= List of shipwrecks in March 1942 =

The list of shipwrecks in March 1942 includes all ships sunk, foundered, grounded, or otherwise lost during March 1942.

== 1 March ==
List of shipwrecks: 1 March 1942
Ship	State	Description
HNLMS A	Royal Netherlands Navy	World War II: Battle of Java: The A-class minesweeper was scuttled at Soerabaja, Netherlands East Indies to avoid capture by Japanese forces. She was raised, repaired and put into Imperial Japanese Navy service as CHa-113.
HNLMS Arend	Royal Netherlands Navy	World War II: Battle of Java: The seaplane tender was scuttled at Tandjong Priok, Netherlands East Indies to avoid capture by Japanese forces. She was raised by the Japanese and towed to Soerabaja in April 1943. Repaired 29 January–29 February 1944. Commissioned into the [Imperial Japanese Navy as PB-108 on 31 July 1944.
Audacity	United Kingdom	World War II: The tanker was sunk by a mine off Grimsby, Lincolnshire. Eight of her crew and two DEMS gunners were killed. There were four survivors.
Augustina	Netherlands	World War II: The tanker was scuttled to prevent capture by Harukaze (Imperial Japanese Navy). Harukaze machine gunned the survivors in their lifeboats killing 39. Three survivors were rescued by a Japanese destroyer on the night of 3–4 March and taken to Makassar, Netherlands East Indies.
HNLMS Bellatrix	Royal Netherlands Navy	World War II: Battle of Java: The patrol vessel was scuttled at Tandjong Priok. Later raised by the Japanese. The vessel was returned post-war.
Carperby	United Kingdom	World War II: The cargo ship was torpedoed and sunk in the Atlantic Ocean 520 nautical miles (960 km) east of Halifax, Nova Scotia, Canada (39°57′N 55°40′W) by U-588 (Kriegsmarine) with the loss of all 47 crew.
Chapaev	Soviet Navy	World War II: The transport ship struck a Soviet mine and sank in the Black Sea near Sevastopol. Conflicting sources say there were between 88 and 120 dead.
USS Edsall	United States Navy	USS Edsall World War II: The Clemson-class destroyer was bombed and damaged by Imperial Japanese Navy aircraft, then shelled and sunk in the Indian Ocean in 18,000 feet (5,500 m) of water some 200 miles (320 km) east of Christmas Island by Hiei and Kirishima (both Imperial Japanese Navy) with the loss of 146 of her 153 crew and 31 USAAF pilots. Five or six crewmen were rescued by the Japanese, five were later executed in a prisoner of war camp. The wreck located in mid 2023.
Egitto	Regia Marina	World War II: The auxiliary cruiser struck a mine and sank off Taranto with the loss of 77 of her 103.
HMS Encounter	Royal Navy	World War II: Second Battle of the Java Sea: The E-class destroyer was shelled and sunk off Bawean, Netherlands East Indies (5°00′S 111°00′E) by Ashigara and Myōkō (both Imperial Japanese Navy) with the loss of seven of her 158 crew. Encounter's survivors spent the night in the water and were rescued on 2 March by Ikazuchi (Imperial Japanese Navy).
HNLMS Evertsen	Royal Netherlands Navy	World War II: Battle of Sunda Strait: The Admiralen-class destroyer was shelled and damaged by Murakumo and Shirakumo (both Imperial Japanese Navy) and was beached on Sebuku Island in the Sunda Strait. Nine of her crew were killed.
HMS Exeter	Royal Navy	HMS Exeter World War II: Second Battle of the Java Sea: The York-class cruiser was torpedoed and sunk by Inazuma (Imperial Japanese Navy). Some of Exeter's survivors were then rescued by Inazuma during the afternoon following the battle, while the remainder were rescued on 2 March by Ikazuchi (Imperial Japanese Navy).
HNLMS Fazant	Royal Netherlands Navy	World War II: Battle of Java: The seaplane tender was scuttled as a blockship by naval gunfire at Tandjong Priok. She was raised by the Japanese and towed to Soerabaja on 31 July 1944. Repaired and commissioned into the Imperial Japanese Navy as PB-109 on 15 October 1944.
Finnanger	Norway	World War II: The tanker as torpedoed, shelled and sunk in the Atlantic Ocean (38°40′N 58°38′W) by U-158 (Kriegsmarine) with the loss of all 39 crew.
HMS HDML 1063	Royal Navy	World War II: The Harbour Defence Motor Launch was lost at Tanjung Priok.
Horai Maru	Imperial Japanese Army	World War II: Battle of Sunda Strait: The hospital ship was torpedoed and sunk by Mogami (Imperial Japanese Navy). The torpedoes had missed USS Houston (United States Navy) and HMAS Perth (Royal Australian Navy). She was refloated on 12 December 1946 and beached at Siglap, Singapore. Horai Maru was refloated in 1948, towed to a Japanese port and scrapped.
USS Houston	United States Navy	World War II: Battle of Sunda Strait: The Northampton-class cruiser was torpedoed and sunk with the loss of 693 of her 1,061 crew.
Kaizyo Maru	Japan	World War II: The cargo ship was torpedoed and sunk in the Pacific Ocean (4°52′N 151°20′E) by USS Grampus (United States Navy).
RT-19 Komintern	Soviet Union	World War II: The fishing trawler was torpedoed and sunk in the Barents Sea north of Cape Teriberski by U-436 (Kriegsmarine) with the loss of all 34 crew.
Kota Radja	Netherlands	World War II: Battle of Java: The cargo ship was scuttled on the coast of Madura opposite Soerabaja, Netherlands East Indies to avoid capture by the Japanese, after being severely damaged by Japanese air attack on 24 February 1942.
Legaspi	Spain	World War II: The United States Army-chartered cargo ship was shelled and damaged by Japanese artillery and scuttled at Luzon, Philippines.
Legazpi	United States	World War II: The cargo ship was scuttled at Cebu, Philippines.
Le Maire	Netherlands	World War II: The cargo ship was torpedoed and sunk in the Indian Ocean 250 nautical miles (460 km) west north west of the Cocos Islands by I-2 (Imperial Japanese Navy).
Lepus	United States	World War II: The cargo ship was shelled and sunk by Kuma and Kiji (both Imperial Japanese Navy) at Cebu.
HNLMS Merel	Royal Netherlands Navy	World War II: The patrol vessel was scuttled by naval gunfire as a blockship at Tandjong Priok.
Modjokerto	Netherlands	World War II: The cargo ship was sunk in the Indian Ocean south of Christmas Island (12°40′S 106°40′E) by Chikuma (Imperial Japanese Navy). Forty-two of her crew were killed, and 25 of the survivors were later executed at a prisoner of war camp.
Osei Maru	Imperial Japanese Navy	World War II: The salvage ship struck a mine and was beached at Jizo Saki. She was refloated and scrapped, probably post war.
PLM 20	Vichy France	World War II: The cargo ship was torpedoed and sunk in the Mediterranean Sea off Misrata, Libya by HMS Unbeaten (Royal Navy) with the loss of nine of her 41 crew.
Parigi	Netherlands	World War II: The cargo ship was sunk by I-2 (Imperial Japanese Navy). Eight survivors, including her captain, were rescued by HMAS Yarra (Royal Australian Navy), but seven of those died when HMAS Yarra was sunk on 4 March and the captain died in the lifeboat afterwards.
USS Pecos	United States Navy	World War II: The tanker was bombed and sunk in the Indian Ocean off Christmas Island by Aichi D3A aircraft from Sōryū (Imperial Japanese Navy). There were 232 survivors.
HMAS Perth	Royal Australian Navy	World War II: Battle of Sunda Strait: The Leander-class cruiser was torpedoed and sunk with the loss of 353 of her 681 crew.
Polgarth	United Kingdom	World War II: The cargo ship was sunk in the North Sea by a mine two miles (3.2 km) off the Aldeburgh Light Float. Her sixteen crew were rescued.
HNLMS Poolster	Royal Netherlands Navy	World War II: Battle of Java: The patrol vessel/seaplane tender was scuttled by naval gunfire as a blockship at Tandjong Priok. She was raised on 1 September 1943, repaired and put into Japanese service on 22 November 1943 as Horei Maru.
USS Pope	United States Navy	World War II: Second Battle of the Java Sea: The Clemson-class destroyer was bombed and sunk in the Java Sea (4°00′S 111°30′E) by Japanese aircraft. Pope's survivors were rescued late in the evening on 3 March by Inazuma (Imperial Japanese Navy) after having spent almost two and a half days adrift in the water.
HMS Rahman	Royal Navy	World War II: Battle of Java: The auxiliary minesweeper was shelled, exploded and sunk by Japanese destroyers off Babi Island in the Sunda Strait.
Regulus	United States	World War II: The cargo ship was shelled and sunk by Kuma and Kiji (both Imperial Japanese Navy) Cebu.
HNLMS Rigel	Royal Netherlands Navy	World War II: The patrol vessel was scuttled by naval gunfire as a blockship at Tandjong Priok. (See entry 02/03/1942)
HNLMS Roggeveen	Royal Netherlands Navy	World War II: The auxiliary depot ship was scuttled at Sourabaya to prevent capture. She was raised and scrapped in 1951.
Rooseboom	Netherlands	World War II: The cargo ship was torpedoed and sunk in the Indian Ocean west of Sumatra, Netherlands East Indies by I-59 (Imperial Japanese Navy) (00°15′N 86°50′E). About 250 passengers and crew killed. Two survivors were rescued by Palopo (Netherlands) on 11 March.
Sakura Maru	Imperial Japanese Army	World War II: Battle of Sunda Strait: The Sakito Maru-class anti-aircraft transport was torpedoed and sunk in the South China Sea (5°56′S 106°12′E) by Mogami (Imperial Japanese Navy). The torpedoes had missed USS Houston (United States Navy) and HMAS Perth (Royal Australian Navy).
HMS Scott Harley	Royal Navy	World War II: The auxiliary minesweeper was sunk in the Indian Ocean by Arashi and Nowaki (both Imperial Japanese Navy) south of Tjilatjap, Netherlands East Indies. Lost with all hands.
Shinshū Maru	Imperial Japanese Army	World War II: Battle of Sunda Strait: The Shinshū Maru-class landing craft depot ship was torpedoed and sunk by Mogami (Imperial Japanese Navy). The torpedoes had missed USS Houston (United States Navy) and HMAS Perth (Royal Australian Navy). She was raised on 23 September 1942 and underwent temporary repairs at Tanjong Priok until 23 December. The vessel then sailed to Singapore to undergo permanent repairs and returned to service on 6 May 1943.
Siaoe	Netherlands	World War II: Battle of Java: The cargo ship was sunk by Japanese warships in the Java Sea near Bojonegoro, Java.
HMS Sin Aik Lee	Royal Navy	World War II: Battle of Java: The auxiliary minesweeper was shelled and sunk in the Sunda Strait by Japanese destroyers off Babi Island. Her captain was killed.
HMIS Sophie Marie	(United Kingdom) Royal Indian Navy	World War II: The minesweeper/naval trawler struck a mine and sank in the MacPherson Strait off the Andaman Islands with the loss of two of her crew.
HNLMS TAN 1 Paula	Royal Netherlands Navy	World War II: Battle of Java: The auxiliary oiler was scuttled at Tandjong Priok to avoid capture by Japanese forces. She was raised by the Japanese on 24 December 1942 and repaired. Put into Imperial Japanese Army service as Arare Maru on 31 January 1943.
Tatsuno Maru	Japan	World War II: Battle of Sunda Strait: The transport ship ran aground during the battle. She was refloated, converted into a tanker, and returned to service.
HNLMS Tjerimai	Royal Netherlands Navy	World War II: The patrol boat, being converted into a minesweeper, was scuttled at Tandjong Priok. She was salvaged and put into Imperial Japanese Navy service as CHa-118.
Tokushima Maru	Imperial Japanese Army	World War II: Battle of Java: Eastern Java Invasion Force: The Tokushima Maru-class auxiliary transport was bombed by Vickers Vildebeest aircraft and beached at Kragan Village, East Java (100 miles, 160 km west of Soerabaja) to prevent sinking. She was refloated, repaired and returned to service.
Tomohon	Netherlands	World War II: The cargo ship was sunk in the Indian Ocean south of Tjilatjap by Arashi and Nowaki (both Imperial Japanese Navy) 230 miles (370 km). Thirty survivors were rescued by Zaandam (Netherlands).
Toradja	Netherlands	World War II: Battle of Java: The cargo liner was shelled and sunk in the Indian Ocean south of Tjilatjap by Arashi and Nowaki (both Imperial Japanese Navy) 250 miles (400 km) with the loss of eleven of her crew.
U-656	Kriegsmarine	World War II: The Type VIIC submarine was depth charged and sunk in the Atlantic Ocean south of Cape Race, Dominion of Newfoundland (46°15′N 53°15′W) by a Lockheed Hudson aircraft of the United States Navy with the loss of all 45 crew.
W-2	Imperial Japanese Navy	World War II: Battle of Sunda Strait: The W-1-class minesweeper was torpedoed and sunk by Mogami (Imperial Japanese Navy). The torpedoes had missed USS Houston (United States Navy) and HMAS Perth (Royal Australian Navy). Raised, repaired and put in reserve status.
War Sidar	United Kingdom	The cargo ship ran aground in the Sunda Strait. She was subsequently salvaged by the Japanese and entered service as Honan Maru.

== 2 March ==
List of shipwrecks: 2 March 1942
Ship	State	Description
HNLMS Albatros	Royal Netherlands Navy	World War II: Battle of Java: The patrol vessel was scuttled at Soerabaja, Netherlands East Indies. She was raised on 20 January 1943, repaired by November 1943 and put in Japanese service as Arabato Maru.
HNLMS Aldebaran	Royal Netherlands Navy	World War II: Battle of Java: The patrol vessel was scuttled at Soerabaja.
HNLMS Alor	Royal Netherlands Navy	World War II: Battle of Java: The minesweeper was scuttled at Soerabaja to avoid capture by Japanese forces.
Anastasia	Netherlands	World War II: Battle of Java: The tanker was scuttled off Tandjong Priok, Java, Netherlands East Indies to prevent capture by the Japanese. She was raised on 30 October 1942, repaired and put into Imperial Japanese Army service as Bukun Maru in November 1942.
Angelina	Netherlands	World War II: Battle of Java: The tanker was scuttled at Soerabaja to avoid capture by Japanese forces. She was raised, repaired and put into Imperial Japanese Navy service as Anjo Maru.
Apostolos	Greece	World War II: The schooner was shelled and damaged by HMS Turbulent (Royal Navy) in the Aegean Sea and was beached. She was a total loss. A German soldier and one Greek crew member were killed.
HNLMS Ardjoeno	Royal Netherlands Navy	World War II: Battle of Java: The Ardjoeno-class minesweeper was scuttled at Soerabaja to avoid capture by Japanese forces. She was raised, repaired and put into Imperial Japanese Navy service as the submarine chaser CHa-102.
HNLMS Aroe	Royal Netherlands Navy	World War II: Battle of Java: The minesweeper was scuttled at Soerabaja to avoid capture by Japanese forces.
HNLMS B	Royal Netherlands Navy	World War II: Battle of Java: The A-class minesweeper was scuttled at Soerabaja to avoid capture by Japanese forces. She was raised, repaired and put into Imperial Japanese Navy service as the submarine chaser CHa-112.
B-1	Netherlands	World War II: Battle of Java: The launched but incomplete B-1-class anti-submarine vessel was scuttled at Soerabaja to avoid capture by Japanese forces. She was later raised, repaired and put into Imperial Japanese Navy service on 31 August 1943 as the submarine chaser CHa-103.
B-2, B-3, B-4, B-5, B-6, B-7, B-8, B-9, B-10, B-11, and B-12	Netherlands	World War II: Battle of Java: The incomplete B-1-class anti-submarine vessels were reported burned or blown up at Soerabaja or Tandjong Priok to avoid capture by Japanese forces, or were captured intact at a later date. Seven were put into Imperial Japanese Navy service as the submarine chasers CHa-105, CHa-106, CHa-107, CHa-108, CHa-114, CHa-115.
HNLMS Banckert	Royal Netherlands Navy	World War II: Battle of Java: The Admiralen-class destroyer was scuttled by being torpedoed by HNLMS K XVIII (Royal Netherlands Navy) at Soerabaja. She was raised by the Japanese, partially repaired, and put into service as PB-106.
HNLMS Bangkalen	Royal Netherlands Navy	World War II: Battle of Java: The Bangkalen-class minelayer was scuttled at Soerabaja to avoid capture by Japanese forces.
HNLMS BEN 1 Minjak	Royal Netherlands Navy	World War II: Battle of Java: The transport ship was scuttled by shelling with a 75 mm (3 in) gun by HNLMS Pieter de Bitter (Royal Netherlands Navy) at Soerabaja, Netherlands East Indies to avoid capture by Japanese forces.
HNLMS Bantam	Royal Netherlands Navy	World War II: Battle of Java: The minesweeper was scuttled at Soerabaja, Netherlands East Indies to avoid capture by Japanese forces. She was later salvaged by the Japanese and taken into Imperial Japanese Navy service as Cha-117.
Benkalis	Netherlands	World War II: Battle of Java: The cargo ship was scuttled off Soerabaja to avoid capture by the Japanese.
Belawan	Netherlands	World War II: Battle of Java: The cargo ship (1,330 GRT, 1929) was scuttled off Soerabaja, Netherlands East Indies to avoid capture by the Japanese.
Bengalen	Netherlands	World War II: Battle of Java: The cargo ship was scuttled in the Westvaarwater, near Soerabaja to avoid capture by the Japanese.
HNLMS Biaro	Royal Netherlands Navy	World War II: Battle of Java: The auxiliary patrol vessel was scuttled.
HNLMS Boenakan	Royal Netherlands Navy	World War II: Battle of Java: The unarmed watch ship, a coaster, was scuttled at Tandjong Priok to avoid capture by Japanese forces.
HNLMS Boeroe	Royal Netherlands Navy	World War II: Battle of Java: The auxiliary minesweeper was scuttled at Tandjong Priok to avoid capture by Japanese forces.
HNLMS Bogor	Royal Netherlands Navy	World War II: Battle of Java: The minesweeper was scuttled at Soerabaja to avoid capture by Japanese forces.
HNLMS Castor	Royal Netherlands Navy	World War II: Battle of Java: The repair shipwas scuttled at Soerabaja. She was raised, repaired and put into Japanese service in 1943 as Osei Maru.
HNLMS Ceram	Royal Netherlands Navy	World War II: Battle of Java: The minesweeper was scuttled at Tandjong Priok, Netherlands East Indies to avoid capture by Japanese forces.
Chariklia	Greece	World War II: The schooner was shelled and sunk in the Aegean Sea by HMS Turbulent (Royal Navy).
HNLMS Cheribon	Royal Netherlands Navy	World War II: Battle of Java: The minesweeper was scuttled at Tandjong Priok to avoid capture by Japanese forces.
HNLMS D	Royal Netherlands Navy	World War II: Battle of Java: The A-class minesweeper was scuttled at Soerabaja to avoid capture by Japanese forces.
Dann	Netherlands	World War II: Battle of Java: The tug was scuttled off Tandjong Priok to avoid capture by the Japanese. She was later raised, repaired and put into Japanese service.
De Klerk	Netherlands	World War II: Battle of Java: The cargo ship was scuttled at Tandjong Priok to prevent capture by Japanese forces. She was raised, repaired and put into Japanese service as Imaji Maru.
HNLMS Digoel	Royal Netherlands Navy	World War II: Battle of Java: The Djember-class minesweeper was scuttled at Tandjong Priok to avoid capture by Japanese forces.
HNLMS Djampea	Royal Netherlands Navy	World War II: Battle of Java: The Djember-class minesweeper was scuttled at Tandjong Priok to avoid capture by Japanese forces. She was salvaged by the Japanese.
HNLMS Djember	Royal Netherlands Navy	World War II: Battle of Java: The Djember-class minesweeper was scuttled at Tandjong Priok to avoid capture by Japanese forces. She was raised, repaired and put into Imperial Japanese Navy service on 20 February 1943 as Wa-104.
HNLMS Djombang	Royal Netherlands Navy	World War II: Battle of Java: The Djember-class minesweeper was scuttled at Tandjong Priok to avoid capture by Japanese forces. She was raised, repaired and put into Imperial Japanese Navy service on 31 August 1943 as Wa-106.
USAT Don Esteban	United States Army	World War II: Philippines Campaign: The transport ship was sunk by Japanese forces off Mindoro, Philippines.
HNLMS Endeh	Royal Netherlands Navy	World War II: Battle of Java: The Djember-class minesweeper was shelled and sunk off the west coast of Java by Matsuke and Shiokaze (both Imperial Japanese Navy). Seven of her crew were killed. Seventeen survivors reached the Duizend Eilanden on 13 March. Four of them were killed by the local inhabitants. On 23 March, the thirteen survivors reached Krawang, northeast of Batavia and were captured by the Japanese the next day.
HNLMS Enggano	Royal Netherlands Navy	World War II: Battle of Java: The Djember-class minesweeper was scuttled at Tandjong Priok to avoid capture by Japanese forces. She was raised, repaired and put into Imperial Japanese Navy service on 31 August 1944 as Wa-107.
HNLMS Eridanus	Royal Netherlands Navy	World War II: Battle of Java: The patrol vessel was scuttled at Soerabaja. She was raised, repaired and put in Japanese service as Enoshima Maru.
Evangelistria	Greece	World War II: The schooner was shelled and sunk in the Aegean Sea by HMS Turbulent (Royal Navy). Thirteen German troops were killed.
Fabritsius	Soviet Navy	World War II: The transport ship was torpedoed and sunk, or was beached in shallow water, off Kamysh Burun (44°51′N 35°08′E) by aircraft of VIII Fliegerkorps, Luftwaffe. She settled with most of the wreck above water. Five crew and several passengers were killed. The vessel was torpedoed by A-3 (Soviet Navy) on 12 May 1943. She was later refloated and broken up.
Fakfak	Netherlands	World War II: Battle of Java: The incomplete Djember-class minesweeper was scuttled on the ways at Tandjong Priok to avoid capture by Japanese forces. She was repaired, launched on 17 October 1942, and put into Imperial Japanese Navy service 30 June 1943 as Wa-102.
Flores	Netherlands	World War II: Battle of Java: The incomplete Djember-class minesweeper was scuttled on the ways at Tandjong Priok to avoid capture by Japanese forces. She was repaired, launched on 17 October 1942, completed on 25 June 1943 and put into Imperial Japanese Navy service as Wa-101.
HNLMS Fomalhaut	Royal Netherlands Navy	World War II: Battle of Java: The patrol vessel was scuttled at Soerabaja.
Garoet	Netherlands	World War II: Battle of Java: The incomplete Djember-class minesweeper was scuttled at Tandjong Priok to avoid capture by Japanese forces. She was raised, repaired, relaunched on 20 November 1942 and put into Imperial Japanese Navy service 7 May 1943 as Wa-103.
HNLMS Gedеh	Royal Netherlands Navy	World War II: Battle of Java: The Ardjoeno-class minesweeper was scuttled at Soerabaja to avoid capture by Japanese forces. She was raised, repaired and put into Imperial Japanese Navy service as the submarine chase CHa-104.
HNLMS Gemma	Royal Netherlands Navy	World War II: Battle of Java: The patrol vessel was scuttled at Soerabaja. She was raised 27 October 1942, repaired and put into Japanese service as Kita Maru.
Giang Seng	United Kingdom	World War II: Battle of Java: The cargo liner was scuttled at Soerabaja to avoid capture by Japanese forces.
Grissee	Netherlands	World War II: Battle of Java: The incomplete Djember-class minesweeper was scuttled at Tandjong Priok to avoid capture by Japanese forces. She was refloated, repaired, relaunched on 15 February 1943 and put into Imperial Japanese Navy service on 31 August 1943 as Wa-105.
Gunny	Norway	World War II: The cargo ship was torpedoed and sunk in the Atlantic Ocean (27°09′N 66°22′W) by U-126 (Kriegsmarine) with the loss of fourteen of her 26 crew. Survivors were rescued by Temmaren (Sweden).
Ha-13	Imperial Japanese Navy	The midget submarine sank during training at Aki Nada. The instructor and two trainees were killed.
J. H. Menten	Netherlands	World War II: The lightship was scuttled as a blockship at Makassar, Netherlands East Indies.
Johan	Netherlands	World War II: Battle of Java: The tug was scuttled off Tandjong Priok to avoid capture by the Japanese. She was salvaged by the Japanese.
HNLMS K X	Royal Netherlands Navy	World War II: Battle of Java: The K VIII-class submarine was scuttled at Soerabaja to avoid capture by Japanese forces.
HNLMS K XIII	Royal Netherlands Navy	World War II: Battle of Java: The K XI-class submarine was scuttled at Soerabaja to avoid capture by Japanese forces.
HNLMS K XVIII	Royal Netherlands Navy	World War II: Battle of Java: The K XIV-class submarine was scuttled at Soerabaja to avoid capture by Japanese forces. Her commanding officer and two crewmen were killed by a scuttling charge that detonated while they were inspecting the boat on 3 March.
Kamogawa Maru	Imperial Japanese Navy	World War II: The auxiliary aircraft ferry was torpedoed and sunk north of the mouth of the Lombok Strait (8°06′S 115°57′E) by USS Sailfish (United States Navy). Her commanding officer, five crewmen, 273 troops and 48 other passengers were killed.
Kasuaris	Netherlands	World War II: Battle of Java: The tanker was scuttled off Soerabaja to avoid capture by Japanese forces. Her crew were rescued by Inazuma (Imperial Japanese Navy).
Kawi	Royal Netherlands Navy	World War II: Battle of Java: The Ardjoeno-class minesweeper was scuttled at Soerabaja to avoid capture by Japanese forces. She was raised, repaired and put into Imperial Japanese Navy service as CHa-109 (Imperial Japanese Navy).
HNLMS Koning der Nederlanden	Royal Netherlands Navy	World War II: Battle of Java: The accommodation ship was scuttled at Soerabaja to avoid capture by Japanese forces.
Kraus	Netherlands	World War II: Battle of Java: The tug was scuttled at Tjilatjap, Netherlands East Indies to avoid capture by Japanese forces. She was salvaged by the Japanese.
Kyo Maru No. 11 GO	Imperial Japanese Navy	World War II: Battle of Luzon: The auxiliary submarine chaser/naval whaler was sunk in Subic Bay by Curtiss P-40 Warhawk aircraft of the United States Army Air Force.
Lawoe	Royal Netherlands Navy	World War II: Battle of Java: The Ardjoeno-class minesweeper was scuttled at Soerabaja to avoid capture by Japanese forces. She was raised, repaired and put into Imperial Japanese Navy service as the submarine chaser CHa-110.
Liran	Netherlands	World War II: Battle of Java: The cargo ship was scuttled off Soerabaja to avoid capture by the Japanese.
Loa-Koeloe	Netherlands	World War II: Battle of Java: The cargo ship was scuttled off Soerabaja to avoid capture by the Japanese.
Meroendoeng	Netherlands	World War II: Battle of Java: The cargo ship was scuttled as a blockship off Tandjong Priok to avoid capture by the Japanese.
Merapi	Netherlands	World War II: Battle of Java: The incomplete Smeroe-class minesweeper was blown up on her slipway at Batavia, Netherlands East Indies to avoid capture by Japanese forces.
Mijer	Netherlands	World War II: Battle of Java: The passenger ship was scuttled off Tandjong Priok to avoid capture by the Japanese. She was later salvaged by the Japanese.
Milo	Netherlands	World War II: The tanker was scuttled off Tandjong Priok to avoid capture by Japanese forces.
HNLMS No. 16	Royal Netherlands Navy	World War II: Battle of Java: The auxiliary minesweeper was scuttled.
HNLMS No. 17	Royal Netherlands Navy	World War II: Battle of Java: The auxiliary minesweeper was scuttled.
HNLMS OJR-1, HNLMS OJR-4, HNLMS OJR-5, and HNLMS OJR-6	Royal Netherlands Navy	World War II: Battle of Java: The OJR-1-class anti-submarine vessels were scuttled at Soerabaja, Netherlands East Indies to avoid capture by Japanese forces. OJR-1 or OJR-4 was raised, repaired and put into Imperial Japanese Navy service as the submarine chaser CHa-111.
Paul	Netherlands	World War II: Battle of Java: The tug was scuttled off Tandjong Priok to avoid capture by the Japanese. She was later salvaged by the Japanese.
Pehe	Netherlands	World War II: Battle of Java: The coaster was scuttled off Soerabaja to avoid capture by the Japanese.
USS Pillsbury	United States Navy	World War II: Battle of Java: The Clemson-class destroyer was shelled and sunk in the Indian Ocean 200 nautical miles (370 km) west of Christmas Island by Atago and Takao (both Imperial Japanese Navy) with the loss of all 116 crew.
HNLMS Pollux	Royal Netherlands Navy	World War II: Battle of Java: The outer Westwater Channel lightship/auxiliary tender/patrol vessel was scuttled at the Genoa Pier, Soerabaja to avoid capture by Japanese forces. She was raised, repaired and put into Imperial Japanese Navy service February 1943 as Hourai.
Prominent	Norway	World War II: Battle of Java: The cargo ship was shelled and sunk in the Indian Ocean south of Tjilatjap by Imperial Japanese Navy warships with the loss of 24 lives. Survivors were rescued by Tomohon and Zaandam (both Netherlands). There were three survivors.
Proteus	Norway	World War II: Battle of Java: The cargo ship was scuttled at Batavia.
Ram	Netherlands	World War II: Battle of Java: The incomplete Regulus-class minelayer was scuttled at Tjilatjap to avoid capture by Japanese forces. She was salvaged by the Japanese and conversion to a gunboat was started, but never completed. Ram was scrapped post-war.
HNLMS Rigel	Royal Netherlands Navy	World War II: Battle of Java: The Rigel-class minelayer was scuttled as a blockship in the north entrance to the harbour at Soerabaja to avoid capture by Japanese forces.
Salak	Royal Netherlands Navy	World War II: Battle of Java: The Ardjoeno-class minesweeper was scuttled at Soerabaja to avoid capture by Japanese forces. She was raised, repaired and put into Imperial Japanese Navy service as the submarine chaser CHa-118.
Shinyu	Canada	World War II: Battle of Java: The cargo ship was scuttled at Soerabaja.
Siberoet	Netherlands	World War II: Battle of Java: The cargo ship was scuttled at Tandjong Priok. She was salvaged by the Japanese.
Sibolga	Netherlands	World War II: Battle of Java: The cargo ship was shelled and sunk off Tandjong Priok by Japanese ships.
Silindoeng	Netherlands	World War II: Battle of Java: The cargo ship was scuttled off Soerabaja to avoid capture by the Japanese.
Sinabang	Netherlands	World War II: Battle of Java: The cargo ship was sunk by aircraft based on Ryūjō (Imperial Japanese Navy) 150 nautical miles (280 km) north east of Batavia.
Sisunthon Nawa	United Kingdom	World War II: Battle of Java: The cargo ship was scuttled off Soerabaja to avoid capture by the Japanese.
Slamat	Netherlands	World War II: Battle of Java: The Smeroe-class minesweeper was blown up incomplete on her slipway at Batavia to avoid capture by Japanese forces.
Soemenep	Netherlands	World War II: Battle of Java: The Soemenep-class minelayer was scuttled at Soerabaja to avoid capture by Japanese forces.
Speelman	Netherlands	World War II: Battle of Java: The passenger ship was scuttled at Soerabaja to prevent capture by Japanese forces. She was raised, repaired and put into Japanese service as Hakko Maru.
USS Stewart	United States Navy	World War II: Battle of Java: The Clemson-class destroyer was scuttled at the Soerabaja Naval Base. She was later salvaged by the Imperial Japanese Navy and entered service as Patrol Boat No. 102
HMS Stronghold	Royal Navy	World War II: Battle of Java: The S-class destroyer was shelled and sunk south of Java (12°20′S 112°00′E) by Arashi, Maya and Nowaki (all Imperial Japanese Navy) with the loss of her captain and 74 crew. About 50 survivors were taken as prisoners of war.
Taiyuan	United Kingdom	World War II: Battle of Java: The cargo liner, contracted by the United States Army as a blockade runner, was scuttled at Soerabaja to avoid capture by the Japanese, or was attacked and sunk by Japanese ships (7°11′38″S 112°45′21″E) with the loss of three of her crew.
Talang Akar	Netherlands	World War II: Battle of Java: The tanker was scuttled at Soerabaja to prevent capture by Japanese forces. She was salvaged and put into Japanese service as Tango Maru.
HNLMS TAN 2	Royal Netherlands Navy	World War II: Battle of Java: The auxiliary tanker was scuttled at Soerabaja to prevent capture by Japanese forces. She was salvaged and put into Japanese service as Yuno Maru.
HNLMS TAN 4	Royal Netherlands Navy	World War II: Battle of Java: The auxiliary tanker was scuttled at Soerabaja to prevent capture by Japanese forces. She was salvaged and put into Japanese service as Eiho Maru.
HNLMS TAN 5	Royal Netherlands Navy	World War II: Battle of Java: The auxiliary tanker was scuttled at Soerabaja to prevent capture by Japanese forces. She was salvaged in July 1942 and put into Japanese service on 5 August 1942 as Aiten Maru.
HNLMS TAN 6	Royal Netherlands Navy	World War II: Battle of Java: The auxiliary tanker was scuttled at Soerabaja to prevent capture by Japanese forces. She was salvaged and put into Japanese service as Yusei Maru.
HNLMS TAN 8	Royal Netherlands Navy	World War II: Battle of Java: The auxiliary tanker was scuttled at Soerabaja to prevent capture by Japanese forces. She was salvaged and put into Japanese service as Teikai Maru.
Tamako	Netherlands	World War II: Battle of Java: The coaster was scuttled off Soerabaja to avoid capture by the Japanese.
HMS Tapah	Royal Navy	World War II: Battle of Singapore: The auxiliary minesweeper was sunk by Japanese aircraft at Singapore.
Taroena	Netherlands	World War II: Battle of Java: The ocean-going tug was scuttled off Soerabaja to avoid capture by the Japanese.
Tembusu	Netherlands	World War II: Battle of Java: The tanker was scuttled off Soerabaja to prevent capture by Japanese forces.
Tjerimai	Netherlands	World War II: Battle of Java: The Smeroe-class minesweeper was scuttled incomplete at Batavia= to avoid capture by Japanese forces. She was raised, completed and put into Imperial Japanese Navy service in August 1942 as the submarine chaser CHa-101.
Tjikandi	Netherlands	World War II: Battle of Java: The cargo ship was scuttled as a blockship at Soerabaja (7°11′17″S 112°43′18″E).
Tjikarang	Netherlands	World War II: Battle of Java: The cargo ship was scuttled as a blockship at Soerabaja (7°11′02″S 112°43′07″E). The wreck was removed post-war.
HNLMS TM-4	Royal Netherlands Navy	World War II: Battle of Java: The TM-4-class motor torpedo boat was scuttled at Soerabaja to avoid capture by Japanese forces. She was later raised, repaired and put into Imperial Japanese Navy service as Gyoraitei No. 102.
HNLMS TM-6	Royal Netherlands Navy	World War II: Battle of Java: The TM-4-class motor torpedo boat was scuttled at Soerabaja to avoid capture by Japanese forces. She was later raised, repaired and put into Imperial Japanese Navy service on 6 May 1943 as Gyoraitei No. 103.
HNLMS TM-8	Royal Netherlands Navy	World War II: Battle of Java: The TM-4-class motor torpedo boat was scuttled at Soerabaja to avoid capture by Japanese forces. She was later raised, repaired and put into Imperial Japanese Navy service as Gyoraitei No. 104.
HNLMS TM-9,	Royal Netherlands Navy	World War II: Battle of Java: The TM-4-class motor torpedo boatwas scuttled at Soerabaja to avoid capture by Japanese forces. She was later raised, repaired and put into Imperial Japanese Navyservice as Gyoraitei No. 105.
HNLMS TM-10	Royal Netherlands Navy	World War II: Battle of Java: The TM-4-class motor torpedo boatwas scuttled at Soerabaja to avoid capture by Japanese forces. She was later raised, repaired and put into Imperial Japanese Navyservice as Gyoraitei No. 106.
HNLMS TM-11	Royal Netherlands Navy	World War II: Battle of Java: The TM-4-class motor torpedo boatwas scuttled at Soerabaja to avoid capture by Japanese forces. She was later raised, repaired and put into Imperial Japanese Navyservice as Gyoraitei No. 107.
HNLMS TM-12	Royal Netherlands Navy	World War II: Battle of Java: The TM-4-class motor torpedo boat was scuttled at Soerabaja to avoid capture by Japanese forces. She was later raised, repaired and put into Imperial Japanese Navyservice as Gyoraitei No. 108.
HNLMS TM-13	Royal Netherlands Navy	World War II: Battle of Java: The TM-4-class motor torpedo boat was scuttled at Soerabaja to avoid capture by Japanese forces. She was later raised, repaired and put into Imperial Japanese Navy service on 9 October 1943 as Gyoraitei No. 109.
HNLMS TM-14	Royal Netherlands Navy	World War II: Battle of Java: The TM-4-class motor torpedo boat was scuttled at Soerabaja to avoid capture by Japanese forces. She was later raised, repaired and put into Imperial Japanese Navy service as Gyoraitei No. 110.
HNLMS TM-15	Royal Netherlands Navy	World War II: Battle of Java: The TM-4-class motor torpedo boat was scuttled at Soerabaja to avoid capture by Japanese forces. She was later raised, repaired and put into Imperial Japanese Navy service on 6 May 1943 as Gyoraitei No. 111.
TM-16	Netherlands	World War II: Battle of Java: The incomplete TM-4-class motor torpedo boat was scuttled at Soerabaja to avoid capture by Japanese forces. She was later raised, repaired and put into Imperial Japanese Navy service on 6 May 1943 as Gyoraitei No. 115.
TM-17	Netherlands	World War II: Battle of Java: The incomplete TM-4-class motor torpedo boat was scuttled at Soerabaja to avoid capture by Japanese forces. She was later raised, repaired and put into Imperial Japanese Navy service on 6 May 1943 as Gyoraitei No. 116.
TM-18	Netherlands	World War II: Battle of Java: The incomplete TM-4-class motor torpedo boat was scuttled at Soerabaja to avoid capture by Japanese forces. She was later raised, repaired and put into Imperial Japanese Navy service on 6 May 1943 as Gyoraitei No. 117.
TM-19	Netherlands	World War II: Battle of Java: The incomplete TM-4-class motor torpedo boat was blown up on the stocks at Soerabaja to avoid capture by Japanese forces. She was later raised, repaired and put into Imperial Japanese Navy service on 6 May 1943 as Gyoraitei No. 118.
TM-20	Netherlands	World War II: Battle of Java: The incomplete TM-4-class motor torpedo boat was blown up on the stocks at Soerabaja to avoid capture by Japanese forces. She was later raised, repaired and put into Imperial Japanese Navy service on 15 November 1943 as Gyoraitei No. 119.
TM-21	Netherlands	World War II: Battle of Java: The incomplete TM-4-class motor torpedo boat was blown up on the stocks at Soerabaja to avoid capture by Japanese forces. She was later raised, repaired and put into Imperial Japanese Navy service on 15 November 1943 as Gyoraitei No. 120.
Toendjoek	Netherlands	World War II: Battle of Java: The cargo ship was scuttled at Tandjong Priok as a blockship. She was salvaged and put into Japanese service as Tango Maru.
Tomori	Netherlands	World War II: Battle of Java: The cargo ship was scuttled as a blockship in the north entrance to the Harbor at Soerabaja to prevent capture. She was salvaged and put in Japanese service as Sumatra Maru.
Tunni	Norway	World War II: Battle of Java: The cargo ship was scuttled at Soerabaja.
Van Diemen	Netherlands	World War II: Battle of Java: The cargo ship was scuttled at Soerabaja.
West	Netherlands	World War II: Battle of Java: The Inner Westwater Channel lightship was scuttled by shelling by Eland Dubois (Royal Netherlands Navy) at Soerabaja to avoid capture by Japanese forces.
HNLMS Witte de With	Royal Netherlands Navy	World War II: Battle of Java: The Admiralen-class destroyer was bombed and sunk at Soerabaja by Japanese aircraft.
Unnamed floating drydock	Royal Netherlands Navy	World War II: Battle of Java: The unnamed floating drydock was scuttled by being torpedoed by HNLMS K XVIII (Royal Netherlands Navy) at Soerabaja

== 3 March ==
List of shipwrecks: 3 March 1942
Ship	State	Description
Agios Dionyssios	Greece	World War II: The caïque was shelled and sunk in the Aegean Sea south of the Kassandra peninsula by HMS Turbulent (Royal Navy). Sixteen German soldiers were killed.
USS Asheville	United States Navy	World War II: Battle of Java: The Asheville-class gunboat was shelled and sunk south of Java, Netherlands East Indies by Arashi and Nowaki (both Imperial Japanese Navy). Of her 159 crew, one officer was taken as a prisoner of war, other survivors were machine gunned in the water.
Bantam	Netherlands	World War II: Battle of Java: The Alor-class minesweeper was scuttled incomplete at Tandjong Priok, Netherlands East Indies to avoid capture by Japanese forces. She was raised, completed and put into Imperial Japanese Navy service in August 1943 as the submarine chaser CHa-117.
Bintoehan	Netherlands	World War II: The cargo ship was captured by Arashi and Nowaki (both Imperial Japanese Navy) on 1 March. She was ordered to Bali, Netherlands East Indies by her captors as a prize, but they did not place a prize crew on board and she was scuttled by her crew. 70 miles (110 km) south-east from Nusa Baroeng, Netherlands East Indies.
Bordvik	Norway	World War II: Battle of Java: The cargo ship was scuttled by her crew at Soerabaja, Java. She was salvaged by the Japanese and returned to service as Manryu Maru.
Cuma	Italy	World War II: The ammunition ship was bombed, and sunk at Palermo, Sicily by Vickers Wellington aircraft of the Royal Air Force. The wreck was scrapped 1946–48.
Eastwater Channel Lightship	Netherlands	World War II: Battle of Java: The lightship was scuttled by HNLMS Willebroard Snellius (Royal Netherlands Navy) at Soerabaja to avoid capture by Japanese forces.
Helenus	United Kingdom	World War II: The cargo ship was torpedoed and sunk in the Atlantic Ocean (6°01′N 12°02′W) by U-68 (Kriegsmarine) with the loss of six of her 82 crew. Survivors were rescued by Beaconsfield (United Kingdom).
Jean et Jacques	Kriegsmarine	World War II: The transport ship was torpedoed and sunk in the English Channel north of Cape Gris Nez, Pas-de-Calais, France by Royal Navy motor torpedo boats. There were seven dead and 38 survivors.
Koolama	Australia	World War II: The ship was bombed and sunk at Wyndham, Western Australia. She was raised in 1948, taken out to sea and scuttled.
Mary	United States	World War II: The cargo ship was torpedoed and sunk in the Atlantic Ocean 165 nautical miles (306 km) off the coast of Brazil (8°25′N 52°50′W) by U-129 (Kriegsmarine) with the loss of one of her 34 crew. Survivors were rescued by Alcoa Scout (United States).
USS Perch	United States Navy	World War II: The Porpoise-class submarine was depth charged and damaged northwest of Soerabaja by Amatsukaze and Hatsukaze (both Imperial Japanese Navy) on 1 March and attacked by Sazanami and Ushio (both Imperial Japanese Navy) on 2 March, the crippled submarine was scuttled by her crew in the Java Sea when Sazanami and Ushio attacked her again. Ushio rescued her 59 crew, but five of them died in Japanese prison camps before the end of the war.
Siantar	Netherlands	World War II: The cargo ship was shelled, torpedoed and sunk in the Indian Ocean 250 miles (400 km) north west of Shark Bay, Australia (21°20′S 108°45′E) by I-1 (Imperial Japanese Navy) with the loss of 21 of her 58 crew. Survivors were rescued by Van Spilbergen (Netherlands).
Van Neck	Netherlands	World War II: Battle of Java: The passenger ship was scuttled off Soerabaja to avoid capture by the Japanese. She was refloated by the Japanese in June 1944. Subsequent fate unknown.
Van Waerwijck	Netherlands	World War II: Battle of Java: The cargo ship was scuttled at Tandjong Priok. She was raised, repaired, and put into Japanese service as Harugiku Maru.
Twelve unnamed ships	Flags unknown	World War II: Twelve ships were shelled and sunk in the Sulu Sea off Cebu City, Cebu, Philippines by Kuma (Imperial Japanese Navy).

== 4 March ==
List of shipwrecks: 4 March 1942
Ship	State	Description
HMS Anking	Royal Navy	World War II: Battle of Java: HMAS Yarra Convoy: The depot ship was shelled and sunk in the Indian Ocean 300 nautical miles (560 km) south of Java, Netherlands East Indies (11°30′S 109°03′E) by Arashi, Atago, Maya, Nowaki, Takao (all Imperial Japanese Navy) with the loss of 260 men. Some of the survivors were rescued by Tawali (Netherlands), others reached Java and were taken as prisoners of war. Sources vary on the overall number of survivors, some reporting just 16 while others state 57 were rescued by Tawali alone. HMAS Anking was on a voyage from Tjilatjap, Netherlands East Indies to Fremantle, Western Australia.
Enggano	Netherlands	World War II: The cargo ship was bombed and set on fire by a floatplane from Takao (Imperial Japanese Navy) on 1 March and burned out 270 miles (430 km) south of Java, Netherlands East Indies. The crew were rescued after midnight on 2 March by Tawali (Netherlands). The burning and abandoned ship was scuttled by shelling by Chikuma and Urakaze (both Imperial Japanese Navy).
Erimo	Imperial Japanese Navy	World War II: The fleet oiler was torpedoed in Sunda Strait off Bali, Netherlands East Indies (04°19′S 108°25′E) by USS S-39 (United States Navy). Erimo was beached on Bali and declared a constructive total loss. Four of her crew were killed. Survivors were rescued by Yura (Imperial Japanese Navy). The wreck was scrapped post-war.
Francol	United Kingdom	World War II: Battle of Java: HMAS Yarra Convoy: The tanker was shelled and sunk in the Indian Ocean 300 nautical miles (560 km) south of Java (11°30′S 109°03′E) by Arashi, Atago, Maya, Nowaki, Takao (all Imperial Japanese Navy). The Japanese rescued 12 Chinese crewmen and one English officer from one lifeboat, but another lifeboat was never seen again.
Frumenton	United Kingdom	World War II: The cargo ship struck a mine and sank off Orfordness, Suffolk (52°21′N 1°58′E). Her 38 crew survived. The wreck was subsequently dispersed.
Gypsum Prince	United Kingdom	The cargo ship was sunk following a collision with the tanker Voco (Hong Kong) 4 nautical miles (7.4 km) off Lewes, Delaware, United States. Her master and five crewmen were killed. Twenty survivors were rescued by the United States Coast Guard.
Kaijo Maru No.2	Japan	World War II: The tanker was torpedoed and sunk in the Pacific Ocean about 145 nautical miles (269 km) south of Truk, Caroline Islands by USS Grampus (United States Navy).
HMS LCP(L) 106	Royal Navy	The Landing Craft Personnel (Large) was wrecked at Tobruk, Libya.
HMS MMS 51	Royal Navy	World War II: Battle of Java: HMAS Yarra Convoy: The MMS-class minesweeper was shelled and sunk in the Indian Ocean 300 nautical miles (560 km) south of Java by one of Arashi, Atago, Maya, Nowaki, Takao (all Imperial Japanese Navy) after the ship was abandoned with seacocks open. Fourteen survivors were rescued by Tjimanoek (Netherlands) on 7 March and made it to Fremantle, Australia, others reached Java and were taken as prisoners of war.
Manipi	Netherlands	World War II: Battle of Java: The cargo ship was bombed and sunk at Tjilatjap by Japanese Mitsubishi G4M "Betty" aircraft. She was raised, repaired and put into Japanese service as Mainici Maru.
Merkus	Netherlands	World War II: The cargo ship was shelled and sunk in the Indian Ocean north east of Cocos Island (08°40′S 94°30′E) by I-7 (Imperial Japanese Navy). Survivors eventually made it to Sumatra, Netherland East Indies.
Morioka Maru	Imperial Japanese Army	World War II: The Army-requisitioned Morioka Maru-class cargo ship struck a Japanese mine and sank west of Nakadori Island (32°55′N 129°26′E). There were no casualties. Her crew and a stowaway were rescued by Kinjo Maru (Imperial Japanese Navy).
HNLMS Tydeman	Royal Netherlands Navy	World War II: The survey ship was bombed and sunk at Tjilatjap by Japanese Mitsubishi G4M "Betty" aircraft. She was raised, repaired and put into Japanese service as Choyo.
Van der Hagen	Netherlands	The cargo ship was destroyed by fire and sank at Tjilatjap. She was subsequently salvaged and entered Japanese service as Harusei Maru
HMAS Yarra	Royal Australian Navy	World War II: Battle of Java: HMAS Yarra Convoy: The Grimsby-class sloop was shelled and sunk in Indian Ocean 300 nautical miles (560 km) south of Java by Arashi, Atago, Maya, Nowaki, Takao (all Imperial Japanese Navy). She was also bombed while sinking by an observation aircraft. Her captain was killed, 34 of her 151 crew, plus the captain of Parigi (Netherlands) abandoned ship. Only thirteen survivors were still alive when rescued by HNLMS K XI (Royal Netherlands Navy) on 9 March, Parigi's captain died in the lifeboat.

== 5 March ==
List of shipwrecks: 5 March 1942
Ship	State	Description
Alacrity	United Kingdom	World War II: The coaster was bombed and damaged 7 nautical miles (13 km) north west of the Bishop Rock, Cornwall. She was on a voyage from Drogheda, County Louth, Ireland to Newport, Monmouthshire. She was repaired and returned to service.
Argus	Germany	The cargo ship (3,143 GRT) was destroyed when her cargo of munitions exploded at Hambukt, Norway.
Atjeh	Netherlands	World War II: Battle of Java: The oil lighter was bombed, burned and capsized at Tjilatjap, Netherlands East Indies. The wreck was later salvaged by the Japanese.
Auby	Sarawak	World War II: Battle of Java: The cargo ship was scuttled at Batavia.
HNLMS Barentz	Royal Netherlands Navy	World War II: Battle of Java: The Barentsz-class repair ship was bombed, burned out, and sunk at Tjilatjap. The wreck removed post-war.
Benmohr	United Kingdom	World War II: The cargo ship was torpedoed and sunk in the Atlantic Ocean 210 nautical miles (390 km) south south west of Freetown, Sierra Leone (6°05′N 14°15′W) by U-505 (Kriegsmarine). Her 56 crew were rescued by a Short Sunderland aircraft of 95 Squadron, Royal Air Force.
Bussard	Germany	The cargo ship was wrecked off Kristiansand, Norway.
HNLMS Canopus	Royal Netherlands Navy	World War II: Battle of Java: The patrol vessel was scuttled at Tjilatjap. She was raised, repaired and put into Japanese service as Ariake Maru.
Collamer	United States	World War II: Convoy HX 178: The Design 1022 ship straggled behind the convoy. She was torpedoed and sunk in the Atlantic Ocean (44°19′N 63°09′W) by U-404 (Kriegsmarine) with the loss of seven of her 38 crew. Survivors were rescued by Empire Woodcock (United Kingdom).
HNLMS Hoofdinspector Zeeman	Royal Netherlands Navy	World War II: Battle of Java: The tender/patrol vessel was bombed and sunk, or shelled and sunk by Hiei and Kirishima (both Imperial Japanese Navy) at Tjilatjap.
Ipoh	United Kingdom	World War II: Battle of Java: The cargo liner was scuttled at Batavia.
Kaijo Maru No. 2 GO	Imperial Japanese Navy	World War II: The oiler was torpedoed and sunk 130 miles (210 km) south of Truk, Caroline Islands (04°52′N 151°20′E) by USS Grampus (United States Navy). Her commanding officer and 89 passengers and crew were killed.
Maddalena G.	Italy	World War II: The cargo ship was torpedoed and severely damaged at Corfu, Greece by HMS Torbay (Royal Navy). The wreck was partly stripped by the Germans in March 1944.
Mariana	United States	World War II: The cargo ship was torpedoed and sunk in the Atlantic Ocean off the Turks Islands (22°14′N 71°23′W) by U-126 (Kriegsmarine) with the loss of all 36 crew.
Marin Sanudo	Italy	World War II: The cargo ship was torpedoed and sunk in the Mediterranean Sea 10.5 nautical miles (19.4 km) southwest of Lampedusa (35°18′N 12°35′E) by HMS Uproar (Royal Navy) with the loss of 57 of the 220 men aboard.
O. A. Knudsen	Norway	World War II: The tanker was torpedoed, shelled and sunk in the Atlantic Ocean (26°17′N 75°50′W) by U-128 (Kriegsmarine) with the loss of two of her 40 crew.
AS 91 Ottavia	Regia Marina	World War II: The auxiliary submarine chaser was shelled and sunk off Capo Ortholiti (38°16′N 20°20′E) by HMS Thorn (Royal Navy). Seventeen crew members were killed and all five survivors were wounded.
Rokan	Netherlands	World War II: Battle of Java: The cargo ship was sunk by Japanese aircraft off Tjilatjap. She was salvaged by the Japanese.
Rüstringen	Germany	The pilot boat as wrecked in the Wadden Sea. Four of her crew survived.
Takao Maru	Imperial Japanese Army	World War II: The Takao Maru-class transport ship beached at Santa, Philippines (17°29′N 120°26′E) due to bomb damage suffered in an attack by United States Army Air Forces aircraft on 10 December 1941, was destroyed by Philippine guerrillas. Her wreck later was stripped for usable parts.
Tohiti	Netherlands	World War II: Battle of Java: The cargo liner was bombed, burned and sunk in the Donan River at Tjilatjap. She was raised by the Japanese, but was not repaired. Tohiti was scrapped in late 1945.
V 2001 Pastor Pype	Kriegsmarine	The Vorpostenboot was wrecked in the Wadden Sea whilst going to the assistance of Rüstringen (Germany). Her 28 crew survived.
Unnamed drydock	Netherlands	World War II: Battle of Java: The drydock was bombed and sunk at Tjilatjap.

== 6 March ==
List of shipwrecks: 6 March 1942
Ship	State	Description
HNLMS BEN 3 Asahan	Royal Netherlands Navy	World War II: Battle of Java: The auxiliary gasoline tanker was scuttled at Tjilatjap, Netherlands East Indies to prevent capture by Japanese forces. She was salvaged by the Japanese.
HNLMS BEN 4 Mampawa	Royal Netherlands Navy	World War II: Battle of Java: The auxiliary gasoline tankerwas scuttled at Tjilatjap to prevent capture by Japanese Forces. She was salvaged and put into Japanese service as Harufuji Maru.
HNLMS C	Royal Netherlands Navy	World War II: Battle of Java: The A-class minesweeper was scuttled at Soerabaja, Netherlands East Indies to avoid capture by Japanese forces. She was raised, repaired and put into Imperial Japanese Navy service as the submarine chaser CHa-116.
Dajak	Netherlands	World War II: Battle of Java: The cargo ship was sunk by Japanese aircraft off Tjilatjap, or burned, broke in two, and sank at Tjilatjap.
Fortuna	United States Army	World War II: The United States Army-requisitioned cargo ship was strafed by Japanese aircraft setting her deck cargo of drums of gasoline on fire. She burned and sank 1/4 nautical mile (460 m) off Culion Island, Calamian Islands, Philippines.
Hans Egede	(Denmark) Greenland	World War II: The coaster was torpedoed and sunk in the Atlantic Ocean (46°00′N 55°30′W) by U-587 (Kriegsmarine) with the loss of all 23 crew.
Kampar	Netherlands	World War II: Battle of Java: The cargo ship was burned and scuttled in the Donan River at Tjilatjap to avoid capture by Japanese forces.
Lahneck	Germany	The cargo ship collided with Treuenfels (Germany) and sank off Oksøy, Norway (58°04′04″N 8°04′04″E). She was refloated in 1946 and scrapped.
Makian	Netherlands	World War II: Battle of Java: The cargo ship was bombed, burned and sank at Tjilatjap.
Mandar	Netherlands	World War II: Battle of Java: The cargo ship was scuttled at Tjilatjap to prevent capture by Japanese forces. She was salvaged and put into Japanese service as Hiyoshi Maru.
Maros	Netherlands	World War II: Battle of Java: The ocean-going tug was scuttled at Tjilatjap.
Melpomène	United Kingdom	World War II: The tanker was torpedoed and sunk in the Atlantic Ocean (23°35′N 62°39′W by Giuseppe Finzi (Regia Marina). All 49 people on board survived.
HNLMS Moera Boelian	Royal Netherlands Navy	World War II: The miscellaneous depot ship/motor torpedo boat tender was scuttled at the Madoera Pier, Soerabaja to prevent capture by Japanese forces.
Overijssel	Netherlands	World War II: Battle of Java: The tug was scuttled in the Netherlands East Indies to prevent capture by the Japanese.
HNLMS P-4	Royal Netherlands Navy	World War II: Battle of Java: The patrol boat was scuttled off Java, Netherlands East Indies.
Pasir	Netherlands	World War II: Battle of Java: The cargo ship was scuttled at Tjilatjap to prevent capture by Japanese forces. She was raised and scrapped in 1946.
HNLMS Peta	Royal Netherlands Navy	World War II: The auxiliary depot ship/motor torpedo boat tender was scuttled at the Madoera Pier, Soerabaja to prevent capture by Japanese forces.
HNLMS Pieter de Bitter	Royal Netherlands Navy	World War II: Dutch East Indies campaign: The Jan van Amstel-class minesweeper was scuttled at Soerabaja to avoid capture by Japanese forces.
Poseidon	Netherlands	World War II: Battle of Java: The tanker was hit, burned, at scuttled off Tjilatjap to prevent capture by the Japanese. She was raised, repaired and put into Japanese service as Hosei Maru in 1942.
Rengat	Netherlands	World War II: Battle of Java: The cargo ship was burned and scuttled at Tjilatjap. She was salvaged by the Japanese.
Reteh	Netherlands	World War II: Battle of Java: The cargo ship was scuttled at Tjilatjap to avoid capture by the Japanese.
Rononia	United Kingdom	World War II: The fishing trawler was torpedoed and sunk in the Atlantic Ocean south of Iceland by U-701 (Kriegsmarine) with the loss of all eleven crew.
HNLMS Serdang	Royal Netherlands Navy	World War II: Battle of Java: The Serdang-class auxiliary motor torpedo boat tender/torpedo repair ship (680/820 t, 1897) was scuttled near Soerabaya. A crew member was killed.
Sipirok	Netherlands	World War II: Battle of Java: The cargo ship was scuttled at Tjilatjap to prevent capture by Japanese forces.
Sipora	Netherlands	World War II: Battle of Java: The cargo ship (1,594 GRT, ) was scuttled at Tjilatjap to prevent capture by Japanese forces.
Smyshlyony	Soviet Navy	World War II: The Project 7U Storozhevoy-class destroyer struck a mine in the Black Sea off Kerch. She sank in a storm the next day off Yuzhnaya Ozereyka near Novorossiysk.
Sydhav	Norway	World War II: The tanker was torpedoed and sunk in the Atlantic Ocean (4°47′N 14°57′W) by U-505 (Kriegsmarine) with the loss of twelve of her 36 crew. Survivors were rescued by HMT Kelt (Royal Navy).
Taki Maru	Japan	World War II: The cargo ship was torpedoed and sunk in the East China Sea by USS Narwhal (United States Navy.
Tenyo Maru	Japan	World War II: The transport ship was bombed and damaged at Nouméa by United States Navy aircraft based on USS Yorktown (United States Navy). She was consequently beached.
Thorstrand	Norway	World War II: Convoy UGS 6: The cargo ship was torpedoed and sunk in the Atlantic Ocean (41°23′N 42°59′W) by U-172 (Kriegsmarine) with the loss of four of her 47 crew.
HNLMS TM-5, HNLMS TM-7, and HNLMS TM-9	Royal Netherlands Navy	World War II: Battle of Java: The TM-4-class motor torpedo boats were scuttled at Soerabaja to avoid capture by Japanese forces. They were later raised, repaired and entered Imperial Japanese Navy service in 1942–43.
Tønsbergfjord	Norway	World War II: The cargo ship was torpedoed and sunk in the Atlantic Ocean 200 nautical miles (370 km) west of Bermuda (31°22′N 68°05′W) by Enrico Tazzoli (Regia Marina). Her 33 crew were rescued by Arthur W. Sewall (Norway), Telamon (Netherlands) and Velma (Norway).
HNLMS Willebrord Snellius	Royal Netherlands Navy	World War II: The survey vessel/patrol ship was scuttled at Soerabaja to avoid capture by Japanese forces.
X 127	Royal Navy	World War II: The tanker lighter, a former X-class landing craft, was sunk by German or Italian aircraft off Manoel Island, Malta.
Unnamed landing craft	Imperial Japanese Navy	World War II: Japanese invasion of Burma: The landing craft was shelled and sunk at the mouth of the Rangoon River by HMIS Hindustan ( (United Kingdom) Royal Indian Navy).)
Unnamed boat	Imperial Japanese Navy	World War II: Japanese invasion of Burma: A boat was shelled and sunk at the mouth of the Rangoon River by HMIS Hindustan ( (United Kingdom) Royal Indian Navy) with the loss of all hands.

== 7 March ==
List of shipwrecks: 7 March 1942
Ship	State	Description
Alfoer	Netherlands	World War II: Battle of Java: The damaged oil lighter was burned and scuttled at Tjilatjap, Netherlands East Indies to avoid capture by Japanese forces. She was salvaged by the Japanese.
Arabutan	Brazil	World War II: The cargo ship was torpedoed and sunk in the Atlantic Ocean 81 nautical miles (150 km) off Cape Hatteras, North Carolina, United States (35°15′N 73°55′W) by U-155 (Kriegsmarine) with the loss of one of the 55 people aboard. Survivors were rescued by USCGC Calypso ( United States Coast Guard).
Asahisan Maru	Japan	World War II: The cargo ship was torpedoed and sunk in the Pacific Ocean south of Shioyasaki by USS Grenadier (United States Navy).
Barbara	United States	World War II: The cargo ship was torpedoed and sunk in the Atlantic Ocean (20°10′N 73°05′W) by U-126 (Kriegsmarine) with the loss of 26 of her 85 crew.
Cardonia	United States	World War II: The cargo ship was torpedoed and sunk in the Atlantic Ocean (19°53′N 73°27′W) by U-126 (Kriegsmarine) with the loss of one of her 38 crew. Survivors were rescued by USS Mulberry (United States Navy) or reached land in their lifeboats.
HNLMS Eland Dubois	Royal Netherlands Navy	World War II: Battle of Java: The Jan van Amstel-class minesweeper was scuttled in the Madura Strait off Java Netherlands East Indies, after suffering a boiler failure during her escape from advancing Japanese forces.
HNLMS Gouden Leeuw	Royal Netherlands Navy	World War II: Battle of Java: The Prins van Oranje-class minelayer was scuttled at Soerabaja, Netherlands East Indies, to avoid capture by Japanese forces.
Independence Hall	United States	World War II: Convoy SC 73: The cargo ship ran aground off Sable Island, Nova Scotia, Canada (43°55′N 59°55′W). She broke in two and sank the next day. Ten of her crew were killed. Survivors were rescued by HMCS Niagara (Royal Canadian Navy).
Izhora	Soviet Union	World War II: Convoy QP 8: The cargo ship was shelled and damaged in the northern part of the Norwegian Sea by German surface ships including Tirpitz (Kriegsmarine). She was finished off by Z14 Friedrich Ihn (Kriegsmarine) with depth charges dropped alongside after falling out of the convoy with engine problems. Thirty-three of her crew were killed, the only survivor was captured and later died as a prisoner of war.
Kidoel	Netherlands	World War II: Battle of Java: The 775 GRT coaster was bombed and sunk at Tjilatjap by Japanese aircraft. Raised by the Japanese and put into service in 1943 as Haruno Maru.
Nyggjaberg	Faroe Islands	World War II: The fishing trawler (349 GRT) was torpedoed and sunk in the Atlantic Ocean south of Iceland by the U-701 (Kriegsmarine) with the loss of all 21 crew.
Nyounghla	United Kingdom	World War II: The cargo ship was scuttled at Rangoon, Burma to prevent capture by the Japanese.
Poelau Bras	Netherlands	World War II: Battle of Java: The cargo liner was sunk north west of Christmas Island by dive bombers from Hiryu (Imperial Japanese Navy). Thirty-three people were killed in the sinking, including her captain and first mate, plus many drowned afterwards for an estimated 240 killed. One hundred and thirteen survivors made it to Sumatra, Netherlands East Indies in 3 lifeboats and were taken as prisoners of war.
Skåne	Sweden	World War II: The cargo ship was sunk in the Atlantic Ocean off the Bahamas by Giuseppe Finzi (Regia Marina). Her 34 crew were rescued.
Steel Age	United States	World War II: The cargo ship was torpedoed and sunk in the Atlantic Ocean 130 nautical miles (240 km) north of Paramaribo, Surinam (6°45′N 53°15′W) by U-129 (Kriegsmarine) with the loss of 33 of her 34 crew. The survivor was taken aboard U-129 as a prisoner of war.
Uniwaleco	Union of South Africa	World War II: The whale factory ship was torpedoed and sunk in the Caribbean Sea 45 nautical miles (83 km) west of the Saint Vincent Passage (13°23′N 62°04′W) by U-161 (Kriegsmarine) with the loss of eighteen of her 51 crew.
HNLMS Valk	Royal Netherlands Navy	World War II: Battle of Java: The seaplane tender was run aground near the mouth of the harbour at Tjilatjap in a failed attempt to scuttle her as a blockship and to avoid capture by Japanese forces. She was raised by the Japanese and towed to Surabaya on 21 April 1943. Valk was repaired and commissioned into the Imperial Japanese Navy as PB-104 on 31 January 1944.
Woolgar	Norway	World War II: The cargo ship was bombed and sunk in the Indian Ocean 150 nautical miles (280 km) south west of Tjilatjap by Japanese aircraft. Two British gunners died when they stayed onboard too long defending the ship and the ship sank. Some Chinese crew members were killed when the aircraft strafed the lifeboats. One lifeboat arrived at Port Blair, Andaman Islands 88 days later and those aboard were made prisoners of war. Total crew casualties were 38 dead, 1 prisoner of war and five other survivors.

== 8 March ==
List of shipwrecks: 8 March 1942
Ship	State	Description
Baluchistan	United Kingdom	World War II: The cargo ship was torpedoed, shelled and sunk in the Atlantic Ocean (4°13′N 8°32′W) by U-68 (Kriegsmarine) with the loss of three of the 71 people aboard.
Ebro	Denmark	The cargo ship ran aground in Strathbeg Bay. She was declared a total loss.
Esso Bolivar	Panama	World War II: The tanker was torpedoed, shelled and damaged in the Atlantic Ocean 30 nautical miles (56 km) south east of Guantánamo Bay, Cuba (19°38′N 74°38′W) by U-126 (Kriegsmarine) with the loss of eight of her 50 crew. The survivors abandoned her and were rescued by USS Endurance (United States Navy). Esso Bolivar was towed to Guantanamo Bay. She was subsequently repaired, and returned to service in August 1942.
Hengist	United Kingdom	World War II: The coaster was torpedoed and sunk in the Atlantic Ocean north west of Cape Wrath, Sutherland (59°31′N 10°15′W) by U-569 (Kriegsmarine) with the loss of three of her 32 crew. Survivors were rescued by the fishing trawler Groenland (France).
HNLMS Jan van Amstel	Royal Netherlands Navy	World War II: Battle of Java: The Jan van Amstel-class minesweeper was sunk in the Madura Strait off Java, Netherlands East Indies by Arashio (Imperial Japanese Navy). Twenty-three of her crew were killed; survivors were made prisoners of war.
HNLMS Krakatau	Royal Netherlands Navy	World War II: Battle of Java: The Krakatau-class minelayer was scuttled off Madura, Netherlands East Indies to avoid capture by Japanese forces.
Mgla	Soviet Navy	The auxiliary guard ship ran aground at Cape Tsyp-Navolok and sank.
Montevideo	Uruguay	World War II: The cargo ship was torpedoed and sunk in the Atlantic Ocean (29°13′N 69°35′W) by Enrico Tazzoli (Regia Marina) with the loss of fourteen of her 49 crew.
HMT Northern Princess	Royal Navy	World War II: The 188.1-foot (57.3 m), 655-ton anti-submarine naval trawler/ocean boarding vessel was torpedoed and sunk in the Atlantic Ocean off the coast of the Dominion of Newfoundland (45°22′N 55°59′W) by U-587 (Kriegsmarine) with the loss of all 38 crew.
Petar	Yugoslavia	The cargo ship collided with a United States Navy tanker and sank in the Atlantic Ocean (10°34′N 59°10′W) with the loss of eighteen of her 25 crew.
Sneg	Soviet Union	The icebreaker was lost in the Black Sea between Taman and Kerch.

== 9 March ==
List of shipwrecks: 9 March 1942
Ship	State	Description
Unknown partizan motorboat	Yugoslavia	The large Yugoslav partizan motorboat was sunk by Vigilante (Regia Marina) in Lake Shkodër after an intense exchange of fire.
Charles Racine	Norway	World War II: The tanker was torpedoed and sunk in the Atlantic Ocean (23°33′N 60°10′W) by Giuseppe Finzi (Regia Marina). All 48 crew were rescued, seven by an Argentine merchant ship and 41 by USS Moffett (United States Navy).
Cayrú	Brazil	World War II: The cargo ship was torpedoed and sunk in the Atlantic Ocean 130 nautical miles (240 km) south of New York, United States (39°10′N 72°02′W) by U-94 (Kriegsmarine) with the loss of 53 of her 89 crew. Survivors were rescued by USS AMc-202 (United States Navy) and Titania (Norway).
Hanseat	Panama	World War II: The tanker was torpedoed and sunk in the Atlantic Ocean 10 nautical miles (19 km) northwest of Cape Maysi, Cuba (at 20°25′N 74°07′W), by U-126 (Kriegsmarine). Her 39 crew survived.
Lily	Greece	World War II: Convoy ON 68: The cargo ship straggled behind the convoy. She was torpedoed and sunk in the Atlantic Ocean 470 nautical miles (870 km) east of Halifax, Nova Scotia, Canada (43°32′N 54°14′W), by U-587 (Kriegsmarine) with the loss of three of her 32 crew. Survivors were rescued by HMCS Sackville (Royal Canadian Navy).
HMT Notts County	Royal Navy	World War II: The naval trawler was torpedoed and sunk in the Atlantic Ocean south of Iceland (61°10′N 13°16′W) by U-701 (Kriegsmarine) with the loss of all 41 crew.
HMT Shera	Royal Navy	The naval whaler iced up, capsized and sank in the Barents Sea with the loss of 20 crew while being delivered to the Soviets by the Royal Navy. There were 3 survivors.
Tyr	Norway	World War II: Convoy ON 68: The cargo ship was torpedoed and sunk in the Atlantic Ocean (43°12′N 61°15′W) by U-96 (Kriegsmarine) with the loss of thirteen of her 31 crew. Survivors were rescued by two Canadian warships, one of which was HMCS Georgian (Royal Canadian Navy).

== 10 March ==
List of shipwrecks: 10 March 1942
Ship	State	Description
Aafje	Netherlands	World War II: The fishing vessel was sunk by a mine near IJmuiden, North Holland.
Cabo de São Vicente	Portugal	World War II: The fishing trawler (269 GRT) was sunk in the Atlantic Ocean 26 miles northwest of Cabo da Roca, Portugal by a Condor of KG 40. All 19 crew survived.
Gulftrade	United States	World War II: The tanker was torpedoed and sunk in the Atlantic Ocean 3 nautical miles (5.6 km) off the Barnegat Lighthouse, New Jersey (39°50′N 73°52′W) with the loss of eighteen of her 34 crew. Survivors were rescued by USCGC Antietam ( United States Coast Guard) and USS Larch (United States Navy).
Kongō Maru	Imperial Japanese Navy	Kongō Maru sinking World War II: Invasion of Lae-Salamaua: The Kiyosumi Maru-class armed merchant cruiser was bombed and sunk in Huon Bay off Lae, New Guinea (06°49′S 147°02′E) by United States Navy aircraft.
Kosei Maru	Imperial Japanese Navy	World War II: The Kumagawa Maru-class auxiliary collier/oiler struck a Japanese mine and sank in Cam Ranh Bay, French Indochina (16°05′N 120°20′E). Nine passengers, two gunners, and two of her crew were killed.
RMS Lady Nelson	Canada	World War II: The Lady-class ocean liner was torpedoed and sunk at Port Castries, Saint Lucia by U-161 (Kriegsmarine) with the loss of 25 of the 235 people aboard. She was later salvaged, repaired and returned to service in April 1943 as a Royal Canadian Navy hospital ship.
Lakshmi Govinda	United Kingdom	World War II: The sailing ship was shelled and sunk in the Indian Ocean (13°22′N 87°27′E) by I-62 (Imperial Japanese Navy).
Tenyo Maru	Imperial Japanese Navy	World War II: The auxiliary minelayer was bombed in Huon Bay (06°49′S 147°02′E) by United States Navy aircraft. She broke in two and sank. Nine of her crew were killed.
Umtata	United Kingdom	World War II: The cargo liner was torpedoed and sunk at Port Castries by U-161 (Kriegsmarine) with the loss of four of the 177 people aboard. She was later salvaged, and temporarily repaired, but was torpedoed and sunk on 7 July 1942 whilst under tow to the United States for permanent repairs.
Yokohama Maru	Imperial Japanese Army	World War II: Invasion of Lae-Salamaua: The Yokohama Maru-class auxiliary transport was torpedoed and sunk in Huon Bay off Lae (06°49′S 147°02′E) by United States Navy aircraft. A crew member was killed.

== 11 March ==
List of shipwrecks: 11 March 1942
Ship	State	Description
Baikal Maru	Japan	World War II: The cargo ship was torpedoed and sunk in the Pacific Ocean by USS Pollack (United States Navy).
Caribsea	United States	World War II: The Design 1099 cargo ship was torpedoed and sunk in the Atlantic Ocean 14 nautical miles (26 km) off the Cape Lookout Lighthouse, North Carolina (34°36′N 76°18′W) by U-158 (Kriegsmarine) with the loss of 21 of her 28 crew. Survivors were rescued by Norlindo (United States).
Chilka	United Kingdom	World War II: The cargo ship was shelled and sunk in the Indian Ocean 60 miles (97 km) south of Padang, Sumatra, Netherlands East Indies (00°30′S 95°50′E) by I-2 (Imperial Japanese Navy). Three officers, three laskars and a gunner were killed. Survivors sailed in lifeboats to an island in the Netherlands East Indies. Her captain and six volunteers sailed for Ceylon and were rescued by a Greek ship off Madras, India.
Fukushu Maru	Japan	World War II: The cargo ship was torpedoed and sunk in the East China Sea 270 miles (430 km) east of Shanghai, China (30°53′N 126°20′E) by USS Pollack (United States Navy).
Horseferry	United Kingdom	World War II: The coaster was torpedoed and sunk in the North Sea by S 70 (Kriegsmarine).
Hvoslef	Norway	World War II: The cargo ship was torpedoed and sunk in the Atlantic Ocean off Fenwick Island, Delaware, United States (38°27′N 74°54′W) by U-94 (Kriegsmarine) with the loss of six of her 20 crew.
Mount McKinley	United States	The cargo liner ran aground without loss of life on the beach at Scotch Cap on the coast of Unimak Island in the Aleutian Islands, Territory of Alaska whilst running a zigzag course during a submarine alert. She broke up on the beach during storms in the spring of 1942.
HMS Naiad	Royal Navy	World War II: The Dido-class cruiser was torpedoed and sunk in the Mediterranean Sea (32°01′N 26°20′E) by U-565 (Kriegsmarine) with the loss of 82 of her 664 crew. Survivors were rescued by HMS Jervis, HMS Kipling and HMS Lively (all Royal Navy).
HMT Stella Capella	Royal Navy	World War II: The naval trawler was torpedoed and sunk in the Atlantic Ocean off the coast of Iceland (64°48′N 13°20′W) by U-701 (Kriegsmarine) with the loss of all 33 crew.

== 12 March ==
List of shipwrecks: 12 March 1942
Ship	State	Description
Agia Paraskevi	Greece	World War II: The sloop was shelled and sunk north of the Zea Channel by HMS Turbulent (Royal Navy). Two of her crew were wounded.
Colabee	United States	World War II: The cargo ship (5,518 GRT) was torpedoed and damaged in the Atlantic Ocean 10 nautical miles (19 km) off Cape Guajaba, Cuba (22°10′N 77°30′W) by U-126 (Kriegsmarine). The explosion killed the master and two crew. The survivors abandoned ship in panic and 21 more were lost. There were only 14 survivors. The engines of Colabee had not been stopped and she ran agroundon a small Island off Key Verde, Cuba. She was later refloated, repaired, and returned to service in September 1942.
Cygnet	Panama	World War II: The cargo ship was shelled and sunk in the Atlantic Ocean (24°05′N 74°20′W) by Enrico Tazzoli (Regia Marina). There were 30 survivors.
Ingerto	Norway	World War II: Convoy ON 70: The cargo ship straggled behind the convoy. She was torpedoed and sunk in the Atlantic Ocean (41°30′N 51°00′W) by U-578 (Kriegsmarine) with the loss of all 32 crew.
John D. Gill	United States	World War II: The tanker (11,641 GRT) was torpedoed and sunk in the Atlantic Ocean 25 nautical miles (46 km) east of Cape Fear, North Carolina (33°55′N 77°39′W) by U-158 (Kriegsmarine) with the loss of 23 of her 49 crew. Survivors were rescued by USCGC CG-4405 ( United States Coast Guard) and Robert H. Colley (United States).
Olga	United States	World War II: The cargo ship (2,496 GRT) was torpedoed and sunk in the Atlantic Ocean 20 nautical miles (37 km) north of the Nuevitas Lighthouse, Cuba (21°32′N 76°24′W) by U-126 (Kriegsmarine) with the loss of one of her 33 crew. Survivors were rescued by USS Hambleton (United States Navy) and a floatplane.
Staffa	United Kingdom	The coaster broke loose from her moorings in Bray Harbour, Alderney, Channel Islands and was wrecked.
HMS St. Briac	Royal Navy	World War II: The air target vessel, formerly a ferry, struck a mine and sank in the North Sea off Aberdeen with the loss of five of her nine crew.
Texan	United States	World War II: The cargo ship was torpedoed, shelled and sunk in the Atlantic Ocean 40 nautical miles (74 km) east of Nuevitas, Cuba (21°34′N 76°28′W) by U-126 (Kriegsmarine) with the loss of nine of her 47 crew. Survivors were rescued by the fishing vessel Yoyo (Cuba).

== 13 March ==
List of shipwrecks: 13 March 1942
Ship	State	Description
Albert F. Paul	United States	World War II: The schooner was torpedoed and sunk in the Atlantic Ocean 160 nautical miles (300 km) north east of Cape Hatteras, North Carolina (36°00′N 72°00′W) by U-332 (Kriegsmarine) with the loss of all eight crew.
Anastassis	Greece	World War II: The schooner was shelled and sunk west of Serifos by HMS Turbulent (Royal Navy)].
Chichibu Maru	Imperial Japanese Navy	World War II: The Manko Maru-class auxiliary storeship was torpedoed and damaged in the Pacific Ocean 30 miles (48 km) south west of Mikurajima by USS Gar (United States Navy). Four of her crew and 22 passengers were killed. Fifty-nine passengers and crew were rescued by Hiyoshi Maru No. 2 Go (Imperial Japanese Navy). chichibu Maru sank the next day at 33°50′N 139°32′E.
Daytonian	United Kingdom	World War II: The cargo ship was torpedoed, shelled and sunk in the Atlantic Ocean (26°33′N 74°43′W) by Enrico Tazzoli (Regia Marina) with the loss of one of her 59 crew.
Mabella	Norway	World War II: The cargo ship was torpedoed, shelled and sunk in the Indian Ocean off the Coromandel Coast, India (14°00′N 81°47′E) by I-164 (Imperial Japanese Navy) with the loss of at least nine of her crew. Survivors were rescued by Tanfield (United Kingdom).
Maria Immacolata	Italy	World War II: The fishing lugger was shelled and sunk in the Mediterranean Sea off "Mehedia", Tunisia by HMS Una (Royal Navy).
USS PT-32	United States Navy	World War II: The ELCO 77 foot-class PT boat was scuttled off Taguayan Island, Philippines by USS Permit (United States Navy) after becoming disabled.
Tolten	Chile	World War II: The cargo ship was torpedoed and sunk in the Atlantic Ocean 32 nautical miles (59 km; 37 mi) off Barnegat, New Jersey, United States (40°10′N 73°50′W) by U-404 (Kriegsmarine) with the loss of 26 of her 27 crew. The survivor was rescued by USS Larch (United States Navy).
Trepca	Yugoslavia	World War II: The cargo ship was torpedoed and sunk in the Atlantic Ocean (37°00′N 73°25′W) by U-332 (Kriegsmarine) with the loss of four of her 37 crew. Survivors were rescued by a Swedish merchant ship.
Number Two	United States	World War II: The scow was sunk by Japanese forces near Dutch Harbor, Territory of Alaska.
Number Four	United States	World War II: The scow was sunk by Japanese forces near Dutch Harbor.

== 14 March ==
List of shipwrecks: 14 March 1942
Ship	State	Description
Ammiraglio Millo	Regia Marina	World War II: The submarine was torpedoed and sunk in the Mediterranean Sea off the coast of Calabria (38°27′N 16°37′E) by HMS Ultimatum (Royal Navy) with the loss 55 of her crew, there were fifteen survivors, fourteen of whom were rescued and captured by HMS Ultimatum.
Brabo	Belgium	The cargo ship collided with Poznan (Poland) and was beached off South Shields, Northumberland United Kingdom. She was declared a total loss. The wreck was salvaged and broken up 1949–50.
British Resource	United Kingdom	World War II: The tanker was torpedoed and sunk in the Atlantic Ocean 230 nautical miles (430 km) north of Bermuda (36°04′N 65°38′W) by U-124 (Kriegsmarine) with the loss of 46 of her 51 crew. Survivors were rescued by HMS Clarkia (Royal Navy).
Brynymor	United Kingdom	The cargo ship collided with Empire Hawksbill (United Kingdom) and sank off the Bishop Rock, Isles of Scilly.
Gallinule	United Kingdom	The 120.5-foot (36.7 m), 238-ton trawler was wrecked in a snowstorm on Skerryvore. Three crew were killed. The wreck ended up in Machrihanish Bay (55°25′N 06°45′W).
Kellerwald	Germany	World War II: The cargo ship struck a mine and sank in the North Sea off Helgoland.
Lemuel Burrows	United States	World War II: The collier was torpedoed and sunk in the Atlantic Ocean off Atlantic City, New Jersey (39°21′N 74°13′W) by U-404 (Kriegsmarine) with the loss of 20 of her 34 crew. Survivors were rescued by James Ellwood Jones and Sewall's Point (both United States).
Penelope	Panama	World War II: The tanker was torpedoed and sunk in the Caribbean Sea (15°00′N 64°20′W) by U-67 (Kriegsmarine) with the loss of two of her 49 crew.
Sarniadoc	Canada	World War II: The cargo ship was torpedoed and sunk in the Caribbean Sea 200 nautical miles (370 km) west of Guadeloupe by U-161 (Kriegsmarine) with the loss of all 21 crew.
Ste. Marcelle	Vichy France	World War II: The cargo ship was torpedoed and sunk in the Mediterranean Sea by Mocenigo (Regia Marina). She was on a voyage from Marseille, Bouches-du-Rhône to Tunis, Tunisia.
U-133	Kriegsmarine	World War II: The Type VIIC submarine struck a mine and sank in the Saronic Gulf (37°50′N 23°35′E) with the loss of all 45 crew.

== 15 March ==
List of shipwrecks: 15 March 1942
Ship	State	Description
USCGC Acacia	United States Coast Guard	World War II: The buoy tender was shelled and sunk in the Caribbean Sea about 80 nautical miles (150 km) southwest of Saint Kitts and Nevis by U-161 (Kriegsmarine). Her 35 crew were rescued by a Consolidated PBY Catalina aircraft of the United States Navy.
Ario	United States	World War II: The tanker was torpedoed, shelled and damaged in the Atlantic Ocean 11 nautical miles (20 km) south of Cape Lookout, North Carolina (34°37′N 76°20′W) by U-158 (Kriegsmarine) with the loss of eight of her 34 crew. Survivors were rescued by USS Du Pont (United States Navy). Ario sank 10 nautical miles (19 km) east of Cape Lookout (34°14′N 76°27′W).
Athelqueen	United Kingdom	World War II: The tanker was torpedoed, shelled and sunk in the Atlantic Ocean (26°50′N 75°40′W) by Enrico Tazzoli (Regia Marina) with the loss of three of her 49 crew.
Nicole Schiaffino	Germany	World War II: The cargo ship was torpedoed and sunk off the coast of Norway. Also reported as running aground and sinking at Finsnes.
Dago	United Kingdom	World War II: The cargo ship was bombed and sunk in the Atlantic Ocean off Cádiz, Spain by a Focke-Wulf Fw 200 aircraft of the Luftwaffe. All aboard survived, there were only four wounded.
Manaqui	United Kingdom	World War II: The cargo ship was torpedoed and sunk in the Atlantic Ocean (17°15′N 61°00′W) by U-504 (Kriegsmarine) with the loss of all 41 crew.
Olean	United States	World War II: The Design 1128 tanker was torpedoed and damaged in the Atlantic Ocean 15 nautical miles (28 km) south of Cape Lookout (34°22′N 76°29′W) by U-158 (Kriegsmarine) with the loss of six of her 42 crew. Survivors were rescued by lifeboats from Cape Lookout and Fort Macon. Olean was towed to the Hampton Roads and later dry docked. Although she was declared a constructive total loss, she was requisitioned by the War Shipping Administration, repaired and returned to service as Sweep.
Perelle	United Kingdom	The coaster (659 GRT) collided with USS Barnett (United States Navy) and sank 5 nautical miles (9.3 km) south of the Mull of Kintyre, Argyllshire. All 14 crew were rescued uninjured by Barnett.
Presto	United Kingdom	The coaster (971 GRT) collided with Llanover (United Kingdom) and sank 8 miles east of Hartlepool. The whole crew was rescued by Llanover.
S-111	Kriegsmarine	World War II: The Type 1939/40 Schnellboot capsized and sank after a battle with motor gun boats HMMGB 87, HMMGB 88 and HMMGB 91 (all Royal Navy). Seven of her crew were killed.
U-503	Kriegsmarine	World War II: The Type IXC submarine was depth charged and sunk in the Atlantic Ocean south east of the Dominion of Newfoundland (45°50′N 48°50′W) by a Lockheed Hudson aircraft of the United States Navy with the loss of all 51 crew.
HMS Vortigern	Royal Navy	World War II: The V-class destroyer (1,188 GRT) was torpedoed and sunk in the North Sea off Cromer, Norfolk (53°13′N 1°07′E) by the E-boat S-104 (Kriegsmarine) with the loss of 148 of her 158 crew.

== 16 March ==
List of shipwrecks: 16 March 1942
Ship	State	Description
Alcyone	Netherlands	World War II: The cargo ship struck a mine laid by Doggerbank (Kriegsmarine) and sank off the coast of the Union of South Africa (33°59′S 18°03′E). Her 62 crew survived.
Australia	United States	World War II: The tanker was torpedoed and sunk in the Atlantic Ocean (35°07′N 75°22′W) by U-332 (Kriegsmarine) with the loss of four of her 40 crew. Survivors were rescued by William J. Salman (United States).
Baron Newlands	United Kingdom	World War II: The cargo ship was torpedoed and sunk in the Atlantic Ocean (4°35′N 8°32′W) by U-68 (Kriegsmarine) with the loss of seventeen of her 38 crew.
Bremen	Kriegsmarine	World War II: The accommodation ship was burnt out in an arson attack at Bremerhaven and was declared a total loss. She was subsequently stripped to the waterline. The remains were scrapped in 1952–53.
Cressdene	United Kingdom	World War II: The cargo ship struck a mine in the North Sea (52°08′N 1°52′E). She was taken in tow but sank the next day 2.3 nautical miles (4.3 km) off the Sunk Lightship ( Trinity House). Her 40 crew survived. The wreck was subsequently dispersed by explosives.
Oscilla	Netherlands	World War II: The tanker was torpedoed and sunk in the Atlantic Ocean 100 miles (160 km) north of Bermuda (19°00′N 60°00′W) by Morosini (Regia Marina) with the loss of four of her 45 crew. Survivors were rescued by Explorer (United States). Two surviving officers were later killed while being transported by Leto (Netherlands) when she was sunk.
Stangarth	United Kingdom	World War II: The cargo ship, on her maiden voyage, was torpedoed and sunk in the Atlantic Ocean (22°40′N 65°20′W) by U-504 (Kriegsmarine) with the loss of all 46 crew.
Utlandshörn	Germany	World War II: The cargo ship struck a mine and sank off Petsamo, Finland with the loss of seventeen of the 53 people on board.

== 17 March ==
List of shipwrecks: 17 March 1942
Ship	State	Description
Achaia	Kriegsmarine	World War II: The transport ship was bombed by British carrier-based aircraft. In taking evasive action, she struck a mine and sank in the Mediterranean Sea off Tripoli, Libya.
HMS Adept	Royal Navy	The rescue tug ran aground in the Hebrides Islands and was wrecked.
Allende	United Kingdom	World War II: The cargo ship was torpedoed and sunk in the Atlantic Ocean (4°00′N 7°44′W) by U-68 (Kriegsmarine) with the loss of six of her 39 crew. Survivors were taken as prisoners of war.
Ceiba	Honduras	World War II: The cargo ship was torpedoed and sunk in the Atlantic Ocean (35°43′N 73°49′W) by U-124 (Kriegsmarine) with the loss of 44 of the 50 people aboard. Survivors were rescued by USS Hambleton (United States Navy).
Clare Lilley	United Kingdom	The cargo ship was driven ashore near Portuguese Cove, Nova Scotia, Canada. She broke in two and was a total loss.
Crista	United Kingdom	World War II: Convoy AT 34: The tanker was torpedoed and damaged in the Mediterranean Sea (32°21′N 25°00′E) by U-83 (Kriegsmarine) with the loss of seven of her 39 crew. Survivors abandoned ship and were rescued by HMSAS Boksburg (South African Navy). Crista was anchored off Bardia, Libya where the fire was extinguished. She was later repaired, and returned to service in August 1943.
Guglielmotti	Regia Marina	World War II: The Brin-class submarine was torpedoed and sunk in the Mediterranean Sea off the coast of Calabria (37°42′N 15°58′E) by HMS Unbeaten (Royal Navy) with the loss of all 61 crew.
Île de Batz	United Kingdom	World War II: The cargo ship was torpedoed and sunk in the Atlantic Ocean (4°04′N 8°04′W) by U-68 (Kriegsmarine) with the loss of four of her 43 crew. Survivors were rescued by HMCS Weyburn (Royal Canadian Navy).
Ishikari Maru	Imperial Japanese Navy	World War II: The Ishikari Maru-class auxiliary collier was torpedoed and sunk eight nautical miles (15 km; 9.2 mi) west of Port Lloyd, Chichijima, Bonin Islands (27°05′N 142°05′E) by USS Grayback (United States Navy) with the loss of eleven of her crew.
Mount Lycabettus	Greece	World War II: The cargo ship was torpedoed and sunk in the Atlantic Ocean (40°51′N 59°18′W) by U-373 (Kriegsmarine) with the loss of all 30 crew. She was chartered by Switzerland and was sailing with neutrality mark: Switzerland cross painting with "Switzerland" written on the hull.
Ranja	Norway	World War II: The tanker was torpedoed and sunk in the Atlantic Ocean (38°00′N 65°20′W) by U-71 (Kriegsmarine) with the loss of all 30 crew.
San Demetrio	United Kingdom	World War II: The tanker was torpedoed and sunk in the Atlantic Ocean north west of Cape Charles, Virginia, United States (37°03′N 73°50′W) by U-404 (Kriegsmarine) with the loss of nineteen of her 53 crew. Survivors were rescued by Beta (United States).
Scottish Prince	United Kingdom	World War II: The cargo ship was torpedoed and sunk in the Atlantic Ocean (4°10′N 8°00′W) by U-68 (Kriegsmarine) with the loss of one of her 39 crew. Survivors were rescued by HMCS Weyburn (Royal Canadian Navy).

== 18 March ==
List of shipwrecks: 18 March 1942
Ship	State	Description
E.M. Clark	United States	World War II: The tanker was torpedoed and sunk in the Atlantic Ocean 22 nautical miles (41 km) south west of Cape Hatteras, North Carolina (34°50′N 75°35′W) by U-124 (Kriegsmarine) with the loss of one of her 41 crew. Survivors were rescued by USS Dickerson (United States Navy) and Catatumbo (Venezuela).
Kassandra Louloudis	Greece	World War II: The cargo ship was torpedoed and sunk in the Atlantic Ocean off Cape Hatteras (35°05′N 75°25′W) by U-124 (Kriegsmarine). Her 35 crew were rescued by USCGC Dione ( United States Coast Guard).
Tricheco	Regia Marina	World War II: The Squalo-class submarine was torpedoed and sunk in the Mediterranean Sea off Brindisi (40°45′N 17°56′E) by HMS Upholder (Royal Navy) with the loss of 38 of her 40 crew.

== 19 March ==
One more ship may have been lost on this day, see below.

List of shipwrecks: 19 March 1942
Ship	State	Description
Liberator	United States	World War II: The cargo ship was torpedoed and sunk in the Atlantic Ocean (35°05′N 75°30′W) by U-332 (Kriegsmarine) with the loss of five of her 35 crew. Survivors were rescued by USS Umpqua (United States Navy).
M 3408 Teunisje	Kriegsmarine	The naval drifter/minesweeper was lost after running aground at Maassluis, South Holland, Netherlands.
Maria	Regia Marina	World War II: The guard ship was torpedoed, shelled and sunk off Brindisi by HMS Upholder (Royal Navy).
Papoose	United States	World War II: The tanker was torpedoed and sunk in the Atlantic Ocean 15 nautical miles (28 km) south east of Cape Lookout, North Carolina (34°17′N 76°39′W) by U-124 (Kriegsmarine) with the loss of two of her 34 crew. Survivors were rescued by USS Stringham (United States Navy).
W. E. Hutton	United States	World War II: The tanker was torpedoed and sunk in the Atlantic Ocean 20 nautical miles (37 km) south east of Cape Lookout (34°25′N 76°50′W) by U-124 (Kriegsmarine) with the loss thirteen of her 23 crew. Survivors were rescued by Port Halifax (United Kingdom).

== 20 March ==
List of shipwrecks: 20 March 1942
Ship	State	Description
HMS Heythrop	Royal Navy	World War II: The Hunt-class destroyer was torpedoed and sunk in the Mediterranean Sea 40 miles (64 km) north east of Bardia, Libya (32°22′N 25°28′E), by U-652 (Kriegsmarine) with the loss of sixteen of her crew.
Mariso	Netherlands	World War II: The cargo ship was torpedoed and sunk by U-518 (Kriegsmarine). Mariso was on a voyage from New York, United States to Alexandria, Egypt.
HMS ML310	Royal Navy	World War II: The Fairmile B motor launch was shelled and sunk by Imperial Japanese Army artillery. She was raised, repaired and put into Imperial Japanese Navy service as Suikei 12.
Oakmar	United States	World War II: The cargo ship was torpedoed, shelled and sunk in the Atlantic Ocean (36°22′N 68°50′W) by U-71 (Kriegsmarine) with the loss of six of her 36 crew. Survivors were rescued by Stavros ( Greece).
Risøy	Norway	World War II: Convoy PW 128: The cargo ship was bombed and sunk off Trevose Head, Cornwall, United Kingdom, by Luftwaffe aircraft with the loss of one of her eighteen crew. Survivors were rescued by HMT Ruby (Royal Navy).

== 21 March ==
List of shipwrecks: 21 March 1942
Ship	State	Description
Athelviscount	United Kingdom	World War II: The tanker was torpedoed and damaged in the Atlantic Ocean (36°46′N 55°44′W) by U-202 (Kriegsmarine). Athelviscount was towed in to Saint John's, Dominion of Newfoundland. She was subsequently repaired and returned to service as Empire Viscount.
Esso Nashville	United States	World War II: The tanker was torpedoed and damaged in the Atlantic Ocean (33°35′N 77°22′W) by U-124 (Kriegsmarine). Her 37 crew were rescued by USS McKean (United States Navy), USCGC Agassiz and USCGC Tallapoosa (both United States Coast Guard). Esso Nashville later broke in two, with the bow section sinking. The stern section was taken in tow by USS Umpqua (United States Navy). She was later repaired with a new bow and the ship returned to service in March 1943.
Georgy Dimitrov	Soviet Navy	World War II: The transport ship was bombed and sunk at Sebastopol by Luftwaffe aircraft. There were no casualties.
HMS ML 129	Royal Navy	World War II: The Fairmile B motor launch was bombed and sunk in the Mediterranean Sea off the coast of Algeria by Italian aircraft with the loss of seven of her crew. Survivors were rescued by the damaged HMS ML 132 (Royal Navy) that was then interned in French Algeria.
Talyn	Norway	World War II: The tug struck a mine and sank in the North Sea off Helgoland, Germany.
Vamar	Panama	The cargo ship, a sold off Kil-class sloop, ran aground, capsized and sank in heavy seas in 25 feet (7.6 m) of water in the Gulf of Mexico off Mexico Beach, Florida, United States (29°54′N 85°27′W).

== 22 March ==
List of shipwrecks: 22 March 1942
Ship	State	Description
HMS Kingston	Royal Navy	World War II: Second Battle of Sirte: The K-class destroyer was hit and crippled by a 15-inch (381 mm) round fired by Littorio (Regia Marina) and limped into Malta at 16 knots (18 mph). Fifteen of her crew were killed in action. Kingston entered in dry dock after arrival, but she was declared a constructive total loss on 11 April, when she received further damage from German air strikes.
Muskogee	United States	World War II: The tanker was torpedoed and sunk in the Atlantic Ocean 450 nautical miles (830 km) south east of Bermuda (approximately 37°N 62°W) by U-123 (Kriegsmarine) with the loss of all 34 crew.
Nueva Andalucia	Norway	The tanker ran aground at Halifax, Nova Scotia, Canada. She broke in two the next day, with the bow section catching fire. Her 39 crew were rescued. The stern section was refloated on 21 April. It was later towed to New York, United States for repairs. She returned to service with a new bow section in 1947.
Thursobank	United Kingdom	World War II: The cargo ship was torpedoed and sunk in the Atlantic Ocean (38°05′N 68°30′W) by U-373 (Kriegsmarine) with the loss of 30 of her 64 crew. Survivors were rescued by Havsten (Norway).

== 23 March ==
For the loss of the British tanker Diala on this day, see the entry for 15 January 1942.

List of shipwrecks: 23 March 1942
Ship	State	Description
HMS Breconshire	Royal Navy	World War II: The stores ship was bombed and damaged in the Mediterranean Sea off Malta by aircraft of II Fliegerkorps, Luftwaffe. She was beached in Marsaxlokk Bay, Malta but capsized and sank on 27 March. She was refloated in 1950 and scrapped in 1954.
British Prudence	United Kingdom	World War II: Convoy HX 181: The tanker was torpedoed and sunk in the Atlantic Ocean (45°28′N 56°13′W) by U-754 (Kriegsmarine) with the loss of three of her 50 crew. Survivors were rescued by HMS Witherington (Royal Navy).
Clan Campbell	United Kingdom	World War II: Convoy MW 9A: The cargo ship was bombed and sunk in the Mediterranean Sea 8 nautical miles (15 km) off Filfla Island, near Malta by aircraft of II Fliegerkorps, Luftwaffe with the loss of seven lives.
Empire Steel	United Kingdom	World War II: The tanker (8,138 GRT) was torpedoed, shelled and sunk in the Atlantic Ocean 330 nautical miles (610 km) north of Bermuda (37°45′N 63°17′W) by U-123 (Kriegsmarine) with the loss of 39 of her 47 crew. Survivors were rescued by Edmund J. Moran (United States).
Lanciere	Regia Marina	The Soldati-class destroyer foundered in a severe storm east of Malta (35°35′N 17°15′E). Of her 241 or 242 crew members, only fifteen survived; all but one of the survivors were injured.
Naeco	United States	World War II: The tanker was torpedoed and sunk in the Atlantic Ocean (33°59′N 76°40′W) by U-124 (Kriegsmarine) with the loss of 24 of her 38 crew. Survivors were rescued by USCGC Dione ( United States Coast Guard), USS Osprey and USS Umpqua (both United States Navy).
Ostrovsky	Soviet Navy	World War II: The auxiliary minelayer was under repairs at Tuapse when she was bombed and wrecked by Luftwaffe aircraft. Around 100 people (crewmen, workers and firemen) were killed.
Pagasitikos	Greece	World War II: The cargo ship was sunk in the South Atlantic by Thor (Kriegsmarine). Her crew survived.
Peder Bogen	United Kingdom	World War II: The tanker was torpedoed, shelled and sunk in the Atlantic Ocean (24°41′N 57°44′W) by Morosini (Regia Marina). Her 53 crew survived.
Scirocco	Regia Marina	The Maestrale-class destroyer foundered in a severe storm east of Malta (35°50′N 17°35′E). Only two of her 236 crew were rescued.
Vasily Chapaev	Soviet Navy	World War II: The transport ship was torpedoed and sunk in the Black Sea near the Kherson Lighthouse by Luftwaffe aircraft. One hundred and two passengers and crew were killed.

== 24 March ==
List of shipwrecks: 24 March 1942
Ship	State	Description
M 3615	Kriegsmarine	World War II: The auxiliary minesweeper struck a mine and sank in the North Sea off Gravelines, Nord France, with the loss of fifteen lives.
SA 3	Kriegsmarine	The SA 1-class motor torpedo boat ran aground at Börsmose, Denmark, and was wrecked.
HMS Southwold	Royal Navy	World War II: The Hunt-class destroyer struck a mine and sank in the Mediterranean Sea off Valletta, Malta (35°53′N 14°35′E) with the loss of five of her 164 crew.
U-655	Kriegsmarine	World War II: The Type VIIC submarine was rammed and sunk in the Barents Sea (approximately 73°00′N 21°00′E) by HMS Sharpshooter (Royal Navy) with the loss of all 45 of her crew.
Yalta	Soviet Union	World War II: The tanker was sunk by Luftwaffe aircraft at Tuapse. She was later raised, and was repaired in 1945.

== 25 March ==
List of shipwrecks: 25 March 1942
Ship	State	Description
Narragansett	United Kingdom	World War II: The tanker (10,389 GRT) was torpedoed and sunk in the Atlantic Ocean about 400 miles east of Hampton Roads, Virginia (34°46′N 67°40′W) by U-105 (Kriegsmarine) with the loss of all 49 men aboard (43 crew and 6 gunners).
Ocana	Netherlands	World War II: The tanker (6,256 GRT) was torpedoed and burst into flames in the Atlantic Ocean about 70 miles southeast of Cape Sable, Nova Scotia(42°36′N 65°30′W) by U-552 (Kriegsmarine). 52 of her crew perished in the fire or while trying to abandon the ship. The four survivors were rescued by USS Mayo (United States Navy). The wreck remained afloat and several attempts were made to tow her until she started to sink and was sunk on 16 April at 43°24′N 64°45′W with gunfire by HMCS Burlington (Royal Canadian Navy).
SKA-0121	Soviet Navy	World War II: The MO-4 Type minesweeper (50 GRT) was set on fire by enemy artillery fire while being moored in Streletskaya Bay near Sevastopol. Two of her crew and one of SKA-0183 braved the fire to throw in the sea the depht charges and ammunition aboard and were killed when the ship finally exploded. Their sacrifice avoided a far bigger and deadlier explosion. One, senior sailor Ivan Golubets of SKA-0183, was awarded the title of Hero of the Soviet Union.
HMS Sulla	Royal Navy	World War II: Convoy PQ 13: The auxiliary minesweeper (251 GRT) foundered in a galdisappeared e in the Norwegian Sea off Bear Island, Norway (70°15′N 02°10′E) while being delivered to the Soviet Navy. She probably foundered due to heavy icing and was lost with all 21 hands.

== 26 March ==
List of shipwrecks: 26 March 1942
Ship	State	Description
Dixie Arrow	United States	Dixie Arrow World War II: Operation Drumbeat: The tanker (8,046 GRT) was torpedoed and sunk in the Atlantic Ocean off Cape Hatteras, North Carolina (34°55′30″N 75°44′42″W) by U-71 (Kriegsmarine) with the loss of eleven of her 33 crew. Survivors were rescued by USS Tarbell (United States Navy).
HMS Jaguar	Royal Navy	World War II: The J-class destroyer (1,690 GRT) was torpedoed and sunk in the Mediterranean Sea off Sidi Barrani, Egypt (31°53′N 26°18′E) by U-652 (Kriegsmarine) with the loss of three officers and 191 crew. Survivors, eight officers and 45 crew, were rescued by naval whaler HMS Klo (Royal Navy).
HMS Legion	Royal Navy	World War II: The L-class destroyer was bombed and sunk in the Grand Harbor, Valletta, Malta. She was eventually refloated and resunk in deep water.
HMS P39	Royal Navy	World War II: The U-class submarine was bombed and sunk in the Grand Harbor, Valletta. She was raised and beached unrepaired in 1943 and her wreck was bombed again.
Pampas	United Kingdom	World War II: The troopship was bombed and sunk at Malta by Luftwaffe aircraft. Her 60 crew survived.
RFA Slavol	Royal Fleet Auxiliary	World War II: The tanker was torpedoed and sunk in the Mediterranean Sea off Sidi Barrani (32°01′N 25°55′E) by U-652 (Kriegsmarine) with the loss of 36 of her 56 crew. Survivors were rescued by Vasilissa Olga (Hellenic Navy).
Sovietskaya Neft	Soviet Union	World War II: The tanker was bombed and sunk at Tuapse by Luftwaffe aircraft.
Talabot	Norway	World War II: The cargo ship was bombed and sunk at Valletta, Malta by Luftwaffe aircraft. She was refloated and scuttled in deep water in 1946, with final removal of the bottom of her hull in July 1985.

== 27 March ==
List of shipwrecks: 27 March 1942
Ship	State	Description
USS Atik	United States Navy	World War II: The Q-ship was torpedoed and sunk in the Atlantic Ocean off Norfolk, Virginia (35°38′N 70°14′W) by U-123 (Kriegsmarine) with the loss of all 141 crew.
Equipoise	Panama	World War II: The cargo ship was torpedoed and sunk in the Atlantic Ocean 60 nautical miles (110 km) south east of Cape Henry, Virginia, United States (36°36′N 74°45′W) by U-160 (Kriegsmarine) with the loss of 41 of her 54 crew. Survivors were rescued by USS Greer (United States Navy).
Kitano Maru	Japan	World War II: The cargo ship struck a mine and sank in the Lingayen Gulf, five miles (8.0 km) south of Damortis, Luzon, Philippines (16°11′N 120°19′E). Three of the 650 troops aboard were killed.
Nissho Maru	Japan	World War II: The cargo ship was torpedoed and sunk in the East China Sea south east of Kumun Island (33°50′N 127°33′E) by USS Gudgeon (United States Navy).
Oreste	Italy	World War II: The cargo ship struck a mine and sank in the Mediterranean Sea 13 nautical miles (24 km) south east of Cattaro. There were no casualties.
Sperrbrecher 147 Koert	Kriegsmarine	World War II: The Sperrbrecher struck a mine and sank in the North Sea off Vlissingen, Zeeland, Netherlands.
Staghound	United Kingdom	World War II: The coaster, now used as a blockship, was bombed and sunk in the English Channel at Torquay, Devon by Luftwaffe aircraft. There were no casualties. The wreck was later raised for use as one of two bombing targets by the military air gunnery range and weapons test site on St Thomas's Head.
RFA Svenør	Royal Fleet Auxiliary	World War II: The tanker (7,616 GRT) was torpedoed and sunk in the Atlantic Ocean 300 nautical miles (560 km) east of Cape Hatteras, North Carolina, United States by U-105 (Kriegsmarine) with the loss of eight of her 37 crew. Survivors were rescued by Cunene (Portugal).
U-587	Kriegsmarine	World War II: The Type VII submarine was depth charged and sunk in the Atlantic Ocean (47°21′N 21°39′W) by HMS Aldenham, HMS Grove, HMS Leamington and HMS Volunteer (all Royal Navy) with the loss of all 42 crew.
Yubari Maru	Imperial Japanese Navy	World War II: The Yubari Maru-class auxiliary collier was bombed and sunk off Koepang, Dutch Timor by Lockheed Hudson aircraft of 2 Squadron, Royal Australian Air Force. A crew member was killed. Asahi Maru (Imperial Japanese Navy) helps rescue survivors

== 28 March ==
List of shipwrecks: 28 March 1942
Ship	State	Description
HMS Campbelltown	Royal Navy	HMS Campbelltown before she exploded. World War II: St Nazaire Raid: The Town-class destroyer was expended as a floating bomb at Saint-Nazaire, Loire-Inférieure, France. She rammed the Normandie Dock drydock gates and later exploded killing about 350 people, mostly German military and some civilians. The forward section was destroyed by the explosion, the aft section was washed into the Dock, where it was scrapped by the Germans. The drydock was put out of action and not repaired until 1947. Surviving crew rescued by HMS ML 177 and HMS MTB 74 (both Royal Navy).
Cape Horn	United Kingdom	The cargo ship caught fire, exploded and sank in the Atlantic Ocean east of Ascension Island with the loss of four of her crew. The explosion may have been caused by a time bomb in her cargo.
Collingdoc	United Kingdom	World War II: The Admiralty-requisitioned cargo ship was scuttled in Water Sound, Scapa Flow as a blockship.
Empire Ranger	United Kingdom	World War II: Convoy PQ 13: The cargo ship was bombed and sunk in the Barents Sea (72°10′N 30°00′E) by Junkers Ju 88 aircraft of the Luftwaffe. All sixty-one crew were rescued by Z24 (Kriegsmarine). Two died later in captivity.
HMS MGB 314	Royal Navy	World War II: St Nazaire Raid: The Fairmile C motor gun boat was scuttled off Saint-Nazaire due to battle damage and bad weather. Two of her crew were killed.
HMS ML 156	Royal Navy	World War II: St Nazaire Raid: The Fairmile B motor launch) was scuttled off Saint-Nazaire due to battle damage and bad weather. Her crew were rescued by HMS Atherstone (Royal Navy).
HMS ML 177	Royal Navy	World War II: St Nazaire Raid: The Fairmile B motor launch was damaged at Saint-Nazaire by German shore batteries. She caught fire, burned out and was abandoned.
HMS ML 192	Royal Navy	World War II: St Nazaire Raid: The Fairmile B motor launch was shelled at Saint-Nazaire by German shore batteries, set on fire, struck the Old Mole and burned out. Four of her crew were killed.
HMS ML 262	Royal Navy	World War II: St Nazaire Raid: The Fairmile B motor launch was sunk at Saint-Nazaire by German shore batteries. She exploded after being abandoned. Seven of her sixteen crew were killed.
HMS ML 267	Royal Navy	World War II: St Nazaire Raid: The Fairmile B motor launch was sunk at Saint-Nazaire by German shore batteries.
HMS ML 268	Royal Navy	World War II: St Nazaire Raid: The Fairmile B motor launch was shelled by German shore batteries and exploded at Saint-Nazaire.
HMS ML 270	Royal Navy	World War II: St Nazaire Raid: The Fairmile B motor launch was scuttled off Saint-Nazaire due to battle damage and bad weather. Her crew were rescued by HMS Brocklesby (Royal Navy).
HMS ML 298	Royal Navy	World War II: St Nazaire Raid: The Fairmile B motor launch caught fire going through burning gasoline and was sunk at Saint-Nazaire by German shore batteries.
HMS ML 306	Royal Navy	World War II: St Nazaire Raid: The Fairmile B motor launch was shelled and damaged at Saint-Nazaire by German shore batteries, and then was captured by Jaguar (Kriegsmarine), but sank due to battle damage before it could be brought into dock. She was later salvaged by the Germans, repaired and put into Kriegsmarine service as RA 9.
HMS ML 446	Royal Navy	World War II: St Nazaire Raid: The Fairmile B motor launch was scuttled off Saint-Nazaire due to battle damage and bad weather. Her crew were rescued by HMS Atherstone (Royal Navy).
HMS ML 447	Royal Navy	World War II: St Nazaire Raid: The Fairmile B motor launch was sunk at Saint-Nazaire by German shore batteries. Her crew were rescued by HMS ML 160 (Royal Navy).
HMS ML 457	Royal Navy	World War II: St Nazaire Raid: The Fairmile B motor launch was sunk at Saint-Nazaire by German shore batteries.
HMS MTB 74	Royal Navy	World War II: St Nazaire Raid: The Vosper 70 foot-class motor torpedo boat was sunk at Saint-Nazaireby German shore batteries.
Raceland	Panama	World War II: Convoy PQ 13: The cargo ship was bombed and sunk in the Barents Sea 110 miles (180 km) northeast of North Cape, Norway (72°40′N 20°20′E) by Junkers Ju 88 aircraft of 3 Staffel, Kampfgeschwader 30, Luftwaffe. All 45 crew survived the sinking but only 13 were still alive when two of the lifeboats reached Norway days later. The two other lifeboats disappeared the first night. Survivors were made prisoners of war.
Sperrbrecher 137	Kriegsmarine	World War II: St Nazaire Raid: The Sperrbrecher, acting as a guard ship, was shelled and damaged at Saint-Nazaire by Royal Navy vessels and German shore batteries. She was scuttled by her crew to prevent capture. She was raised, repaired and returned to service.

== 29 March ==
List of shipwrecks: 29 March 1942
Ship	State	Description
Bateau	Panama	World War II: Convoy PQ 13: The cargo ship straggled behind the convoy. She was shelled sunk in the Barents Sea (72°30′N 27°00′E) by Z26 (Kriegsmarine) with the loss of 40 of her 46 crew. Survivors were taken as prisoners of war.
City of New York	United States	World War II: The cargo liner was torpedoed and sunk in the Atlantic Ocean 40 nautical miles (74 km) east of Cape Hatteras, North Carolina (35°16′N 74°25′W) by U-160 (Kriegsmarine) with the loss of 24 of the 133 people aboard. Survivors were rescued by USS Acushnet, USS Roper (both United States Navy) and USCGC CG-455 ( United States Coast Guard). City of New York was on a voyage from Cape Town, Union of South Africa to New York.
Galilea	Italy	World War II: The troopship was torpedoed and sunk in the Mediterranean Sea (39°04′N 20°05′E) by HMS Proteus (Royal Navy) with the loss of 768 lives.
Hertford	United Kingdom	World War II: The cargo ship was torpedoed and sunk in the Atlantic Ocean 200 nautical miles (370 km) south of Halifax, Nova Scotia, Canada (40°50′N 63°31′W) by U-571 (Kriegsmarine) with the loss of four of her 62 crew. Survivors were rescued by Glenstrae and Fort Townsend (both United Kingdom).
M 5608 Pinguin	Kriegsmarine	World War II: The naval drifter/minesweeper was sunk by a mine off Petsamo, Finland with the loss of eight lives.
Passat	Germany	World War II: St Nazaire Raid: The tanker was severely damaged by the explosion of HMS Campbeltown (Royal Navy at Saint-Nazaire, Loire-Inférieure, France.
SF 150	Kriegsmarine	The Siebel ferry was lost in a collision.
Schlettstadt	Germany	World War II: St Nazaire Raid: The tanker was severely damaged by the explosion of HMS Campbeltown (Royal Navy) at Saint-Nazaire.
Tredinnick1921	United Kingdom	World War II: The cargo ship was torpedoed and sunk in the South Atlantic off the coast of Brazil by Pietro Calvi (Regia Marina) with the loss of all 46 crew.
Voroshilov	Soviet Union	World War II: The transport ship was torpedoed and sunk at Ozeraja by Heinkel He 111 aircraft of the Luftwaffe. She was later refloated but was not repaired.
Z26	Kriegsmarine	World War II: Convoy PQ 13: The Type 1936A-class destroyer was shelled and sunk in the Barents Sea by HMS Trinidad and HMS Eclipse (both Royal Navy) with the loss of 240 of her 336 crew. Survivors were rescued by Z24 and Z25 (both Kriegsmarine).

== 30 March ==
List of shipwrecks: 30 March 1942
Ship	State	Description
Bosforo	Italy	World War II: The cargo ship was torpedoed west of Sapientza (36°38′N 21°18′E) by HMS Proteus (Royal Navy) and sank on the morning of 31 March. There were thirteen dead and 90 survivors.
Choko Maru	Japan	World War II: The cargo ship was torpedoed and sunk in the Makassar Strait by USS Sturgeon (United States Navy).
Effingham	United States	World War II: Convoy PQ 13: The cargo ship straggled behind the convoy. She was torpedoed and damaged in the Barents Sea by U-456 (Kriegsmarine) with the loss of twelve of her 43 crew. She was later torpedoed and sunk at 70°28′N 35°44′E by U-435 (Kriegsmarine). Survivors were rescued by HMS Harrier (Royal Navy) and a Soviet Navy patrol vessel.
Induna	United Kingdom	World War II: Convoy PQ 13: The cargo ship straggled behind the convoy. She was torpedoed and sunk in the Barents Sea (70°55′N 37°18′E) by U-376 (Kriegsmarine). Aboard were 40 crew, 10 gunners and 16 crew of Ballot who had left their ship when she was hit on the 29th. 25 men died in the sinking. The 41 survivors abandoned ship in two lifeboats but only 30 were still alive when they were rescued by the Soviet Navy minesweeper T-882 on 2 April, and two more died of exposure after their rescue, bringing the total to 38 dead.
Muncaster Castle	United Kingdom	World War II: The cargo ship was torpedoed and sunk in the Atlantic Ocean (2°02′N 12°02′W) by U-68 (Kriegsmarine) with the loss of 24 of the 329 people aboard. Survivors were rescued by Ann Stathatos ( Greece ) and HMS Aubrietia (Royal Navy). Muncaster Castle was on a voyage from Glasgow, Renfrewshire to Freetown, Sierra Leone.
U-585	Kriegsmarine	World War II: The Type VIIC submarine struck a mine and sank in the Barents Sea (70°00′N 34°00′E) with the loss of all 44 crew.
Wellpark	United Kingdom	World War II: The cargo ship was shelled and sunk in the South Atlantic by Thor (Kriegsmarine). Seven of her 48 crew were killed. Survivors were captured.

== 31 March ==
List of shipwrecks: 31 March 1942
Ship	State	Description
Allegheny	United States	World War II: The barge was shelled and sunk in the Atlantic Ocean 9.5 nautical miles (17.6 km) east-southeast of the Metopkin Inlet, Virginia (37°34′N 75°25′W) by U-754 (Kriegsmarine). Her three crew were rescued by USCGC CG-4345 ( United States Coast Guard).
Barnegat	United States	World War II: The barge was shelled and sunk in the Atlantic Ocean 9.5 nautical miles (17.6 km) east-southeast of the Metopkin Inlet (37°34′N 75°25′W) by U-754 (Kriegsmarine). Her three crew were rescued by USCGC CG-4345 ( United States Coast Guard).
London City	United Kingdom	World War II: The coal hulk was bombed and sunk at Torquay, Devon by Luftwaffe aircraft. There were no casualties.
Menominee	United States	World War II: The tug was shelled and sunk in the Atlantic Ocean 9.5 nautical miles (17.6 km) east-southeast of the Metopkin Inlet (37°34′N 75°25′W) by U-754 (Kriegsmarine) with the loss of sixteen of her eighteen crew. Survivors were rescued by Northern Sun (United States).
San Gerardo	United Kingdom	World War II: The tanker was torpedoed and sunk in the Atlantic Ocean (37°33′N 68°22′W) by U-71 (Kriegsmarine) with the loss of 51 of her 57 crew. Survivors were rescued by Regent Panther (United Kingdom).
T. C. McCobb	United States	World War II: The tanker was torpedoed and sunk in the South Atlantic off the coast of Brazil by Pietro Calvi (Regia Marina). Two of her crew were killed and two more died of exposure before being rescued.

== Unknown date ==
List of shipwrecks: Unknown date 1942
Ship	State	Description
Agustina	United States	The cargo ship was sunk by gunfire from an Imperial Japanese Navy destroyer at the port of Bugo in Macajalar Bay while taking on a stock of locally produced food for the relief of Bataan.
Bay Innaung	Burma	World War II: The incomplete Basset-class trawler was destroyed to prevent capture at the Irrawaddy Flotilla co. shipyard, Rangoon, sometime in March.
Cegostina	Philippines	The cargo ship was sunk by gunfire from an Imperial Japanese Navy destroyer at the port of Bugo in Macajalar Bay while taking on a stock of locally produced food for the relief of Bataan.
Cochrane	Burma	World War II: The incomplete Basset-class trawler was destroyed to prevent capture at the Irrawaddy Flotilla co. shipyard, Rangoon sometime in March.
Elara	Ceylon	World War II: The incomplete Basset-class trawler was destroyed to prevent capture at the Irrawaddy Flotilla co. shipyard, Rangoon sometime in March.
Emilia	Philippines	World War II: The cargo liner was sunk by gunfire from an Imperial Japanese Navy destroyer at the port of Bugo in Macajalar Bay while taking on a stock of locally produced food for the relief of Bataan.
Flip	Netherlands	World War II: Battle of Java: The tug was scuttled at Tjilatjap, Netherlands East Indies to avoid capture by Japanese forces in early March. She was salvaged by the Japanese.
Gemunu	Ceylon	World War II: The incomplete Basset-class trawler was destroyed to prevent capture at the Irrawaddy Flotilla co. shipyard, Rangoon sometime in March.
Hector	Netherlands	World War II: Battle of Java: The tug was scuttled at Tjilatjaps to avoid capture by Japanese forces in early March. She was salvaged by the Japanese.
HMS LCM 51	Royal Navy	The Landing Craft, Mechanized was lost in the Middle East sometime in March.
HMS LCM 53	Royal Navy	The Landing Craft, Mechanized was lost sometime in March.
HMS LCP(L) 57	Royal Navy	World War II: The Landing Craft Personnel (Large) was bombed and sunk at Tobruk, Libya.
HMS LCP(L) 117	Royal Navy	The Landing Craft Personnel (Large) was lost in Home Waters.
HMS LCP(L) 276	Royal Navy	The Landing Craft Personnel (Large) was lost sometime in March.
HMS LCP(L) 277	Royal Navy	The Landing Craft Personnel (Large) was lost sometime in March.
HMS LCT 155	Royal Navy	The Landing Craft, Tank was lost en route from the United Kingdom to Gibraltar sometime in March.
Myojin Maru No. 5	Imperial Japanese Navy	The auxiliary patrol craft went missing on 14 March.
Panay	Philippines	World War II: The United States Army-chartered cargo ship was bombed and/or torpedoed by Japanese aircraft and sank in 130 feet (40 m) of water in Campomanes Bay Sipalay, Negros Island (09°49′N 122°21′E), in late March.
HNLMS Pelikaan	Royal Netherlands Navy	World War II: The auxiliary depot/patrol vessel was scuttled in early March.
Perthshire	United Kingdom	World War II: The cargo ship was bombed and damaged at Malta by Axis aircraft. She was subsequently repaired and returned to service.
Shch-210	Soviet Navy	World War II: The Shchuka-class submarine was sunk near Cape Shabla, Romania sometime after 12 March, probably in Romanian minefield S-15.
HNLMS TM-3	Royal Netherlands Navy	World War II: Battle of Java: The TM-3-class motor torpedo boat was scuttled between 2 and 8 March at Surabaya, Netherlands East Indies to avoid capture by Japanese forces. She was later raised, repaired and put into Imperial Japanese Navy service without armament.
Unnamed	Royal Netherlands Navy	World War II: Battle of Java: The unnamed minelayer of a new design had been laid down at Soerabaja, Netherlands East Indies, but was destroyed on the stocks in early March in the early stages of construction to avoid capture by Japanese forces.
