= HNLMS Moera Boelian =

Royal Netherlands Navy Auxiliary

History

Netherlands
- Name: Moeara Boelian
- Builder: Tandjong Priok Drydock Co., Tanjung Priok
- Launched: 1930
- Commissioned: 1930 as MV Moeara Boelian
- Out of service: 2 March 1942
- Fate: Scuttled by own crew

General characteristics
- Type: Auxiliary, Tanker
- Displacement: 194 t (191 long tons) standard Empty load
- Length: 33.7 m (110 ft 7 in)
- Beam: 6.4 m (21 ft 0 in)
- Draught: 2.1 m (6 ft 11 in)
- Installed power: 120 hp (89 kW)
- Propulsion: 1 x Kromhout diesel engine
- Speed: 9 knots (17 km/h; 10 mph) normal

MV Moeara Boelian was a small merchant tanker. It was one of many commercial ships used as tankers for the Government Navy and later the Royal Netherlands Navy due to the lack of a dedicated tanker.

== Service history ==
From 1930 to the start of the war in the Pacific in 1941, Moeara Boelian was one of many tankers serving in the Netherlands East Indies to transport oil from the many drill sites. After the defeat of the Allies at the Battle of the Java Sea by the Imperial Japanese Navy, Moeara Boelian was trapped in Surabaya harbor. Unable to flee, the ship was scuttled by its own crew on 6 March 1942.

After the end of World War II, the ship did not go back to the Netherlands and was instead given to the Soviet Union as a war reprisal. It was eventually renamed Polyarnik and served with the Soviet Pacific Fleet. It was decommissioned sometime after 1985 and was stricken on 1987 or 1990 depending on the source.
