= HNLMS Castor =

Royal Netherlands Navy Auxiliary

History

Netherlands
- Name: Castor
- Builder: Marine Etablissement, Surabaya
- Launched: 1915
- Commissioned: 1915 Governments Navy; 1939 Royal Netherlands Navy
- Out of service: 2 March 1942
- Renamed: Osei Maru (In IJN Service)
- Namesake: Castor
- Fate: Scuttled by own crew

General characteristics
- Type: Auxiliary, Seaplane tender, Salvage ship
- Displacement: 670 long tons (680 t) standard
- Length: 53.8 m (176 ft 6 in)
- Beam: 8.9 m (29 ft 2 in)
- Draught: 3.4 m (11 ft 2 in)
- Installed power: 500 hp (370 kW)
- Propulsion: 2 × Werkspoor Diesel Engine
- Speed: 11 knots (20 km/h; 13 mph)
- Complement: 43
- Armament: 0-2 Machine guns; 1 x 7.5 cm cannon after militarisation

HNLMS Castor was a salvage ship and patrol boat in the Dutch East Indies serving for the Dienst der Bebakening en kustverlichting. The ship was named after the Greek Mythological figure of Castor and shared this namesake with the ship HNLMS Pollux.

Castor was militarized by the Royal Netherlands Navy upon the outbreak of World War II.

== Service history ==
HNLMS Castor served as a salvage ship and patrol boat with the Government Navy from the time of its commissioning until the outbreak of the second world war in Europe after which the Royal Netherlands Navy militarized the vessel and stationed it together with the HNLMS Pollux in Surabaya harbor.

The Castor would be used by the Royal Netherlands Navy as a seaplane tender supporting operations of Dutch Dornier Do 24 and Consolidated PBY Catalina flying boats.

The ship would be raised and repaired by Japanese forces and enter service under the name Osei Maru. It served as a salvage ship and cable layer until hitting a mine southeast of Shōdoshima that caused the loss of the ship.
