= German submarine U-332 =

German World War II submarine

History

Nazi Germany
- Name: U-332
- Ordered: 23 September 1939
- Builder: Nordseewerke, Emden
- Yard number: 204
- Laid down: 16 December 1939
- Launched: 22 March 1941
- Commissioned: 7 June 1941
- Fate: Sunk on 29 April 1943

General characteristics
- Class & type: Type VIIC submarine
- Displacement: 769 tonnes (757 long tons) surfaced; 871 t (857 long tons) submerged
- Length: 67.10 m (220 ft 2 in) o/a; 50.50 m (165 ft 8 in) pressure hull
- Beam: 6.20 m (20 ft 4 in) o/a; 4.70 m (15 ft 5 in) pressure hull
- Height: 9.60 m (31 ft 6 in)
- Draught: 4.74 m (15 ft 7 in)
- Installed power: 2,800–3,200 PS (2,100–2,400 kW; 2,800–3,200 bhp) (diesels); 750 PS (550 kW; 740 shp) (electric)
- Propulsion: 2 shafts; 2 × diesel engines; 2 × electric motors
- Speed: 17.7 knots (32.8 km/h; 20.4 mph) submerged; 7.6 knots (14.1 km/h; 8.7 mph) submerged
- Range: 8,500 nmi (15,700 km; 9,800 mi) at 10 knots (19 km/h; 12 mph) surfaced; 80 nmi (150 km; 92 mi) at 4 knots (7.4 km/h; 4.6 mph) submerged
- Test depth: 230 m (750 ft); Crush depth: 250–295 m (820–968 ft)
- Complement: 4 officers, 40–56 enlisted
- Armament: 5 × 53.3 cm (21 in) torpedo tubes (four bow, one stern); 14 × torpedoes or 26 TMA mines; 1 × 8.8 cm (3.46 in) deck gun (220 rounds); 1 x 2 cm (0.79 in) C/30 AA gun

Service record
- Part of: 3rd U-boat Flotilla; 7 June 1941 – 29 April 1943
- Identification codes: M 41 468
- Commanders: Kptlt. Johannes Liebe; 7 June 1941 – 27 January 1943; Oblt.z.S. Eberhard Hüttemann; 27 January – 29 April 1943
- Operations: 7 patrols: 1st patrol: 30 October – 16 December 1941; 2nd patrol: 27 January – 8 February 1942; 3rd patrol: 17 February – 10 April 1942; 4th patrol: 24 May – 1 August 1942; 5th patrol: 5 September – 6 December 1942; 6th patrol: 28 January – 24 March 1943; 7th patrol: 26 – 29 April 1943
- Victories: 8 merchant ships sunk (46,729 GRT); 1 merchant ship damaged (5,964 GRT)

German submarine U-332 was a Type VIIC U-boat of Nazi Germany's Kriegsmarine during World War II. She saw service in the Atlantic Ocean and Mediterranean Sea. Built in 1941 and 1942 at Nordsee-Werke, Emden, U-332 was a Type VIIC U-boat, capable of lengthy ocean patrols and of operating in distant environments.

== Design ==
German Type VIIC submarines were preceded by the shorter Type VIIB submarines. U-332 had a displacement of 769 tonnes (757 long tons) when at the surface and 871 tonnes (857 long tons) while submerged. She had a total length of 67.10 m (220 ft 2 in), a pressure hull length of 50.50 m (165 ft 8 in), a beam of 6.20 m (20 ft 4 in), a height of 9.60 m (31 ft 6 in), and a draught of 4.74 m (15 ft 7 in). The submarine was powered by two Germaniawerft F46 four-stroke, six-cylinder supercharged diesel engines producing a total of 2,800 to 3,200 metric horsepower (2,060 to 2,350 kW; 2,760 to 3,160 shp) for use while surfaced, two AEG GU 460/8–27 double-acting electric motors producing a total of 750 metric horsepower (550 kW; 740 shp) for use while submerged. She had two shafts and two 1.23 m (4 ft) propellers. The boat was capable of operating at depths of up to 230 metres (750 ft).

The submarine had a maximum surface speed of 17.7 knots (32.8 km/h; 20.4 mph) and a maximum submerged speed of 7.6 knots (14.1 km/h; 8.7 mph). When submerged, the boat could operate for 80 nautical miles (150 km; 92 mi) at 4 knots (7.4 km/h; 4.6 mph); when surfaced, she could travel 8,500 nautical miles (15,700 km; 9,800 mi) at 10 knots (19 km/h; 12 mph). U-332 was fitted with five 53.3 cm (21 in) torpedo tubes (four fitted at the bow and one at the stern), fourteen torpedoes, one 8.8 cm (3.46 in) SK C/35 naval gun, 220 rounds, and a 2 cm (0.79 in) C/30 anti-aircraft gun. The boat had a complement of between forty-four and sixty.

== Service history ==
U-332 was launched on 22 March 1941 and commissioned 7 June 1941.

=== Fate ===
On 29 April 1943 the boat was bombed and sunk by a RAF Liberator bomber of 224 Squadron off Cape Finisterre at 44°48′N 8°58′W. All 45 crew members died in the event.

=== Wolfpacks ===
U-332 took part in eight wolfpacks, namely:

- Störtebecker (17 – 19 November 1941)
- Benecke (19 November – 2 December 1941)
- Hartherz (3 – 7 February 1943)
- Ritter (11 – 23 February 1943)
- Sturmbock (23 – 26 February 1943)
- Burggraf (2 – 5 March 1943)
- Westmark (6 – 11 March 1943)
- Drossel (29 April 1943)

== Summary of raiding history ==
Date	Ship Name	Nationality	Tonnage (GRT)	Fate
13 March 1942	Albert F. Paul	United States	735	Sunk
13 March 1942	Trepca	Yugoslavia	5,042	Sunk
16 March 1942	Australia	United States	11,628	Sunk
19 March 1942	Liberator	United States	7,720	Sunk
28 June 1942	Raphael Semmes	United States	6,027	Sunk
19 July 1942	Leonidas M.	Greece	4,573	Sunk
29 September 1942	Registan	United Kingdom	6,008	Sunk
19 October 1942	Rothley	United Kingdom	4,996	Sunk
21 February 1943	Stigstad	Norway	5,964	Damaged

== Bibliography ==
- Busch, Rainer; Röll, Hans-Joachim (1999). German U-boat commanders of World War II : a biographical dictionary. Translated by Brooks, Geoffrey. London, Annapolis, Md: Greenhill Books, Naval Institute Press. ISBN 1-55750-186-6.
- Busch, Rainer; Röll, Hans-Joachim (1999). Der U-Boot-Krieg, 1939-1945: Deutsche U-Boot-Verluste von September 1939 bis Mai 1945 [German U-boat losses from September 1939 to May 1945] (in German). Vol. IV. Hamburg, Berlin, Bonn: Mittler. ISBN 3-8132-0514-2.
- Edwards, Bernard (1996). Dönitz and the Wolf Packs - The U-boats at War. Cassell Military Classics. p. 155. ISBN 0-304-35203-9.
- Gröner, Erich (1985). Die deutschen Kriegsschiffe 1815-1945 / 3, U-Boote, Hilfskreuzer, Minenschiffe, Netzleger, Sperrbrecher (in German). Koblenz: Bernard & Graefe. ISBN 3-7637-4802-4. OCLC 310610321.
- Gröner, Erich; Jung, Dieter; Maass, Martin (1991). U-boats and Mine Warfare Vessels. German Warships 1815–1945. Vol. 2. Translated by Thomas, Keith; Magowan, Rachel. London: Conway Maritime Press. ISBN 0-85177-593-4.
