= HMS Grove =

British ship

Coordinates: 32°5′N 25°30′E

History

United Kingdom
- Name: HMS Grove
- Builder: Swan Hunter, Tyne and Wear
- Laid down: 28 August 1940
- Launched: 29 May 1941
- Commissioned: 5 February 1942
- Honours and awards: ATLANTIC 1942; LIBYA 1942; ARCTIC 1942
- Fate: Torpedoed and sunk on 12 June 1942
- Badge: On a Field per fess wavy Red and Blue within a spur rowel upwards White, an escallop Gold

General characteristics
- Class & type: Type II Hunt-class destroyer
- Displacement: 1,050 long tons (1,070 t) standard; 1,430 long tons (1,450 t) full load
- Length: 279 ft 10 in (85.29 m) o/a
- Beam: 31 ft 6 in (9.60 m)
- Draught: 8 ft 3 in (2.51 m)
- Propulsion: Two Admiralty 3-drum boilers; Two shaft Parsons geared turbines, 19,000 shp
- Speed: 27 knots (50 km/h; 31 mph); 25.5 knots (47.2 km/h; 29.3 mph) full
- Range: 3,600 nmi (6,700 km) at 14 kn (26 km/h)
- Complement: 164
- Armament: 6 × QF 4 in Mark XVI on twin mounts Mk. XIX; 4 × QF 2 pdr Mk. VIII on quad mount MK.VII; 2 × 20 mm Oerlikons on single mounts P Mk. III; 110 depth charges, two throwers, three racks

HMS Grove (L77) was a Hunt-class destroyer of the Royal Navy. She had been completed in early 1942 at the Swan Hunter yard at Wallsend-on-Tyne.

== Service history ==
=== Initial success ===
Grove, along with other ships of the 2nd Escort Group, namely Aldenham, Volunteer and Leamington, had sunk the German submarine U-587. This followed a 'Huff Duff' (High frequency Direction finding) interception.

=== Loss ===
While escorting Convoy MW 11, Grove was hit by two torpedoes fired by U-77 on 12 June 1942. The ship sank with the loss of 110 men. The destroyer Tetcott rescued 79 survivors. She had been returning to Alexandria from Tobruk, having run aground at Tobruk, damaging the port propeller shaft and the screw itself; her speed had been reduced to 8.5 knots (15.7 km/h; 9.8 mph).
