= HNLMS Tankboot I =

Royal Netherlands Navy Auxiliary

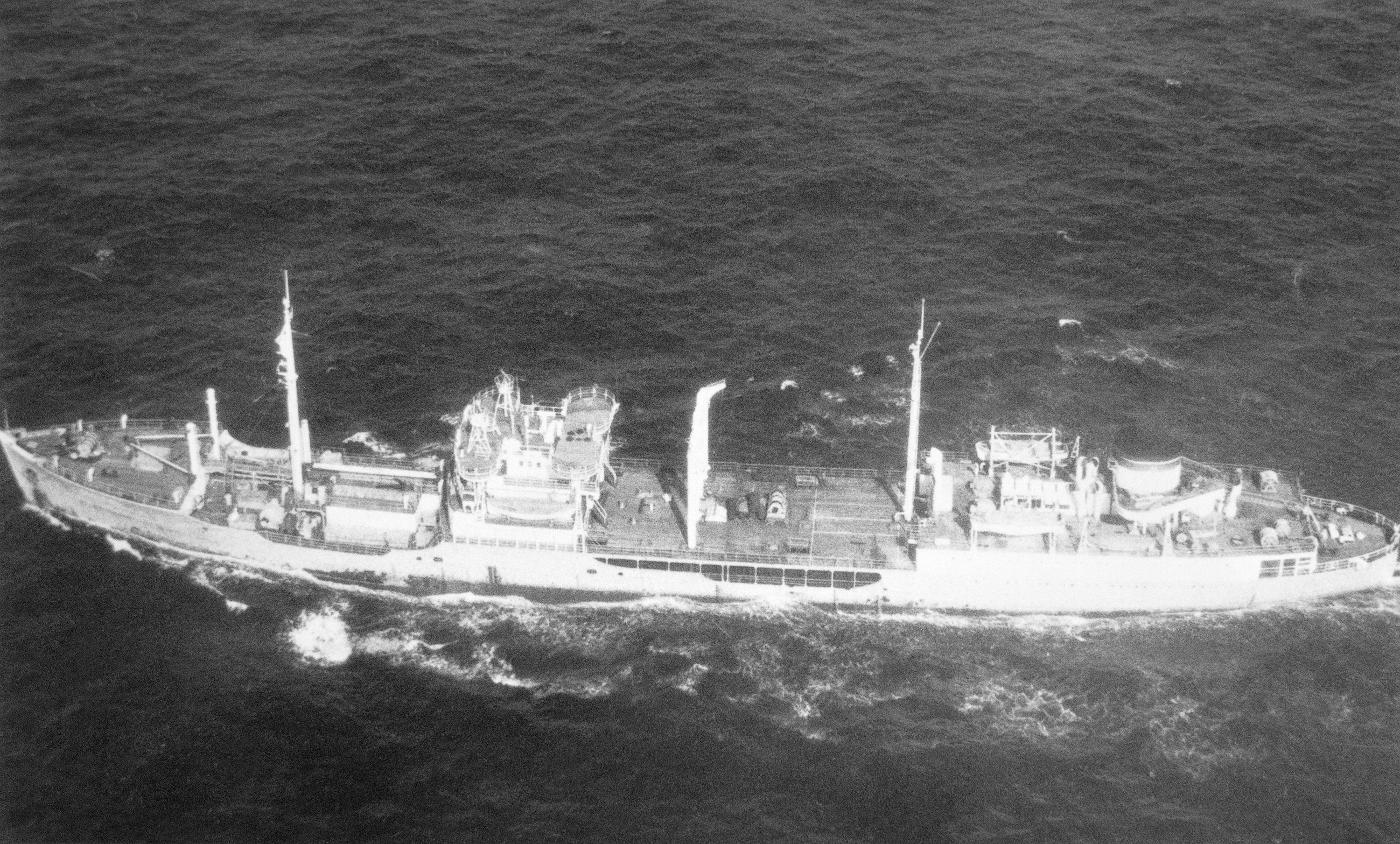
- The former Dutch Tankboot 1 and former German Kärnten, here as the Soviet Polyarnik class replenishment tanker.

History

Netherlands
- Name: Tankboot 1
- Builder: C. Van der Giessen & Zonen, Krimpen a/d IJssel
- Laid down: 14 December 1939
- Launched: 3 May 1941
- Commissioned: 27 October 1941 in German service
- Out of service: 1987 or 1990 (Soviet service)
- Renamed: Kärnten in German service (1941–1945); Polyarnik in Soviet service (1946–1990)
- Fate: Stricken in 1987 or 1990 depending on source

General characteristics
- Type: Auxiliary, tanker
- Displacement: 6,900 t (6,800 long tons) standard Deadweight; 15,000 t (15,000 long tons) standard Full load
- Length: 132.1 m (433 ft 5 in)
- Beam: 16.15 m (53 ft 0 in)
- Draught: 7.5 m (24 ft 7 in)
- Installed power: 7,000 hp (5,200 kW)
- Propulsion: 2 × Werkspoor 4-stroke 8-cylinder diesel engines
- Speed: 15.2 knots (28.2 km/h; 17.5 mph) normal; 17.1 knots (31.7 km/h; 19.7 mph) on trials
- Armament: As designed: 2 × single 120 mm (4.7 in) Cannons; 2 × twin40 mm (1.6 in) Bofors; Actual: 2 × single 75 mm (3.0 in) Cannons; 4 × single37 mm (1.5 in) Anti-air; 6 × single20 mm (0.79 in) Oerlikon; 2 × 75 mm (3.0 in) Rocket launchers
- Aircraft carried: 1 as designed, 0 actual

Tankboot 1 was the first Royal Netherlands Navy ordered tanker. Ships of the Royal Netherlands Navy had always been dependent on naval bases and commercial tankers that would be hired to support their operations, however, naval bases were not always nearby and commercial tankers had to be chartered weeks in advance, were too slow to keep up with a naval fleet, did not have proper equipment for refueling at sea, were unarmed and were very costly to hire. Because of these reasons the Royal Netherlands Navy decided they required their own tankers, fast enough to keep up with the fleet, armed well enough to be able to defend themselves and perhaps most importantly, available on short notice in case of an emergency.

However, Tankboot 1 would never operate with the Dutch, being captured intact but unfinished on stocks at the fall of the Netherlands. The ship was instead completed and commissioned by the German Kriegsmarine. After the war's end, the ship was not returned to the Netherlands but was awarded to the Soviet Union as a war reprisal. The vessel continued to serve into the late 1980s.

== Service history ==
The name Tankboot 1 was in all expectations a provisional name, the ship had not been properly named before it was captured by Germany which ordered the construction completed. The Kriegsmarine commissioned the ship as Kärnten. A second ship, presumably to be provisionally named Tankboot 2, had been planned but would never be constructed.

The Kärnten served the Kriegsmarine first as a fuel depot ship in the Netherlands. The ship was transferred to Norway where it served as a tanker for U-boats until its capture by Allied forces on 15 May 1945. The ship was then taken to Scotland where it was interned until the war's end.

After the end of World War II, the ship was not returned to the Netherlands. It was instead awarded to the Soviet Union as a war reprisal. It was renamed Polyarnik and served with the Soviet Pacific Fleet. It was decommissioned somewhere after 1985 and was stricken in 1987 or 1990 depending on the source.
