= Japanese destroyer Nowaki =

Two Japanese destroyers have been named Nowaki:

- Japanese destroyer Nowaki (1906), a Kamikaze-class destroyer launched in 1906 and stricken in 1924
- Japanese destroyer Nowaki (1940), a Kagerō-class destroyer launched in 1940 and sunk in 1944
