= HNLMS Pollux =

History

Netherlands
- Name: Pollux
- Namesake: Pollux
- Operator: Royal Netherlands Navy
- Builder: Verschure & Co., Amsterdam
- Launched: August 1922
- Commissioned: 1923
- Fate: Scrapped or sunk after August 1945

General characteristics
- Type: Steamship
- Displacement: 1,012 t (996 long tons)
- Length: 55.64 m (182 ft 7 in)
- Beam: 9.55 m (31 ft 4 in)
- Draught: 3.18 m (10 ft 5 in)
- Propulsion: 560 hp (420 kW); 1 x Triple expansion engine; 2 x Scotch marine boilers
- Speed: 10.5 knots (19.4 km/h; 12.1 mph)
- Capacity: 800 m^{3} (28,000 cu ft) gas storage
- Crew: 49
- Armament: 1 x 7.5 cm cannon

HNLMS Pollux was a steamship of the Dienst der Bebakening en kustverlichting. She was built in the Netherlands and used as lightship and beacon ship (Dutch: bebakeningsvaartuig). In 1939 the ship was militarized and taken into service of the Royal Netherlands Navy.

== Design and construction ==
Pollux was built at the shipyard Verschure & Co. in Amsterdam. In August 1922 the ship was launched and in December 1922 it left Amsterdam for Hellevoetsluis where it would perform its sea trials. The next year, in 1923, Pollux was commissioned into the Dienst der Bebakening en kustverlichting. The costs of building the Pollux was estimated to be 939.000 Dutch guilders.

The design of the Pollux was based on that of the Hoofdinspecteur Zeeman but with several modifications.

After being militarized the ship got equipped with a single 7.5 cm cannon on its front deck.

== Service history ==
In March 1929 Pollux was involved in the construction of a new beacon in Soerabaja which would mark the area that contained the Queen Olga reef.

=== Second World War ===
During the Second World War Pollux continued her lighting and beacon duties, which included making sure minefields were properly marked in the waters of the Dutch East Indies.

On 2 March 1942 the ship was scuttled by its own crew in Soerabaja. A year later, on 13 February 1943, Pollux was lifted by the Japanese and rebuild as the survey vessel Korai Maru. Later the ship was renamed Hoyo.

After the war, in August 1945, the ship was found damaged in Soerabaja. It was later either scrapped or sunk.
