= Italian submarine Enrico Tazzoli =

Enrico Tazzoli is the name of more than one Italian submarine, named after Enrico Tazzoli, a 19th century Italian Patriot.

- Enrico Tazzoli (1935), a Calvi-class submarine launched in 1935 and sunk in 1943.
- Enrico Tazzoli (S 511), a Gato-class submarine acquired in 1954 and sold in 1972 for scrapping which previously had served in the United States Navy as USS Barb.
