= ABC-class minesweeper =

Class overview
- Name: ABC class
- Builders: Tandjong Priok Drydock Co., Tanjung Priok
- Operators: Royal Netherlands Navy
- Preceded by: A
- Succeeded by: DEFG
- In service: 1938–1942
- Planned: 6
- Completed: 6
- Lost: 6

General characteristics
- Type: Minesweeper
- Displacement: 145 tons
- Length: 31.6 m (103 ft 8 in)
- Beam: 5.45 m (17 ft 11 in)
- Draught: 1.84 m (6 ft 0 in)
- Propulsion: 1 × 300 ihp (220 kW) Werkspoor diesel engine
- Speed: 12 knots (22 km/h)
- Complement: 17
- Armament: 2 × 37 mm (1.5 in) cannons; 2 × 7.7 mm (0.30 in) Lewis machine guns

The ABC class was a class of six police cruisers of the Government Navy used for fishery protection, counter smuggling and small personnel and cargo transport. Upon the declaration of war by the Netherlands on Japan following the Attack on Pearl Harbor, the entire class was commandeered by the Royal Netherlands Navy and would be militarized and converted to auxiliary minesweepers.

== Ships of class ==
Name	Construction yard	Completed	Fate
Alor	Tandjong Priok Drydock Co., Tanjung Priok	1938	Scuttled by own crew at Tanjung Priok on 2 March 1942 after the Battle of the Java Sea made it seemingly impossible to escape to Australia.
Aroe	Tandjong Priok Drydock Co., Tanjung Priok	1938	Scuttled by own crew at Tanjung Priok on 2 March 1942 after the Battle of the Java Sea made it seemingly impossible to escape to Australia.
Bantam	Tandjong Priok Drydock Co., Tanjung Priok	1938	Scuttled by own crew at Tanjung Priok on 2 March 1942 after the Battle of the Java Sea made it seemingly impossible to escape to Australia. Salvaged and repaired by Japanese forces, commissioned 10 August 1943 as submarine chaser Cha 117. Sunk by USS Hardhead on 23 July 1945.
Bogor	Tandjong Priok Drydock Co., Tanjung Priok	1938	Scuttled by own crew at Tanjung Priok on 2 March 1942 after the Battle of the Java Sea made it seemingly impossible to escape to Australia.
Ceram	Tandjong Priok Drydock Co., Tanjung Priok	1938	In February 1942 Ceram rescued 38 survivors from the troop transport Sloet van de Beele which was sunk by aircraft from the Japanese aircraft carrier Ryūjō. Scuttled by own crew at Tanjung Priok on 2 March 1942 after the Battle of the Java Sea made it seemingly impossible to escape to Australia.
Cheribon	Tandjong Priok Drydock Co., Tanjung Priok	1938	Scuttled by own crew at Tanjung Priok on 2 March 1942 after the Battle of the Java Sea made it seemingly impossible to escape to Australia.

== See also ==
- List of minesweepers of the Royal Netherlands Navy
