= List of ship commissionings in 1930 =

The list of ship commissionings in 1930 is a chronological list of ships commissioned in 1930. In cases where no official commissioning ceremony was held, the date of service entry may be used instead.

Date	Operator	Ship	Class and type	Notes	Ref
1 January	French Navy	Suffren	Suffren-class cruiser		
9 February	Royal Navy	Active	A-class destroyer		
11 February	Royal Navy	Acasta	A-class destroyer		
20 February	Royal Netherlands Navy	Witte de With	Admiralen-class destroyer		
27 March	Royal Navy	Achates	A-class destroyer		
14 April	Royal Navy	Ardent	A-class destroyer		
14 April	Royal Navy	Arrow	A-class destroyer		
16 April	Spanish Navy	C-5	C-class submarine		
30 April	Royal Navy	Norfolk	County-class cruiser		
1 May	Royal Navy	York	York-class cruiser		
2 May	Royal Netherlands Navy	Nautilus	Nautilus-class minelayer		
5 May	United States Bureau of Fisheries	Penguin	cargo liner	commissioning date unknown; in commission by 5 May 1930	
15 May	United States Navy	Narwhal	Narwhal-class submarine		
24 May	United States Navy	Aaron Ward	Wickes-class destroyer	recommissioned from reserve at San Diego	
4 June	Royal Navy	Codrington	A-class destroyer		
1 July	United States Navy	Nautilus	Narwhal-class submarine		
4 August	Royal Netherlands Navy	A	A-class minesweeper		
4 August	Royal Netherlands Navy	B	A-class minesweeper		
4 August	Royal Netherlands Navy	C	A-class minesweeper		
4 August	Royal Netherlands Navy	D	A-class minesweeper		
10 September	Royal Navy	Nelson	Nelson-class battleship		
27 September	Spanish Navy	C-6	C-class submarine		
30 September	Royal Navy	Dorsetshire	County-class cruiser		
5 November	United States Coast Guard	Abel P. Upshur	Clemson-class destroyer	transferred from the United States Navy, served in anti-smuggling operations	
14 November	Royal Netherlands Navy	Banckert	Admiralen-class destroyer		
unknown date	Republic of China Navy	Minquan	Gunboat		
