= Smeroe-class minesweeper =

Class overview
- Name: Smeroe class
- Builders: Soerabaja Drydock Co., Surabaya & Verenigde Prauwenveren, Batavia
- Operators: Royal Netherlands Navy
- Preceded by: DEFG class
- Succeeded by: Keeten class
- In service: 1941–1946
- Planned: 6
- Completed: 3 (+1 under Japanese occupation)
- Lost: 3
- Retired: 3

General characteristics
- Type: Minesweeper
- Displacement: 80 tons
- Length: 22.7 m (74 ft 6 in)
- Beam: 4.35 m (14 ft 3 in)
- Draught: 1.52 m (5 ft 0 in)
- Propulsion: 1 × 135 ihp (101 kW) Caterpillar diesel engine
- Speed: 10 knots (19 km/h)
- Complement: 14
- Armament: 1 or 2 × 7.7 mm (0.30 in) Lewis gun; Potentially also 1 × 12.7 mm (0.50 in) Machine gun

The Smeroe class was a class of six minesweepers. Based on the DEFG-class minesweeper, these ships were originally supposed to be small personnel and cargo transports but were converted for minesweeping while still under construction with the optional conversion back to transport for peacetime usage under the Government Navy.

== Ships of class ==
Name	Construction yard	Completed	Fate
Rindjani	Soerabaja Drydock Co., Surabaya	1941	Escaped to Australia after the Battle of the Java Sea. Served as a minesweeper stationed at Fremantle, returned to NEI after the war and served as a tug until at least 1946
Merbaboe	Soerabaja Drydock Co., Surabaya	1941	Escaped to Australia after the Battle of the Java Sea, returned to the NEI after the war and served at least until 1946
Smeroe	Soerabaja Drydock Co., Surabaya	1941	Escaped to Australia after the Battle of the Java Sea, returned to the NEI after the war and served at least until 1946
Merapi	Verenigde Prauwenveren, Batavia	Never commissioned	Scuttled on slipway 2 March 1942
Slamat	Verenigde Prauwenveren, Batavia	Never commissioned	Scuttled on slipway 2 March 1942
Tjerimai	Verenigde Prauwenveren, Batavia	1942 in Japanese service	Scuttled on slipway 2 March 1942, repaired by Japanese forces as submarine chaser Cha 101. Sunk by American aircraft near Celebes on 8 April 1945.

== See also ==
- List of minesweepers of the Royal Netherlands Navy
