= Ram-class minelayer =

Class of ship

Class overview
- Name: Ram class
- Builders: Droogdok Maatschappij Tandjong Priok, Tandjong Priok; Droogdok Maatschappij Soerabaja, Soerabaja
- Operators: Government Navy; Imperial Japanese Navy
- Planned: 2

General characteristics
- Type: Minelayer
- Displacement: 2,400 t (2,400 long tons)
- Length: 88 m (288 ft 9 in)
- Beam: 12.7 m (41 ft 8 in)
- Draft: 4.2 metres (13 ft 9 in)
- Propulsion: 2 propellers; 2,400 hp (1,800 kW); 2 x Enterprise diesel engines
- Speed: 15 knots (28 km/h; 17 mph)
- Crew: 120
- Armament: 2 x 7.5 cm cannons; 2 x 40 mm machine guns; 80 mines; 25 Depth charges

The Ram class was a ship class of two minelayers built in the Dutch East Indies for the Government Navy. However, before the minelayers could be completed the Dutch East Indies was invaded by the Japanese. As a result, the ships were completed as gunboats by the Japanese and taken into service of the Imperial Japanese Navy.

== History ==
The Ram class minelayers were originally built for the Government Navy. While the ships were still being built the Japanese invaded the Dutch East Indies. To prevent capture or destruction several measures were taken, such as towing the incomplete Ram to Tjilatjap in December 1941. As the invasion progressed and the Dutch were forced to retreat it was decided in March 1942 to destroy both ships.

== Design and construction ==
The two minelayers of the Ram class were built at different shipyards in the Dutch East Indies. Ram was built at the Droogdok Maatschappij Tandjong Priok, while Regulus was built at Droogdok Maatschappij Soerabaja. It was estimated that the construction of the ships would take one and a half years to be completed. The ships were at the time the largest ships to be built in the Dutch East Indies. Besides being minelayers, the ships could also function as seaplane tender.

=== Armament ===
When it came to armaments the Ram class minelayers were to be equipped with two 7.5 cm cannons, two 40 mm machine guns, 80 mines and 25 depth charges.

== Ships in class ==
Ram class construction data
Ship	Builder	Laid down	Launched	Fate
Ram	Droogdok Maatschappij Tandjong Priok, Tandjong Priok	1941	10 December 1941	Towed between 14 and 20 December to Tjilatjap. Destroyed by Dutch navy personnel in early March 1942. Later in May or June 1943 towed to Soerabaja by the Japanese and completed as the gunboat Nanshin. After the war found in August 1945 in Soerabaja and scrapped.
Regulus	Droogdok Maatschappij Soerabaja, Soerabaja	1941	-	On 2 March 1942 destroyed by Dutch navy personnel. Later repaired by the Japanese and launched on 21 May 1943 as the gunboat Nankai. Sunk on 16 July 1945 in the Java Sea after being hit by a torpedo of an American submarine.
