= B-class motor launch =

Royal Netherlands Navy ship class

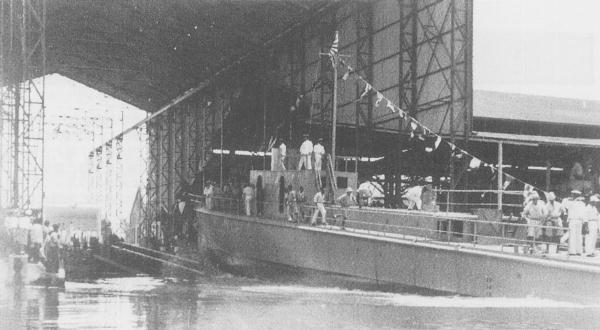
- Launch of Cha 105 in Soerabaja.

Class overview
- Name: B class
- Builders: Droogdok Maatschappij Soerabaja; Marine Etablissement te Soerabaja; Indische Maatschappij Palembang
- Operators: Royal Netherlands Navy; Imperial Japanese Navy
- Planned: 16

General characteristics
- Type: Motor launch
- Displacement: 130 t (130 long tons)
- Length: 45.5 m (149 ft 3 in)
- Beam: 5 m (16 ft 5 in)
- Draft: 1.4 m (4 ft 7 in)
- Propulsion: 2 propellers; 1,900 bhp (1,400 kW); Diesel engines
- Speed: 19 knots (35 km/h; 22 mph)
- Armament: 1 × 76 mm (3.0 in) naval gun; 1 × 40 mm (1.6 in) anti-aircraft gun; 2 × 12.7 mm (0.50 in) machine guns; 20 depth charges

The B class was a ship class of sixteen motor launches built in the Dutch East Indies for the Royal Netherlands Navy. However, before the motor launches could be completed the Dutch East Indies was invaded by the Japanese. To prevent the vessels from being captured they were scuttled. Nonetheless, seven motor launches were salvaged and completed as auxiliary submarine chasers by the Japanese and taken into service of the Imperial Japanese Navy as the Cha 103 class.

== Design and construction ==
The B-class motor launches were built in the Dutch East Indies at the shipyards of Droogdok Maatschappij Soerabaja, Marine Etablissement te Soerabaja and Indische Maatschappij Palembang. They were designed to be able to perform various roles such as auxiliary submarine chaser, patrol vessel and auxiliary minesweeper. The launches measured 45.5 meters (149 ft 3 in) in length, had a beam of 5.0 meters (16 ft 5 in) and a draft of 1.4 meters (4 ft 7 in). Furthermore, they had a displacement of 130 tons and were equipped with diesel engines that could produce 1,900 brake horsepower (1,400 kW). This allowed the launches to reach a maximum speed of 19 knots (35 km/h; 22 mph). As armament they had a single 76-millimeter (3 in) naval gun, a single 40 mm (1.6 in) anti-aircraft gun, two 12.7 mm (0.50 in) machine guns and 20 depth charges.

=== Cha 103 class ===
The seven motor launches that were salvaged and completed as auxiliary submarine chasers by the Japanese became known as the Cha 103 class. These submarine chasers were equipped with different diesel engines and armament in comparison to their original B class design. Four chasers (Cha 103, Cha 105, Cha 107 and Cha 108) were equipped with diesel engines that could produce 1,800 bhp (1,300 kW), which allowed them to reach a maximum speed of 20 knots (37 km/h; 23 mph). Two (Cha 114 and Cha 115) were equipped with diesel engines that could produce 1,500 bhp (1,100 kW), which allowed them to reach a maximum speed of 19 knots. While the last one, Cha 106, was equipped with diesel engines that could produce 1,200 bhp (890 kW), which allowed the chaser to reach a maximum speed of 16.5 knots (30.6 km/h; 19.0 mph). All auxiliary submarine chasers of the Cha 103 class were armed with a single 47 mm (1.9 in) Yamanouchi gun, a 13.2 mm (0.52 in) machine gun, a 7.7 mm (0.30 in) machine gun and two depth charge rails that could carry a total of 32 depth charges.

== See also ==
- C-class motor launch
