= DEFG-class minesweeper =

Class overview
- Name: DEFG class
- Builders: Soerabaja Drydock Co., Surabaya & Tandjong Priok Drydock Co., Tanjung Priok
- Operators: Royal Netherlands Navy
- Preceded by: ABC
- Succeeded by: Smeroe
- In service: 1941–1950
- Planned: 10
- Completed: 6 (+4 under Japanese occupation)
- Lost: 6
- Retired: 4 (Transferred to Indonesian Navy)

General characteristics
- Type: Minesweeper
- Displacement: 175 tons
- Length: 34.7 m (113 ft 10 in)
- Beam: 5.7 m (18 ft 8 in)
- Draught: 1.9 m (6 ft 3 in)
- Propulsion: 1 × 360 ihp (270 kW) Enterprise diesel engine
- Speed: 12.5 knots (23.2 km/h)
- Complement: 10
- Armament: 2 × 7.7 mm (0.30 in) Lewis machine guns

The DEFG class was a class of ten minesweepers. Officially classed as auxiliary minesweepers, these ships made up the bulk of the Dutch minesweeper capabilities in the Dutch East Indies. Derived from the preceding ABC class, they were constructed with future Government Navy usage in mind where they would most likely be used as patrol boats and small personnel and cargo transports.

== Ships of class ==
Name	Construction yard	Completed	Fate
Djember	Soerabaja Drydock Co., Surabaya	1941	Only ship of class to be equipped with a Benz diesel engine, granting it 350 ihp (260 kW) and a speed of 10.5 knots (19.4 km/h). Scuttled by own crew at Tanjung Priok on 1 March 1942 after the Battle of the Java Sea made it seemingly impossible to escape to Australia. Salvaged and repaired by Japanese forces, commissioned 20 February 1943 as Wa 104. Sunk on 12 April 1945 by HMS Stygian.
Djombang	Soerabaja Drydock Co., Surabaya	1941	Scuttled by own crew at Tanjung Priok on 1 March 1942 after the Battle of the Java Sea made it seemingly impossible to escape to Australia. Salvaged and repaired by Japanese forces, commissioned 31 August 1943 as Wa 106. Returned to Dutch forces after the war's end. To Indonesian Navy in 1950.
Digoel	Tandjong Priok Drydock Co., Tanjung Priok	1941	Scuttled by own crew at Tanjung Priok on the night of 1 March 1942 to 2 March 1942 after the Battle of the Java Sea made it seemingly impossible to escape to Australia.
Djampea	Soerabaja Drydock Co., Surabaya	1941	Scuttled by own crew at Tanjung Priok on 1 March 1942 after the Battle of the Java Sea made it seemingly impossible to escape to Australia. Salvaged and repaired in 1945 but not commissioned at that time. To Indonesian Navy in 1950.
Enggano	Tandjong Priok Drydock Co., Tanjung Priok	1941	Scuttled by own crew at Tanjung Priok on 2 March 1942 after the Battle of the Java Sea made it seemingly impossible to escape to Australia. Salvaged and repaired by Japanese forces, commissioned 31 August 1944 as Wa 107. Returned to Dutch forces in August 1945. To Indonesian Navy in 1950.
Endeh	Tandjong Priok Drydock Co., Tanjung Priok	1941	Attempted to escape Tanjung Priok on 2 March 1942 with a crew of 24 volunteers. Ended up in a gunfight with Japanese destroyers Shiokaze and Matsukaze soon after leaving the harbor. Seven crew members died, the other crew members escaped to shore only to be captured after reaching Java.
Flores	Tandjong Priok Drydock Co., Tanjung Priok	1943 in Japanese service	Scuttled while still unfinished on 2 March 1942. Repaired by Japanese forces and commissioned as Wa 101 on 25 June 1943. Struck a naval mine on 13 October 1943. Raised and brought back to port where it was damaged by bombs dropped by aircraft operating from USS Saratoga and HMS Illustrious on 17 May 1945. Returned to the Royal Netherlands Navy (RNN) in August 1945 and consequently repaired. To Indonesian Navy in 1950.
Fakfak	Tandjong Priok Drydock Co., Tanjung Priok	1943 in Japanese service	Scuttled while still unfinished 2 March 1942. Repaired by Japanese forces and commissioned as Wa 102 on 30 June 1943. Returned to RNN after the war, presumably scrapped due to bad state.
Grissee	Tandjong Priok Drydock Co., Tanjung Priok	1943 in Japanese service	Scuttled while still unfinished 2 March 1942. Repaired by Japanese forces and commissioned as Wa 105 on 30 June 1943. Sunk 25 May 1945 by HMS Trenchant.
Garoet	Tandjong Priok Drydock Co., Tanjung Priok	1943 in Japanese service	Scuttled while still unfinished 2 March 1942. Repaired by Japanese forces and commissioned as Wa 103 on 7 May 1943. Returned to Dutch forces in August 1945. To Indonesian Navy in 1950.

== See also ==
- List of minesweepers of the Royal Netherlands Navy
