= HNLMS Bantam =

Dutch minesweeper sunk and repaired by Japanese

History

Netherlands
- Name: Bantam
- Builder: Droogdok Maatschappij
- Launched: 1938, Tanjung Priok
- Fate: Scuttled, 2 March 1942

Empire of Japan
- Name: No. 117
- Acquired: Repaired by the Empire of Japan, 1943
- Commissioned: 10 August 1943
- Fate: Torpedoed and sunk, 23 July 1945

General characteristics
- Class & type: ABC-class minesweeper, later submarine chaser
- Displacement: 145 long tons (147 t) standard
- Length: 31.59 m (103 ft 8 in) overall
- Beam: 5.46 m (17 ft 11 in)
- Draught: 1.82 m (6 ft 0 in)
- Installed power: 296 bhp (as Bantam) 320 bhp (as No. 117)
- Speed: 12.0 knots (22.2 km/h; 13.8 mph)
- Complement: 17 (Bantam)
- Armament: Dutch: 2 × 3.7 cm cannon 2 × 7.7 mm (.303 caliber) Lewis machine gun; Japanese 1 x Type 4 15 cm howitzer 1 x Type 96 25 mm AT/AA Gun 1 x 13.2 mm machine gun (jp:ホ式十三粍高射機関砲) 12 depth charges

HNLMS Bantam (Dutch: Hr.Ms. Bantam) was an ABC-class auxiliary minesweeper (HMV 4) of the Royal Netherlands Navy that was scuttled by her crew during World War II. She was later re-floated and repaired by the Japanese and converted into auxiliary submarine chaser Cha-117 or No. 117 (Japanese: 第百十七號驅潜特務艇).

== History ==
She was launched and completed in 1938 at the Tanjung Priok, Java drydock of Droogdok Maatschappij and named Bantam after the city of Bantam on the Indonesian island of Java. She was one of six ships in her class (Alor, Aroe, Bantam, Bogor, Ceram, and Cheribon), built for the Gouvernementsmarine, the Dutch civil maritime law enforcement force for the Dutch East Indies, as coastal minesweepers. She was requisitioned by the Dutch Navy and set up as auxiliary minesweeper 4. On 2 March 1942, during the Battle of Java, she was scuttled in the harbor of Tandjong Priok.

She was raised by the Japanese and converted into submarine chaser No. 117. On 10 August 1943, her conversion was completed and she was commissioned into the Imperial Japanese Navy. She was mostly engaged in escort duties around Java. On 23 July 1945 she was torpedoed and sunk by the American submarine USS Hardhead off the northeast coast of Bali at coordinates (08°10′S 115°29′E).
