= Japanese gunboat Nankai =

Dutch ship

History

Empire of Japan
- Name: Nankai
- Builder: Droogdok Maatschappij Soerabaja, Soerabaja
- Laid down: 1941
- Launched: 21 May 1943
- Acquired: 8 March 1942
- Commissioned: 7 June 1944
- Stricken: 30 July 1945
- Fate: Sunk, 16 July 1945
- Notes: Call sign: JFPQ

General characteristics
- Class & type: Ram-class minelayer (originally)
- Displacement: 2,200 long tons (2,235 t) (standard)
- Length: 85.8 m (281 ft 6 in) (o/a)
- Beam: 11 m (36 ft 1 in)
- Draught: 3.8 m (12 ft 6 in)
- Installed power: 4,800 bhp (3,600 kW)
- Propulsion: 2 × shafts; 2 × diesel engines
- Speed: 18 knots (33 km/h; 21 mph)
- Complement: 120
- Armament: 2 × Type 10 120 mm AA gun; 4 × 2.5 cm (1 in) Type 96 AA guns; Depth charges or mines

Nankai (Japanese: 南海) was originally named Regulus, a Dutch Ram-class auxiliary minelayer built for the Government Navy during the Second World War. The ship was launched a few days after the start of the Pacific War in December 1941. Still incomplete, she was scuttled by the Dutch in March 1942 to prevent her capture by the Japanese, but the Imperial Japanese Navy refloated the ship and converted her into a gunboat.

== Description ==
The Ram-class ships had a standard displacement of 2,200 long tons (2,235 t). They measured 85.8 metres (281 ft 6 in) long overall with a beam of 11 m (36 ft 1 in) and a draught of 3.8 m (12 ft 6 in). The minelayers were powered by two 2,400-brake-horsepower (1,800 kW) diesel engines, each driving one propeller shaft. They had a maximum speed of 18 knots (33 km/h; 21 mph). The Ram class had a complement of 120 officers and ratings.

The Dutch intended the ship to be armed with three 75 mm (3 in) anti-aircraft (AA) guns, but the Japanese rearmed Nankai with two 12-centimetre (4.7 in) Type 10 AA guns, four 2.5-centimetre (1 in) Type 96 AA guns and an unknown number of depth charges or mines.

== Construction and career ==
She was laid down in 1941 at the Droogdok Maatschappij Soerabaja as an auxiliary minelayer for the benefit of the Gouvernementsmarineand named Regulus. She was scuttled before completion by Dutch forces on 2 March 1942 after the Japanese occupation of the Dutch East Indies. She was seized by the Japanese, repaired and rebuilt as a gunboat. The ship was launched on 21 April 1943 under the name of Nankai and was completed on 7 June 1944.

On 21 September 1944, Nankai departed Surabaya, Java, escorting transport Hokkai Maru. On 23 September 1944, Nankai and Hokkai Maru both struck mines laid by the submarine USS Bowfin, 15 miles (24 km) west of Sebuku Island at 03°37′S 116°25′E, leaving both ships crippled. Nankai and Hokkai Maru were towed and repaired at the No. 102 Naval Construction and Repair Department at Surabaya.

On 16 July 1945, while being escorted by the No.1-class submarine chaser CH-1, she was torpedoed and sunk by USS Blenny at 05°26′S 110°33′E, 150 miles (240 km) west of Surabaya. Nankai was struck from the Navy List on 30 July 1945.

== Bibliography ==
- Jentschura, Hansgeorg; Jung, Dieter & Mickel, Peter (1977). Warships of the Imperial Japanese Navy, 1869–1945. Annapolis, Maryland: United States Naval Institute. ISBN 978-0-87021-893-4.
- Roberts, John (1980). "The Netherlands". In Chesneau, Roger (ed.). Conway's All the World's Fighting Ships 1922–1946. Conway Maritime Press. pp. 385–396. ISBN 0-85177-146-7.
- Womack, Tom (2015). The Allied Defense of the Malay Barrier, 1941-1942. McFarland & Company. ISBN 978-1-4766-6293-0.
