= USS Blenny =

Balao-class submarine

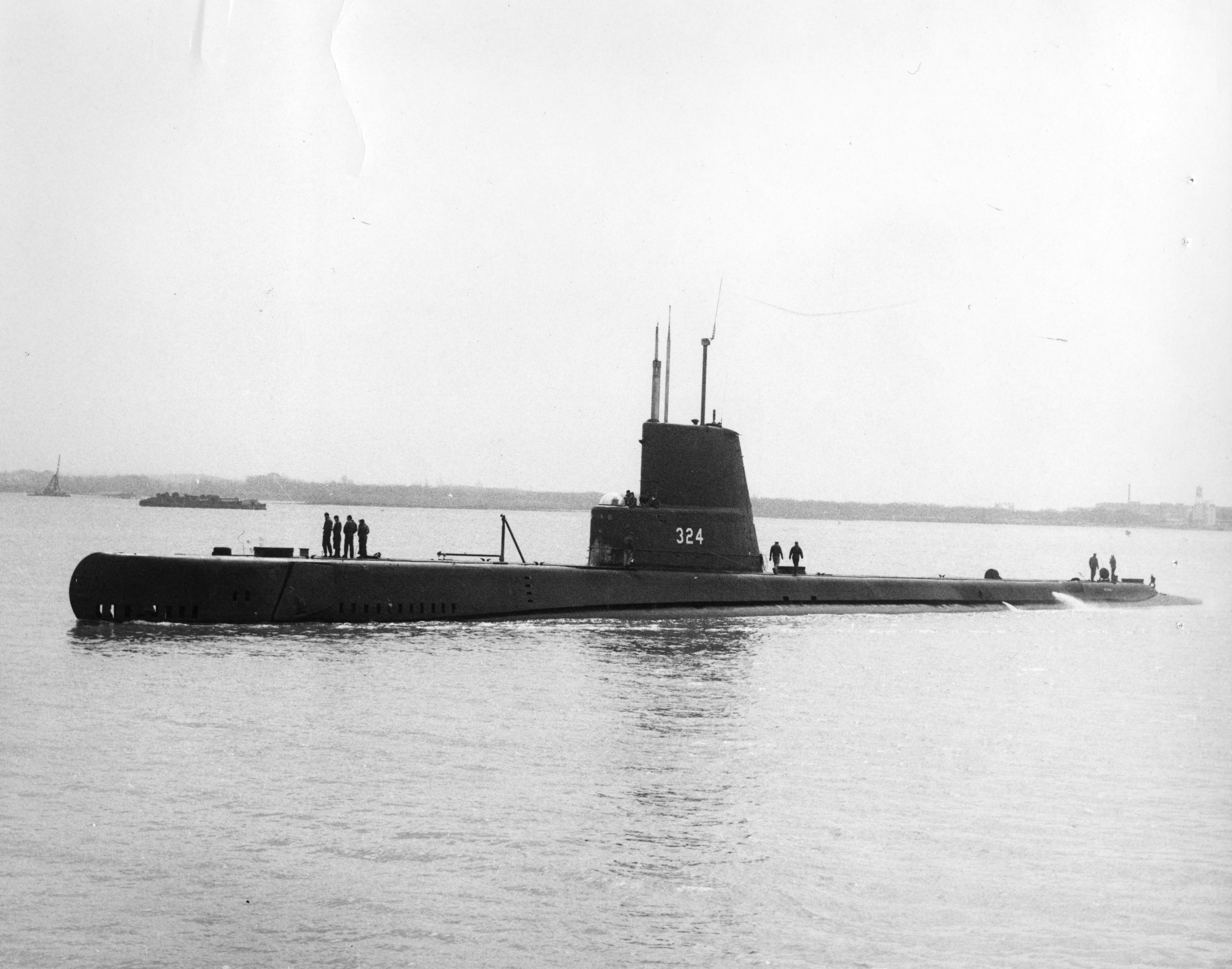
- USS Blenny (SS-324) on 31 March 1964, possibly at Philadelphia, Pennsylvania.

History

United States
- Name: USS Blenny
- Ordered: 9 July 1942
- Builder: Electric Boat Company, Groton, Connecticut
- Laid down: 8 July 1943
- Launched: 9 April 1944
- Commissioned: 27 June 1944
- Decommissioned: 7 November 1969
- Stricken: 15 August 1973
- Fate: Scuttled 7 June 1989

General characteristics (As completed)
- Class & type: Balao-class diesel-electric submarine
- Displacement: 1,526 long tons (1,550 t) surfaced; 2,424 tons (2,463 t) submerged
- Length: 311 ft 9 in (95.02 m)
- Beam: 27 ft 3 in (8.31 m)
- Draft: 16 ft 10 in (5.13 m) maximum
- Propulsion: 4 × General Motors Model 16-278A V16 diesel engines driving electrical generators; 2 × 126-cell Sargo batteries; 4 × high-speed General Electric electric motors with reduction gears; 2 × propellers; 5,400 shp (4.0 MW) surfaced; 2,740 shp (2.0 MW) submerged
- Speed: 20.25 knots (38 km/h) surfaced; 8.75 knots (16 km/h) submerged
- Range: 11,000 nautical miles (20,000 km) surfaced at 10 knots (19 km/h)
- Endurance: 48 hours at 2 knots (3.7 km/h) submerged; 75 days on patrol
- Test depth: 400 ft (120 m)
- Complement: 10 officers, 70–71 enlisted
- Armament: 10 × 21-inch (533 mm) torpedo tubes; 6 forward, 4 aft; 24 torpedoes; 1 × 5-inch (127 mm) / 25 caliber deck gun; Bofors 40 mm and Oerlikon 20 mm cannon

General characteristics (Guppy IA)
- Class & type: none
- Displacement: 1,830 tons (1,859 t) surfaced; 2,440 tons (2,479 t) submerged
- Length: 307 ft 7 in (93.75 m)
- Beam: 27 ft 4 in (8.33 m)
- Draft: 17 ft (5.2 m)
- Propulsion: Snorkel added; Batteries upgraded to Sargo II
- Speed: Surfaced: 17.3 knots (32.0 km/h) maximum; 12.5 knots (23.2 km/h) cruising; Submerged: 15.0 knots (27.8 km/h) for ½ hour; 7.5 knots (13.9 km/h) snorkeling; 3.0 knots (5.6 km/h) cruising
- Range: 17,000 nmi (31,000 km) surfaced at 11 knots (20 km/h)
- Endurance: 36 hours at 3 knots (6 km/h) submerged
- Complement: 10 officers; 5 petty officers; 64–69 enlisted men
- Armament: 10 × 21 inch (533 mm) torpedo tubes; (six forward, four aft); all guns removed

USS Blenny (SS/AGSS-324), a Balao-class submarine in commission from 1944 to 1969, was a ship of the United States Navy named for the blenny, a fish found along the rocky shores of the Atlantic Ocean. During World War II, Blenny conducted four war patrols in the Java Sea and South China Sea between 10 November 1944 and 14 August 1945. She sank eight Japanese vessels totaling 18,262 tons. In addition, she is credited with destroying more than 62 miscellaneous Japanese small craft by gunfire.

After World War II, Blenny served in the United States Pacific Fleet along the United States West Coast. She also visited Alaska, Hawaii, Canada, Japan and China and conducted a war patrol during the Korean War. She later transferred to the United States Atlantic Fleet and served in the Atlantic Ocean and the Mediterranean Sea. She was scuttled as part of an artificial reef in 1989.

== Construction and commissioning ==
Blenny (SS-324) was laid down on 8 July 1943 by the Electric Boat Company at Groton, Connecticut. She was launched on 9 April 1944, sponsored by Miss Florence King, daughter of the Chief of Naval Operations, Admiral Ernest J. King, and commissioned on 27 June 1944 with Lieutenant Commander William H. Hazzard in command.

== Service history ==
=== World War II ===
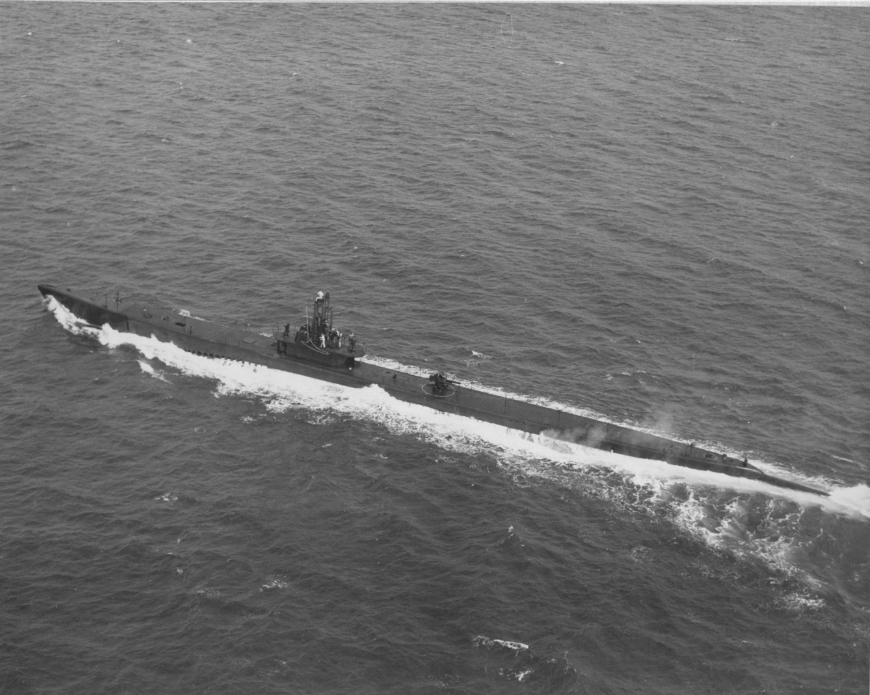
USS Blenny in Long Island Sound on 21 August 1944.

==== July–October 1944 ====
Following training at Naval Submarine Base New London in Groton and at Newport, Rhode Island, Blenny got underway for Key West, Florida, on 29 August 1944. She arrived at Key West on 5 September 1944 and trained at the Fleet Sound School there. She then headed for the Panama Canal, transiting it on 19 September 1944, and departed Balboa, Panama Canal Zone, on 28 September 1944. She reached Pearl Harbor, Hawaii, on 15 October 1944.

==== First war patrol ====
On 10 November 1944, Blenny stood out of Pearl Harbor to begin her first war patrol. After fueling at Saipan in the Mariana Islands on 22 November 1944, she departed on 23 November bound for a patrol area off the coast of Luzon in the Philippine Islands. On 1 December 1944, she fired a single torpedo at a Japanese escort vessel but missed. The Japanese retaliated with a severe, but unsuccessful, depth-charge attack. On 6 December, she escaped unscathed from another close call when a low-flying Japanese plane dropped two bombs that near-missed Blenny.

On 14 December 1944, Blenny claimed her first two successes. In the morning, she made a surface gun attack on a Japanese 300-gross register ton "sea truck" — the U.S. term for a type of small cargo ship — and sank it. Late that night, she sank the 800-displacement ton frigate Coast Defense Vessel No. 28 with torpedoes in a surface attack. On 23 December, Blenny torpedoed and sank what she thought was a 10,000-ton transport which after the war was identified as the Japanese 4,156-gross register ton cargo ship Kenzui Maru. Her parting shot of the patrol came on 27 December 1944 when she fired torpedoes at an unidentified cargo ship and claimed to have damaged her, although Japanese records did not substantiate the claim. Blenny set course for Fremantle, Australia on 31 December 1944 and arrived there on 13 January 1945 to begin a refit, concluding her patrol.

==== Second war patrol ====
Blenny departed Fremantle to embark upon her second war patrol on 5 February 1945. This time her patrol area was in the South China Sea off the coast of Japanese-occupied French Indochina. On 20 February, she made an unsuccessful submerged attack on a Japanese convoy escorted by two destroyers. The attack did not succeed, and she suffered through a series of depth-charge attacks from the convoy's escorts which also proved unsuccessful. On the night of 26 February 1945, she encountered the Japanese 10,238-gross register ton tanker Amato Maru and sank her with a spread of torpedoes. Though Blenny also claimed to have damaged two similar ships, a postwar check of Japanese records failed to corroborate that claim.

On 28 February 1945, Blenny received orders to put into Subic Bay on Luzon to reload torpedoes, and she arrived there on 2 March. She returned to her patrol area on 4 March. Sixteen days later, she had her most successful day of the war on 20 March 1945 when she sank three Japanese ships in one 24-hour period: the 500-gross register ton cargo ship Yamakuni Maru, the 834-gross register ton No. 21 Nanahin Maru, and the 1,039-gross register ton cargo ship Hosen Maru. After receiving two rescued aircrewmen from the submarine USS Blueback (SS-326) on 25 March 1945, she set a course for Subic Bay and a refit.

==== Third war patrol ====
On 16 April 1945, Blenny put to sea for her third war patrol, assigned a patrol area in the South China Sea off French Indochina in which she was to perform lifeguard duty to rescue ditched United States Army Air Forces aircrews. She sighted no Japanese ships during her time in the South China Sea and returned to Subic Bay on 16 May 1945 to take on additional fuel. On 18 May she returned to sea to resume her patrol and shaped a course for a new patrol area in the Java Sea.

On 25 May 1945, Blenny encountered a small Japanese submarine chaser close inshore. She had to make her approach to an attack position in relatively shallow water, so she flooded down and backed awash toward the shore and the submarine chaser while a sailor on her fantail took depth soundings with a lead line. She fired torpedoes from her stern torpedo tubes and claimed to have sunk the submarine chaser, although she estimated the submarine chaser to be of only 170 tons displacement and the postwar survey counted only vessels of 500 tons or more, making her claim impossible to verify.

On 30 May 1945, Blenny sank a small lugger with gunfire, then encountered the Japanese 520-gross register ton cargo ship Hokoku Maru and sank her in a daylight attack. On 5 June 1945, she departed the Java area and set a course for Fremantle, Australia. She arrived at Fremantle on 9 June 1945 and commenced a refit.

==== Fourth war patrol ====
Blenny embarked upon her fourth war patrol on 5 July 1945. Departing Fremantle, she shaped a course for a patrol area in the Java Sea and north from there to the eastern coast of Japanese-occupied British Malaya. On 11 July 1945 she made her first kill of the patrol by sinking a "sea truck" by gunfire. On 16 July she torpedoed and sank the converted Japanese gunboat Nankai in the Java Sea 150 nautical miles (278 km; 173 mi) west of Surabaya, Java, at 05°26′S 110°33′E. She then engaged a small vessel that had been in company with Nankai, but her gunfire failed to inflict much damage on the vessel because of extreme range and Blenny′s inability to close with the vessel.

For the remainder of the patrol, Blenny encountered only sampans, junks, and the like, sinking a large number of them after ascertaining their nationality and seeing to the safety of their crews. On 3 August 1945, she stopped a sampan and rescued from it a boarding party of U.S. sailors from the submarine USS Cod (SS-224) which Cod had been forced to abandon two days earlier when she crash-dived to avoid being strafed by an approaching Japanese plane. On 7 August, a Japanese plane attacked Blenny, dropping a small bomb which missed, and Blenny dove to evade.

On 11 August 1945, Blenny left her patrol area and shaped a course for Subic Bay, which she reached on 14 August 1945, concluding her patrol. On 15 August 1945, World War II came to an end with the cessation of hostilities with Japan.

=== Post-World War II ===
==== 1945–1954 ====
After completing a refit, Blenny departed Subic Bay on 31 August 1945. She arrived at Guam in the Mariana Islands on 5 September 1945 and began a series of training exercises. She remained in the Marianas until 12 January 1946, when she got underway for the United States. She made a two-day stop at Pearl Harbor before arriving in San Diego, California, on 30 January 1946. She stayed there for two months before shifting to San Francisco, California, on 30 March 1946. During the summer of 1946, she operated along the United States West Coast.

On 2 August 1946, Blenny departed San Diego and headed, via Pearl Harbor, for the Far East. She arrived at Subic Bay late in August 1946 and remained there until 2 September, at which time she got underway for Tsingtao, China. She served in Chinese waters, at Tsingtao and Shanghai, until late October 1946. After operations in Japanese waters which lasted until 3 November 1946, she set a course for San Diego, which she reached in late November 1946.

Blenny remained at San Diego until 17 February 1947, when she got underway for Pearl Harbor. She arrived at Pearl Harbor on 10 March 1947 and stayed until 18 March, when she headed back to San Diego. She arrived at San Diego on 8 April 1947 and then operated along the coast of California through the end of July. On 30 July 1947, she got underway from San Diego on a United States Naval Reserve training cruise to the Pacific Northwest, during which she visited ports in Washington and British Columbia in Canada. She resumed operations along the coast of California late in August 1947. She made two winter cruises in Alaskan waters in 1947–1948 and 1948–1949 and made a midshipman cruise to Canada. In July 1950, she began a voyage to Pearl Harbor, then, after participating in fleet maneuvers off Hawaii, returned to San Diego early in August 1950. When not otherwise engaged, Blenny conducted operations along the U.S. West Coast during these years.

In 1951, Blenny underwent conversion under the Greater Underwater Propulsion Power (GUPPY) Program to a GUPPY IA. After its completion, she operated along the U.S. West Coast until 30 April 1952, when she got underway for Pearl Harbor, then continued across the Pacific for a cruise in the Far East, arriving in Yokosuka, Japan, on 24 May 1952. While in the Far East, Blenny conducted routine United States Seventh Fleet operations and made a 35-day reconnaissance war patrol off the Korean Peninsula during the Korean War. She departed Yokosuka to return to the United States on 18 October 1952. After stops at Chichi Jima in the Volcano Islands and Pearl Harbor, she arrived at San Diego early in November 1952.

Blenny resumed operations along the U.S. West Coast until she was reassigned to the United States Atlantic Fleet in the spring of 1954. On 11 May 1954 she stood out of San Diego and shaped a course for the Panama Canal. She transited the canal on 24 May 1954 and headed for Naval Submarine Base New London at Groton, Connecticut, which she reached on 9 June 1954.

==== 1954–1969 ====
Operating from Naval Submarine Base New London, Blenny participated from 1954 until the early 1960s in U.S. Atlantic Fleet, North Atlantic Treaty Organization (NATO), and antisubmarine warfare exercises, in addition to operating with a U.S. Navy submarine development group engaged in evaluating new equipment. Her primary mission was the development of attack submarine tactics and antisubmarine warfare tactics, but she also test-fired new types of torpedoes. During these years, her operations took her as far south as the British West Indies and as far north as the coast of Newfoundland.

In the early 1960s, Blenny began making periodic deployments to the Mediterranean Sea for duty with the United States Sixth Fleet, alternating between tours of duty with the Sixth Fleet and extended assignments in the western Atlantic Ocean, where she conducted test and evaluation operations and took part in antisubmarine warfare training. Sometime in 1969, she was reclassified as an auxiliary submarine and given the hull classification symbol AGSS-324.

== Decommissioning and disposal ==
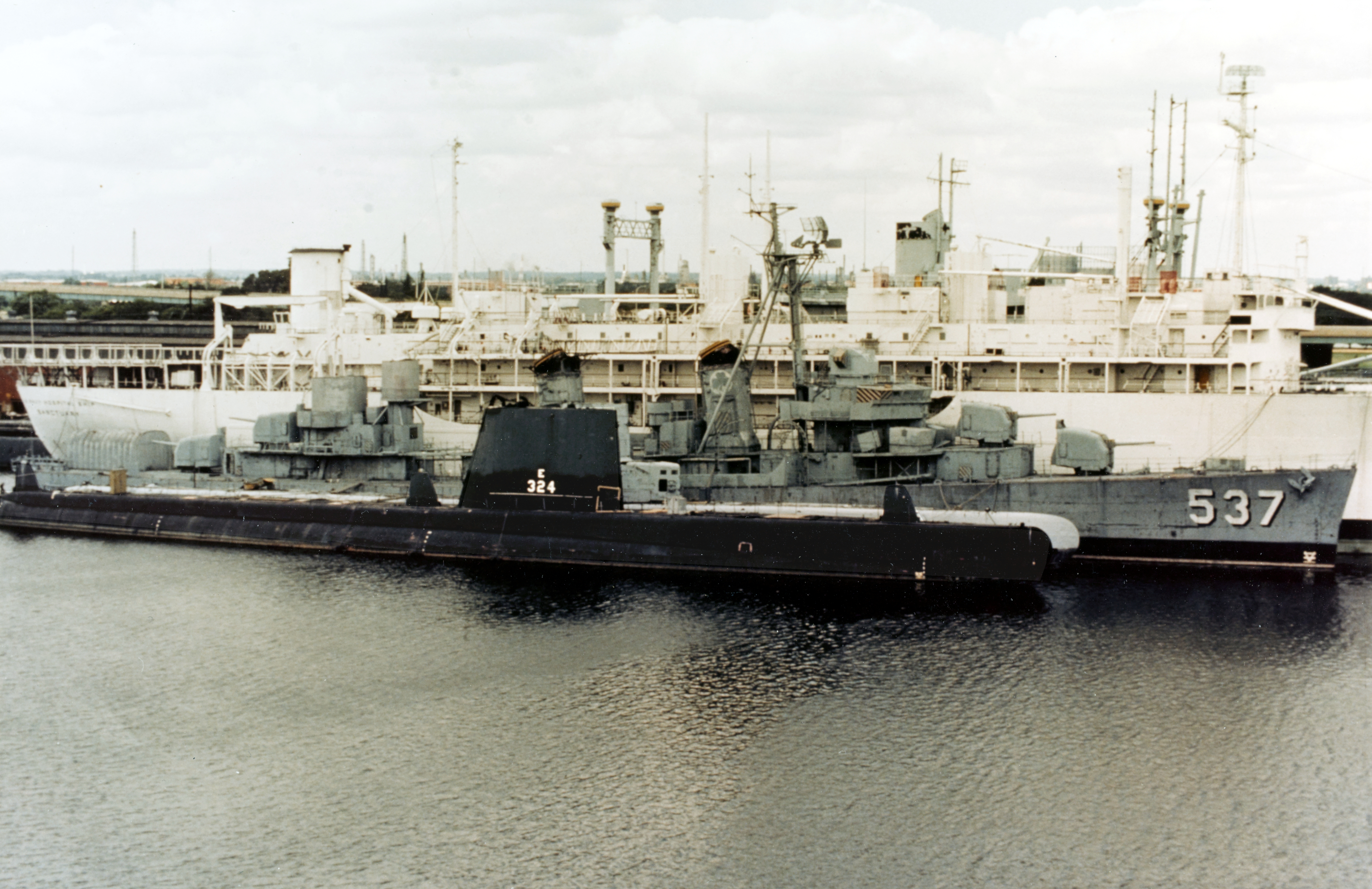
Mothballed USS Blenny at Philadelphia Naval Shipyard, August 1976

In September 1969, Blenny was placed in commission, in reserve. She was decommissioned on 7 November 1969 and laid up in the Atlantic Reserve Fleet, berthed initially at Philadelphia, Pennsylvania. Her name was stricken from the Naval Vessel Register on 15 August 1973.

Blenny subsequently was moved to Portsmouth, Virginia. She remained there until 3 July 1979, when she was moved to Naval Station Norfolk at Norfolk, Virginia. Plans made in 1984 to sink her as a target during an exercise were cancelled. Instead a decision was made in 1987 to donate her to the State of Maryland for use as an artificial reef. She was scuttled on 7 June 1989 to form part of an artificial reef in the Atlantic Ocean about 15 nautical miles (28 km; 17 mi) off Ocean City, Maryland.

== Honors and awards ==
- Asiatic-Pacific Campaign Medal with four battle stars for World War II service
- World War II Victory Medal
- China Service Medal
- National Defense Service Medal
- Korean Service Medal
- United Nations Korea Medal
