= Surabaya Dock of 14,000 tons =

Floating dry dock in the Dutch East Indies

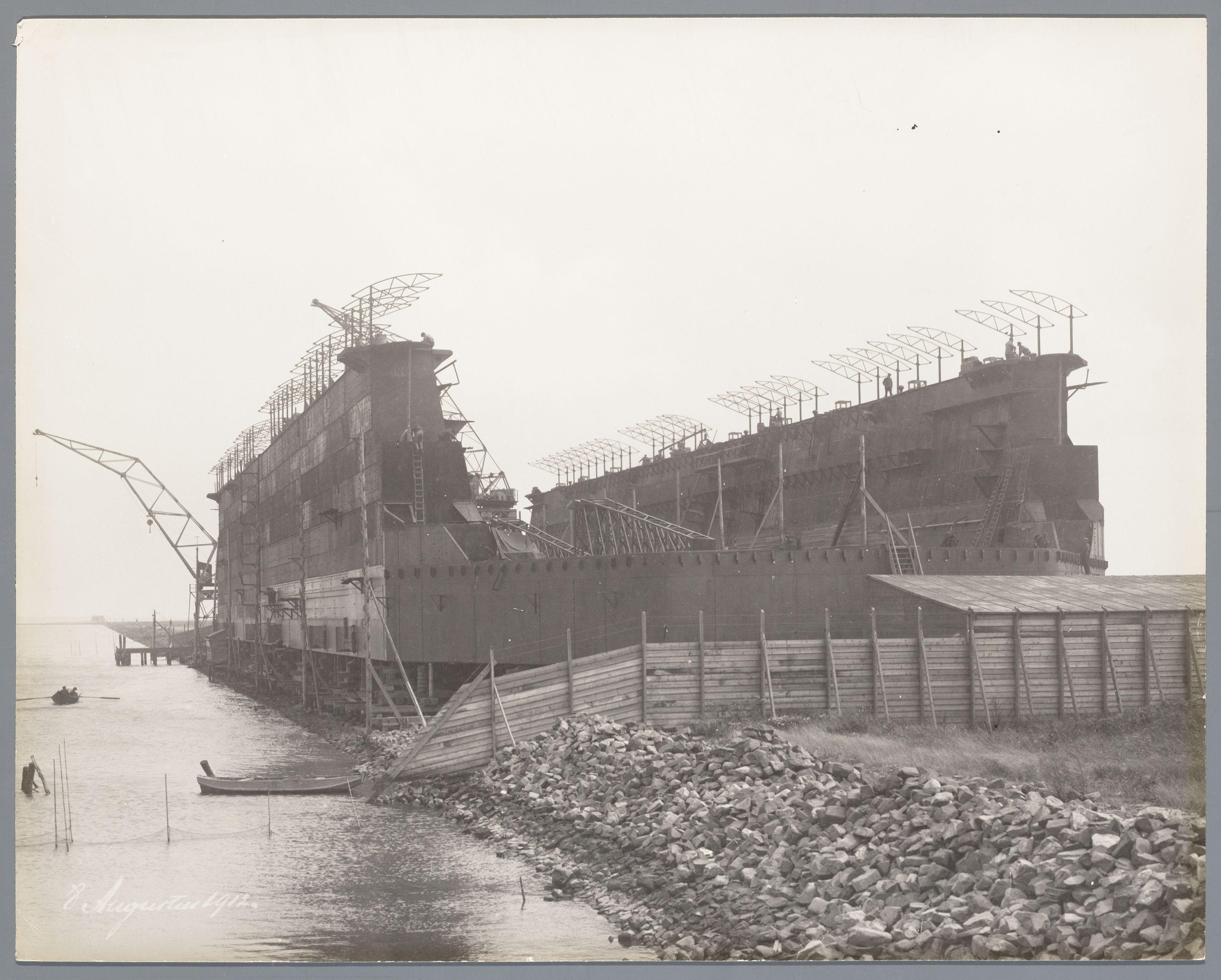
- Surabaya Dock of 14,000 tons under construction at Schellingwoude, 8 August 1912

History

Netherlands
- Name: Surabaya Dock of 14,000 tons
- Ordered: May 1911
- Builder: Nederlandsche Scheepsbouw Maatschappij, Amsterdam
- Yard number: 117
- Launched: 7 June 1913
- Completed: June 1913
- Commissioned: April 1916
- Out of service: Unknown N/A
- Home port: Surabaya, Tanjung Perak; 7.201023°S 112.729993°E

General characteristics (as completed)
- Length: 1913: 459 ft 10 in (140.2 m); 1937: 550 ft 10 in (167.9 m)
- Beam: 115 ft 0.625 in (35.1 m)
- Draft: 24 ft 7.5 in (7.5 m)
- Depth of hold: 15 ft 3.625 in (4.7 m)

The Surabaya Dock of 14,000 tons was a floating dry dock which served in the Dutch East Indies and Indonesia from 1916 until the late 1950s.

== Context ==
=== A large floating dry dock for the Dutch East Indies ===
In 1900, there were three floating dry docks in the Dutch East Indies. The biggest was Onrust Dock of 5,000 tons, stationed at Surabaya. A relatively new dry dock at the time was Tanjung Priok Dock of 4,000 tons at Tanjung Priok, Batavia. The old Onrust Dock of 3,000 tons was stationed at Sabang at the western extremity of the archipelago. The two dry docks on Java could service most ships visiting the island. They were capable of lifting all ships that the Dutch navy had, and it was thought that they would also be able to lift those which the navy would acquire in the foreseeable future.

The Onrust Dock of 5,000 tons had been commissioned and stationed at Onrust Island in 1880. In 1883, the dock lifted HNLMS Koning der Nederlanden of 5,400 tons displacement. In September 1884 Koning der Nederlanden was again reported in the dock. Soon after, the dock lifted the Russian armored cruisers Vladimir Monomakh of 5,683 tons, and, after unloading, Minin of 6,234 tons. It had been proven that Onrust Dock of 5,000 tons could handle all Dutch warships and even some bigger ships. In 1886 the dry dock was rebased to Surabaya.

When, in 1903, the new HNLMS Koningin Regentes of 5,002 tons displacement arrived, Onrust Dock of 5,000 tons proved unable to lift the ship. Although it was known that the official capacity of the dry dock had gone back from 4,800 tons to 4,500 tons, in view of the above this was still a surprising event. Meanwhile, there were plans for a new dry dock of 7,000 tons. After consultations between the ministries for the navy and the colonies, a commission for dry dock facilities in the Indies was appointed in January 1904. Members where: the retired VA N. Mac Leod, the retired chief engineer Siebers of the Marine establishment in Surabaya, Mr. W. Fenenga of the Amsterdamsche Droogdok Maatschappij, Navy shipbuilding engineer Van Veen, and as secretary Lieutenant Schoonhoven. This commission made a report in late 1904. In December 1904, a Dutch M.P. asked the minister for the navy about a new dry dock for Surabaya. He stated the cost of docking in Singapore, and the need for independence in this respect, but nothing much happened.

In 1903, the Droogdok Maatschappij Tandjong Priok in Batavia was extremely busy. Its commercial Tanjung Priok Dock of 4,000 tons had so much work, that some of the maintenance had to be postponed. In 1905 the company got permission to erect a patent slip that could serve vessels of up to 2,000 tons displacement, which was big enough for most vessels which regularly docked at Batavia.

=== The port of Port of Tanjung Perak in Surabaya ===
Surabaya was the commercial center of Java, with good connections to the interior. In the nineteenth century, this had led to the establishment of the main Dutch navy base of the Dutch East Indies at Surabaya. Meanwhile, the harbor of Surabaya was nothing more than a place to safely anchor offshore. This meant that goods had to be transloaded to ships via boats, considerably raising the cost of calling at Surabaya. In about 1909, the Dutch government therefore started the construction of a modern port known as the Port of Tanjung Perak (Dutch: Tandjong Perak). On 22 September 1910. the Droogdok Maatschappij Soerabaja (DMS) was established to manage a dry dock facility at Surabaya. It ordered Surabaya Dock of 3,500 tons, which would arrive in 1912.

=== A large dual-use dry dock ===
On 1 January 1910, Onrust Dock of 5,000 tons was still the largest dry dock in the Dutch East Indies. Under normal circumstances, it would not be large enough to lift the armored cruiser HNLMS De Zeven Provinciën, which had been launched on 15 March 1909. However, as De Zeven Provinciën displaced 6,530 tons, being too large for Onrust Dock of 5,000 tons, did not mean that she required a dry dock of 14,000 tons, i.e. more than twice the size required to lift her. There had been ideas to acquire ships that were slightly larger, but these did not even make it to the design phase. Later plans for battleships would have led to ships which would have been too wide and high for the 14,000 tons dry dock.

In effect the explanation for the size of the dry dock is straightforward. In June 1910, the 473 feet (144 m)-long ocean liner Prinses Juliana of 8,085 GRT, and 12,190 ton displacement was launched. She was the biggest ship built in the Netherlands up to then. She was also a ship of the Netherland Line, the main shipping line between the Netherlands and the Dutch East Indies. She was soon followed by a sister ship, Koningin der Nederlanden. The Dutch government could not ignore the appearance of these large ships. If these ships could not rely on a suitable repair facility in the Dutch East Indies, their owners might prefer to use the alternative in Singapore.

In summary: Surabaya Dock of 14,000 tons was a dry dock meant for use by the navy and merchant shipping. In the end the size of commercial ships was decisive for the size of the new Surabaya dry dock. That it became so large was caused by the plans becoming mixed up with those for the port of Surabaya. In 1903, the new dry dock would become a 7,000 tons dry dock. In 1907 there was talk about dredging the approaches to Surabaya, and the capacity of the dry dock having to become larger than was previously thought. In November 1910, the Minister for the Colonies Jan Hendrik de Waal Malefijt presented a design for a dry dock of 120 m long and 12,000 tons lift capacity, but by then M.P.'s wanted a larger dock, because the ships of the Nederland Line and others were larger (see Prinses Juliana above).

In December 1910, Minister de Waal Malefijt then appointed a commission that was to decide on the type and size of the dry dock. The East Indies would meanwhile have to make plans for the mooring place (Navy base or new port of Surabaya) and the management of the dry dock. If the commission would advice something much more expensive than was envisioned up to then, the minister would get back to the House of Representatives. The commission consisted of: Mr. de Jongh, ex-director of the Public works of Rotterdam (chair); jhr Op ten Noort, member of the board of the Nederland Line; D. Goekoop, chairman of the society of the Dutch shipbuilding industry; Mr. Kloos, chief engineer of Nederlandsche Fabriek van Werktuigen en Spoorwegmaterieel; Fenenga, manager of Amsterdamsche Droogdok Maatschappij; Mr. C. Nobel, manager of Rotterdam Public Works, and future manager of Tanjung Perak; Lt-Captain Umbgrove; and Mr. van Beek, chief-engineer and director of navy ship construction. Meanwhile 500,000 guilders for the dry dock were put on the 1911 budget for the Dutch East Indies.

== Construction and characteristics ==
=== Ordering and construction ===
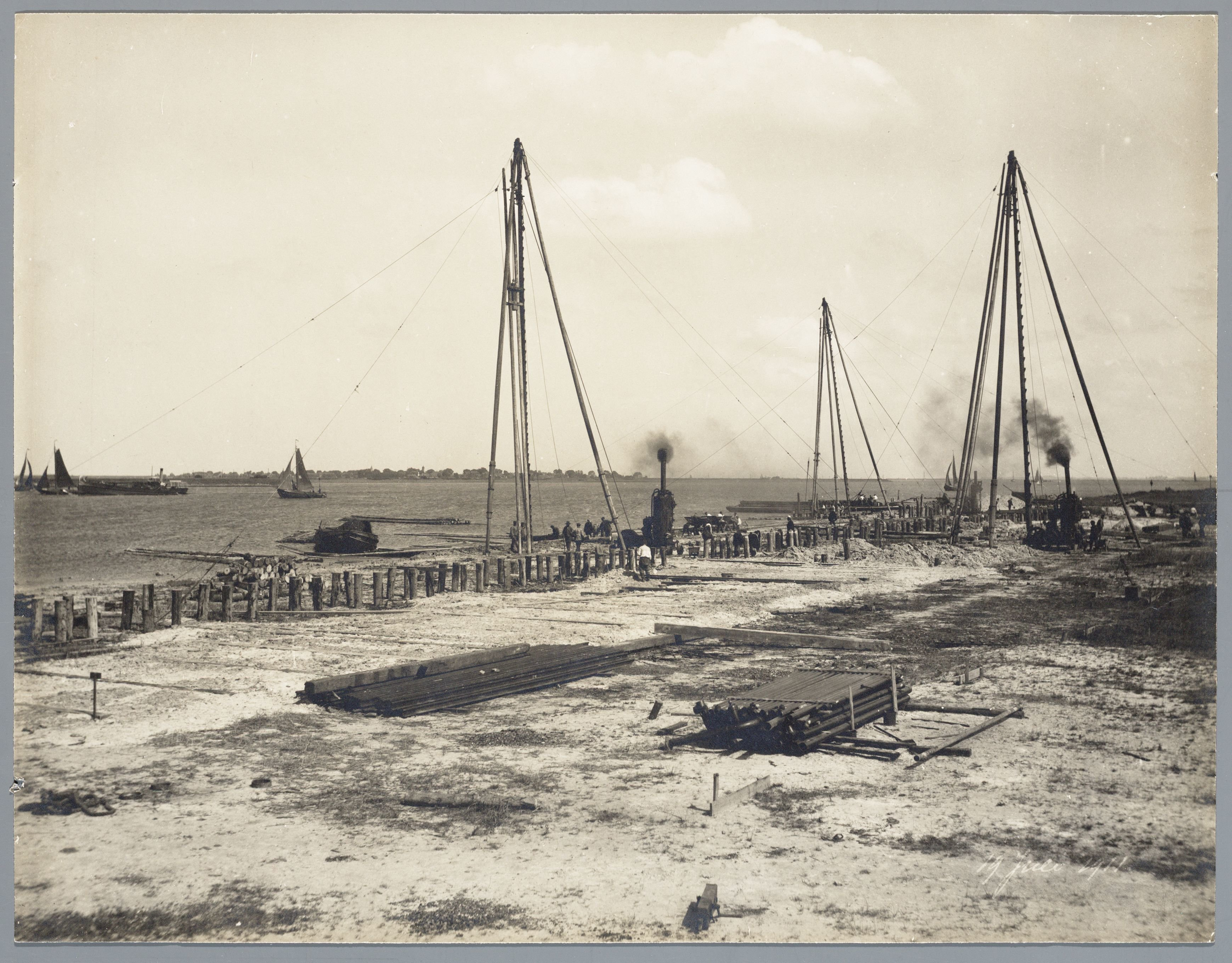
Schellingwoude slipway under construction in July 1911

The overall design and construction of Surabaya Dock of 14,000 tons was led by W. Fenenga. In May 1911, construction was tendered on behalf of the Ministry of the Colonies. It was to be a self-docking dry dock of the 'bolted sectional' type. The three sections of almost equal length were to be joined on the whole profile of the dock. Length was to be 140 m, width on the inside 25 m, width on the outside 35 m. The sides above the water were to be 116 m long. These were high 10 m above the pontoon deck, 4.5 m wide on the pontoon deck, and 2.8 m wide at the top. The pontoons had a depth of hold of 4.6 m in the center. The dry dock would be powered by electricity. It should be able to lift a ship of 14,000 ton displacement and 7.5 m draft in four hours. It would be delivered and tried where built, and be towed to Surabaya. Delivery date would be in June 1912. The tender was won by the Nederlandsche Scheepsbouw Maatschappij in Amsterdam.

The NSM had recently proven her capabilities with regard to dry dock construction by building Juliana Drydock of 12,000 tons. Juliana Dock had been built at a special construction site on the northern shore of the IJ. With her dimensions, she would not have been able to reach the IJ from NSM's shipyard, because the Oosterdok Lock was too narrow. As she was made for the Amsterdamsche Droogdok Maatschappij, her dimensions did not matter with regard to reaching open sea. She would be used in the direct vicinity. Using the same construction site for Surabaya Dock of 14,000 tons was not possible. In order to reach open sea, she would then have to pass either the Oranje Locks of 17.5 m width, or the 25 m wide Middle Lock of the IJmuiden Locks.

The only alternative to transport such a wide dry dock from Amsterdam to the North Sea, was to tow it over the Zuiderzee. A special construction site was therefore built near Schellingwoude on the Blauwe Zand, east of the Oranje Locks. Before construction could begin, 1,200 piles were driven into the ground as a foundation to support the huge weight of the dry dock, and that of the cranes and machines needed for construction. A steam engine with dynamo was set up to provide power to the site for lighting and driving tools. A high-pressure steam compressor was brought in for pneumatic drilling and riveting, a low pressure steam compressor was brought in for abrasive blasting. Two big gantry cranes were erected, as well as temporary buildings for storage, lunchroom etc.

=== Characteristics ===
Surabaya Dock of 14,000 tons was of the 'bolted sectional' type, and made of Siemens Martin steel. Its three sections could be taken apart, so one section could be lifted by the other two for maintenance. The sections were solidly connected with bolts, rivets and rubber linings. This was done at extra reinforced connection compartments. It made self docking a tedious procedure, which made the dry dock unavailable for quite some time.

The bolted sectional type was an improvement over the previous pontoon dock, e.g. Tanjung Priok Dock of 4,000 tons, which had sides in one piece. The pontoon dock was self-docking, because pontoons could be taken out from under it for maintenance, while they were replaced by others. This gave practically no down time for the dock. The bolted sectional type had more rigidity, with the advantage of lifting ships more evenly.

Another maintenance aspect was the use of bituminous enamel coating, which had also been applied to Surabaya Dock of 3,500 tons. It was used up till the waterline on the outside, and overall on the inside, and protected the dry dock against corrosion. The coating was supplied by William Briggs & Sons Ltd. from Dundee, Scotland. During the first self docking in 1921 the coating was proven to be very effective. There was little biofouling on the hull. Most of it was seaweed that was easily removed. In between the seaweed, many mussels had attached themselves to the hull. In places where the coating had been damaged, by sunlight or concussion, these mussels had caused rather deep pits in the hull. There were about 400-500 pits on each section. These were closed by welding. There was no need to replace plates.

The dry dock was 459 ft 10 in (140.2 m) long. Beam was 115 ft 0.625 in (35.1 m) The sides were 15 ft 0.6875 in (4.6 m) wide on the pontoon level, and 9 ft 0.5 in (2.8 m) wide on top. The depth of hold of the pontoon ranged from 13 ft 3.625 in (4.1 m) on the sides to 15 ft 3.625 in (4.7 m) in the center. The total height on the sides was 46 ft 3.625 in (14.1 m). Maximum draft was 24 ft 7.5 in (7.5 m) At the time. Dutch shipbuilders often used English feet for measurements.

Each of the three pontoons was divided by three lateral bulkheads. The total connected pontoon also had eight traverse bulkheads in addition to the two sectional endings. This way the pontoon was divided in 4 times 11 (44 total) watertight compartments. The main frames were positioned 10 ft 0 in (3.0 m) apart. In between, there were lighter frames placed 2 ft 6 in (0.8 m) apart. The pontoon had extra reinforcements below the blocks, and where the other sections of the dock would be during self-docking.

The pumps had to be able to lift the loaded dry dock in four hours. There was one main centrifugal pump of 20 in (0.5 m) diameter in each section, placed as low as possible. Each was driven by a 140 hp electric motor with vertical shaft. These motors were placed in teak houses on top of the dry dock's sides. Each section also had a small centrifugal pump, which served as a bilge pump, and was driven the same way. Electricity would be provided from shore.

The dry dock was controlled from a central operating room, from whence the pumps, valves, and gate valves could be operated. One table had the controls for electric-pneumatic operation of the gate valves of the 44 water tight compartments. A second table had 48 pneumatically driven sight glasses, which showed the water level in each of these compartments, and the water level outside the four sides of the dry dock. The operating room had a telephone connection to the motor houses.

For construction of specialist parts NSM had subcontracted with other manufacturers: With Louis Smulders & Co. from Utrecht for the pumps; With Electrotechnische Industrie v/h Willem Smit & Co. in Slikkerveer for the electric motors; With Firma Groeneveld, van der Poll & Co. from Amsterdam for the electrical installation; With Haarlemsche Machinefabriek v/h Gebroeders Figee for the (electrically powered) capstans; and with Firma H. Olland from Utrecht for the control tables and sight glasses.

== Launch and voyage to Surabaya ==
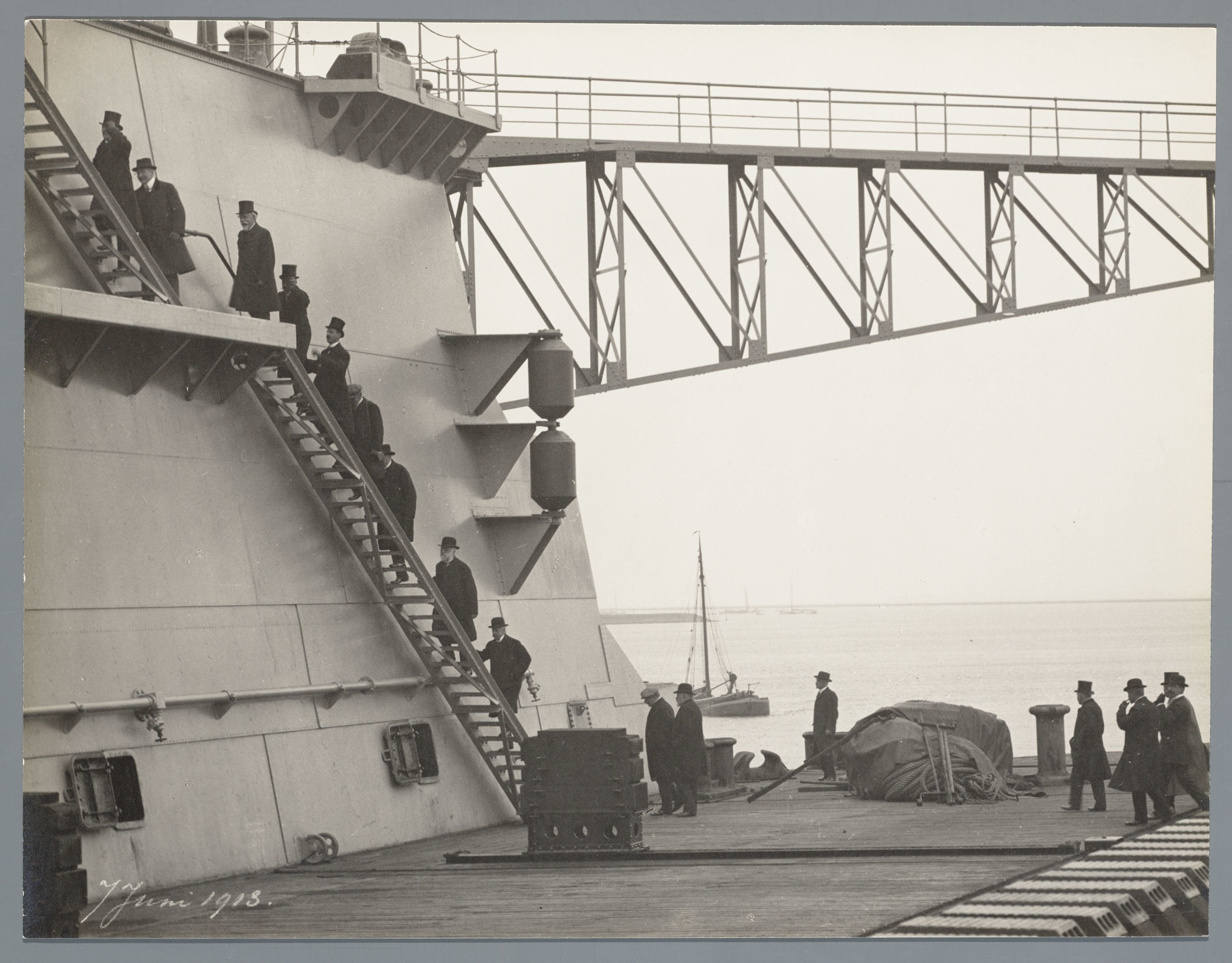
Dignitaries visit in the morning before launch.

Surabaya Dock of 14,000 tons was launched on 7 June 1913. The time was set at 2 PM in order to launch at high tide. The launch was a momentous occasion. At 11 AM the saloon motor boat Alkmaar left the De Ruijter Quay (southern bank of the IJ near Centraal Station) with a number of high-ranking guests, including the Minister for the Colonies J.H. de Waal Malefijt; the Minister for Waterstaat L.R.H. Regout; J.G. Staal and L.A. Salverda de Grave, the secretaries general of both departments; De Jongh and Kloos of the advisory commission; J.T. Cremer, president, and L.P.D. op ten Noord, and J.C. Jansen all three members of the supervisory board of NSM; D. Goedkoop, CEO of NSM, and H. Goekoop, vice president of NSM. The guests were shown around, and climbed the stairs on one of the sides.

After arriving back on the southern shore, they found some other people wanting to see the launch, and so Alkmaar turned back to the site. At 14:30 the dry dock was launched by turning on some hydraulic presses. On the sides was the text Gouvernements Droogdok Soerabaja. After the launch, J.T. Cremer and the ministers made a speech on board.

=== Voyage to Surabaya ===
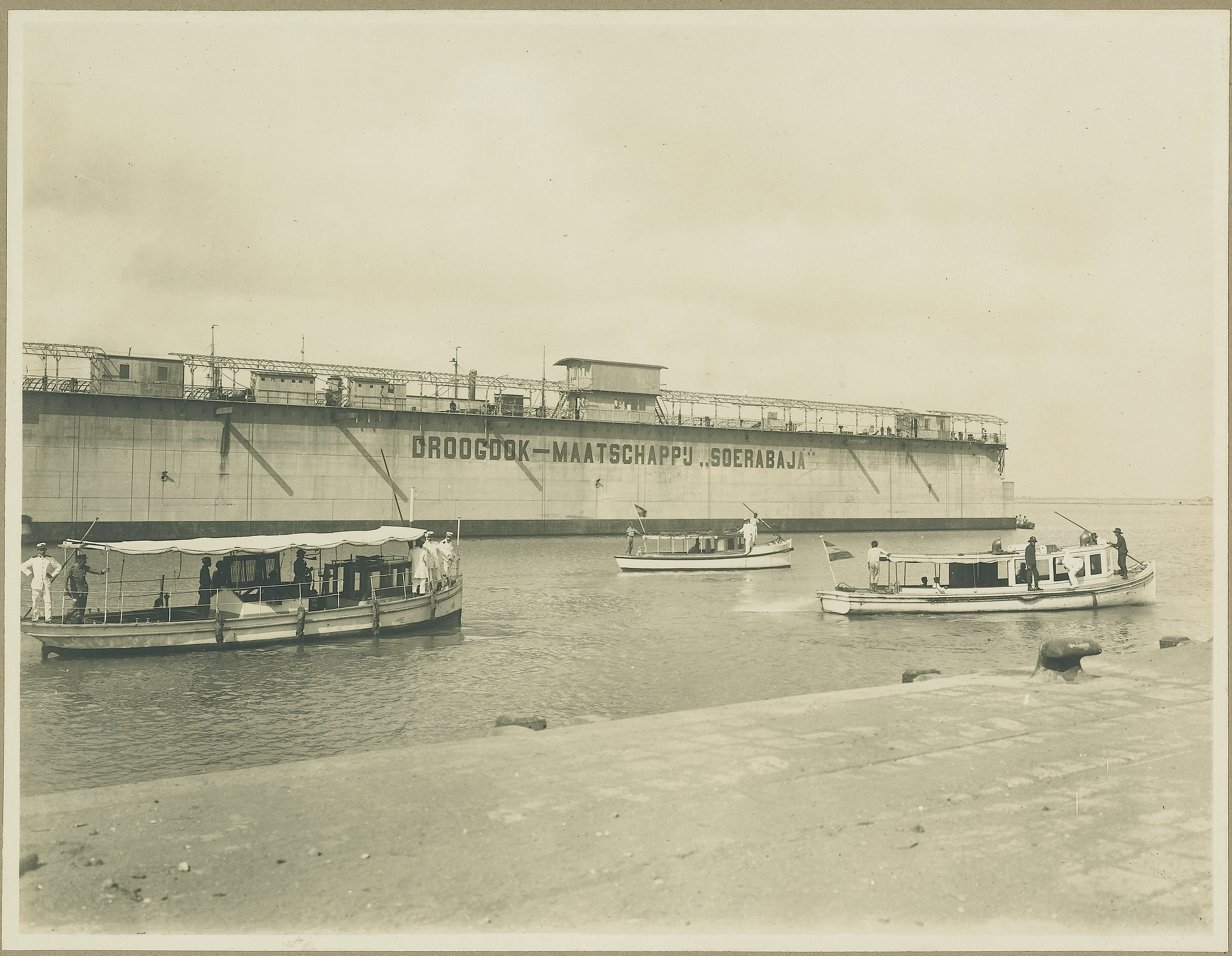
Surabaya Dock of 14,000 tons in Surabaya c. 1924

On Saturday 21 June at 4 PM, tugboats started to tow Surabaya Dock of 14,000 tons over the Zuiderzee towards Nieuwediep. On Monday at 2:30 AM, she arrived in the Texel Roadstead. The transport of the dry dock to Surabaya had been confided to the tow service Zur Muhlen en De Graaf, which had prepared its strongest tugs. The ocean-going tug Atlas measured 519 ton and had 1,500 IHP. She was commanded by Captain J. Bakker and had 18 crew. The ocean-going tug Titan measured 352 ton and had 1,000 IHP. She was commanded by Captain C. Spanjer and had 16 crew. The dock itself was commanded by Captain K. Lieuwen and had 17 crew. The tug Simson would accompany the convoy till the end of the English Channel.

The 'Manilla hawsers' on board the tugs were 17.5 in (0.4 m) thick. The tugs also had pumps, diving equipment, and electrical search lights. Atlas had wireless telegraphy. On the dry dock itself, many parts had been temporarily reinforced. There were also anchors, anchor windlasses, lifeboats etc. For the dry dock crew there was a temporary deck house. There was also a temporary steam engine on board for generating electricity, made by Louis Smulders & Co. from Utrecht. This way the dry dock could be operated during the voyage, which would at least be handy for the bilge pumps.

At 11 AM on 23 June, the tugs were put before the dry dock. The armored cruiser HNLMS Jacob van Heemskerck and some smaller navy vessels came out to wish the dry dock a good voyage. At 12 AM the tugs started to tow with a speed of 4 knots. Once at sea, the hawsers were lengthened to 300 meters, and Simson joined the effort. The tug Hercules with some officials joined the convoy till it reached Callantsoog at 2:40 PM. The plan was to make 80 miles a day. Bunkering had been planned at Algiers, Malta, Port Said, Aden, Colombo and Sabang. In Aden, the convoy would also wait for the end of the monsoon.

On 25 June, the convoy passed Dover. On 26 June at noon, it was south of the Isle of Wight. On the afternoon of the 27th, it was 20 miles southeast of Start Point, Devon. On the morning of the 28th, it was ten miles south of Lizard Point, Cornwall. Simson then turned about, and Surabaya Dock of 14,000 tons was henceforward only pulled by Atlas and Titan. On 10 July, the convoy was at 36°25′0″N 7°20′0″W (near Cadiz). On 11 July, the convoy passed Gibraltar. On 16 July, Titan entered Algiers to load coal. On 22 July, the convoy was at 37°40′0″N 10°16′0″E, north of Tunis. On 31 July, the convoy was at 33°25′0″N 25°8′0″E, south of Crete. On 5 August, the convoy arrived at Port Said.

Passing through the Suez Canal proved relatively easy, but it was still 13 August when the convoy left from Suez. A sand storm that hit the convoy in the Red Sea was probably the most dangerous event of the trip. On the 27th, the convoy passed Perim in the Strait of Mandeb, and entered the Gulf of Aden. On 29 August, it reached Aden. Here it had to wait at open sea for two days, because the weather made the trip into the harbor too dangerous. In Aden, the convoy waited for the monsoon to pass, diminishing the chances for bad weather in the Indian Ocean. The Times of India summarized the progress so far. Average speed had been 3.5 knots. The largest distance covered in one day was 110 miles. Near Cape St. Vincent progress had been slow, covering only 36 miles in 24 hours. Passing the Suez Canal had been easier than expected, even though engine trouble made that the dry dock hit one of the shores of the canal.

The convoy left Aden on 18 September. Near Socotra coal was transferred from the dry dock to Titan. On 9 October, Atlas sent a telegram via the steamers Teheran and Colombo, stating the convoy to be at 9°8′0″N 67°36′0″E. On 17 October, the dry dock, towed by Atlas alone arrived at Colombo. Titan had steamed ahead, to bunker before their arrival. This allowed the convoy to leave on 18 October. On 1 November, the convoy reached Sabang, the first port in the Dutch East Indies. Here Atlas arrived alone in order to bunker ahead of the others. After bunkering the convoy continued its trip on the same day. On 10 November, the convoy passed the Straits of Durian. On Friday 21 November, the convoy reached Surabaya. At 6 AM, the convoy approached the basin. Atlas was towing the dry dock, and Titan was behind her to keep her on course. At 8 AM it had been bought into the new Torpedo Boat Harbor.

== Service ==
=== Delayed commissioning ===
The original plan was that the new harbor of Surabaya would be ready in 1913, but that did not happen. For the Droogdok Maatschappij Soerabaja (DMS), the delays meant that in November 1913 one expected the port, and specifically the location for the DSM, to be completed two years later than planned. Therefore, the dry dock company did not send the equipment for the planned repair shipyard with about 60 machines to Surabaya. DMS already had the smaller Surabaya Dock of 3,500 tons, which it owned. This was anchored offshore, instead of in the unfinished harbor.

DMS had negotiated with the state to lease Surabaya Dock of 14,000 tons, but there was no effective contract when the dock arrived in Surabaya. Without assurance of a suitable location, DMS was probably also not that eager to come to a final contract. Therefore, the navy would take the dry dock into conservation for the time being. On the other hand, this was not good for DMS, because there was a fear that the navy would not let go of the dock if it was successful in commercial operation.

After World War I started in July 1914, there was a strong demand for dry dock capacity in the Dutch East Indies. By November 1914, the East Indies government had proposed that the minister for the colonies make a second attempt to come to an agreement with DMS. It also proposed that in case of failure to come to an agreement, the navy should operate the dock. The government then ordered the navy to take the 14,000 tons dock into use. Therefore, Onrust Dock of 5,000 tons was moved to a different location. Her old location was then deepened to 15 m. The Hollandsche Aannemings Maatschappij, which also built the new port, accepted the job. In little over a week, a big dredging vessel removed 40–45,000 ^{3} of ground.

In early January 1915, Surabaya Dock of 14,000 tons was towed and fixed into position, and a test was done to submerge its deck. However, it seems that the navy did not use the dock, which was not in a suitable location for merchant shipping. Whatever the motives, the move might have put pressure on DMS. By October 1915 there was news about new negotiations between the East Indies government and DMS in order to lease the dry dock and to move it to the new port. In late November 1915, the Minister for the Colonies and DMS came to a final agreement to lease Surabaya Dock of 14,000 tons

=== Regular service ===
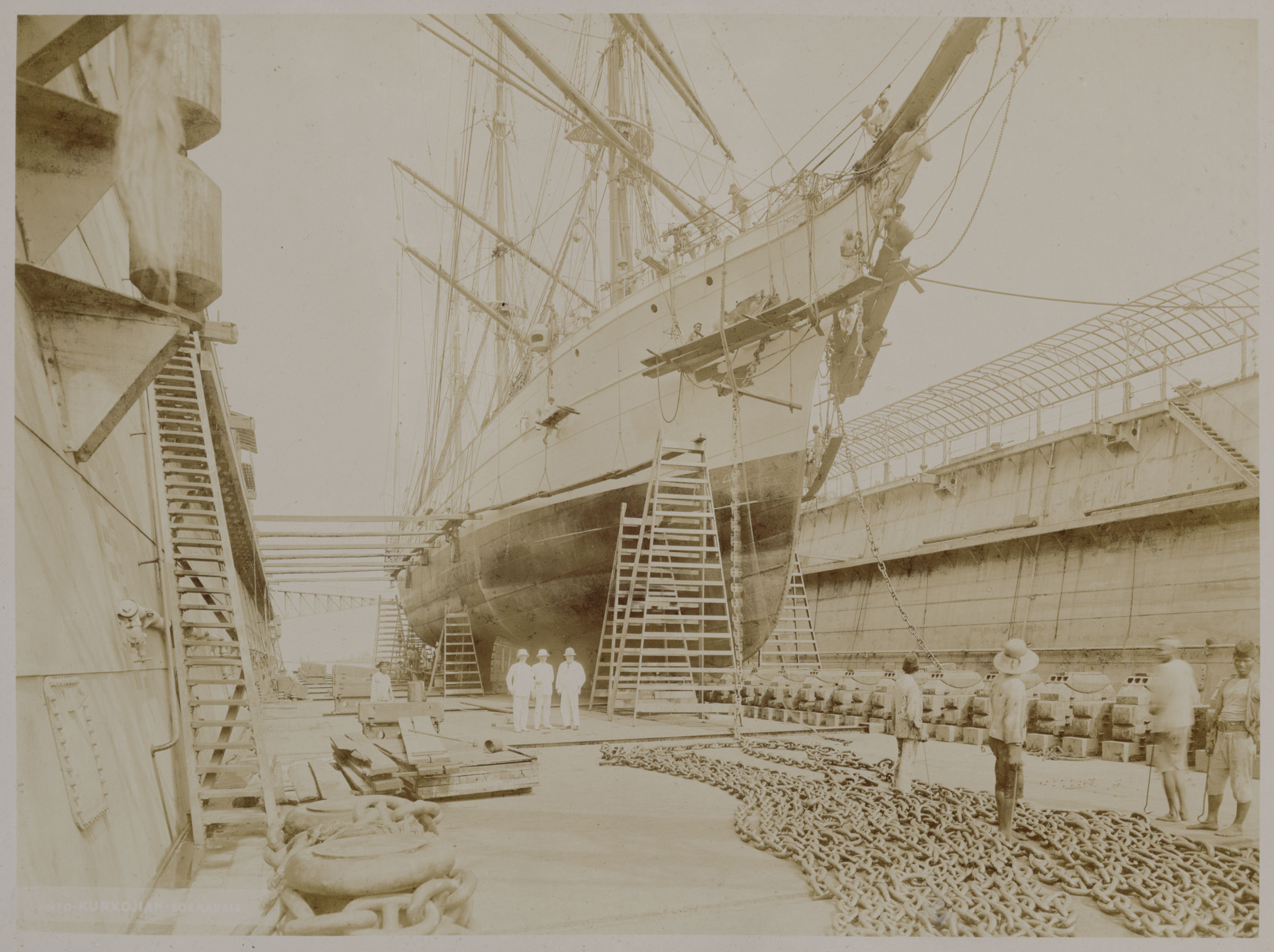
Barque John Davie on the dock 1916-1917

On 13 March 1916, the workplaces of the drydock company DMS became operational. On 29 March 1916, Surabaya Dock of 14,000 tons was towed into the new port. March 1916 was also the month that the 3,500 tons dock was brought into the new port. By 15 April 1916 the 14,000 tons dry dock had lifted Arakan of 5,106 GRT. Other ships followed, but even in 1917 the dock was not yet in its designated place, because the government had not yet placed the required dolphins. In 1917, the dry dock was nevertheless quite busy with 96 ships using the dock in 89 dockings (i.e. multiple ships in one go) for 283 days.

In 1916–1917, DMS got a remarkable assignment. For the Van Meel shipping line, it was to revise three old sailings ships, which were to sail to Europe around the cape with tobacco. These were: Albertina Beatrice, John Davie, and Nest. There is a picture of the barque Nest on board the smaller dry dock, see Surabaya Dock of 3,500 tons. Another picture has a ship of this shipping line with a male figurehead and visible bow on the deck of Surabaya Dock of 14,000 tons. From a picture, the ship on the dock is shown to be the John Davie.

In 1918, Surabaya Dock of 14,000 tons lifted Surabaya Dock of 3,500 tons for 22 days, so she could be repaired. That year Surabaya Dock of 14,000 tons serviced 82 ships in docking operations which lasted 344 days. In 1919, the dock was busy for 97 ships in 83 dockings for 295 days. In 1920, this was 121 ships in 95 dockings which lasted for 329 days.

In 1920, the terrain where DMS would finally establish its 99.5 by 39.5 m hall was created. In 1921, the two dry docks were joined by Surabaya Dock of 1,400 tons, a smaller dry dock which had been bought in Germany. The years 1921-1925 were rather bad for DMS, and so the docks had little to do. The years 1926-1929 saw a vast expansion of the company. It succeeded in attracting most of the maintenance work for Dutch local shipping companies, which previously preferred to have their maintenance done abroad. Some foreign ships even visited Surabaya just for docking, something unimaginable before WW I.

=== First self docking ===
The original plan was that the first self-docking of Surabaya Dock of 14,000 tons would take place after 5 years in the Dutch East Indies. Due to several circumstances, including the war, this was delayed till May 1921. More than 10 days passed before the three sections were disconnected on 1 June. The challenge was to level this section as exactly as possible in order to prevent them breaking apart forcibly, with risk of severe damage. The three sections were then connected with 0 ft 0.75 in (0.0 m) steel cables, while the outer sections got below the middle section. On 22 June, the docking of the first section started. On 13 July, this docking was finished. On 19 July, the third section was lifted. This was finished on 4 August. On 10 August, the middle section was lifted. This section was finished on 30 August.

While lifting the first section, an eastern wind of 6ft made that the section that was to be lifted acted as a gigantic sail. In the end, it proved complex to get, and keep the sections in the required positions before lifting a section. The worst margin of the three lifts was 20cm in length and 10cm in width. Another challenge was that the lifting sections of course sank deeper under the lifted section. The lifting sections were kept level by pumping out more water from the compartments directly under the lifted section. In summary, the total procedure of lifting a section took between five and nine hours. From 3 to 17 September the sections were bolted together again. On 23 September, the dry dock was towed back to its original location. On 24 September, it was operational again.

=== The Great Depression ===
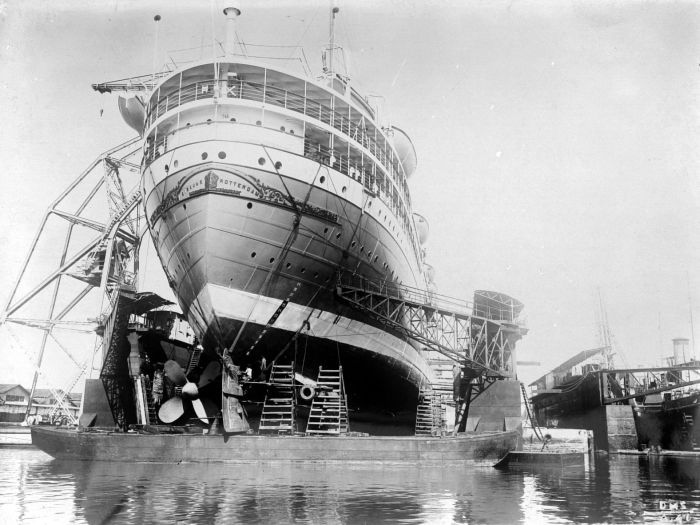
Surabaya dock of 14,000 tons left of the 3,500 tons dock

The Great Depression led to some very depressed years for DMS. In the early years, it especially hit the 3,500 and small 1,400 tons docks of the company. From 1931 to 1935 there was no dividend. Over 1936 only a small dividend of 2.5%. Over 1937 a more normal divided of 5% was paid to the shareholders.

=== Increased lift capacity of 15.500 tons ===
In 1937, Surabaya Dock of 14,000 tons was lengthened from 459 to 550 feet (139.9 to 167.6 m). As a side effect, lift capacity increased from 14,000 tons to 15,500 tons. The lengthening was done by DMS building two small extra dock sections on its own shipyard in Surabaya. The lengthening had everything to do with the Dutch navy commissioning the light cruiser HNLMS De Ruyter in October 1936. This cruiser was 561 feet (170.9 m) long and displaced 7,669 tons. This was substantially longer than the Java-class cruisers of 510 feet (155.3 m) length.

=== World War II ===
World War II was an extremely busy time for all shipyards in allied territory. This was also true for the dry dock company Surabaya, which built a lot of ships, and was engaged in the desperate attempts to build up the defense of the Dutch East Indies. In March 1942, the Dutch attempted to destroy the naval facilities in Surabaya.

=== The late 1940s ===
In March 1947 Surabaya Dock of 14,000 tons was again taken into use.

In 1956 usage of the dry dock was again insufficient.

By 1958 the Indonesian military had taken control of DMS in Indonesia. In September 1959, the dry dock company in Indonesia was officially nationalized by the Indonesian government, with start date 3 December 1957.

== The end ==
After nationalization DMS became PT. Dok & Perkapalan Surabaya (DPS) (In English: PT. Dock and Shipping Surabaya (Persero)). Surabaya Dock of 14,000 tons might have continued in use for decades.
