= Surabaya Dock of 3,500 tons =

Floating dry dock in Indonesia from 1913 to 1956

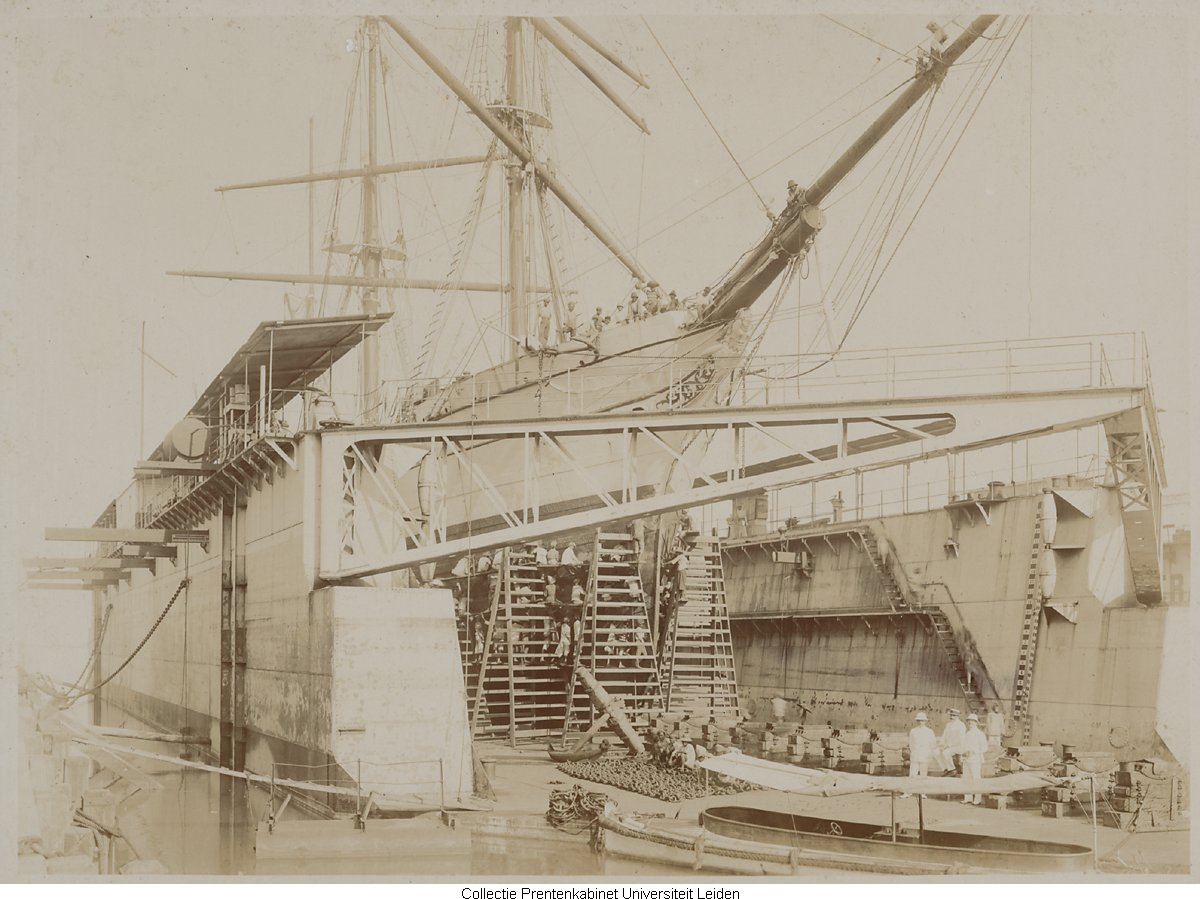
- The barque Nest (1868) on Surabaya Dock of 3,500 tons in May 1917.

History

Netherlands
- Name: Surabaya Dock of 3,500 tons
- Builder: William Hamilton and Company
- Launched: 21 June 1912
- Out of service: ?
- Homeport: Surabaya, Tanjung Perak; 7.201023°S 112.729993°E

General characteristics (as completed)
- Length: 350.00 ft (106.7 m)
- Beam: 85.00 ft (25.9 m)

Surabaya Dock of 3,500 tons was a floating dry dock in Indonesia from about 1913 till about 1956.

== Context ==
On 22 September 1910 Droogdok Maatschappij Soerabaja (DMS) was established by contract. It had a capital of 1,000,000 guilders. CEO was A.C. Zeeman, former chief inspector of shipping in the Dutch East Indies. The supervisory board was formed by W. Fenenga, of Amsterdamsche Droogdok Maatschappij; J. Muysken, of Nederlandsche Fabriek van Werktuigen en Spoorwegmaterieel; J.B.A. Jonckheer of Stoomvaart Maatschappij Nederland; and J.H. Hummel of the Koninklijke Paketvaart-Maatschappij (KPM) and Java-China-Japan Line.

== Construction and characteristics ==
=== Ordering and construction ===
The overall design and construction of Surabaya Dock of 3,500 tons was led by W. Fenenga. It was ordered at William Hamilton and Company. She was launched at Port Glasgow on 21 June 1912 as Soerabaya I. She was next towed to Victoria Harbour in Greenock for trials.

=== Characteristics ===
Surabaya Dock of 3,500 tons was 320 feet long and 80 feet wide. Actual lift capacity was 3,560 tons, and ships with a draught of up to 18 feet could use it. Others have the dock as 350 feet long, with a beam of 85 feet. and a height of 30 feet above the waterline. There is a statement that the lift capacity of 3,500 tons equaled a capacity to lift ships with a displacement of 8,000 tons.

The dock consisted of 18 watertight compartments. Each could be flooded separately. Two electro-engines drove two centrifugal pumps. It was expected that electricity was provided by a power station on shore. Nevertheless, there were two Cochran boilers, which could drive a generator if the drydock would have to be used outside the port.

== Service ==
=== Voyage to Surabaya ===
On 6 July 1912 Surabaya Dock of 3,500 tons left Greenock towed by the ocean tug Thames of Smit International. Inside the dock was a floating crane meant for KPM. On 14 July the convoy was at 47°N 8°W, on 24 July the convoy passed Gibraltar. On 3 August it arrived in Malta, from whence it left on the 5th. On 16 August the convoy arrived in Port Said. On 4 September it passed Perim at the southern exit of the Red Sea, and on 5 September it arrived in Aden. Thames and Surabaya Dock I left Aden on 16 September. On 13 October they arrived in Colombo. On 30 October 1912 the ships arrived in Sabang, Aceh, the first harbor in the Dutch East Indies. On 19 November 1912 they arrived in Surabaya. The voyage of 9,000 sea miles set a distance record for towing a dry dock with one tug. The voyage was interesting enough to be covered in some detail.

=== Service offshore ===
The original plan was that the new harbor of Surabaya would be ready in 1913, but that did not happen. Therefore, the dry dock company did not send the machines for the planned repair shipyard (estimated at 250,000 guilders) to Surabaya. Surabaya Dock of 3,500 tons was anchored offshore, instead of in the new harbor.

=== Regular service ===
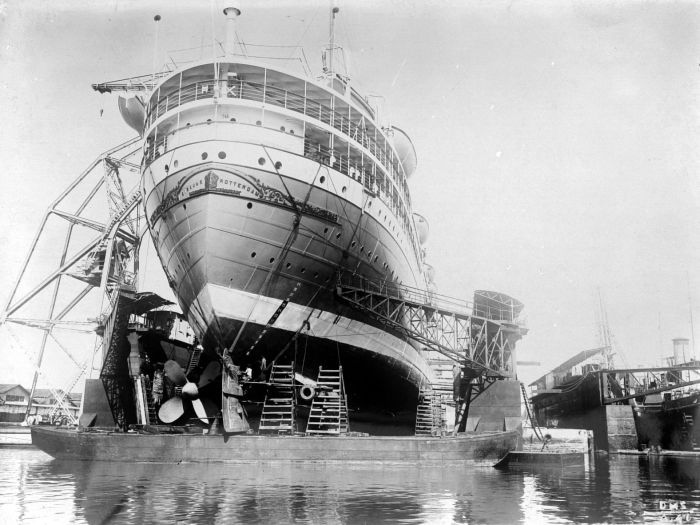
Surabaya dock of 3,500 tons right of the 14,000 tons dock

On 13 March 1916 the workplaces of the drydock company became operational. March 1916 was also the month that both the 3,500 tons dock and Surabaya Dock of 14,000 tons were brought into port. It was June (1917?) before the 14,000 dock was brought to its designated place.

In 1917 the dock was not yet in its designated place. It was nevertheless quite busy with 65 ships using the dock in 54 dockings (i.e. multiple ships in one go) for 308 days. In 1918 the dock itself was lifted by the 14,000 tons dock for 22 days to undergo repairs. Surabaya Dock of 3,500 tons service 90 ships for 294 days. In 1919 the dock was busy for 92 ships on 323 days. In 1920 this was 47 ships for 359 days.

The years 1921-1925 were rather bad for DMS, and so the dock had little to do. The years 1926-1929 saw a vast expansion of the company. It succeeded in attracting most of the maintenance work for Dutch local shipping companies, which previously preferred to have their maintenance done abroad. Some foreign ships even visited Surabaya just for docking, something unimaginable before WW I.

The great depression led to some very depressed years for DMS. In the early years it especially hit the 3,500 and 1,400 tons docks of the company. From 1931-1935 there was no dividend. Over 1936 only a small dividend of 2.5%. Over 1937 a more normal divided of 5% was paid to the shareholders.

=== The late 1940s ===
During the whole of 1947 the dry dock was again in use by DMS. In 1948 some major maintenance and repairs on the dock were started. In May 1949 the repairs on Surabaya Dock of 3,500 tons were complete.

In March 1955 Surabaya Dock of 3,500 tons sank. It was expected to be back in operation c. August 1956. In January 1956 it was actually recovered, and in December 1956 it was again ready for service.

By 1958 the Indonesian military had taken control of DMS in Indonesia. In September 1959 the dry dock company in Indonesia was officially nationalized by the Indonesian government, with start date 3 December 1957.
