= C-class motor launch =

Class overview
- Name: C class
- Operators: Royal Netherlands Navy (planned)

General characteristics
- Type: Motor launch
- Displacement: 95 t (93 long tons)
- Length: 32 m (105 ft 0 in)
- Beam: 4.6 m (15 ft 1 in)
- Draft: 1.6 m (5 ft 3 in)
- Propulsion: 2 propellers; 1,000 bhp (750 kW); Diesel engines
- Speed: 18 knots (33 km/h; 21 mph)

The C class was a planned ship class of motor launches to be built in the Dutch East Indies for the Royal Netherlands Navy. However, before the motor launches could be tendered the Dutch East Indies was invaded by the Japanese. As a result no motor launch of the C class was ever constructed.

== Design and construction ==
The C-class motor launches were designed in 1941 in the Dutch East Indies and planned to be tendered at a shipyard in the colony. They were designed to be able to perform various roles such as auxiliary submarine chaser, patrol vessel and auxiliary minesweeper. The launches measured 32 meters (105 ft 0 in) in length, had a beam of 4.6 m (15 ft 1 in) and a draft of 1.6 m (5 ft 3 in). Furthermore, they had a displacement of 95 metric tons (93 long tons) and were equipped with diesel engines that could produce 1,000 brake horsepower (750 kW). This allowed the launches to reach a maximum speed of 18 knots (33 km/h; 21 mph). The launches had two propellers. Their armament had not yet been determined.

Before the C-class motor launches could be tendered the Dutch East Indies was invaded by the Japanese. It is therefore unknown how many C-class motor launches were planned to be built.

== See also ==
- B-class motor launch
