= A-class minesweeper =

Four minesweepers of the Dutch navy

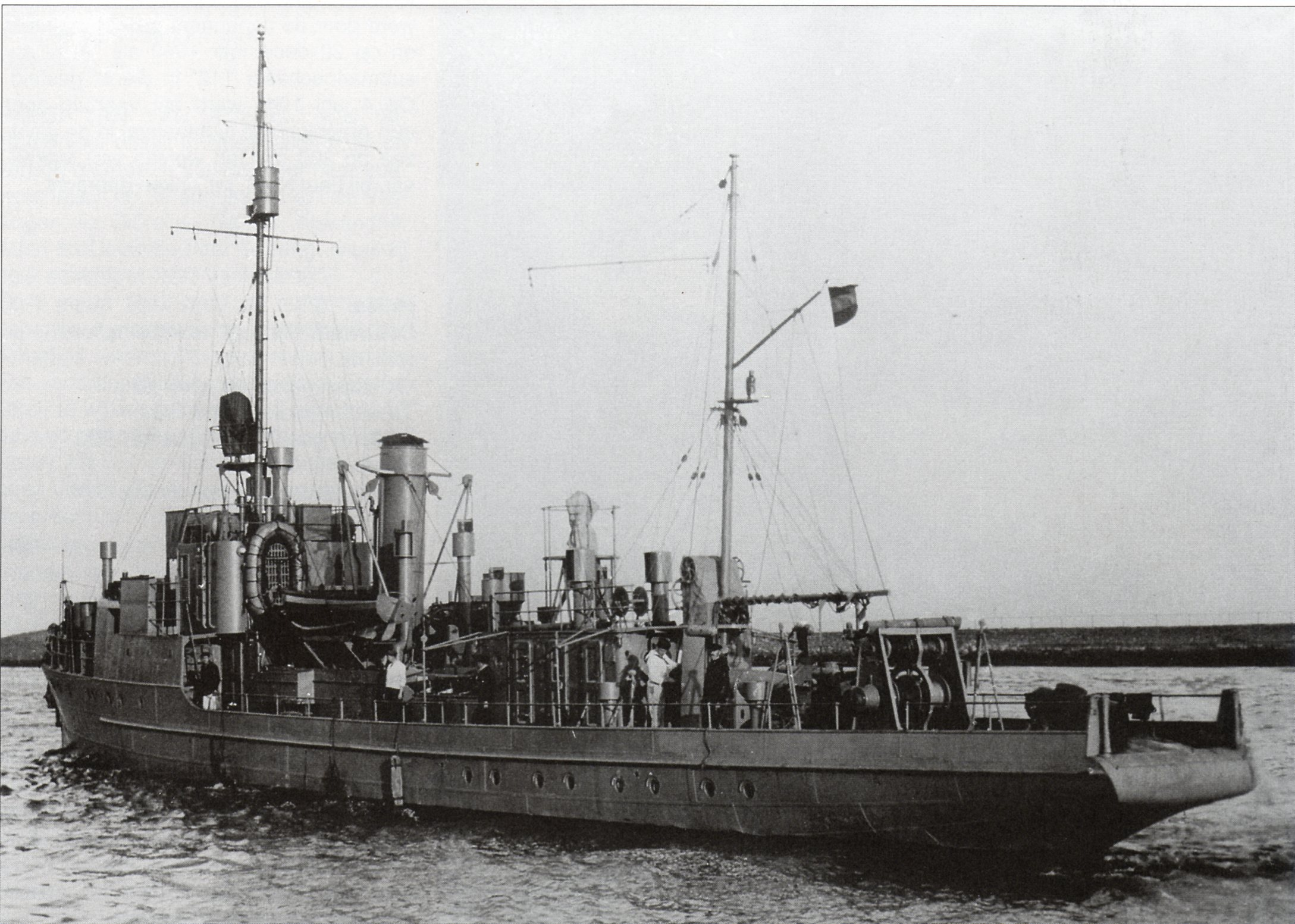
- HNLMS A prior to departure to the Dutch East Indies

Class overview
- Builders: Rijkswerf Willemsoord
- Operators: Royal Netherlands Navy; Imperial Japanese Navy
- Completed: 4
- Laid up: 4

General characteristics
- Type: Minesweeper
- Displacement: 179 long tons (182 t)
- Length: 42.8 m (140 ft 5 in)
- Propulsion: 700 hp (520 kW) engine
- Speed: 13.5–14.5 kn (25.0–26.9 km/h; 15.5–16.7 mph)
- Complement: 31–38
- Armament: 2 × 12.7 mm calibre machine guns

The A class were four minesweepers of the Royal Netherlands Navy. They were the first purpose-built minesweepers of the Dutch Navy, as earlier minesweepers were converted tugboats.

== Design ==
The A class was based on the German FM-type of coastal minesweeper built during the First World War.

== History ==
All ships of the A class were built between 1928 and 1930 at Willemsoord, Den Helder. All four ships were commissioned on 4 August 1930, and two days later, on 6 August 1930, all four sailed to the Dutch East Indies, arriving at Surabaya on 30 October 1930.

During the Japanese invasion of the Dutch East Indies in March 1942 all four ships were scuttled by their crews. Three of the ships, A, B and C, were salvaged and put into service with the Imperial Japanese Navy as auxiliary submarine chasers no. 113, 112 and 116, being rearmed with a single 47 mm gun, three 25 mm cannons, a 13.2 mm machine gun and eight depth charges. All three were sunk by US forces in 1944–1945.

== Ships in class ==
- HNLMS A - Laid down 9/1928. Launched 19 April 1929 and completed on 4 August 1930. Scuttled at Surabaya, Java 1 March 1942, raised by Japan and commissioned as Cha.113 on 17 January 1943. Sunk by US submarine USS Hardhead off Java on 23 June 1945.
- HNLMS B - Laid down 9/1928. Launched 24 September 1929 and completed on 4 August 1930. Scuttled at Surabaya, Java 2 March 1942, raised by Japan, commissioned as Cha.112 on 20 December 1942. Sunk by US aircraft in the Java Sea on 4 June 1945.
- HNLMS C - Laid down 4/1929. Launched late 1929. Completed 4 August 1930. Scuttled at Surabaya, Java 6 March 1942, raised and commissioned as Japanese Cha.116 on 8 April 1943. Sunk by US carrier-based aircraft 20 miles west of Cavite, Luzon on 13 November 1944.
- HNLMS D - Laid down 1928. Launched 1929. Completed 8/1930. Scuttled at Surabaya, Java 2 March 1942 to prevent capture by Japanese forces.

== See also ==
- List of minesweepers of the Royal Netherlands Navy
