= HNLMS A =

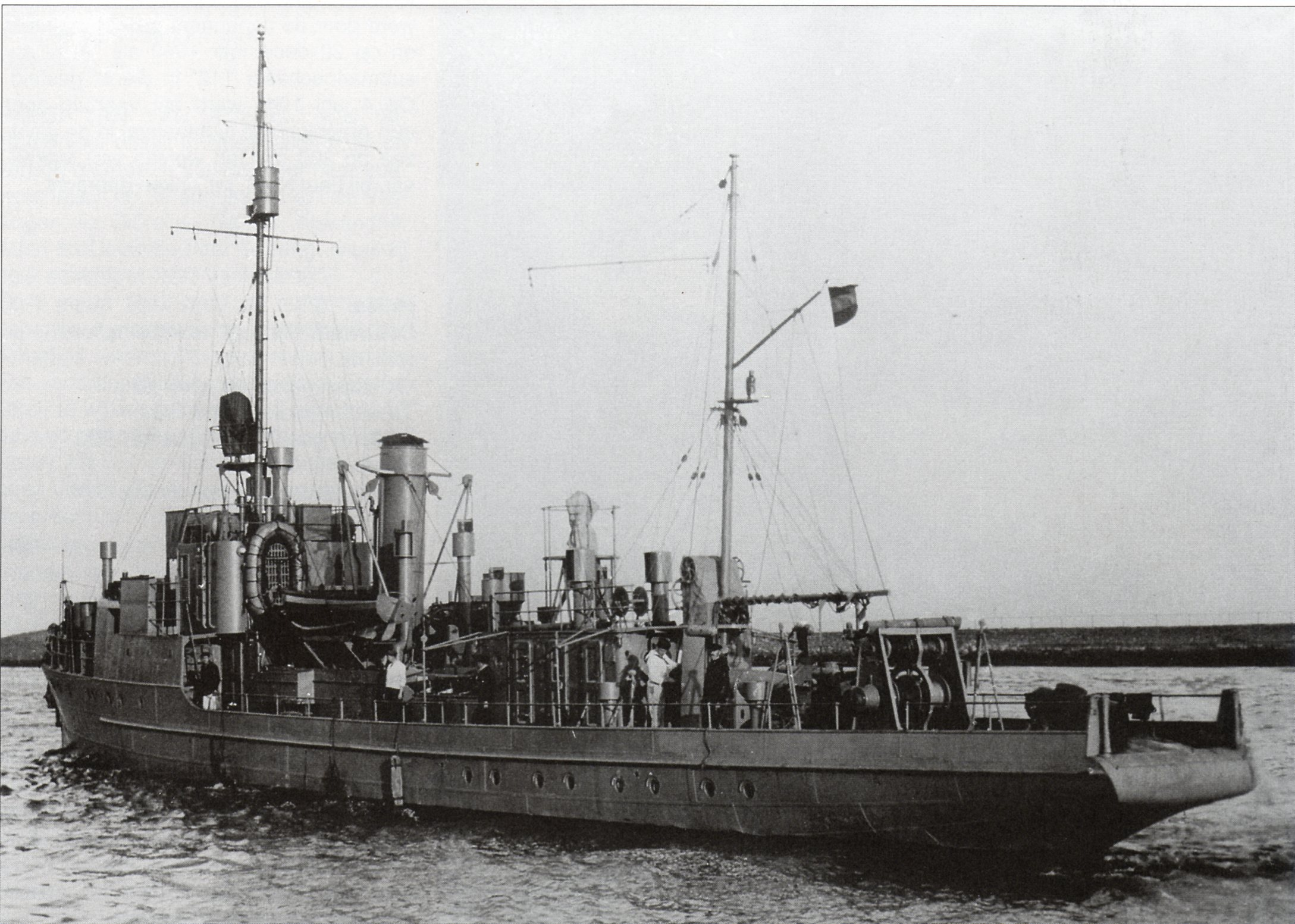
- HNLMS A prior to departure to the Dutch East Indies

History

The Netherlands
- Name: A
- Builder: Royal Shipyard, Willemsoord, Den Helder
- Laid down: 13 September 1928
- Launched: 19 April 1929
- Completed: 4 August 1930
- Fate: Scuttled, 1 March 1942

Empire of Japan
- Name: No. 113
- Acquired: repaired by the Empire of Japan, 1943
- Commissioned: 10 December 1943
- Fate: Sunk by torpedo attack, 23 July 1945

General characteristics
- Class & type: A-class minesweeper
- Displacement: 179 long tons (182 t) standard
- Length: 45 m (147 ft 8 in) overall
- Beam: 5.99 m (19 ft 8 in)
- Draught: 1.49 m (4 ft 11 in)
- Installed power: 690 hp (510 kW)
- Propulsion: 2 triple expansion engines, 2 shafts
- Speed: 14.0 knots (25.9 km/h; 16.1 mph)
- Complement: 38 (Dutch)
- Armament: Dutch: *2 × 12.7 mm Japanese: *1 x 47 mm *3 x 25 mm *1 x 13 mm 8 depth charges

HNLMS A (Dutch: Hr.Ms. A) was an A-class minesweeper of the Royal Netherlands Navy that was scuttled by her crew during the Battle of Java. She was later re-floated and repaired by the Japanese and converted into auxiliary submarine chaser Cha-113 or No. 113 (Japanese: 第百十三號驅潜特務艇).

== History ==
She was ordered by Royal Netherlands Navy and laid down on 13 September 1928 at the Royal Shipyard at Willemsoord, Den Helder, the first of four minesweepers in her class each denominated by a letter (HNLMS B, HNLMS C, HNLMS D). She was launched on 19 April 1929 and completed on 4 August 1930. She arrived at Surabaya on 20 October 1930 towed by the tugboats Friesland and Vlaanderen. On 28 February 1942, she was attacked and damaged by Japanese aircraft at Surabaya. On 1 March 1942, during the Battle of Java, she was scuttled by her crew at Surabaya.

She was raised by the Japanese and converted into auxiliary submarine chaser No. 113. On 10 December 1943, her conversion was completed and she was commissioned into the Imperial Japanese Navy. She was mostly engaged in escort duties around Java. On 23 June 1945 she was torpedoed and sunk by the American submarine USS Hardhead along with shuttle boat No. 8333 northeast of Madura Island and southeast of the Masalembu Islands at coordinates (05°45′S 114°16′E). At the time, Cha-113 was counterattacking Hardhead which had just sunk Cha-42 at 05°44′S 114°16′E.
