= USS Hardhead =

Submarine of the United States

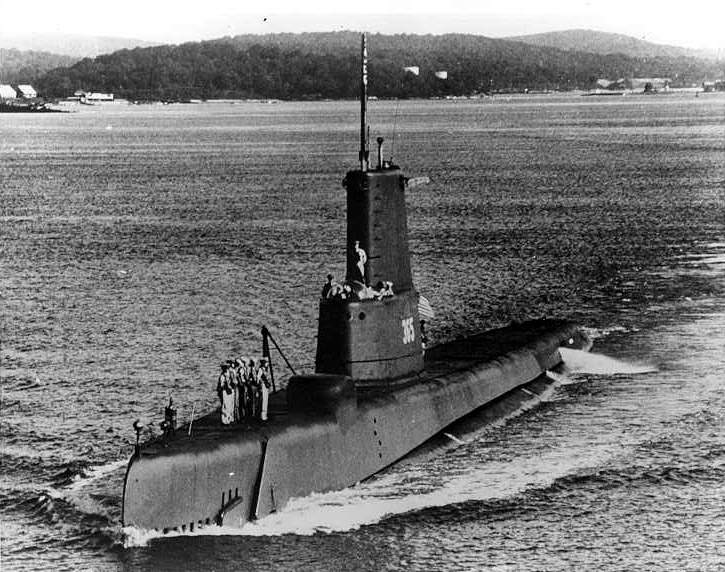
- USS Hardhead (SS-365) sometime after May 1953.

History

United States
- Name: USS Hardhead
- Namesake: Hardhead
- Builder: Manitowoc Shipbuilding Company, Manitowoc, Wisconsin
- Laid down: 7 July 1943
- Launched: 12 December 1943
- Commissioned: 18 April 1944
- Decommissioned: 10 May 1946
- Recommissioned: 6 February 1952
- Decommissioned: 22 May 1952
- Recommissioned: 24 March 1953
- Decommissioned: 26 July 1972
- Stricken: 26 July 1972
- Identification: SS-365
- Fate: Transferred to Greece, 26 July 1972

Greece
- Name: Papanikolis
- Acquired: 26 July 1972
- Stricken: 4 May 1993
- Identification: S-114
- Fate: Sold for scrap 1993

General characteristics
- Class & type: Balao-class diesel-electric submarine
- Displacement: 1,526 tons (1,550 t) surfaced; 2,424 tons (2,463 t) submerged
- Length: 311 ft 9 in (95.02 m)
- Beam: 27 ft 3 in (8.31 m)
- Draft: 16 ft 10 in (5.13 m) maximum
- Propulsion: 4 × Fairbanks-Morse Model 38D8-⅛ 10-cylinder opposed piston diesel engines driving electrical generators; 2 × 126-cell Sargo batteries; 4 × high-speed Elliott electric motors with reduction gears; two propellers; 5,400 shp (4.0 MW) surfaced; 2,740 shp (2.0 MW) submerged
- Speed: 20.25 knots (38 km/h) surfaced; 8.75 knots (16 km/h) submerged
- Range: 11,000 nautical miles (20,000 km) surfaced at 10 knots (19 km/h)
- Endurance: 48 hours at 2 knots (3.7 km/h) submerged; 75 days on patrol
- Test depth: 400 ft (120 m)
- Complement: 10 officers, 70–71 enlisted
- Armament: 10 × 21-inch (533 mm) torpedo tubes; 6 forward, 4 aft; 24 torpedoes; 1 × 5-inch (127 mm) / 25 caliber deck gun; Bofors 40 mm and Oerlikon 20 mm cannon

General characteristics (Guppy IIA)
- Class & type: none
- Displacement: 1,848 tons (1,878 t) surfaced; 2,440 tons (2,479 t) submerged
- Length: 307 ft (93.6 m)
- Beam: 27 ft 4 in (8.3 m)
- Draft: 17 ft (5.2 m)
- Propulsion: Snorkel added; One diesel engine and generator removed; Batteries upgraded to Sargo II
- Speed: Surfaced: 17.0 knots (19.6 mph; 31.5 km/h) maximum; 13.5 knots (15.5 mph; 25.0 km/h) cruising; Submerged: 14.1 knots (16.2 mph; 26.1 km/h) for ½ hour; 8.0 knots (9.2 mph; 14.8 km/h) snorkeling; 3.0 knots (3.5 mph; 5.6 km/h) cruising
- Armament: 10 × 21 inch (533 mm) torpedo tubes; (six forward, four aft); all guns removed

USS Hardhead (SS-365), a Balao-class submarine, was a ship of the United States Navy named for the hardhead, a fish of the croaker family.

== Construction and commissioning ==
Hardhead was launched by the Manitowoc Shipbuilding Company at Manitowoc, Wisconsin on 12 December 1943, sponsored by Mrs. Inez Riddle McDonald, wife of Lieutenant Commander Eugene F. McDonald (Retired), President of Zenith Radio Corporation, and commissioned on 18 April 1944.

== Service history ==
Following shakedown training in Lake Michigan Hardhead entered a floating dry dock at Lockport, Illinois, and was towed to New Orleans, Louisiana, where she arrived on 16 May 1944. She got underway from Algiers, Louisiana, on 22 May1944, and arrived at Balboa, Panama Canal Zone, five days later. There she took part in additional training exercises before her arrival at Pearl Harbor, Hawaii, on 7 July 1944.

=== First war patrol, July – September 1944 ===
Hardhead, departed on her first war patrol 27 July and proceeded to her patrol area off the Philippines. Early 18 August she detected the Japanese cruiser Natori east of San Bernardino Strait, and closed for a surface attack. The first well-directed salvo stopped the cruiser dead in the water; a second sent her to the bottom.

During the remainder of her first patrol Hardhead rendered lifeguard services during strikes by fleet aircraft on the Philippines and operated with a reconnaissance line during the Palaus operation. She arrived Fremantle, Australia, 26 September 1944.

=== Second war patrol, October – December 1944 ===
Hardhead's second patrol began as she departed Fremantle 24 October and set course for the Philippines. While steaming on the surface through the Sulu Sea October she discovered a life raft adrift. In it was Commander Bakutis, commander of a fighter squadron (VF-20) from the aircraft carrier Enterprise, who had been in the water for six days after being shot down during America's victory in the Battle of Leyte Gulf.

Operating in a coordinated group with Growler and Hake, the submarine sighted a large cargo ship with escorts 8 November. After being driven off in one attack, Hardhead aggressively gained an ahead position and sank Manei Maru. It was during this attack that Growler was lost.

Hardhead performed lifeguard duty off Subic Bay in November and on 25 November came upon an escorted merchant ship. She sank a coast defense vessel, damaged the merchantman, and evaded a retaliatory depth charge attack. Soon afterward, the submarine returned to Fremantle, ending another patrol on 5 December.

=== Third and fourth war patrols, December 1944 – May 1945 ===
Putting to sea again 24 December, Hardhead began her third war patrol in the South China Sea. Operating with Besugo and Blackfin, Hardhead damaged several ships before sinking Nanshin Maru 2 February 1945. Following lifeguard duty for the B-29 strikes on Singapore she returned to Fremantle 15 February.

Hardhead's fourth war patrol included a special mine-laying mission. She sailed 20 March 1945 and laid mines off French Indochina during the night of 2 April. The submarine then entered the Gulf of Siam, where after several attacks she sank cargo ship Araosan Maru 6 April. Following a visit to Subic Bay to reload 11 April – 15 April she patrolled the South China Sea, but found few contacts. American submarines had by this time reduced Japanese merchant activity to a trickle, effectively destroying the island nation's lifeline to the outside world. Hardhead returned to Fremantle 16 May.

=== Fifth and sixth war patrols, June – August 1945 ===
Sailing from Fremantle 18 June, Hardhead began her fifth war patrol, to be conducted in the Java Sea. She severely damaged a freighter with her deck guns 22 June, and next day sank four coastal defense craft during an attack on Ambat Roads with Bullhead including submarine chasers Cha-42 (05°44′S 114°16′E) and Cha-113 (ex-Dutch minesweeper A) (05°45′S 114°16′E) and shuttle boat No. 8333 southeast of the Masalembu Islands. The illness of her commanding officer forced Hardhead to end her fifth patrol 17 July at Onslow, Australia.

The submarine departed Onslow on her sixth and last patrol 18 July, and headed back into the Java Sea. On 23 July 1945, she torpedoed and sank the submarine chaser Cha-117 (ex-Dutch Bantam) off the northeast coast of Bali (08°10′S 115°29′E). She forced a merchant ship to beach 27 July but found few targets and returned to Subic Bay 10 August. Soon afterward the Pacific war ended. Hardhead sailed 31 August and arrived at San Francisco via Pearl Harbor 22 September 1945. She decommissioned 10 May 1946 and entered the Pacific Reserve Fleet at Mare Island.

=== Post-war service, 1952–1972 ===
Hardhead was placed in commission in reserve 6 February 1952 and upon her arrival at New London for conversion was placed out of commission. Following her GUPPY IIA conversion, including streamlining, installation of a snorkel breathing apparatus, and larger storage batteries, the submarine recommissioned 24 March 1953. She joined the Atlantic Fleet for training exercises and tactical drills in the years that followed, operating mainly in the Caribbean and off the East Coast of the United States. She sailed for the Mediterranean 7 September 1956 to strengthen the 6th Fleet during the Suez Crisis.

In July 1958 Hardhead, joined Submarine Development Group 2, turning her attention from fleet operations to research and testing of equipment and tactical doctrine. She operated off the East Coast and in the north Atlantic, and by 1961 had won four consecutive "E" awards for her performance. Hardhead continued through 1972 to perform this vital work in maintaining the technical superiority and readiness of the fleet. In 1962, Hardhead participated in the Cuban Missile Crisis.

=== Honors and awards ===
- Asiatic-Pacific Campaign Medal with six battle stars for World War II service
- World War II Victory Medal

All six of Hardhead′s World War II combat patrols were deemed "successful."

=== Greek service ===
Hardhead was decommissioned, struck from the Naval Register, and transferred (sold) under the terms of the Security Assistance Program to Greece. On 26 July 1972 raised the Greek flag at New London (Connecticut) by Lieutenant Commander Nikolaos Vassiliou and sailed to Greece on 29 December 1972. She was commissioned into the Hellenic Navy as Papanikolis (S-114). She was struck from the Greek Naval rolls on 4 May 1993.
