= Droogdok Maatschappij Soerabaja =

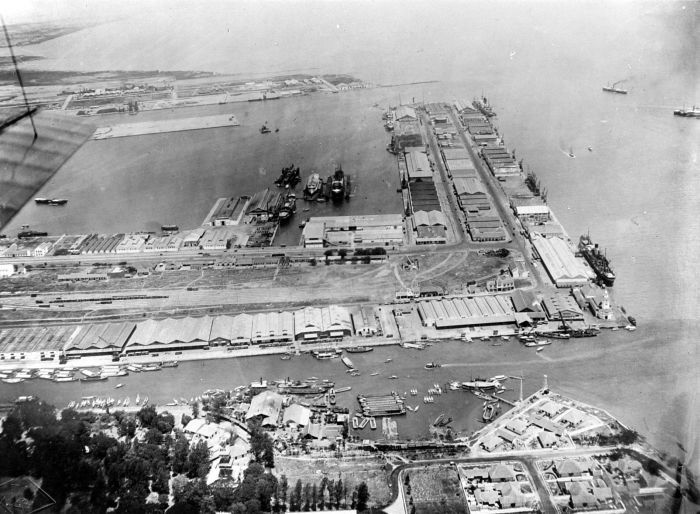
- Terrain of Droogdok Maatschappij Soerabaja in the Port of Soerabaja
- Company type: Naamloze vennootschap
- Industry: Shipbuilding and repair
- Founded: 22 September 1910
- Headquarters: Amsterdam, the Netherlands
- Products: Civilian ships and warships

Droogdok Maatschappij Soerabaja (Note: Sometimes also written as Droogdok-maatschappij Soerabaja or Droogdokmaatschappij Soerabaja.) (DMS) was a Dutch shipbuilding and repair company which had a shipyard in the Dutch East Indies.

== History ==
Droogdok Maatschappij Soerabaja (DMS) was founded on 22 September 1910 by a joint initiative of Dutch companies that included the Royal Rotterdam Lloyd, Java-China-Japan-Lijn and Koninklijke Paketvaart-Maatschappij. The company had a starting capital of 1 million Dutch guilders and the first director was A.C. Zeeman, a former chief inspector of the Dienst van Scheepvaart. The goal of the company was to manage drydocks, build ships and provide ship repairs in the Dutch East Indies.

=== Early years ===
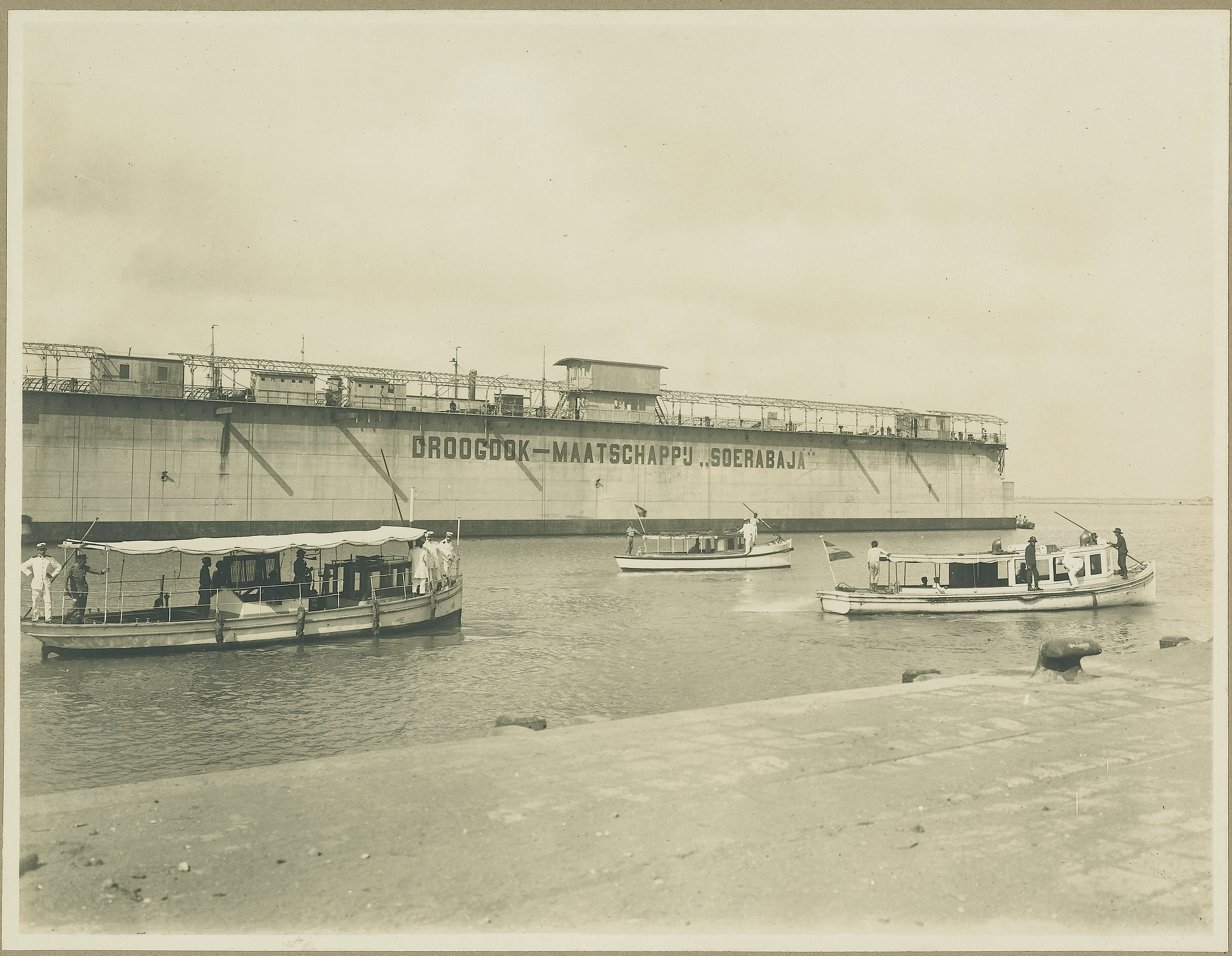
14.000 ton drydock of Droogdok Maatschappij Soerabaja

In the first few years after being established DMS only possessed a single drydock that was used for repairs and could carry up to a maximum of 3500 tons. It was a relatively new dock that had been ordered in 1911. While the dock was built to carry a maximum of 3500 tons, DMS did test if the dock could carry ships that exceeded that tonnage. For example, in 1914 it successfully docked the Norwegian steamship Solveig, which had a weight of 4400 tons, as a test to see if the drydock could carry a ship of that tonnage. That same year DMS also started negotiations with the Dutch authorities about renting the 14.000 ton drydock, which was at the time in reserve at the Marine Etablissement in Soerabaja. That dock had been transported in 1913 from the Netherlands to the Dutch East Indies because there were plans in 1910 to build large cruisers for the Royal Netherlands Navy, which meant that there was a need to dock them in the colony. However, when those plans were postponed the dock had no purpose for the Marine Establissement in Soerabaja and as a result it was put in reserve. The large drydock would allow DMS, on the other hand, to repair larger ships such as the ships of Royal Rotterdam Lloyd which at the time had to go to Singapore to dock for repairs. The Royal Netherlands Navy opposed these plans and did not want to transfer the dock to DMS. Nonetheless, the negotiations were eventually completed and DMS was under certain conditions allowed to rent the 14.000 tons drydock.

In 1919 the workplaces needed for ship repair were expanded to meet all the demand. As a result of large demand for repairs the 3,500 ton dock was only 42 days empty in 1919, while the larger 14,000 tons dock was 70 days empty.

=== Interwar Period ===
Besides shipbuilding and ship repair the company also got involved in the sugar industry in Java during the interwar period. It started to provide repairs for kettles that were used to produce sugar and used its foundry to build work items that were used by the factories. Shipbuilding and ship repair also continued in this period with 1928 being an especially great year for the company with DMS getting many new orders to build ships. To fulfill this increase in demand, the shipbuilding of wooden and steel ships was modernized. DMS also expanded the infrastructure of the shipyard during this period by gaining a third drydock that could handle ships up to 1400 tons and building a second large building on its terrain. The only downside was that the prices for new ships and ship repair continued to be low. While the company was doing well in the 1920s this started to change at the beginning of the 1930s. At the time only the 14,000 tons dock was frequently used and the other two docks were in comparison mostly empty. This led to DMS firing a total of 300 workers in 1930. After receiving support from the Government DMS was performing better and as a result the shipyard had a busy schedule in 1932. The 1930s also saw DMS having some large and unusual orders. For example, between 1933 and 1934 DMS inserted a new mid ship hull section in the middle of the tanker Hermes as the old hull had suffered from wear and tear. This was a rather unique operation at the time as this had only been done so far to 3 ships in the world. In 1937 the DMS signed up for the construction of a new large tin dredger that would replace the Kantoeng. The pontoon of the dredger would be built at DMS in the Dutch East Indies while the superstructure would be built in the Netherlands. Eventually DMS managed to reach an agreement with the shipyard Gusto to build the tin dredger together. Gusto would build the superstructure in the Netherlands and, after disassembling, ship it to the Dutch East Indies where everything would be put together and completed at DMS. On 20 and 21 August 1938 the dredger, in the meanwhile named Soengei Liat, successfully passed trials in the harbor of Soerabaja. The decade ended with DMS being in a good financial position and having favorable prospects regarding work and orders. Besides the three dry docks it also owned a total of five slipways around this time.

=== World War II ===
During the Second World War DMS got several orders of the Royal Netherlands Navy and Government Navy to build warships. The size of these warships ranged from large minelayers such as Regulus to smaller patrol boats.

=== Post-war ===
After the Second World War DMS regained control of the shipyard but there was a lot of damage. Before the war DMS had 5 slipways and three drydocks, but after the war in 1945 only 2 slipways remained functional and only 1 drydock could be used as the others had been either destroyed or sank. Nonetheless, on 1 January 1947 DMS resumed operations under its own management. The company started to restore, replace and expand equipment at the shipyard and bought the Juliandok. It also increased the number of technical staff that worked at the company.

During the 1950s DMS received several important orders of the KPM, the Indonesian government and Pelajaran Nasional Indonesia. However, DMS also faced fierce competition from foreign shipyards. This was mainly because of the increasing wages, costs and system of multiple rates. Nonetheless, DMS did manage to stay profitable, but the ship repair department performed better than the shipbuilding department.

== Organization ==
The headquarters of Droogdok Maatschappij Soerabaja was located in Amsterdam and hosted the board of directors and an executive board. The shipyard itself was located in Soerabaja and was led by an administrator that was assisted by a staff, which consisted of administrative and technical personnel. The terrain of the shipyard was part of the Nieuwe Handelshaven and was rented from the Dutch East Indies government.
