= Battle of the Caribbean =

1941–1945 naval campaign between Allied and Axis forces in World War II

- Part of World War II, Battle of the Atlantic
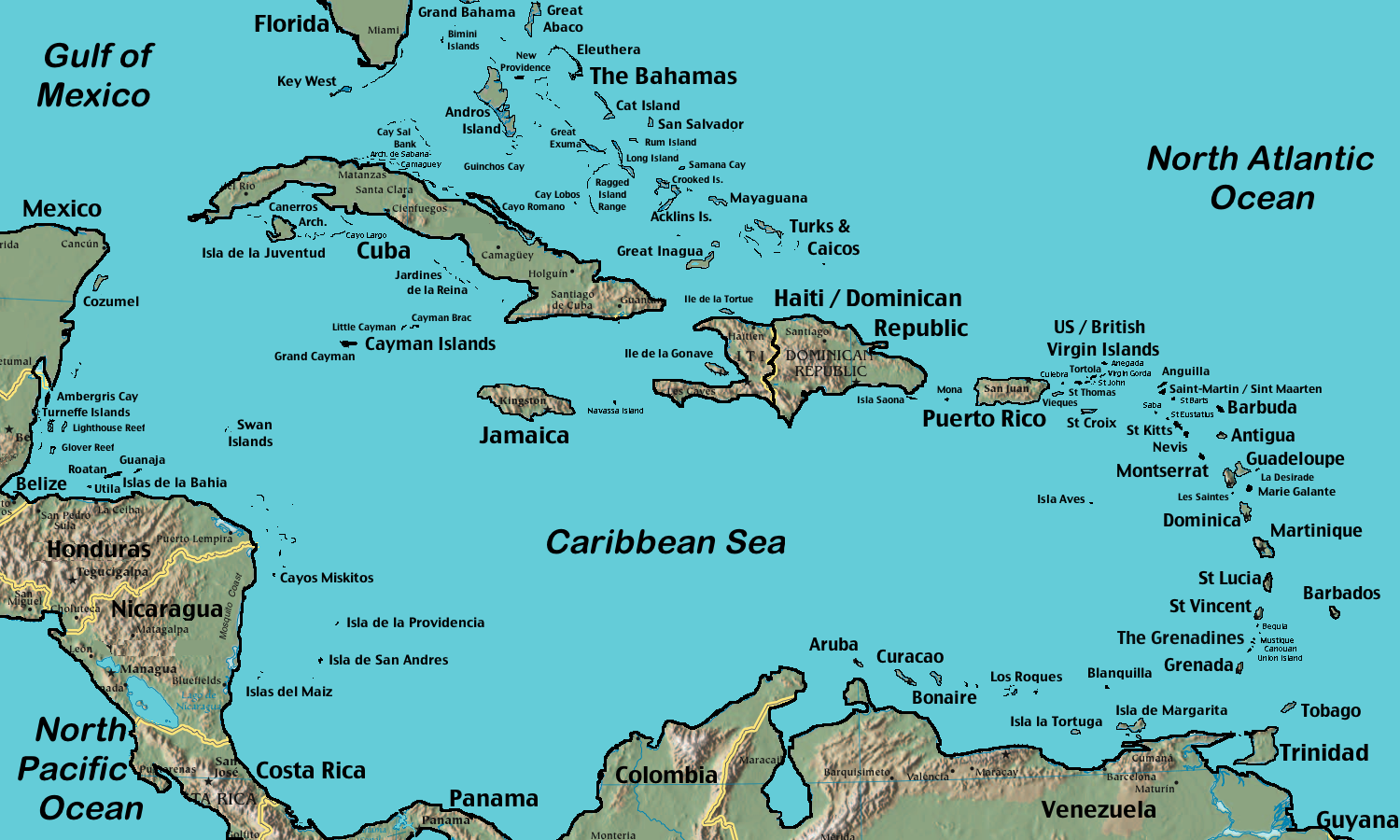
- The Antilles, Caribbean Sea and the Gulf of Mexico
Date	1941–1945
Location	Antilles, Caribbean Sea, Gulf of Mexico
Result	Allied victory

Belligerents
Allies: United States; United Kingdom; Canada; Netherlands; Free France; Cuba; Mexico; Panama; Venezuela; Colombia; Peru other allies	Axis: Germany; Italy; Vichy France

Commanders and leaders
(United States) Ernest J. King (United States) Jesse Oldendorf (United Kingdom) Sir Percy Noble (United Kingdom) Sir Max K. Horton (United States of Venezuela) Isaías Medina Angarita (Republic of Cuba (1902–1959)) Francisco de Menocal Roldán	(Nazi Germany) Erich Raeder (Nazi Germany) Karl Dönitz (Fascist Italy) Romolo Polacchini

Casualties and losses
400 merchant ships sunk	17 submarines

The Battle of the Caribbean refers to a naval campaign waged during World War II that was part of the Battle of the Atlantic, from 1941 to 1945. German U-boats and Italian submarines attempted to disrupt the Allied supply of oil and other material. They sank shipping in the Caribbean Sea and the Gulf of Mexico and attacked coastal targets in the Antilles. Improved Allied anti-submarine warfare eventually drove the Axis submarines out of the Caribbean region.

== Background ==
The Caribbean was strategically significant because of Venezuelan oil fields in the southeast and the Panama Canal in the southwest. The Royal Dutch Shell refinery on Dutch-owned Curaçao was processing eleven million barrels per month, more than any other oil refinery in the world at that time. The refinery at Pointe-à-Pierre on Trinidad was the largest in the British Empire and Lago Oil and Transport Company was another large refinery on Dutch-owned Aruba. The British Isles required four oil tankers of petroleum daily during the early war years, and most of it came from Venezuela, through Curaçao, after Italy blocked passage through the Mediterranean Sea from the Middle East.

The Caribbean held additional strategic significance to the United States. The United States' Gulf of Mexico coastline, including petroleum facilities and Mississippi River trade, could be defended at two points. The United States was well positioned to defend the Straits of Florida but was less able to prevent access from the Caribbean through the Yucatán Channel. Bauxite was the preferred ore for aluminum, and one of the few strategic raw materials not available within the continental United States. United States military aircraft production depended upon bauxite imported from the Guianas along shipping routes paralleling the Lesser Antilles. The United States defended the Panama Canal with 189 bombers and 202 fighters, and based submarines at Colón, Panama and at Submarine Base, Crown Bay, St. Thomas, U.S. Virgin Islands. United States Navy VP-51 Consolidated PBY Catalinas began neutrality patrols along the Lesser Antillies from San Juan, Puerto Rico on 13 September 1939; and facilities were upgraded at Guantanamo Bay Naval Base and at Naval Air Station Key West.

The United Kingdom based No. 749, 750, 752 and 793 Naval Air Squadrons at Piarco International Airport on Trinidad. British troops occupied Aruba, Curaçao and Bonaire soon after the Netherlands were captured by Nazi Germany. The French island of Martinique was perceived as a possible base for Axis ships as British relationships with Vichy France deteriorated following the Second Armistice at Compiègne. The September 1940 Destroyers for Bases Agreement enabled the United States to build airfields in British Guiana, and on the islands of Great Exuma, Trinidad, Antigua, and Saint Lucia. On 11 February 1942, United States forces replaced British soldiers on the Dutch refinery islands and began operating Douglas A-20 Havocs from Hato Field on Curaçao and Dakota Field on Aruba.

== Axis operations ==
=== Operation Neuland ===
The first offensive against the Caribbean refineries was organised under the command of Kapitänleutnant (lieutenant) Werner Hartenstein aboard U-156 with and U-502, U-67, U-129, and U-161. The first three U-boats launched simultaneous attacks on 16 February 1942. U-502 sank crude oil tankers Monagas, Tia Juana and San Nicholas between Lake Maracaibo and Aruba. U-67 entered Willemstad harbour on Curaçao and torpedoed three oil tankers. The four torpedoes from the bow tubes were duds, but the stern tube torpedoes sank Rafaela. U-156 entered San Nicolas harbour on Aruba and torpedoed oil tankers Pedernales, Oranjestad and Arkansas. U-156 then attempted to shell the Aruba refinery with its 10.5 cm SK C/32 naval gun; but the gun barrel burst when the first shell exploded because the gun crew failed to remove the tampion. The Germans slightly damaged a large storage tank. A Venezuelan gunboat, General Urdaneta, assisted in rescuing the crews of several torpedoed vessels; and A-20 Havoc light bombers attacked all three U-boats unsuccessfully; resulting in an increased American occupation of the island for its protection.

U-161 entered Trinidad's Gulf of Paria on 18 February to torpedo Mokihama and the oil tanker British Consul. As the U-boats settled into routine patrolling, U-67 torpedoed oil tankers J.N.Pew and Penelope; U-502 torpedoed oil tankers Kongsgaard, Thallia and Sun; U-156 torpedoed Delplata and oil tanker La Carriere; U-161 torpedoed Lihue and oil tankers Circle Shell, Uniwaleco and Esso Bolivar; and U-129 torpedoed George L. Torrain, West Zeda, Lennox, Bayou, Mary, Steel Age and the oil tanker Nordvangen. The U-156 crew used hacksaws to cut off the damaged portion of the gun barrel; and, when U-156 ran out of torpedoes, used their sawn-off deck gun to sink Macgregor and the oil tanker Oregon. On 10 March U-161 entered Castries harbour on Saint Lucia to torpedo HMCS Lady Nelson and Umtata. After leaving Saint Lucia, U-161 torpedoed Sarniadoc and sank the United States Coast Guard lighthouse tender USCGC Acacia with gunfire.

=== Other operations ===
Five Italian submarines patrolled the Atlantic side of the Lesser Antillies during Operation Neuland. Morosini torpedoed Stangarth and oil tankers Oscilla and Peder Bogen. Enrico Tazzoli torpedoed Cygnet and the oil tanker Athelqueen. Giuseppe Finzi torpedoed Skane and oil tankers Melpomere and Charles Racine. Italian submarine Leonardo da Vinci torpedoed Everasma and the neutral Brazilian Cabadelo. Luigi Torelli torpedoed Scottish Star and the oil tanker Esso Copenhagen. U-126 was simultaneously patrolling the Windward Passage between Cuba and Hispaniola torpedoing Gunny, Barbara, Cardona, Texan, Olga, Colabee, and oil tankers Hanseat and Halo between 2 March and 13 March. U-504 moved south from Florida.

A German submarine shelled the Puerto Rican island of Mona, some forty miles west of the mainland of Puerto Rico, on March 3, 1942. No damage or casualties resulted.

An oil refinery on Curaçao was shelled on 19 April 1942 by U-130 under Korvettenkapitän (lieutenant commander) Ernst Kals. The small engagement ended in a German failure. Kals ordered the shelling of several petroleum storage tanks but after only five shots, a Dutch shore battery responded which forced him to abort. Later a German U-boat attacked a merchant ship off Curaçao and was engaged by Dutch anti-aircraft and naval gun batteries but again the submarine escaped unharmed.

German submarines sank two Dominican merchant marine ships in May 1942, after the Dominican Republic entered World War II on the side of the Allies.

=== Attacks on Allied shipping ===
SS Norlantic was an American-flagged, 3,860 GRT cargo ship that was sunk on the morning of 13 May in the Caribbean by a U-boat. She was transporting a load of random cargo from Pensacola, Florida to Venezuela when attacked by U-69 90 mi (78 nmi; 140 km) east of Bonaire. At 03:38, U-69—under the command of Kptlt. Ulrich Graf—fired two torpedoes from a surfaced position. Both torpedoes missed, so Graf ordered his crew to close the range to 2,200 yd (2,000 m) and to open fire with the deck gun at 03:47. U-69 began shelling Norlantic as she attempted to flee the scene. After several hits the American ship signaled the Germans to cease fire so they could escape the inferno in their life-rafts. The Germans failed to hold their fire while two lifeboats were lowered, then at 04:11 they fired a coup de grâce which hit Norlantic's boiler room. She sank, taking six men down with her, two men were killed by the torpedo and four men killed from the shelling. Norlantic's surviving crew were then adrift at sea for several days before being rescued by Allied ships.

German U-boats sank two Mexican tankers, Potrero del Llano on 14 May by Reinhard Suhren's U-564 off Florida, and Faja de Oro on 21 May by Hermann Rasch's U-106 off Key West. Sixteen men died in the two attacks. This prompted Mexico to declare war on Germany on 22 May 1942.

SS Sylvan Arrow was a tanker of the Standard Oil and Transportation Company during World War II when U-155 torpedoed her. The attack occurred on 20 May just southwest of Grenada in the Caribbean Sea. Attempts to tow her to port did not succeed, and she sank on 28 May, at position 12° 50' north, 67° 32' west.

The tanker SS Hagan was sunk by U-157 on 11 June about 5 mi (4.3 nmi; 8.0 km) north of the Cuban coast. The American ship holding thousands of barrels of molasses was hit in the engine room. The torpedo destroyed the engines and caused a boiler to explode and a moment later another torpedo hit the ship. Six men were killed and 38 survivors made it to shore. Two days later, U-157 was sunk by USCGC Thetis.

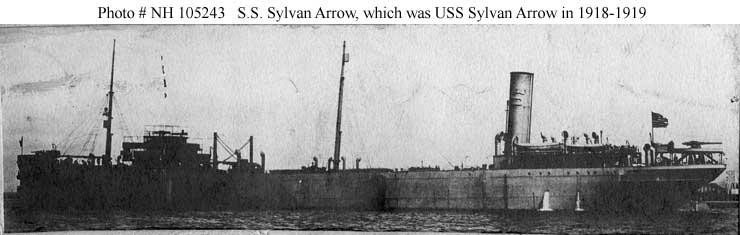
SS Sylvan Arrow in 1917

U-171 attacked the 6,511 GRT Mexican tanker SS Amatlan on 4 September at the position 23°27′N 97°30′W / 23.45°N 97.5°W / 23.45; -97.5. The Mexicans evaded three attacks of two torpedoes each before being hit by one in a final spread. Amatlan sank with 10 men and another 24 sailors survived.

On 11 September, U-514—under Kptlt. Hans-Jürgen Auffermann—torpedoed the armed Canadian steam merchant SS Cornwallis off the coastline of Bridgetown. The ship sank in shallow waters after a short exchange, but was raised and towed to Trinidad in December 1942 and later towed to Mobile, Alabama, arriving on 24 January 1943. The ship was repaired and returned to service in August 1943, but was torpedoed a second time, this time by U-1230 on 3 December 1944 in the Gulf of Maine, and sank.

On 5 July 1943, 70 mi (61 nmi; 110 km) to the west of Port-Salut, Haiti, U-759 encountered the American-flagged steamer Maltran, which was part of Convoy GTMO-134. U-759 fired torpedoes and at least one hit the vessel. Maltran sank within 15 minutes of being hit, though all of her crew survived and escaped the danger in lifeboats. The crew was later rescued by USS SC-1279. On 7 July, U-759 torpedoed the Dutch cargo ship Poelau Roebiah, in Convoy TAG-70. The ship sank just east of Jamaica, taking down two men. Sixty-eight others were rescued. After sinking Poelau Roebiah U-759 was chased down and attacked by the U.S. Navy the following day. A PBM Mariner flying boat first dropped a load of explosives over the sub, and then for seven hours American surface vessels depth charged the area, but U-759 escaped without damage or loss of life.

== Losses ==
=== Axis vessels ===
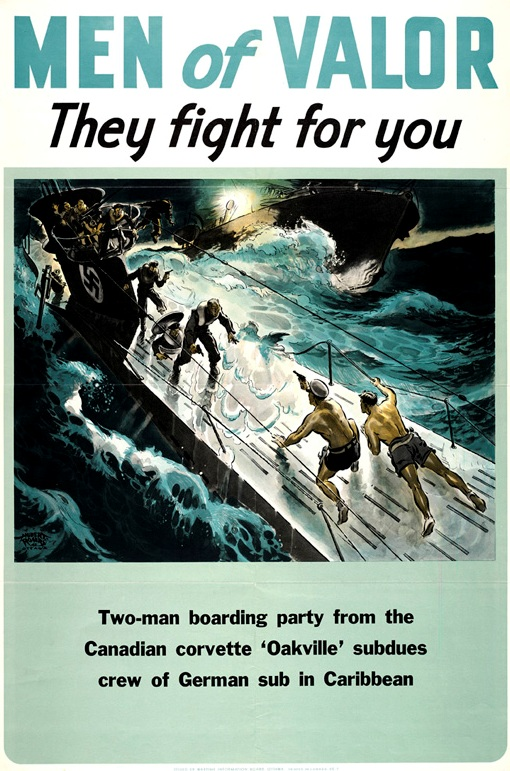
Canadian propaganda poster depicting the boarding of U-94 on 28 August 1942.

U-157 was sunk on 13 June 1942 by the U.S. Coast Guard. The U-boat was surface cruising just southwest of Key West, in position 24°13′N 82°03′W, when sighted by USCGC Thetis. The German submarine submerged and attempted to flee but Thetis gained sonar contact and began a depth charge attack. After several minutes, the action ended when debris and oil were spotted by the Coast Guard crew. Thetis sank U-157.

Seven days after escaping attacking Allied ships off Haiti on 8 July 1943, U-759 was reported sunk; post war research discovered it was not until an attack on 23 July that she was actually destroyed. An American PBM Mariner at the approximate position of 15°58′N 73°44′W bombed and sank the boat.

German submarine U-158 off Bermuda at coordinates 32°50′N 67°28′W on 30 June 1942 was sunk by a Martin PBM Mariner commanded by Richard Schreder. A depth charge struck the deck of the submarine, but did not explode on impact; it merely lodged in the teak planking. However, as the U-boat submerged, the charge detonated after the sub carried it down to its pre-set trigger depth.

The freighter SS Robert E. Lee was under escort by the American patrol chaser USS PC-566 45 mi (39 nmi; 72 km) south of the Mississippi River Delta on 30 July 1942. Suddenly, a torpedo hit Lee, and PC-566 discovered the attacking U-166. PC-566 launched depth charges at the submarine and sank her though it was not until after the war sinking was confirmed.

On 28 August, U-94 was in operation against convoy TAW 15 off Haiti when attacked by American and Canadian escorts. First, an American PBY swooped down and bombed the U-boat, and then Canadian corvettes HMCS Halifax and Snowberry attacked. HMCS Oakville fired depth charges which forced the submarine to the surface. The corvette then rammed U-94 twice before it slowed to a stop. Hal Lawrence led a boarding party of eleven sailors from Oakville to capture the boat. They boarded the vessel and entered through the conning tower. Only two Canadians actually went through the hatch; they were surprised by two Germans who came running towards them. After ordering halt, the Canadians fired and killed the attacking Germans when they failed to stop. The rest of the crew surrendered without incident. After just barely capturing the vessel, the Canadian sailors realized the Germans had already scuttled the boat and it was taking on water. The Canadians left U-94 and she sank with nineteen of her crew; Oakville rescued 26, including the commander, Oberleutnant zur See Otto Ites.

U-162 was detected and sunk northeast of Trinidad by the Royal Navy on 3 September. Three British destroyers—HMS Vimy, Pathfinder and Quentin—attacked U-162 with depth charges, killed two Germans and sank the boat. Forty-nine additional sailors survived and became prisoners of war in the U.S. The crew was interrogated and provided valuable information to the U.S. Army Intelligence about U-boats and their submarine base at Lorient. The German skipper—Kptlt. Jürgen Wattenberg—escaped in late 1944 before being recaptured a month or so later.

On 15 May 1943, the Cuban freighters Camaguey and Honduran Hanks were being escorted by three small Cuban Navy submarine chasers from Sagua La Grande to Havana. The convoy was nearing Havana in the Gulf of Mexico when an American reconnaissance aircraft spotted a German U-boat. The aircraft dropped a smoke float over U-176, and the Cuban submarine chaser CS-13—under Alférez Delgado (Second Lieutenant) —picked up the enemy craft with sonar. CS-13 attacked with depth charges and quickly sank the U-boat which killed all of her crew.

=== Allied vessels ===
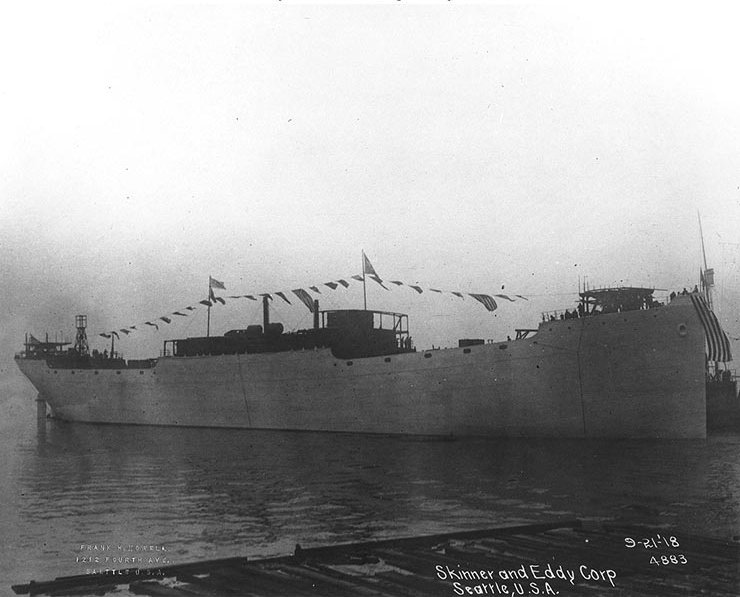
USAT Major General Henry Gibbins before World War II

The French submarine cruiser Surcouf was the largest submarine in the world at the time. An American report concluded the disappearance was due to an accidental collision with the American freighter Thomas Lykes near the Atlantic side of the Panama Canal on 18 February 1942. There were no survivors. The investigation of the French commission concluded the disappearance was the consequence of misunderstanding. A Consolidated PBY, patrolling the same waters on the night of 18/19 February, could have attacked Surcouf believing her to be German or Japanese. This possibility is backed by several elements.

SS George Calvert, a one-gun Liberty ship, was sailing off eastern Cuba when she was sunk by U-753 on 20 May 1942. Ten men were killed when three torpedoes slammed into her, sinking her within minutes. The surviving crew were captured by the Germans and interrogated before being freed in lifeboats. Three armed guards were killed and the survivors made it to the Cuban shore.

On 23 June, the unarmed USAT Major General Henry Gibbins was steaming alone almost 400 mi (350 nmi; 640 km) west of Key West, Florida, when she was attacked by U-158. Two torpedoes hit the coffee-laden Henry Gibbins on her port side over the course of 20 minutes and she sank soon after. All of her 47 crew and 21 U.S. Army guards were rescued a day later.

SS Stephen Hopkins was an armed American Liberty ship which fought during World War II. On 27 September, Stephen Hopkins was returning to Surinam from Cape Town when attacked by the auxiliary cruiser Stier. Stephen Hopkins was ordered to stop by the Germans, the Americans refused, so they opened fire with their main battery. A lone 4 in (100 mm) gun and a few machine guns were then put in operation by the Americans and a short but violent battle was fought. Both vessels suffered casualties and by 10:00 the American ship had sunk. Stier was badly damaged as well and could no longer make steam, so her commander scuttled her less than two hours after defeating the American vessel.

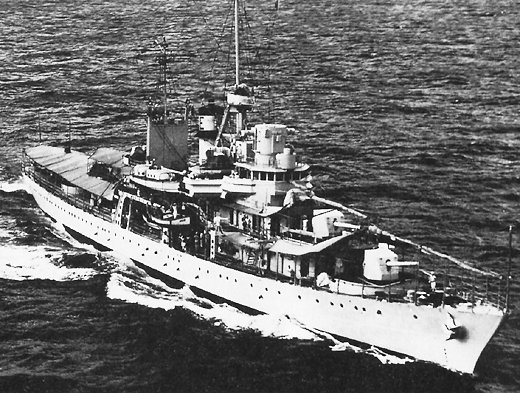
USS Erie during the Battle of the Caribbean

The American gunboat USS Erie was escorting Convoy TAG-20 in the Caribbean between Trinidad and Guantánamo Bay when attacked 10 miles south of Curaçao by a German U-boat in November 1942. U-163—under Kurt-Eduard Engelmann—surfaced and fired three torpedoes at Erie. The Americans spotted the submarine and the torpedoes, then took evasive maneuvers. Erie escaped two of them but was hit by the third and badly damaged. Her crew grounded her on the nearby shore and she burned for several hours before the flames were brought under control. American forces suffered seven killed and eleven wounded in the attack. Later, Erie was towed to Curaçao's Willemstad Harbor but capsized and sank on 5 December.

=== Survivors ===
Almost 400 Allied ships were sunk in the broader Caribbean during the conflict. 130 of these were sunk in and around the Bahamas. Of those near the Bahamas, nearly 6000 sailors were thrown in the water, approximately 400 of whom were able to survive by making it to one of the Turks and Caicos or Bahamas Islands in lifeboats: at least 72 survivors landed in the Turks and Caicos and a further 334 landed in the Bahamas. At the time the Governor of the Bahamas was Edward VIII, the abdicated King of England and a royal who some suspected of having German leanings. Despite this, the survivors were treated generously, including by Wallis Simpson, the Governor's wife and head of the Red Cross in the Bahamas. Wallis was instrumental in helping survivors who made it to Nassau, greeting most personally and setting up a canteen, accommodation, and other amenities for them, writing in her memoirs, "we received some truly heart-wrenching cases, men who had drifted for days without food or water under the searing tropical sun." Surviving sailors were generally highly trained and hard to replace, and were usually sent back to England as quickly as possible for continued wartime service.

Allied losses by year
Year	Ships	Tonnage
1942	336	1,559,422
1943	35	177,945
1944	3	14,804

== In fiction ==
- The Battle of the Caribbean forms part of the plot of the novel Sharks and Little Fish. The protagonist's U-boat is first sent into the Caribbean and takes part in sinking American vessels off Trinidad, before being moved to the North Atlantic.
- The Howard Hawks film To Have and Have Not is set in Vichy government controlled-Martinique in the summer of 1940.
- The 1969 teen novel The Cay by Theodore Taylor has the Battle for the Caribbean as part of the background for the beginning of the story, set in the Dutch colony of Curaçao as it begins to experience U-Boat attacks. The sinking of a vessel by a U-Boat leads to the stranding of the novel's main characters, a white American boy, Phillip, and a black West Indian man, Timothy, on a small island, where Phillip is forced to overcome his prejudices while Timothy teaches him to survive in light of their circumstances.
- In the 1980 Robert R. McCammon novel The Night Boat, a German submarine is sunk soon after shelling a Caribbean island. Its crew remains trapped aboard the submarine, kept alive by a voodoo curse, until an underwater explosion sets them free to wreak havoc in the 1980s.

== See also ==
- Martinique in World War II
- Naval Base Trinidad
