= Calvi-class submarine =

Italian submarine class

- Giuseppe Finzi

Class overview
- Name: Calvi class
- Builders: Odero-Terni-Orlando, Muggiano, La Spezia
- Operators: Regia Marina
- Preceded by: Pietro Micca
- Succeeded by: Foca class
- Built: 1935
- In commission: 1936–1943
- Completed: 3
- Lost: 2
- Scrapped: 1

General characteristics
- Type: Submarine cruiser
- Displacement: 1,549 t (1,525 long tons) (surfaced); 2,061 t (2,028 long tons) (submerged)
- Length: 84.3 m (276 ft 7 in)
- Beam: 7.7 m (25 ft 3 in)
- Draft: 5.2 m (17 ft 1 in)
- Installed power: 4,400 bhp (3,300 kW) (diesels); 1,800 hp (1,300 kW) (electric motors)
- Propulsion: 2 shafts; diesel-electric; 2 × diesel engines; 2 × electric motors
- Speed: 16.8 knots (31.1 km/h; 19.3 mph) (surfaced); 7.4 knots (13.7 km/h; 8.5 mph) (submerged)
- Range: 11,400 nmi (21,100 km; 13,100 mi) at 8 knots (15 km/h; 9.2 mph) (surfaced); 120 nmi (220 km; 140 mi) at 3 knots (5.6 km/h; 3.5 mph) (submerged)
- Test depth: 90 m (300 ft)
- Crew: 77
- Armament: 8 × 533 mm (21 in) torpedo tubes (4 bow, 4 stern); 2 × single 120 mm (4.7 in) deck guns; 2 × twin 13.2 mm (0.52 in) machine guns

The Calvi class was a class of three submarines built by Oderno-Terni-Orlando in Genoa for the Royal Italian Navy (Italian: Regia Marina). The submarines were built in 1935, and all three served in the Mediterranean at the start of the Second World War. The boats were transferred to the BETASOM Atlantic submarine base at Bordeaux in August 1940. In December 1941 the boats were used for a rescue mission of 254 sailors from the sunken German auxiliary cruiser Atlantis. After Calvi had been sunk, Finzi and Tazzoli were selected for conversion to "transport submarines" in order to exchange rare or irreplaceable trade goods with Japan. Cargo capacity of 160 tons reduced reserve buoyancy from 20–25% to 3.5–6%; and armament was reduced to defensive machine guns.

== Design and description ==
The Calvi class was an improved and enlarged version of the preceding Balilla-class submarine cruisers. They displaced 1,549 metric tons (1,525 long tons) surfaced and 2,061 metric tons (2,028 long tons) submerged. The submarines were 84.3 meters (276 ft 7 in) long, had a beam of 7.7 meters (25 ft 3 in) and a draft of 5.2 meters (17 ft 1 in). They had an operational diving depth of 90 meters (300 ft). Their crew numbered 77 officers and enlisted men.

For surface running, the boats were powered by two 2,200-brake-horsepower (1,641 kW) diesel engines, each driving one propeller shaft. When submerged each propeller was driven by a 900-horsepower (671 kW) electric motor. They could reach 16.8 knots (31.1 km/h; 19.3 mph) on the surface and 7.4 knots (13.7 km/h; 8.5 mph) underwater. On the surface, the Calvi class had a range of 11,400 nautical miles (21,100 km; 13,100 mi) at 8 knots (15 km/h; 9.2 mph); submerged, they had a range of 120 nmi (220 km; 140 mi) at 3 knots (5.6 km/h; 3.5 mph).

The boats were armed with eight 53.3-centimeter (21 in) torpedo tubes, four each in the bow and in the stern for which they carried a total of 16 torpedoes. They were also armed with a pair of 120-millimeter (4.7 in) deck guns, one each fore and aft of the conning tower, for combat on the surface. Their anti-aircraft armament consisted of two twin-gun mounts for 13.2-millimeter (0.52 in) machine guns.

== Ships ==
=== Pietro Calvi ===
Pietro Calvi (pennant number CV) was launched 31 March 1935. During the Spanish Civil War, she unsuccessfully fired a pair of torpedoes each at the 6,942-gross register ton (GRT) mail steamer SS Villa de Madrid and the 3946 GRT mail steamer SS Ciudad de Barcelona during a patrol on 1–17 January 1937. During the night of 12/13 January she bombarded the port of Valencia.

The first patrol during the Second World War was from Liguria to the Atlantic Ocean, and lasted from 3 July to 6 August 1940. After overhaul at La Spezia, Calvi sailed on 6 October 1940 for a second Atlantic patrol, reaching Bordeaux on 23 October. Calvi suffered storm damage during its third patrol off the British Isles from 3 to 31 December 1940. The fourth patrol was between the Canary Islands and the Azores from 31 March to 13 May 1941. Calvi sailed on 1 August 1941 for a fifth patrol off the Canary Islands. During the sixth patrol from 7 to 29 December 1941 Calvi, Finzi and Tazzoli rescued sailors of the sunken raider Atlantis. The seventh patrol was off Brazil from 7 March to 29 April 1942. Calvi sailed on 2 July 1942 for its eighth patrol. Calvi was rammed and sunk on 14 July 1942 by convoy SL 115 escort HMS Lulworth. Three officers and 32 sailors survived.

Ships sunk by Pietro Calvi
Ship	Country	Patrol	Date	Tonnage (GRT)	Notes
Carlton	United Kingdom	3rd	20 December 1940	5,162	freighter from convoy OB 260; 4 survivors from a crew of 35
Tredinnick	United Kingdom	7th	25 March 1942	4,589	freighter, no survivors
T.C. McCobb	United States	7th	1 April 1942	7,452	tanker; 24 killed; first US ship sunk by an Italian submarine
Eugene V.R. Thayer	United States	7th	9 April 1942	7,138	tanker; 11 killed
Balkis	Norway	7th	April 1942	2,161	freighter
Ben Brush	Panama	7th	April 1942	7,691	tanker; 1 killed
Total:				34,193	

=== Giuseppe Finzi ===
Giuseppe Finzi (pennant number FZ) was launched 29 June 1935. The first war patrol was from Cagliari to the Atlantic, and lasted from 5 June to 10 July 1940. The submarine sailed on 7 September 1940 and passed the Strait of Gibraltar on 13 September for an Atlantic patrol to Bordeaux, France, on 29 September. Admiral Karl Dönitz visited Giuseppe Finzi on 30 September to welcome Regia Marina sailors to the German base. The third patrol near the British Isles from 24 October to 4 December 1940 revealed that the diesel engine air intake was too exposed for North Atlantic winter weather. The fourth patrol was near the Canary Islands from 10 March to 17 April 1941 and the fifth patrol was off Gibraltar in August. During the sixth patrol from 7 to 29 December 1941 Pietro Calvi, Giuseppe Finzi and Enrico Tazzoli rescued sailors of the sunken German commerce raider Atlantis. The submarine sailed for Operation Neuland on 6 February 1942 and returned on 31 March. She returned to the Caribbean Sea for an eighth patrol from 6 June to 18 August 1942. On 26 November 1942 Giuseppe Finzi sailed for a ninth patrol to Brazil; but mechanical problems required return to base on 10 December. The boat patrolled the West African coast from 11 February to 18 April 1943. Conversion to a transport submarine was never completed, and the boat was seized by the Germans on 9 September 1943 when Italy surrendered to the Allies. Renamed UIT21 in German service, she was scuttled at Le Verdon-sur-Mer on 25 August 1944 to prevent her capture by the advancing Allied forces.

Ships sunk by Giuseppe Finzi
Ship	Country	Patrol	Date	Tonnage (GRT)	Notes
Melpomese	United Kingdom	7th	6 March 1942	7,011	tanker, no casualties
Boren	Sweden	7th	6 March 1942	4,528	freighter; no casualties
Charles Racine	Norway	7th	10 March 1942	9,957	tanker; no casualties
Granicos	Greece	10th	28 March 1943	3,689	iron ore freighter sank in less than 30 seconds, one survivor from a crew of 31
Celtic Star	United Kingdom	10th	29 March 1943	5,575	freighter, 2 killed
Total:				30,760	

=== Enrico Tazzoli ===
Enrico Tazzoli (pennant number TZ) was launched 14 October 1935. It was named after Enrico Tazzoli, a martyr of the Italian wars of independence. The first wartime patrol was off the coast of North Africa from 21 June to 2 July 1940. The second was an unsuccessful attempt to pass the Strait of Gibraltar from 30 July to 9 August 1940. After overhaul at La Spezia, Enrico Tazzoli sailed on 2 October 1940 and passed the Strait of Gibraltar on 7 October for an Atlantic patrol to Bordeaux on 24 October. The fourth patrol was off the British Isles from 13 December 1940 to 6 January 1941. The boat sailed on 7 April 1941 to patrol between Freetown and the Azores; and shot down an attacking Bristol Blenheim while returning to port on 23 May. The sixth patrol was again off Freetown from 15 July to 11 September 1941. During the seventh patrol from 7 to 27 December 1941 Pietro Calvi, Giuseppe Finzi and Tazzoli rescued sailors of the sunken German commerce raider Atlantis. The submarine sailed for Operation Neuland on 2 February 1942 and returned on 31 March. The ninth patrol was again to the Caribbean from 18 June to 5 September 1942; and the tenth patrol was to Brazil from 14 November 1942 to 2 February 1943. After conversion to a transport submarine for blockade-running between Europe and the Far East, Enrico Tazzoli sailed for Japan on 16 May 1943 and was sunk by aircraft in the Bay of Biscay on 23 May.

Ships sunk by Enrico Tazzoli
Ship	Country	Patrol	Date	Tonnage (GRT)	Notes
Orao	Yugoslavia	3rd	12 October 1940	5,135	Freighter shelled then torpedoed while radioing; 2 killed
Ardanbahn	United Kingdom	4th	27 December 1940	4,980	No survivors from freighter of unescorted Convoy OB 263
Aurillac	United Kingdom	5th	15 April 1941	4,248	Freighter, 1 killed
Fernlane	Norway	5th	7 May 1941	4,310	Freighter with ammunition cargo, no casualties
Alfred Olsen	Norway	5th	10 May 1941	8,817	Tanker, no casualties
Sildra	Norway	6th	19 August 1941	7,313	Tanker, no casualties
Astrea	Netherlands	8th	6 March 1942	1,406	Freighter, no casualties
Tonsbergfjord	Norway	8th	6 March 1942	3,156	Freighter; 1 killed
Montevideo	Uruguay	8th	8 March 1942	5,785	Freighter; 14 killed
Cygnet	Greece	8th	10 March 1942	3,628	Freighter; no casualties
Daytonian	United Kingdom	8th	13 March 1942	6,434	Freighter; 1 killed
Athelqueen	United Kingdom	8th	15 March 1942	8,780	Tanker; 3 killed
Kastor	Greece	9th	2 August 1942	5,497	Freighter; 4 killed
Havsten	Norway	9th	6 August 1942	6,161	Tanker; 2 killed
Empire Hawk	United Kingdom	10th	12 December 1942	5,032	Freighter, no casualties
Ombilin	Netherlands	10th	12 December 1942	5,658	Freighter, no casualties
Queen City	United Kingdom	10th	21 December 1942	4,814	Freighter, 6 killed
Doña Aurora	United States	10th	25 December 1942	5,011	Freighter, 7 killed
Total:				96,165	

== See also ==
- Italian submarines of World War II
