= Italian submarine Pietro Calvi =

Italian submarine

History

Kingdom of Italy
- Name: Pietro Calvi
- Builder: Odero-Terni-Orlando, Muggiano, La Spezia
- Laid down: 1932
- Launched: 3 March 1935
- Commissioned: 1936
- Fate: Sunk by HMS Lulworth, 15 July 1943

General characteristics
- Class & type: Calvi-class submarine cruiser
- Displacement: 1,549 t (1,525 long tons) (surfaced); 2,061 t (2,028 long tons) (submerged)
- Length: 84.3 m (276 ft 7 in)
- Beam: 7.7 m (25 ft 3 in)
- Draft: 5.2 m (17 ft 1 in)
- Installed power: 4,400 bhp (3,300 kW) (diesels); 1,800 hp (1,300 kW) (electric motors)
- Propulsion: 2 shafts; diesel-electric; 2 × diesel engines; 2 × electric motors
- Speed: 16.8 knots (31.1 km/h; 19.3 mph) (surfaced); 7.4 knots (13.7 km/h; 8.5 mph) (submerged)
- Range: 11,400 nmi (21,100 km; 13,100 mi) at 8 knots (15 km/h; 9.2 mph) (surfaced); 120 nmi (220 km; 140 mi) at 3 knots (5.6 km/h; 3.5 mph) (submerged)
- Test depth: 90 m (300 ft)
- Crew: 77
- Armament: 8 × 533 mm (21 in) torpedo tubes (4 bow, 4 stern); 2 × single 120 mm (4.7 in) deck guns; 2 × twin 13.2 mm (0.52 in) machine guns

Pietro Calvi was the lead ship of its class of two submarines built for the Regia Marina (Royal Italian Navy) during the 1930s. Completed in 1936, she played a minor role in the Spanish Civil War of 1936–1939 supporting the Spanish Nationalists. The submarine made multiple patrols in the Atlantic Ocean during the Second World War, sinking seven Allied ships. Pietro Calvi was rammed and sunk by a British convoy escort in July 1942.

== Design and description ==
The Calvi class was an improved and enlarged version of the preceding Balilla-class submarine cruisers. They displaced 1,549 metric tons (1,525 long tons) surfaced and 2,061 metric tons (2,028 long tons) submerged. The submarines were 84.3 meters (276 ft 7 in) long, had a beam of 7.7 meters (25 ft 3 in) and a draft of 5.2 meters (17 ft 1 in). They had an operational diving depth of 90 meters (300 ft). Their crew numbered 77 officers and enlisted men.

For surface running, the boats were powered by two 2,200-brake-horsepower (1,641 kW) diesel engines, each driving one propeller shaft. When submerged each propeller was driven by a 900-horsepower (671 kW) electric motor. They could reach 16.8 knots (31.1 km/h; 19.3 mph) on the surface and 7.4 knots (13.7 km/h; 8.5 mph) underwater. On the surface, the Calvi class had a range of 11,400 nautical miles (21,100 km; 13,100 mi) at 8 knots (15 km/h; 9.2 mph); submerged, they had a range of 120 nmi (220 km; 140 mi) at 3 knots (5.6 km/h; 3.5 mph).

The boats were armed with eight 53.3-centimeter (21 in) torpedo tubes, four each in the bow and in the stern for which they carried a total of 16 torpedoes. They were also armed with a pair of 120-millimeter (4.7 in) deck guns, one each fore and aft of the conning tower, for combat on the surface. Their anti-aircraft armament consisted of two twin-gun mounts for 13.2-millimeter (0.52 in) machine guns.

== Construction and career ==
Pietro Calvi (pennant number CV) was built by Odero-Terni-Orlando at their Muggiano, La Spezia, shipyard. Laid down in 1932, the submarine was launched on 31 March 1935 and completed in 1936.

During the Spanish Civil War, she unsuccessfully fired a pair of torpedoes each at the 6,942-gross register ton (GRT) mail steamer SS Villa de Madrid and the 3946 GRT mail steamer SS Ciudad de Barcelona during a patrol on 1–17 January 1937. During the night of 12/13 January she bombarded the port of Valencia.

The first patrol during the Second World War was from Liguria to the Atlantic Ocean, and lasted from 3 July to 6 August 1940. After overhaul at La Spezia, Pietro Calvi sailed on 6 October for a second Atlantic patrol reaching Bordeaux, France, on 23 October. The submarine suffered storm damage during its third patrol off the British Isles from 3 to 31 December. The fourth patrol was between the Canary Islands and the Azores from 31 March to 13 May 1941. She sailed on 1 August for a fifth patrol off the Canary Islands. During the sixth patrol from 7 to 29 December Pietro Calvi, Giuseppe Finzi and Enrico Tazzoli rescued sailors of the sunken German commerce raider Atlantis. The seventh patrol was off Brazil from 7 March to 29 April 1942. The submarine sailed on 2 July for its eighth patrol. Pietro Calvi was rammed and sunk on 14 July by the British sloop HMS Lulworth which was able to briefly board the submarine before she sank. British ships rescued 35 of her crew of 78 men; among those killed was the commanding officer, Commander Primo Longobardo.

Ships sunk by Pietro Calvi
Patrol	Date	Ship	Flag	Tonnage	Notes
3rd	20 December 1940	Carlton	(United Kingdom)	5,162 gross register tons (GRT)	freighter from convoy OB 260; 4 survivors from a crew of 35
7th	25 March 1942	Tredinnick	(United Kingdom)	4,589 GRT	freighter, no survivors
7th	1 April 1942	T.C. McCobb	(United States)	7,452 GRT	tanker; 24 killed; first US ship sunk by an Italian submarine
7th	9 April 1942	Eugene V.R. Thayer	(United States)	7,138 GRT	tanker; 11 killed
7th	April 1942	Balkis	(Norway)	2,161 GRT	freighter
7th	April 1942	Ben Brush	(Panama)	7,691 GRT	tanker; 1 killed
Total:				34,193 GRT	
