= K237 =

K237 or K-237 may refer to:

- K-237 (Kansas highway), a state highway in Kansas
- HMCS Halifax (K237), a former Canadian Navy ship
