= Italian submarine Giuseppe Finzi =

Italian submarine, active during WWII

History

Kingdom of Italy
- Name: Giuseppe Finzi
- Builder: Odero-Terni-Orlando, Muggiano, La Spezia
- Laid down: 1 August 1932
- Launched: 29 June 1935
- Commissioned: 8 January 1936
- Captured: by Germany 9 September 1943

Nazi Germany
- Name: UIT-21
- Acquired: 9 September 1943
- Fate: Scuttled 25 August 1944

General characteristics
- Class & type: Calvi-class submarine cruiser
- Displacement: 1,549 t (1,525 long tons) (surfaced); 2,061 t (2,028 long tons) (submerged)
- Length: 84.3 m (276 ft 7 in)
- Beam: 7.7 m (25 ft 3 in)
- Draft: 5.2 m (17 ft 1 in)
- Installed power: 4,400 bhp (3,300 kW) (diesels); 1,800 hp (1,300 kW) (electric motors)
- Propulsion: 2 shafts; diesel-electric; 2 × diesel engines; 2 × electric motors
- Speed: 16.8 knots (31.1 km/h; 19.3 mph) (surfaced); 7.4 knots (13.7 km/h; 8.5 mph) (submerged)
- Range: 11,400 nmi (21,100 km; 13,100 mi) at 8 knots (15 km/h; 9.2 mph) (surfaced); 120 nmi (220 km; 140 mi) at 3 knots (5.6 km/h; 3.5 mph) (submerged)
- Test depth: 90 m (300 ft)
- Crew: 77
- Armament: 8 × 533 mm (21 in) torpedo tubes (4 bow, 4 stern); 2 × single 120 mm (4.7 in) deck guns; 2 × twin 13.2 mm (0.52 in) machine guns

Giuseppe Finzi was one of three Calvi-class submarines built for the Regia Marina (Royal Italian Navy) during the 1930s. Completed in 1936, she played a minor role in the Spanish Civil War of 1936–1939 supporting the Spanish Nationalists. The submarine made multiple patrols in the Atlantic Ocean during the Second World War, sinking five Allied ships. Gisueppe Finzi began conversion into a transport submarine in 1943, but was captured by the Germans in September 1943 before it was completed and redesignated as UIT-21. She was scuttled by them in August 1944 to prevent her capture.

== Design and description ==
The Calvi class was an improved and enlarged version of the preceding Balilla-class submarine cruisers. They displaced 1,549 metric tons (1,525 long tons) surfaced and 2,061 metric tons (2,028 long tons) submerged. The submarines were 84.3 meters (276 ft 7 in) long, had a beam of 7.7 meters (25 ft 3 in) and a draft of 5.2 meters (17 ft 1 in). They had an operational diving depth of 90 meters (300 ft). Their crew numbered 77 officers and enlisted men.

For surface running, the boats were powered by two 2,200-brake-horsepower (1,641 kW) diesel engines, each driving one propeller shaft. When submerged each propeller was driven by a 900-horsepower (671 kW) electric motor. They could reach 16.8 knots (31.1 km/h; 19.3 mph) on the surface and 7.4 knots (13.7 km/h; 8.5 mph) underwater. On the surface, the Calvi class had a range of 11,400 nautical miles (21,100 km; 13,100 mi) at 8 knots (15 km/h; 9.2 mph); submerged, they had a range of 120 nmi (220 km; 140 mi) at 3 knots (5.6 km/h; 3.5 mph).

The boats were armed with eight 53.3-centimeter (21 in) torpedo tubes, four each in the bow and in the stern for which they carried a total of 16 torpedoes. They were also armed with a pair of 120-millimeter (4.7 in) deck guns, one each fore and aft of the conning tower, for combat on the surface. Their anti-aircraft armament consisted of two twin-gun mounts for 13.2-millimeter (0.52 in) machine guns.

== Construction and career ==
Giuseppe Finzi (pennant number FZ) was laid down by Odero-Terni-Orlando (OTO) at their Muggiano, La Spezia shipyard in 1932, launched on 29 June 1935 and completed the following year. While patrolling off Valencia during the Spanish Civil War, the submarine unsuccessfully attacked a Republican Alsedo-class destroyer during a patrol on 15 August – 4 September 1937. During that same patrol she later missed a merchant ship with two torpedoes.

The first patrol during the Second World War was from Cagliari to the Atlantic, and lasted from 5 June to 10 July 1940. The submarine sailed on 7 September 1940 and passed the Strait of Gibraltar on 13 September for an Atlantic patrol to Bordeaux, France, on 29 September. The German Admiral Karl Dönitz visited Giuseppe Finzi on 30 September to welcome Regia Marina sailors to the German base. The third patrol near the British Isles from 24 October to 4 December 1940 revealed that the diesel engine air intake was too exposed for North Atlantic winter weather. The fourth patrol was near the Canary Islands from 10 March to 17 April 1941 and the fifth patrol was off Gibraltar in August. During the sixth patrol from 7 to 29 December 1941 Pietro Calvi, Giuseppe Finzi and Enrico Tazzoli rescued sailors of the sunken German commerce raider Atlantis. The submarine sailed for Operation Neuland on 6 February 1942 and returned on 31 March. She returned to the Caribbean Sea for an eighth patrol from 6 June to 18 August 1942. On 26 November 1942 Giuseppe Finzi sailed for a ninth patrol to Brazil; but mechanical problems required return to base on 10 December. The boat patrolled the West African coast from 11 February to 18 April 1943. Conversion to a transport submarine was never completed and the boat was seized by the Germans on 9 September 1943 when Italy surrendered to the Allies. Renamed UIT21 in German service, she was scuttled at Le Verdon-sur-Mer on 25 August 1944 to prevent her capture by advancing Allied forces.

=== Ships sunk ===
Ships sunk by Giuseppe Finzi
Patrol	Date	Ship	Flag	Tonnage	Notes
7th	6 March 1942	Melpomese	(United Kingdom)	7,011 GRT	tanker, no casualties
7th	6 March 1942	Boren	(Sweden)	4,528 GRT	freighter; no casualties
7th	10 March 1942	Charles Racine	(Norway)	9,957 GRT	tanker; no casualties
10th	28 March 1943	Granicos	(Greece)	3,689 GRT	iron ore freighter sank in less than 30 seconds, one survivor from a crew of 31
10th	29 March 1943	Celtic Star	(United Kingdom)	5,575 GRT	freighter, 2 killed
Total:				30,760 GRT	
