= Bombardment of Curaçao =

1942 German naval bombardment

- Part of the Battle of the Caribbean in WW2
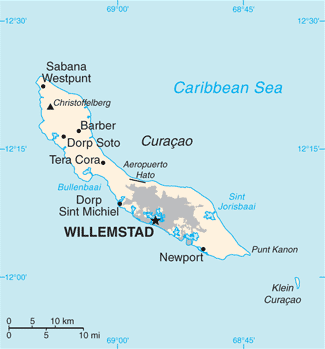
- Curaçao, the oil farm was located on the coast west of Willemstad.
Date	19 April 1942
Location	near Willemstad, Curaçao, Dutch Antilles, Caribbean Sea, Atlantic Ocean
Result	Dutch victory

Belligerents
Netherlands	Germany

Commanders and leaders
Unknown	(Nazi Germany) Ernst Kals

Strength
10 soldiers 2 naval guns 1 shore battery	1 U-boat

Casualties and losses
none	none

The bombardment of Curaçao was a 1942 German naval bombardment of a Bullen Baai Company petroleum storage facility on the Dutch Caribbean island of Curaçao during World War II. The raid's purpose was to ignite and destroy the petroleum held on Curaçao. This attempt failed, and the German U-boat responsible was unsuccessfully engaged by a Dutch shore battery before escaping.

== Background ==
On 16 February 1942, the Kriegsmarine Kapitänleutnant Werner Hartenstein devised a coordinated submarine attack against Caribbean targets including the Dutch island of Aruba. The Attack on Aruba turned out to be somewhat successful, the Germans sank or damaged several oil tankers but did not set ablaze the large oil tank on Aruba. Hoping to further disrupt a major Allied oil supply, Hartenstein ordered his U-boats to continue operating against the Aruba and Curaçao refineries.

== Bombardment ==
U-130, a German Type IXC submarine under Kapitän zur See Ernst Kals, approached western Curaçao on 19 April 1942. Its objective was to bombard and damage the Bullen Baai tank farm, located several miles west of Willemstad. At about 02:15, Kals ordered his gunners to take up U-130's 10.5 cm (4.13 in) deck gun and then he ordered them to fire. In the short engagement, the Germans fired at least five 10.5 cm (4.13 in) shells at the petroleum tanks. None hit their target but the sound of the explosions woke up the sleeping Dutch coastal artillery detachment on the island. They rushed to their two 120 mm (4.7 in) naval gun battery that protected the tanks and opened fire. The Dutch let loose only one shot at the German boat which alarmed them but missed. Captain Kals decided to abort the operation and ordered his crew to submerge the U-boat, they then escaped. There was no damage to the petroleum farm along with no casualties sustained by either side that morning.

== Aftermath ==
Though only a small skirmish the German bombardment of Curaçao is remembered as a key event in the Battle of the Caribbean. In August 1942, the Germans returned to Curaçao, attacked a tanker, and then received fire from a Dutch shore battery before slipping away.

== See also ==
- Bombardment of Ellwood
- Attacks on North America during World War II

== Bibliography ==
- Woodman, Richard. The Real Cruel Sea; The Merchant Navy in the Battle of the Atlantic, 1939–1943 (2004) ISBN 0-7195-6403-4
