= SS George Calvert (1942) =

World War II Liberty ship of the United States

History

United States
- Name: George Calvert
- Namesake: George Calvert
- Owner: War Shipping Administration (WSA)
- Operator: A.H. Bull & Co., Inc.
- Ordered: as type (EC2-S-C1) hull, MCE hull 29
- Awarded: 14 March 1941
- Builder: Bethlehem-Fairfield Shipyard, Baltimore, Maryland
- Cost: $1,172,827
- Yard number: 2016
- Way number: 3
- Laid down: 19 November 1941
- Launched: 14 March 1942
- Sponsored by: Mrs. William C. Sealey
- Completed: 30 April 1942
- Fate: Torpedoed and sunk, 20 May 1942

General characteristics
- Class & type: Liberty ship; type EC2-S-C1, standard
- Tonnage: 10,865 LT DWT; 7,176 GRT
- Displacement: 3,380 long tons (3,434 t) (light); 14,245 long tons (14,474 t) (max)
- Length: 441 feet 6 inches (135 m) oa; 416 feet (127 m) pp; 427 feet (130 m) lwl
- Beam: 57 feet (17 m)
- Draft: 27 ft 9.25 in (8.4646 m)
- Installed power: 2 × Oil fired 450 °F (232 °C) boilers, operating at 220 psi (1,500 kPa); 2,500 hp (1,900 kW)
- Propulsion: 1 × triple-expansion steam engine, (manufactured by Worthington Pump & Machinery Corp, Harrison, New Jersey); 1 × screw propeller
- Speed: 11.5 knots (21.3 km/h; 13.2 mph)
- Capacity: 562,608 cubic feet (15,931 m^{3}) (grain); 499,573 cubic feet (14,146 m^{3}) (bale)
- Complement: 38–62 USMM; 21–40 USNAG
- Armament: Varied by ship; Bow-mounted 3-inch (76 mm)/50-caliber gun; Stern-mounted 4-inch (102 mm)/50-caliber gun; 2–8 × single 20-millimeter (0.79 in) Oerlikon anti-aircraft (AA) cannons and/or, 2–8 × 37-millimeter (1.46 in) M1 AA guns

Note: The USAS American Mariner, originally entered service as SS George Calvert (build number 2007/MC Hull 20) and launched in 1941 should not be confused with SS George Calvert (build number 2016/MC Hull 29) which was launched in 1942.

SS George Calvert was a Liberty ship built in the United States during World War II. She was named after George Calvert, an English politician and colonizer. Calvert took an interest in the British colonization of the Americas, becoming the proprietor of the Province of Avalon, the first sustained English settlement on the southeastern peninsula on the island of Newfoundland. He later sought a new royal charter to settle the region, which would become the state of Maryland.

== Ship name ==
USAS American Mariner, originally launched as SS George Calvert (build number 2007/MC Hull 20), should not be confused with this SS George Calvert (build number 2016/MC Hull 29) which was constructed shortly thereafter.

Hull number 20 was reportedly set aside after launch due to structural problems during assembly. As a result, hull number 29 was given her name. Hull number 29 was sunk in May 1942, and, as a result, when hull number 20 was turned over as "ready-for-issue" to the War Shipping Administration in 1943, there was no reason to change her name since hull number 29 no longer existed.

== Construction ==
George Calvert was laid down on 19 November 1941, under a Maritime Commission (MARCOM) contract, MCE hull 29, by the Bethlehem-Fairfield Shipyard, Baltimore, Maryland; she was sponsored by Mrs. William C. Sealey, the daughter of L.R. Sanford, the chief of the inspection section at Bethlehem-Fairfield Shipyard, and was launched on 14 March 1942.

== History ==
She was allocated to A.H. Bull & Co., Inc., on 30 April 1942.

=== Sinking ===
George Calvert had set out from Baltimore, in May 1942, on her maiden voyage, for Bandar Shahpur, with 9,116 LT (9,262 t) of general cargo. After leaving a convoy around 11 mi (18 km) off the Dry Tortugas, she was about 50 mi (80 km) northwest of Cuba, proceeding at 11 kn (20 km/h; 13 mph) in a zigzag course. At 19:08, in the evening of 20 May 1942, George Calvert was struck by two torpedoes fired from the German submarine U-753, at 22°55′N 84°26′W. The first torpedo struck five–six ft (1.5–1.8 m) below the waterline in the #3 hold, while the second set off the magazine, blowing off the stern-mounted 4-inch (102 mm)/50 caliber gun, and killing three Armed guards, when it struck 20 ft (6.1 m) forward of the stern. The remaining crew of eight officers, 33 crewmen, and 10 Armed guards abandoned the sinking ship in three lifeboats. U-753 launched at least one more torpedo at 20:03, which struck George Calvert amidship, braking the ship in half and causing her to sink immediately. The survivors were later questioned by U-753 about the ships name, tonnage, and cargo. They landed at Dimas, Cuba, on 21 May 1942.

== See also ==
- USAS American Mariner
- Battle of the Caribbean

== Bibliography ==
- "Bethlehem-Fairfield, Baltimore MD". www.ShipbuildingHistory.com. 14 August 2008.
- Maritime Administration. "Richard Bland". Ship History Database Vessel Status Card. U.S. Department of Transportation, Maritime Administration.
- Davies, James (May 2004). "Specifications (As-Built)" (PDF). p. 23.
- "SS George Calvert".
- "George Calvert".
