= Operation Neuland =

Naval operation during the Second World War

- Part of the Atlantic Campaign of World War II
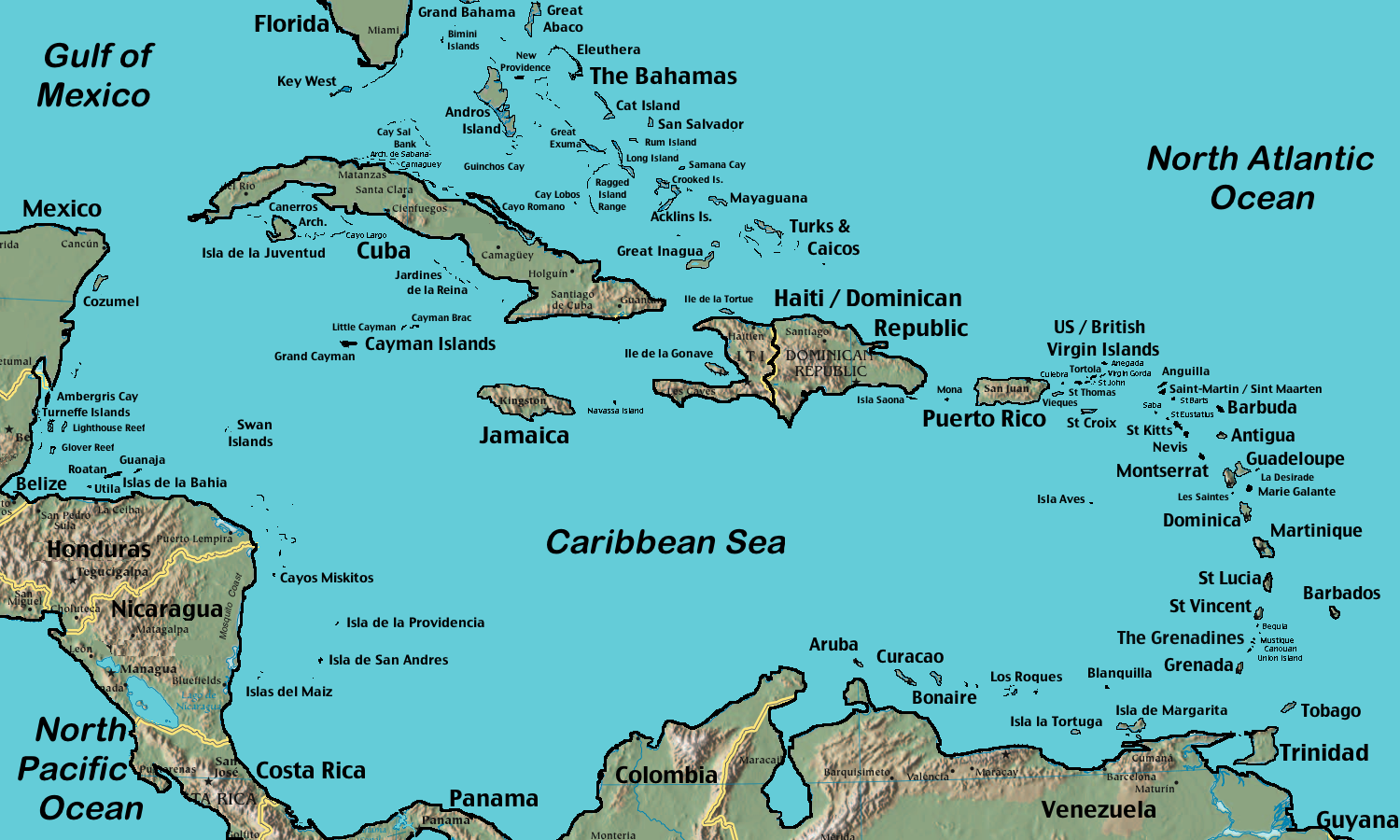
Date	16 February – late March 1942
Location	Caribbean Sea
Result	Axis victory

Belligerents
Germany; Italy	United States; United Kingdom; Netherlands

Commanders and leaders
Karl Dönitz; Romolo Polacchini	John H. Hoover

Strength
11 submarines	USS Barney; USS Blakeley; USS Lapwing

Casualties and losses
Casualties; 1 killed; 1 wounded; Losses; 1 submarine damaged	Losses; 45 cargo ships sunk; 1 lighthouse tender sunk; 10 cargo ships damaged

Operation Neuland was the code name of the Kriegsmarine extension of unrestricted submarine warfare into the Caribbean Sea during World War II. German U-boats demonstrated range to disrupt British petroleum supplies and American aluminum supplies which had not been anticipated by Allied pre-war planning. Although the area remained vulnerable to submarines for several months, U-boats never again enjoyed the opportunities for success resulting from the surprise of this operation.

== Background ==
The Caribbean was strategically significant because of Venezuelan oil fields in the southeast and the Panama Canal in the southwest. The Royal Dutch Shell oil refinery on Dutch-owned Curaçao, processing eleven million barrels per month, was the largest in the world; the refinery at Pointe-à-Pierre on Trinidad was the largest in the British Empire; and there was Lago Oil and Transport Company, another large refinery on Dutch-owned Aruba where Shell operated the Eagle refinery of Oranjestad. The British Isles required four oil tankers of petroleum daily during the early war years, and most of it came from Venezuela, through Curaçao, after Italy blocked passage through the Mediterranean Sea from the Middle East.

The Caribbean held additional strategic significance to the United States. The southern United States Gulf of Mexico coastline, including petroleum facilities and Mississippi River trade, could be defended at two points. The United States was well positioned to defend the Straits of Florida but was less able to prevent access from the Caribbean through the Yucatán Channel. Bauxite was the preferred ore for aluminum, and one of the few strategic raw materials not available within the continental United States. United States military aircraft production depended upon bauxite imported from the Guianas along shipping routes paralleling the Lesser Antilles.

United States Navy VP-51 Consolidated PBY Catalinas began neutrality patrols along the Lesser Antillies from San Juan, Puerto Rico, on 13 September 1939. The United Kingdom had established military bases on Trinidad; and British troops occupied Aruba, Curaçao and Bonaire soon after the Netherlands were captured by Nazi Germany. The French island of Martinique was perceived as a possible base for Axis ships as British relationships with Vichy France deteriorated following the Second Armistice at Compiègne. The September 1940 Destroyers for Bases Agreement enabled the United States to build bases in British Guiana, and on the islands of Great Exuma, Jamaica, Antigua, Saint Lucia and Trinidad.

== Concept ==
Declaration of war on 8 December 1941 removed United States neutrality assertions which had previously protected trade shipping in the Western Atlantic. The relatively ineffective anti-submarine warfare (ASW) measures along the United States Atlantic coast observed by U-boats participating in Operation Paukenschlag encouraged utilizing the range of German Type IX submarines to explore conditions in what had previously been the southern portion of a declared Pan American neutrality zone. A 15 January 1942 meeting in Lorient included former Hamburg America Line captains with Caribbean experience to brief commanding officers of U-156, U-67, U-502, U-161 and U-129 about conditions in the area. The first three U-boats sailed on 19 January with orders to simultaneously attack Dutch refinery facilities on 16 February. U-161 sailed on 24 January to attack Trinidad, and U-129 followed on 26 January. U-126 sailed on 2 February to patrol the Windward Passage between Cuba and Hispaniola; and five large Italian submarines sailed from Bordeaux to patrol the Atlantic side of the Lesser Antilles. These eleven submarines would patrol independently to disperse Allied ASW resources until exhaustion of food, fuel or torpedoes required them to return to France.

== Implementation ==
=== U-156 ===
The second patrol of U-156 was under the command of Werner Hartenstein. On the evening of 15 February, U-156 surfaced after nightfall, two miles off Aruba. Hartenstein commenced his attack at 0131 on 16 February, when he fired two torpedoes at the tankers SS Pedernales and SS Oranjestad lying at anchor outside San Nicolaas. Ten minutes later, U-156 moved to within 3/4 mile of the Lago refinery and prepared to bombard it with her 10.5 cm deck gun. However, a crewman failed to remove the tampion from the muzzle, and the first shell detonated in the barrel. One gunner was killed, another was seriously injured, and the muzzle of the gun barrel was splayed open. Following the attack, U-156 sailed past Oranjestad, 14 miles to the west, and fired three torpedoes at the Shell tanker Arkansas berthed at the Eagle pier. One struck the ship, causing minor damage, one missed its mark and disappeared in the water, and the third beached itself. On February 17, four Dutch marines were killed as they attempted to disarm the beached torpedo. Hartenstein kept U-156 submerged north of Aruba after daybreak. At nightfall the crew buried the sailor who died when the gun exploded, and the captain received permission to sail to Martinique, where the injured crewman was put ashore. The crew used hacksaws to shorten the damaged gun barrel by 40 centimeters, and used the sawed-off gun to sink two ships encountered after all torpedoes had been expended sinking two other ships. U-156 started home on 28 February 1942.

Cruise of U-156
Date	Ship	Flag	GRT	Notes
16 February 1942	Pedernales	United Kingdom	4,317	Tanker torpedoed outside San Nicolaas harbor, but later repaired
16 February 1942	Oranjestad	United Kingdom	2,396	Tanker torpedoed outside San Nicolaas harbor, and capsized in 48 seconds
16 February 1942	Arkansas	United States	6,452	Tanker torpedoed at Eagle Pier near Oranjestad but later repaired
20 February 1942	Delplata	United States	5,127	Freighter torpedoed at 14°45′N 62°10′W
25 February 1942	La Carriere	United Kingdom	5,685	Tanker
27 February 1942	Macgregor	United Kingdom	2,498	Freighter sunk by gunfire
28 February 1942	Oregon	United States	7,017	6 crewman killed aboard tanker sunk by gunfire at 20°44′N 67°52′W

=== U-67 ===
The third patrol of U-67 was under the command of Günther Müller-Stöckheim. In coordination with the attack on Aruba U-67 moved into Curaçao's Willemstad harbor shortly after midnight on 16 February to launch six torpedoes at three anchored tankers. The four bow torpedoes hit, but failed to explode. The two torpedoes from the stern tubes were effective on the third tanker.

Cruise of U-67
Date	Ship	Flag	GRT	Notes
16 February 1942	Rafaela	Netherlands	3,177	Tanker torpedoed in Willemstad harbor, but later repaired
21 February 1942	Kongsgaard	Norway	9,467	Tanker
14 March 1942	Penelope	Panama	8,436	Tanker

=== U-502 ===
The third patrol of U-502 was under the command of Jürgen von Rosensteil. In coordination with the attacks on Aruba and Willemstad, U-502 waited to ambush shallow draft Lake Maracaibo crude oil tankers en route to the refineries. After three tankers were reported missing, the Chinese crews of surviving tankers refused to sail; and Associated Press broadcast a report that tanker traffic had been halted in the area. U-502 moved north and started home via the Windward Passage after launching its last torpedoes on 23 February.

Cruise of U-502
Date	Ship	Flag	GRT	Notes
16 February 1942	Tia Juana	United Kingdom	2,395	Shallow-draught 'Lake Maracaibo' crude oil tanker
16 February 1942	Monagas	Venezuela	2,650	Shallow-draught 'Lake Maracaibo' crude oil tanker
16 February 1942	San Nicholas	United Kingdom	2,391	Shallow-draught 'Lake Maracaibo' crude oil tanker
22 February 1942	J.N.Pew	United States	9,033	Tanker torpedoed at 12°40′N 74°00′W,33 killed; 3 survivors
23 February 1942	Thallia	Panama	8,329	Tanker
23 February 1942	Sun	United States	9,002	Tanker damaged by torpedo at 13°02′N 70°41′W

=== U-161 ===
The second patrol of U-161 was under the command of Albrecht Achilles. Achilles and his first watch officer Bender had both visited Trinidad while employed by Hamburg America Line before the war. U-161 entered Trinidad's Gulf of Paria harbor at periscope depth during daylight through a deep, narrow passage or Boca. An electronic submarine detection system registered its passage at 0930 on 18 February 1942, but the signal was dismissed as caused by a patrol boat. After spending the day resting on the bottom of the harbor, U-161 surfaced after dark to torpedo two anchored ships. U-161 then left the gulf with decks awash and running lights illuminated to resemble one of the harbor small craft; and then moved off to the northwest before returning to sink a ship outside the Boca. After sunset on 10 March 1942 U-161 silently entered the shallow, narrow entrance of Castries harbor surfaced on electric motors to torpedo two freighters at dockside; and then raced out under fire from machine guns. The two freighters had just arrived with supplies to construct the new US base; and the harbor previously considered immune to submarine attack was later fitted with an anti-submarine net. U-161 started home on 11 March 1942.

Cruise of U-161
Date	Ship	Flag	GRT	Notes
19 February 1942	British Consul	United Kingdom	6,940	Tanker torpedoed in Gulf of Paria, but later repaired
19 February 1942	Mokihana	United States	7,460	Torpedoed in Gulf of Paria, but later repaired
21 February 1942	Circe Shell	United Kingdom	8,207	Tanker
23 February 1942	Lihue	United States	7,001	Torpedoed at 14°30′N 64°45′W
7 March 1942	Uniwaleco	South Africa	9,755	Whale Factory ship used as a fuel oil carrier
10 March 1942	Lady Nelson	Canada	7,970	Torpedoed in Castries harbor, later repaired
10 March 1942	Umtata	United Kingdom	8,141	Torpedoed in Castries harbor, but later repaired
14 March 1942	Sarniadoc	Canada	1,940	Torpedoed, exploded 21†
15 March 1942	Acacia	United States Navy	1,130	USCG lighthouse tender sunk by gunfire south of Haiti

=== Luigi Torelli ===
Luigi Torelli under the command of Antonio de Giacomo sank two ships.

Cruise of Luigi Torelli
Date	Ship	Flag	GRT	Notes
19 February	Scottish Star	(United Kingdom)	7,300	freighter
25 February	Esso Copenhagen	(Panama)	9,200	tanker

=== U-129 ===
Under the command of Nicolai Clausen U-129 spent its fourth patrol intercepting bauxite freighters southeast of Trinidad. The unexpected sinkings caused a temporary halt to merchant ship sailings. The Allies broadcast suggested routes for unescorted merchant ships to follow when sailings resumed. The U-boats received the broadcast and were waiting at the suggested locations.

Cruise of U-129
Date	Ship	Flag	GRT	Notes
20 February	Nordvangen	(Norway)	2,400	Bauxite freighter sunk with no survivors
23 February	George L. Torian	(Canada)	1,754	Bauxite freighter
23 February	West Zeda	(United States)	5,658	no casualties aboard freighter torpedoed at 09°13′N 69°04′W
23 February	Lennox	(Canada)	1,904	Bauxite freighter
28 February	Bayou	(Panama)	2,605	Manganese freighter
3 March	Mary	(United States)	5,104	Freighter torpedoed at 08°25′N 52°50′W
7 March	Steel Age	(United States)	6,188	33 killed;sole survivor taken captive from freighter torpedoed at 06°45′N 53°15′W

=== Leonardo da Vinci ===
Leonardo da Vinci under the command of Luigi Longanesi-Cattani sank one Allied ship.

Cruise of Leonardo da Vinci
Date	Ship	Flag	GRT	Notes
28 February	Everasma	(Latvia)	3,644	freighter torpedoed at 16°00′N 49°00′W

=== U-126 ===
U-126 patrolled the Windward Passage under the command of Ernst Bauer.

Cruise of U-126
Date	Ship	Flag	GRT	Notes
2 March	Gunny	(Norway)	2,362	freighter
5 March	Mariana	(United States)	3,110	no survivors from freighter torpedoed at 22°14′N 71°23′W [36 lost]
7 March	Barbara	(United States)	4,637	freighter torpedoed at 20°00′N 73°56′W
7 March	Cardonia	(United States)	5,104	freighter torpedoed at 19°53′N 73°27′W
8 March	Esso Bolivar	(Panama)	10,389	tanker damaged by torpedoes within sight of Guantánamo
9 March	Hanseat	(Panama)	8,241	tanker
12 March	Texan	(United States)	7,005	freighter torpedoed at 21°32′N 76°24′W
12 March	Olga	(United States)	2,496	freighter torpedoed at 23°39′N 77°00′W
13 March	Colabee	(United States)	5,518	freighter damaged by torpedoes at 22°14′N 77°35′W

=== Enrico Tazzoli ===
The large 1,331-ton Enrico Tazzoli under the command of Carlo Fecia di Cossato sank six ships.

Cruise of Enrico Tazzoli
Date	Ship	Flag	GRT	Notes
6 March	Astrea	(Netherlands)	1,406	freighter
6 March	Tonsbergfjord	(Norway)	3,156	freighter torpedoed at 31°22′N 68°05′W with 1 killed
8 March	Montevideo	(Uruguay)	5,785	freighter torpedoed at 29°13′N 69°35′W with 14 killed
10 March	Cygnet	(Greece)	3,628	freighter torpedoed at 24°05′N 74°20′W with no casualties
13 March	Daytonian	(United Kingdom)	6,434	freighter torpedoed at 26°33′N 74°43′W with 1 killed
15 March	Athelqueen	(United Kingdom)	8,780	tanker torpedoed at 26°50′N 75°40′W with 3 killed

=== Giuseppe Finzi ===
The large 1,331-ton Giuseppe Finzi under the command of Ugo Giudice sank three ships.

Cruise of Giuseppe Finzi
Date	Ship	Flag	GRT	Notes
7 March	Melpomene	(United Kingdom)	7,000	tanker
7 March	Skåne	(Sweden)	4,500	freighter
10 March	Charles Racine	(Norway)	10,000	Tanker torpedoed with no casualties

=== Morosini ===
The Marcello-class submarine Morosini under the command of Athos Fraternale sank three ships.

Cruise of Morosini
Date	Ship	Flag	GRT	Notes
12 March	Stangarth	(United Kingdom)	5,966	freighter torpedoed at 22°45′N 57°40′W
15 March	Oscilla	(Netherlands)	6,341	tanker torpedoed with 4 killed
23 March	Peder Bogen	(United Kingdom)	9,741	tanker torpedoed at 24°53′N 57°30′W with no casualties

== Aftermath ==
The Aruba refinery was within deck gun range of deep water. Grand Admiral Erich Raeder would have preferred shelling the refinery as the opening action of Operation Neuland. On the basis of experience with the relative damage caused by deck guns in comparison to torpedoes, U-boat officers chose to begin by torpedoing tankers to cause large fires of spreading oil. Results of the initial Attack on Aruba and the Bombardment of Curaçao were diminished by weapon failures; subsequent attempts to shell the Aruba refinery were discouraged by defensive fire from larger numbers of larger caliber coastal artillery and patrols by alerted aircraft and submarine chasers.

An important link in petroleum product transport from Venezuelan oil fields was a fleet of small tankers designed to reach the wells in shallow Lake Maracaibo and transport crude oil to the refineries. Approximately ten percent of these tankers were destroyed on the first day of Operation Neuland. Surviving tankers were temporarily immobilized when their crews mutinied and refused to sail without ASW escort. Refinery output declined while the mutineers were jailed until sailings could resume.

Torpedoing ships within defended harbors was relatively unusual through the battle of the Atlantic. U-boats more commonly deployed mines to permit a stealthy exit. Although results were perceived as less significant, the difficulty of attacks in the Gulf of Paria and Castries by U-161 was comparable to Günther Prien's penetration of Scapa Flow.

Patrol of the Windward Passage by U-126 was well timed to exploit dispersion of ASW forces north and south. U-126 sank some ships within sight of Guantanamo Bay Naval Base.

Neuland and Paukenschlag were opened with similar numbers of U-boats; but the effectiveness of Neuland was enhanced by coordination with Italian submarines. The level of success by Italian submarines against a concentration of undefended ships sailing independently was seldom repeated and marked a high point of effective Axis cooperation in the battle of the Atlantic.

== See also ==
- Bombardment of Curaçao
- Attack on Aruba

== Sources ==
- Blair, Clay Hitler's U-Boat War: The Hunters 1939–1942 Random House (1996) ISBN 0-394-58839-8
- Cressman, Robert J. The Official Chronology of the U.S.Navy in World War II Naval Institute Press (2000) ISBN 1-55750-149-1
- Kafka, Roger & Pepperburg, Roy L. Warships of the World Cornell Maritime Press (1946)
- Kelshall, Gaylord T.M. The U-Boat War in the Caribbean United States Naval Institute Press (1994) ISBN 1-55750-452-0
- Morison, Samuel Eliot, History of United States Naval Operations in World War II (volume I) The Battle of the Atlantic September 1939 – May 1943 Little, Brown and Company (1975)
