= Ernst Kals =

German navy officer (1905–1979)

- Ernst Kals
- Born: 2 August 1905; Glauchau, Saxony, German Empire
- Died: 2 November 1979 (aged 74); Emden, West Germany
- Military career
- Allegiance: Weimar Republic (1924-1933); Nazi Germany (1933-1945)
- Branch: Reichsmarine; Kriegsmarine
- Service years: 1924–45
- Rank: Kapitän zur See
- Units: Braunschweig; SSS Niobe; Berlin; Schlesien; torpedo boat Luchs; cruiser Köln; cruiser Emden; cruiser Admiral Scheer; cruiser Leipzig; U-37
- Commands: U-130; 2nd U-boat Flotilla
- Conflicts: World War II Battle of the Atlantic Battle of the Caribbean Operation Torch Bombardment of Curaçao Battle of Casablanca
- Awards: Knight's Cross of the Iron Cross

Ernst Kals (2 August 1905 – 2 November 1979) was a Kapitän zur See with the Kriegsmarine during World War II. He commanded the Type IXC U-boat U-130 on five patrols. He was awarded the Knight's Cross of the Iron Cross.

== Career ==
Kals joined the Reichsmarine in 1924. In October 1940, after a period of service on torpedo boats and light cruisers, he transferred to the Ubootwaffe ("U-boat force"). After one patrol on U-37 under the command of Nicolai Clausen as commander in training, he took command of U-130 in June 1941. He was awarded the Knight's Cross in September 1941.

In April 1942, Kals, in U-130, bombarded the Allied petroleum tank farm on Curaçao, in the Netherlands Antilles. He went on to sink a total of 20 ships on five patrols, for a total of 145,656 tons of Allied shipping. In five minutes he sank three United States troopships, the Edward Rutledge, Hugh L. Scott and Tasker H. Bliss.

In January 1943 Kals became commander of the 2nd U-boat Flotilla, based in Lorient, France. Promoted to Kapitän zur See in September 1944, he remained in this position until the end of the war.

== Later life ==
Kals was held in French captivity from May 1945 to January 1948. He died at Emden in 1979 at the age of 74.

== Awards ==
- Iron Cross (1939) 2nd Class (18 December 1939) & 1st Class (18 December 1941)
- U-boat War Badge (1939) (18 December 1941)
- Knight's Cross of the Iron Cross on 1 September 1942 as Korvettenkapitän and commander of U-130
- War Merit Cross 2nd Class with Swords (30 January 1944)

Military offices
Preceded by Korvettenkapitän Viktor Schütze	Commander of 2nd U-boat Flotilla; January, 1943 – October, 1944	Succeeded by disbanded
