= Hal Lawrence =

Canadian naval officer and author

Harold Ernest Thomas Lawrence
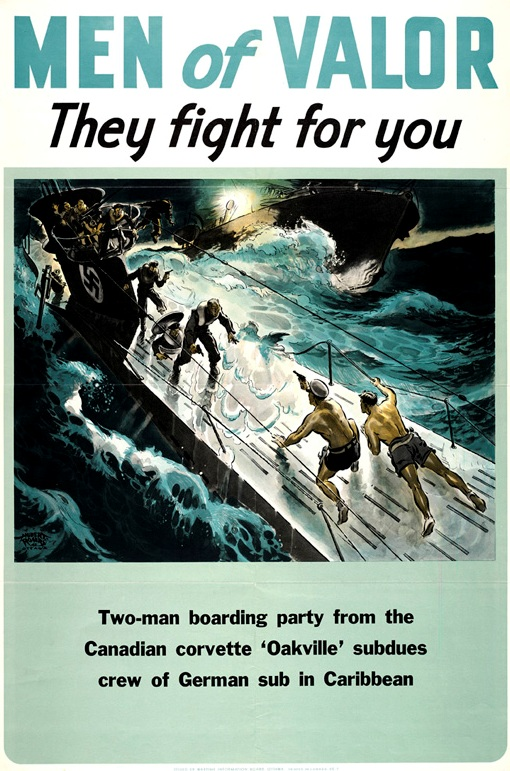
- Born: 1920; Chatham, England
- Died: 11 April 1994; Victoria, British Columbia
- Military career
- Allegiance: Canada
- Branch: Royal Canadian Navy
- Service years: 1939–1965
- Rank: Commander
- Nickname: Hal
- Units: HMS Alaunia; HMCS Moosejaw; HMCS Oakville; HMCS Sioux
- Commands: 11th Escort Squadron
- Conflicts: World War II: Battle of the Atlantic; Convoy SC 42; Convoy TAW 15
- Awards: Distinguished Service Cross

Harold Ernest Thomas Lawrence (1920–1994) was a Canadian naval officer and author. He was born in the Corps of Royal Engineers barracks at Chatham, England; and moved to Halifax, Nova Scotia.

== Career ==
Lawrence entered the Royal Canadian Naval Volunteer Reserve as a midshipman in 1939, and was promoted to Sub-lieutenant while serving aboard the Armed Merchant Cruiser HMS Alaunia. He received Mention in Dispatches for service aboard HMCS Moosejaw during the battle of Convoy SC 42. He was awarded the Distinguished Service Cross for leading HMCS Oakville's boarding party onto the sinking U-94 during the battle of convoy TAW-15. The citation reads:

"Lieutenant Lawrence was in charge of a boarding party of two which attempted to prevent the scuttling of a U-boat. With complete disregard for his own safety, the Officer, accompanied by a Petty Officer, boarded the U-boat and, having subdued the enemy crew, he took action in an endeavor to prevent the scuttling of the U-boat, notwithstanding the fact that it was then sinking. His spirited and determined conduct was worthy of the highest traditions of the Royal Canadian Navy."

Lawrence was subsequently promoted to lieutenant and executive officer of HMCS Oakville. Lawrence was next assigned as gunnery officer in the commissioning crew of HMCS Sioux. He was transferred from the volunteer reserve to the Royal Canadian Navy in 1945 and became executive officer of HMCS Sioux. He received a master's degree from the University of Ottawa before retiring from the Navy in 1965.

== Retirement ==
Lawrence taught at the University of Ottawa and the University of Victoria after retiring from the Navy. He wrote three books concerning World War II. A Bloody War was published in 1979, Tales of the North Atlantic in 1985, and Victory at Sea in 1989. He died in Victoria, British Columbia, in 1994. The University of Victoria maintains the Hal Lawrence fonds of 120 taped interviews with historical photographs and maps. He donated his personal library to the Naval Officer Training Centre at Esquimalt, B.C. where the books are housed as the Hal Lawrence Library.
