= USCGC Chelan =

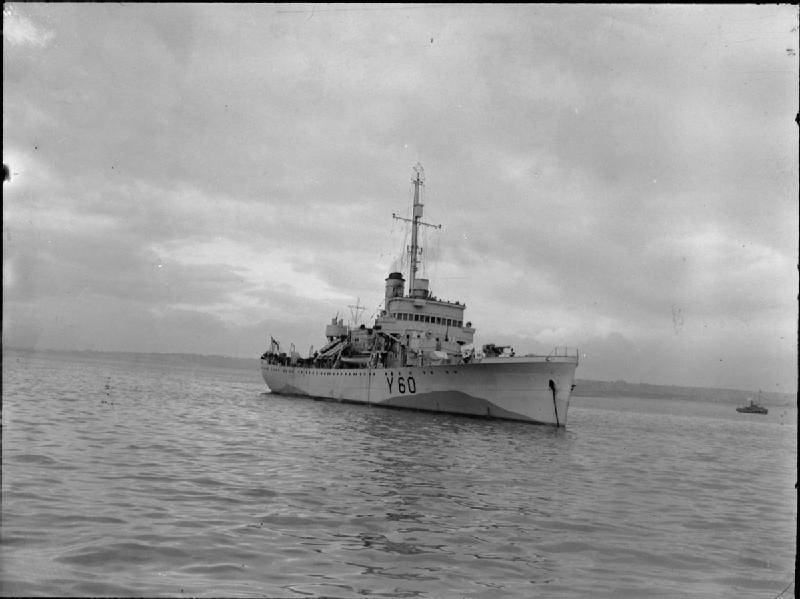
- HMS Lulworth during the second world war

History

United States
- Name: USCGC Chelan
- Namesake: Lake Chelan in Washington
- Builder: Bethlehem Shipbuilding Corporation, Quincy, Massachusetts
- Laid down: 14 November 1927
- Launched: 19 May 1928
- Commissioned: 5 September 1928
- Fate: Transferred to Royal Navy 2 May 1941
- Acquired: From Royal Navy 12 February 1946
- Fate: Sold 23 October 1947

United Kingdom
- Name: HMS Lulworth
- Acquired: 2 May 1941
- Commissioned: 2 May 1941
- Identification: Pennant number Y60
- Fate: Transferred to U.S. Coast Guard 12 February 1946

General characteristics
- Class & type: Lake-class cutter (USCG); Banff-class sloop (RN)
- Displacement: 2,075 long tons (2,108 t)
- Length: 250 ft (76 m)
- Beam: 42 ft (13 m)
- Draft: 12 ft 11 in (3.94 m)
- Propulsion: 1 × General Electric turbine-driven 3,350 shp (2,500 kW) electric motor, 2 boilers
- Speed: 14.8 kn (27.4 km/h; 17.0 mph) cruising; 17.5 kn (32.4 km/h; 20.1 mph) maximum
- Complement: 97
- Armament: 1 × 5 inch gun; 1 × 3 inch gun; 2 × 6-pounder (57 mm)

USCGC Chelan was a Lake-class cutter belonging to the United States Coast Guard launched on 19 May 1928 and commissioned on 5 September 1928 . After 13 years of service to the Coast Guard, she was transferred to the Royal Navy as part of the Lend-Lease Act, and named HMS Lulworth (Y60) . During the war Lulworth served in a convoy Escort Group for Western Approaches Command

She returned to the U.S. Coast Guard after World War II.

== Construction and commissioning ==
Chelan was laid down by Bethlehem Shipbuilding Corporation at Quincy, Massachusetts, on 14 November 1927 and launched on 19 May 1928. She was commissioned into U.S. Coast Guard service as USCGC Chelan on 5 November 1928.

== Career ==
=== U.S. Coast Guard - Chelan (pre-war) ===
After commissioning, Chelan was homeported at Seattle, Washington, and assigned to the Bering Sea Patrol. After wintering at Seattle during 1928–1929, she departed for her first Bering Sea patrol on 17 April 1929. She continued these patrols on an annual basis, spending winters at Seattle.

In 1931, Chelan was at Squaw Harbor in the Territory of Alaska when she received word that the captain of the 21-Gross register ton motor vessel Gladiator had arrived at a lighthouse and reported that his vessel had drifted ashore and been wrecked on the coast of Unimak Island in the Aleutian Islands 20 nautical miles (37 km; 23 mi) northeast of Cape Sarichef (58°24′20″N 157°31′15″W) on 22 September after her steering gear broke in a gale during a voyage from Nome, Territory of Alaska, to Seattle with a crew of three and a 7-ton cargo of oil, Alaska curios, and other items aboard. Chelan steamed to the lighthouse, picked up Gladiator′s captain, then proceeded to the wreck site. Chelan′s lifeboat was wrecked in harsh weather conditions while trying to rescue Gladiator′s other two crewmen from the beach, but Gladiator′s crew and that of the lifeboat all reached shore safely and hiked to the lighthouse, where Chelan picked them up. Chelan transported Gladiator′s crew, one of whom was critically ill, to Seattle, where the ill man recovered after receiving medical treatment.

On 8 July 1936, Chelan departed on a special cruise with a Congressional party aboard. She transferred the Congressional party to the cutter USCGC Shoshone on 1 August 1936.

On 22 January 1937, Chelan was assigned a new home port at Boston, Massachusetts, and she began patrols in the North Atlantic Ocean in 1937. On 22 March 1937, she responded to a distress call from the 1,600-gross register ton Norwegian steamer SS Bjerkli in a gale. She took aboard 16 officers and crew from Bjerkli on 23 March 1937 and transported them 660 nautical miles (1,220 km; 760 mi) to Boston.

On 9 March 1939, Chelan was assigned to inaugurate the International Ice Observation Service in the North Atlantic for 1939. On 3 January 1940, she was assigned to operate as part of the International Ice Patrol during 1940.

=== Royal Navy - Lulworth (World War II) ===
Under the Lend-Lease Act, Chelan was transferred to the Royal Navy on 2 May 1941, (Note: Mason gives 12 May) and the British commissioned her into naval service the same day. Rated as a sloop-of-war, she served in the Royal Navy with the name HMS Lulworth (Y60).

She crossed the Atlantic to the Clyde, her crew partyly drawn from the battleship HMS Resolution, then underwent repair in Cardiff including fitting out for RN service as a convoy escort. In July 1941 she joined Western Approaches Command with her base in Londonderry Port, Northern Ireland. Her first escort was Convoy OS4 to Bathurst, Gambia.

On 27 August 1941, Lulworth rescued 27 survivors of the Norwegian motor cargo ship Segundo, which the German submarine U-557 had torpedoed and sunk in the North Atlantic west of Ireland (Note: at 53°36′N 16°40′W) in an attack on Convoy OS-4, picking up two of them from life rafts about 30 minutes after Segundo sank, then 23 more from lifeboats, and finally two more clinging to floating debris after about two hours. On 23 September 1941, she picked up 37 survivors of the British steam cargo ship Niceto de Larrinaga, which the German submarine U-103 had torpedoed and sunk on 22 September 1941 in the North Atlantic southwest of the Canary Islands (Note: at 27°32′N 024°26′W) in an attack on Convoy SL 87. On 24 September 1941 she rescued five survivors of the British steam cargo ship St. Clair II, also from Convoy SL-87, which the German submarine U-67 had torpedoed and sunk in the North Atlantic that day west-northwest of the Canary Islands. (Note: at 30°25′N 23°35′W) She landed the survivors from the sunken merchant ships at Derry on 4 October 1941.

On 31 October 1941, Lulworth picked up 22 survivors from lifeboats from the Dutch steam cargo ship Bennekom, which the German submarine U-96 had torpedoed and sunk that evening in the North Atlantic about 530 nautical miles (980 km; 610 mi) west of Cape Clear, Ireland (Note: at 51°20′N 23°40′W) in an attack on Convoy OS 10. She took aboard another 25 Bennekom survivors from the sloop-of-war HMS Culver, which had rescued them from a life raft and a floating hatch cover. She landed all 47 of the survivors at Bathurst, New Brunswick, Canada, on 30 November 1941.

On 14 July 1942, Lulworth was escorting Convoy SL 115 when she depth charged the Italian submarine Pietro Calvi and forced her to surface. She then opened fire on Pietro Calvi, further damaging her; Pietro Calvi's crew scuttled her and abandoned ship; 35 members of Pietro Calvi's crew survived.

In July 1943, Lulworth went into refit and preparation for serving in the East. Coming out of refit she sailed to Gibraltar, on to Alexandria then to Aden and began service in the Indian Ocean escorting convoys between Kilindini, Aden and Durban.

In 1945 she transferred to Trincomalee for escorting convoys as part of the operations in Burma. This included Operation Dracula and Operation Zipper

Lulworth remained in Royal Navy service through the end of World War II in 1945. The Royal Navy transferred Lulworth back to the U.S. Coast Guard on 12 February 1946.

=== U.S. Coast Guard - Chelan (post-war) ===
After her return to the U.S. Coast Guard, the vessel returned to the name USCGC Chelan. She was sold on 23 October 1947.

== See also ==
- List of United States Coast Guard cutters
