= Sharks and Little Fish =

1954 novel by Wolfgang Ott

Sharks And Little Fish
- First US edition (Pantheon Books)
- Author: Wolfgang Ott
- Original title: Haie und kleine Fische
- Translator: Ralph Manheim
- Language: English
- Publisher: The Lyons Press
- Publication date: 1954 (German); 1957 (English)
- Publication place: Germany
- Pages: 432
- ISBN: 978-1-58574-809-9
- OCLC: 53028703

Sharks and Little Fish is a novel written by German author Wolfgang Ott. First published in 1954, it is based on the author's own experiences as a young submariner. The story centers on a sailor called Teichmann, a cynical young man who at the age of seventeen is thrown into the horror and cruelty of war at sea and particularly of submarine warfare in World War II. (The protagonist's first name is Hans, but all throughout the book he and others are referred to by surname).

The book's plot is divided into two roughly equal parts, the first dealing with Teichmann's career on a minesweeper and the second with his service aboard a U-boat. In both branches of naval service, the Germans first manage to hold their own but the Allies increasingly get the upper hand, and in both cases Teichmann's involvement ends with a traumatic shipwreck and the horrors which scavenging gulls can inflict on helpless sailors adrift on the sea. In between scenes on the sea are the protagonist's complicated relations with the two women in his life: Dora, a Hamburg prostitute (later brothel owner) who loves him, and Edith, his captain's wife, with whom he is deeply and very guiltily in love.

Teichmann's attitude to the Nazi regime is complicated and ambivalent. On the one hand, he considers Goebbels' propaganda as stupid nonsense and feels nothing but contempt for fanatic Nazis which he meets. However, he also refuses to take a clear stand against the regime – even when a dissident fellow sailor reveals to him that Germany's Jews are being systematically murdered – and he persists in going out to sea again and again, even when knowing it to be futile and realizing that the U-boats have lost the Battle of the Atlantic and that Germany is about to lose the whole war. Teichmann feels no hatred or animosity towards the British sailors opposing him, regarding them as fellow mariners who due to circumstances were thrust into the situation of trying to kill him. On the other hand, he feels a murderous hatred towards members of the French Resistance who try to kill him when leaving a brothel while on shore leave in La Rochelle and who do manage to kill his rather naive shipmate.

Reviewer Frederic Morton called the novel a "German counterpart to The Caine Mutiny". In particular, early in his career Teichmann happens to serve under a bad captain comparable to Herman Wouk's Captain Queeg - tyrannical, coward and drunkard. This episode ends much more brutally than in The Caine Mutiny - crew members cut the captain's throat while he lies drunk, and throw his body overboard to be chewed up by the ship's propeller and hide the manner of his death.

This bad Captain is contrasted with two good Captains - very different from each other - that Teichmann meets later in his career. In the later part of his minesweeper career, he serves under an urbane and intellectual Captain, whom Teichmann clearly adopts as a father figure. This relationship ends with a harrowing shipwreck, Teichmann and the Captain - both severely wounded - adrift in a small boat, and scavenging gulls peck out the Captain's eyes. By sheer willpower and endurance, Teichmann manages to bring the boat to shore - all the time very conscious that he is saving the life of Edith's husband and bringing him back to her. Later on, he visits the Captain, now invalidated, living in a comfortable house, and composing a treatise critical of the conduct of the war at sea and the war in general. There develops a strong sexual tension between Teichmann and Edith, and the Captain's blindness offers a perfect chance for illicit dalliance. Guilt-ridden, Teichmann escapes from the house, and when he boards the train, Edith suddenly appears on the platform to plead with him: "Please, never come back! Never, never!". Nor does he.

In the U-Boat Teichmann serves under a completely different kind of Captain - harsh and tyrannical, but highly courageous and an incomparable skillful seaman, so that even while hating him the crew are willing to trust him with their lives. The U-boat shifts from the heat of the Caribbean to the cold of the North Atlantic, scores some successes but experiences the turn of the tide as the British win at last the long-contested Battle of the Atlantic. The situation grows increasingly grim, and Teichmann loses his best friend - whose leg got amputated and who then just loses the will to live and fades away. In the cataclysmic final episode, the U-boat hits a mine and sinks to the bottom, never to rise again. The crew are resigned to death - but the indomitable Captain exhorts the 21 submariners to don the survival suits and make for the surface - which they do, with only one loss. However, this turns out to be a very deceptive survival - the makers of the survival suits neglected to include any food or drinking water, or any means of calling for help. The U-boat survivors are thus doomed to a long-drawn out death on the surface, and even their Captain can find no further resource - and as they weaken, the gulls swoop down. Teichmann, with his earlier experience, goes mad and shouts a hysterical welcome to the gulls.

In a postscript, it is noted that the gulls have drawn the attention of a German patrol boat, which arrived to find seven of the U-boat survivors still alive. But Ott deliberately neglects to tell whether or not Teichmann was one of those seven.
