= Italian submarine Enrico Tazzoli (1935) =

Italian submarine

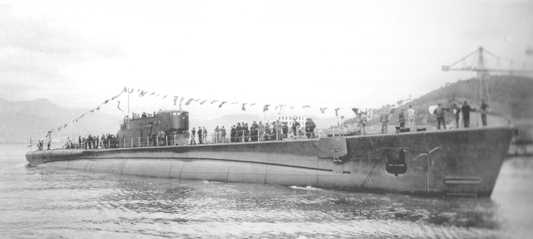
- Enrico Tazzoli

History

Italy
- Name: Enrico Tazzoli
- Namesake: Enrico Tazzoli
- Builder: Odero-Terni-Orlando, Muggiano, La Spezia
- Laid down: 16 September 1932
- Launched: 14 October 1935
- Commissioned: 18 April 1936
- Fate: Lost May 1943

General characteristics
- Class & type: Calvi-class submarine cruiser
- Displacement: 1,549 t (1,525 long tons) (surfaced); 2,061 t (2,028 long tons) (submerged)
- Length: 84.3 m (276 ft 7 in)
- Beam: 7.7 m (25 ft 3 in)
- Draft: 5.2 m (17 ft 1 in)
- Installed power: 4,400 bhp (3,300 kW) (diesels); 1,800 hp (1,300 kW) (electric motors)
- Propulsion: 2 shafts; diesel-electric; 2 × diesel engines; 2 × electric motors
- Speed: 16.8 knots (31.1 km/h; 19.3 mph) (surfaced); 7.4 knots (13.7 km/h; 8.5 mph) (submerged)
- Range: 11,400 nmi (21,100 km; 13,100 mi) at 8 knots (15 km/h; 9.2 mph) (surfaced); 120 nmi (220 km; 140 mi) at 3 knots (5.6 km/h; 3.5 mph) (submerged)
- Test depth: 90 m (300 ft)
- Crew: 77
- Armament: 8 × 533 mm (21 in) torpedo tubes (4 bow, 4 stern); 2 × single 120 mm (4.7 in) deck guns; 2 × twin 13.2 mm (0.52 in) machine guns

Enrico Tazzoli was one of three Calvi-class submarines built for the Regia Marina (Royal Italian Navy) during the 1930s. Completed in 1936, she played a minor role in the Spanish Civil War of 1936–1939 supporting the Spanish Nationalists. She operated in the Atlantic during the Second World War and was second only to the submarine Leonardo da Vinci as the highest scoring Italian submarine of the conflict. Enrico Tazzoli was converted in 1943 to be a submarine transport for blockade-running between Europe and the Far East. She was lost on her first voyage in this role. She had been pronounced missing on 17 May after loss of contact. Her loss has never been definitively explained.

== Design and description ==
The Calvi class was an improved and enlarged version of the preceding Balilla-class submarine cruisers. They displaced 1,549 metric tons (1,525 long tons) surfaced and 2,061 metric tons (2,028 long tons) submerged. The submarines were 84.3 meters (276 ft 7 in) long, had a beam of 7.7 meters (25 ft 3 in) and a draft of 5.2 meters (17 ft 1 in). They had an operational diving depth of 90 meters (300 ft). Their crew numbered 77 officers and enlisted men.

For surface running, the boats were powered by two 2,200-brake-horsepower (1,641 kW) diesel engines, each driving one propeller shaft. When submerged each propeller was driven by a 900-horsepower (671 kW) electric motor. They could reach 16.8 knots (31.1 km/h; 19.3 mph) on the surface and 7.4 knots (13.7 km/h; 8.5 mph) underwater. On the surface, the Calvi class had a range of 11,400 nautical miles (21,100 km; 13,100 mi) at 8 knots (15 km/h; 9.2 mph); submerged, they had a range of 120 nmi (220 km; 140 mi) at 3 knots (5.6 km/h; 3.5 mph).

The boats were armed with eight 53.3-centimeter (21 in) torpedo tubes, four each in the bow and in the stern for which they carried a total of 16 torpedoes. They were also armed with a pair of 120-millimeter (4.7 in) deck guns, one each fore and aft of the conning tower, for combat on the surface. Their anti-aircraft armament consisted of two twin-gun mounts for 13.2-millimeter (0.52 in) machine guns.

== Construction and career ==
Enrico Tazzoli, named after Enrico Tazzoli, was laid down by Odero-Terni-Orlando at their Muggiano, La Spezia shipyard in 1932, launched on 14 October 1935 and completed the following year. During the Spanish Civil War, she unsuccessfully attacked a Republican destroyer off Cartagena with four torpedoes on 27 December. During her patrol off Cartagena on 13–27 January 1937, the submarine missed a ship with two torpedoes.

Italy's entry into World War II in June 1940 found Tazzoli in operations in the western Mediterranean. In October she was assigned to BETASOM, the Regia Marina's task force in the Atlantic campaign. In December Tazzoli operated off the British Isles in company with five other Italian boats, but saw little success.

Operations during the autumn and winter of 1940 showed the Italian vessels were ill-suited to conditions in the North Atlantic, so the spring 1941 saw a change in strategy by Admiral Donitz, the Commander of U-boats (Befehlshaber der U-Boote BdU). The BETASOM boats were assigned to long-distance patrols into the mid- and south-Atlantic, to spread the commerce war further afield. Tazzoli was commanded by Carlo Fecia di Cossato, one of Italy's foremost naval officers. Tazzoli's next patrols, to the Azores in the spring and to West Africa in the summer, were more successful, claiming three victims in each case.

In December 1941 Tazzoli was involved in the rescue of the crews from the German commerce raider Atlantis and the supply ship Python, both sunk by British cruisers in the South Atlantic. With her sister ships Calvi and Finzi, she brought home over 200 survivors from the Cape Verde islands to St. Nazaire, France, this regarded as an epic of maritime rescue.

In February 1942 Tazzoli made her most successful raiding patrol, to the Caribbean as part of Operation Neuland. Over a two-month period she sank six Allied merchant ships. In summer she returned to the Caribbean, but in nearly three months found only two victims. At the end of the year Tazzoli operated off the coast of Brazil, claiming four more victims. In March 1943 Tazzoli was handed over for conversion to a submarine transport, for blockade-running to the Far East, and her commander received a new posting.

=== Fate ===
In May 1943 the submarine set out for Japanese-occupied territory with a cargo of 165 metric tons (162 long tons) of trade goods. On 17 May contact was lost, and she was pronounced missing. Enrico Tazzoli might have been sunk in the Bay of Biscay in attacks by USS MacKenzie. Brice (1981) has it being bombed in the Bay on 23 May. There is no certain explanation for her loss.

== Patrol history ==
Tazzoli conducted ten war patrols over a 30-month period and made one voyage as a blockade-runner.

War patrols by Enrico Tazzoli
	Dates	Area	Notes
1st	30 June − 2 July 1940	North Africa	No ships
2nd	30 July − 9 Aug 1940	Gibraltar	Failed to pass
3rd	2−24 October 1940	North Atlantic	Sank 1 merchant ship; joined BETASOM at Bordeaux
4th	13 December 1940 − 6 January 1941	British Isles	Sank 1 merchant ship
5th	7 April − 23 May 1941	Azores	Sank 3 merchant ships
6th	15 July − 11 September 1941	Freetown	Sank 3 merchant ships
7th	7–27 December 1941	South Atlantic	Rescue sortie for crew of raider Atlantis
8th	2 –31 March 1942	Caribbean	Operation Neuland; sank 6 merchant ships
9th	18 June – 5 September 1942	Caribbean	Sank 2 merchant ships
10th	14 November 1942 – 2 February 1943	Brazil	Sank 4 merchant ships
11th	16 May 1943 –	To Penang	Cargo to Far East, sunk

== Ships sunk ==
Tazzoli is credited with sinking 18 ships, for a total of 96,650 GRT, making her the highest-scoring Italian submarine after Leonardo da Vinci.

Patrols
	Date	Ship	Flag	GRT	Notes
3rd	12 October 1940	Orao	Yugoslavia	5,135	Shelled 35°34′N, 10°35′W, torpedoed while radioing; 2† 33 surv.
4th	27 December 1940	Ardanbahn	Merchant Navy	4,980	Un-escorted Convoy OB 263, 59°16′N, 20°27′W, 40† 0 surv.
5th	15 April 1941	Aurillac	Merchant Navy	4,248	Freighter, 37°09′N, 18°42′W, 1† 40 surv.
5th	7 May 1941	Fernlane	Norway	4,310	Ammunition ship, 10°02′N, 20°17′′W, 0† 35 surv.
5th	10 May 1941	Alfred Olsen	Norway	8,817	Tanker, 02°59′N, 20°26′W, 0† 34 surv.
6th	19 August 1941	Sildra	Norway	7,313	Tanker, 05°30′N, 12°50′W, 0† 40 surv.
8th	6 March 1942	Astrea	Netherlands	1,406	Freighter, 0†
8th	6 March 1942	Tønsbergfjord	Norway	3,156	Freighter; 31°22′N, 68°05′W, 1† 32 surv.
8th	8 March 1942	Montevideo	Uruguay	5,785	Freighter; 14†
8th	10 March 1942	Cygnet	Greece	3,628	Freighter; 0†
8th	13 March 1942	Daytonian	Merchant Navy	6,434	Freighter; 26°33′N, 73°43′W, 1† 58 surv
8th	15 March 1942	Athelqueen	Merchant Navy	8,780	Tanker; 26°50′N, 75°40′W, 3† 46 surv.
9th	2 August 1942	Kastor	Greece	5,497	Freighter; 11°06′N, 59°05′W, 4† 31 surv.
9th	6 August 1942	Havsten	Norway	6,161	Tanker; 11°18′N, 54°45′W, 2† 1 pow, 30 surv.
10th	12 December 1942	Empire Hawk	Merchant Navy	5,032	Freighter, 0†
10th	12 December 1942	Ombilin	Netherlands	5,658	Freighter, 07°25′N, 39°19′W, 0† 2 pow, 79 surv.
10th	21 December 1942	Queen City	Merchant Navy	4,814	Freighter, 00°49′S, 41°34′W, 6†
10th	25 December 1942	Doña Aurora	United States	5,011	Freighter, 02°02′S, 35°17′W 7† 2 pow, 62 surv.
Total:				96,165	

== See also ==
Italian submarines of World War II
