= SS Monagas =

History

Venezuela
- Name: Monagas
- Owner: Mene Grande Oil Co CA
- Port of registry: Maracaibo, Venezuela
- Builder: Palmer's Shipbuilding & Iron Co. Ltd.
- Yard number: 974
- Launched: 15 July 1927
- Completed: August 1927
- Fate: Torpedoed and sunk 16 February 1942

General characteristics
- Type: Tanker
- Tonnage: 2,650 GRT
- Length: 93.1 m (305 ft 5 in)
- Beam: 15.3 m (50 ft 2 in)
- Depth: 5 m (16 ft 5 in)
- Installed power: 2 × 3 cyl. triple expansion engines
- Propulsion: Double screw propellers
- Speed: 9 knots (17 km/h; 10 mph)
- Crew: 31

SS Monagas was a Venezuelan tanker that was torpedoed by the German submarine U-502 in the Gulf of Venezuela 12 nautical miles (22 km) west of Punta Macolla on 16 February 1942 while she was travelling from Maracaibo, Venezuela to Aruba while carrying a cargo of oil products.

== Construction ==
Monagas was built at the Palmer's Shipbuilding & Iron Co. Ltd. shipyard in Newcastle upon Tyne, United Kingdom in August 1927, where she was launched and completed that same year. The ship was 93.1 metres (305 ft 5 in) long, had a beam of 15.3 metres (50 ft 2 in) and had a depth of 5 metres (16 ft 5 in). She was assessed at 2,650 gross register tons (GRT) and had two 3-cylinder triple expansion engines driving two screw propellers. The ship could generate 212 nominal horsepower with a speed of 9 knots (17 km/h; 10 mph) thanks to her two boilers.

== Sinking ==
Monagas was travelling unescorted and unarmed from Maracaibo, Venezuela to Aruba while carrying a cargo of oil products when on 16 February 1942 at 10.28 am, she was hit in the engine room aft on the port side by a G7e torpedo from the German submarine U-502 in the Gulf of Venezuela 12 nautical miles (22 km) west of Punta Macolla. The ship came to a standstill and only slightly settled in the water by the stern. Because she did not sink, the U-boat fired another torpedo at the ship 14 minutes after the first one as a coup de grâce, hitting her again aft on the port side underneath the funnel. This attack broke the ship's back which set her ablaze and made her develop a heavy list, but still did not sink her. The ship continued to burn for three days before sinking 4 nautical miles (7.4 km) north of Punta Espada, Guajira, Colombia. The attack and sinking killed five crewmembers with the 26 survivors being rescued by the Venezuelan gunboat ARV General Urdaneta, SS Rosalia and SS Ramona.

== Wreck ==
The wreck of Monagas lies at approximately 12°03′N 70°25′W.
