= HMCS Halifax (K237) =

Flower-class corvette

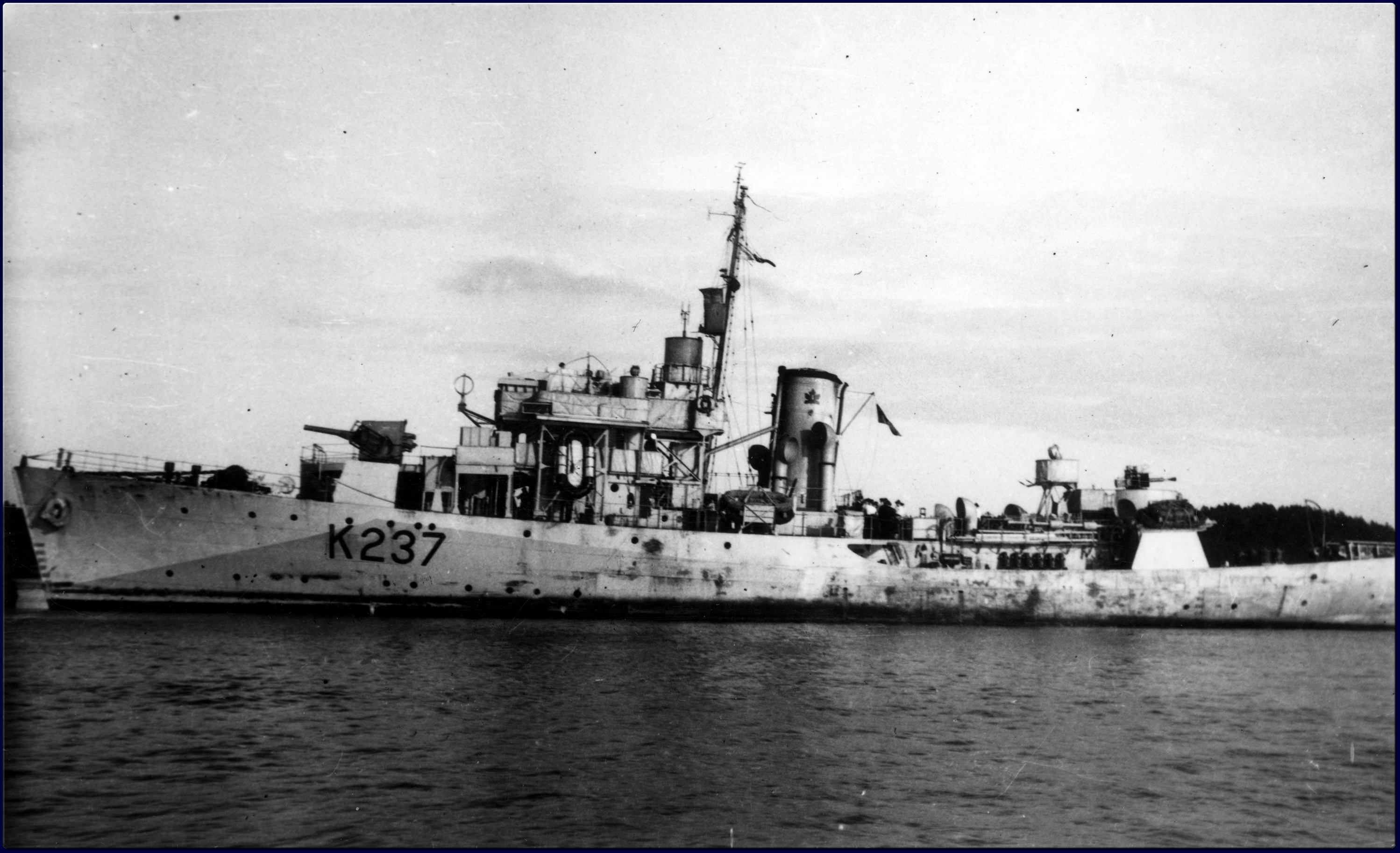
- HMCS Halifax, circa 1943–1945.

History

Canada
- Name: Halifax
- Namesake: Halifax, Nova Scotia
- Builder: Collingwood Shipyards Ltd., Collingwood
- Laid down: 26 April 1941
- Launched: 4 October 1941
- Commissioned: 26 November 1941
- Decommissioned: 12 July 1945
- Identification: Pennant number: K237
- Honours and awards: Atlantic 1942–45
- Fate: Sold in 1945 as mercantile Halifax for use as salvage vessel

General characteristics
- Class & type: Flower-class corvette (Revised)
- Displacement: 1,015 long tons (1,031 t; 1,137 short tons)
- Length: 205 ft (62.48 m)o/a
- Beam: 33 ft (10.06 m)
- Draught: 15.7 ft (4.79 m)
- Propulsion: 1940-1941 program; single shaft; 2 × water tube boilers; 1 × double acting triple-expansion reciprocating steam engine; 2,750 ihp (2,050 kW)
- Speed: 16 knots (29.6 km/h)
- Range: 3,500 nautical miles (6,482 km) at 12 knots (22.2 km/h)
- Complement: 85
- Sensors & processing systems: 1 × SW1C or 2C radar; 1 × Type 123A or Type 127DV sonar
- Armament: 1 × BL 4 in (102 mm) Mk.IX gun; 2 × .50 cal machine gun (twin); 2 × Lewis .303 cal machine gun (twin); 2 × Mk.II depth charge throwers; 4 × depth charge rails with 40 depth charges

HMCS Halifax was a Royal Canadian Navy revised Flower-class corvette which took part in convoy escort duties during the Second World War. She served primarily in the Battle of the Atlantic. She was named for Halifax, Nova Scotia.

== Background ==
Flower-class corvettes like Halifax serving with the Royal Canadian Navy during the Second World War were different from earlier and more traditional sail-driven corvettes. The "corvette" designation was created by the French as a class of small warships; the Royal Navy borrowed the term for a period but discontinued its use in 1877. During the hurried preparations for war in the late 1930s, Winston Churchill reactivated the corvette class, needing a name for smaller ships used in an escort capacity, in this case based on a whaling ship design. The generic name "flower" was used to designate the class of these ships, which – in the Royal Navy – were named after flowering plants.

Corvettes commissioned by the Royal Canadian Navy during the Second World War were named after communities for the most part, to better represent the people who took part in building them. This idea was put forth by Admiral Percy W. Nelles. Sponsors were commonly associated with the community for which the ship was named. Royal Navy corvettes were designed as open sea escorts, while Canadian corvettes were developed for coastal auxiliary roles which was exemplified by their minesweeping gear. Eventually the Canadian corvettes would be modified to allow them to perform better on the open seas.

== Construction ==
Halifax was ordered as part of the Revised 1940–41 Flower-class building program. This revised program radically changed the look of the Flower-class corvette. The ships of this program kept the water-tube boilers of the initial 1940–41 program, but now they were housed in separate compartments for safety. The fo'c'sle was extended, which allowed more space for berths for the crew, leading to an expansion of the crew. The bow had increased flare for better control in heavy seas. The revised Flowers of the RCN received an additional two depth charge throwers fitted amidships and more depth charges. They also came with heavier secondary armament with 20-mm anti-aircraft guns carried on the extended bridge wings. All this led to an increase in displacement, draught and length.

Halifax was laid down by Collingwood Shipyards Ltd. at Collingwood on 26 April 1941 and launched on 4 October of that year. She was commissioned into the RCN 6 weeks later on 26 November at Montreal, Quebec. During her career she had two significant refits. The first took place between May and October 1943 at Liverpool, Nova Scotia. The second began at Lunenburg, Nova Scotia and was completed at Halifax.

== War service ==
After arriving at Halifax 18 December, Halifax was initially assigned to the Western Local Escort Force (WLEF). On 19 May 1942, Halifax rescued three survivors from the crew of the American trawler Foam which was sunk by gunfire by U-432 south of Halifax. In July 1942 she transferred to Halifax Force as an escort to tanker convoys leaving Aruba. In August she was assigned to TAW (Trinidad-Aruba-Key West) convoys. She took part in the only major convoy battle in the Caribbean Sea, TAW 15. In September 1942 she was placed under American control as an escort for convoys between New York and Guantanamo. She remained in this service until March 1943 when she rejoined WLEF.

After departing for her first refit in May 1943, Halifax returned to service in January 1944 with the Mid-Ocean Escort Force (MOEF) when she was assigned to one of their escort groups, C-1. She remained with this unit, escorting trans-Atlantic convoys, until August when she departed for another refit. After workups in Bermuda, she briefly joined Halifax Force in January 1945 before transferring back to MOEF as a member of C-9. She remained with this unit for the rest of the war.

== Post-war service ==
After the cessation of hostilities, Halifax was paid off from the RCN on 12 July 1945 at Sorel, Quebec. She was transferred to the War Assets Corporation and sold later that year as the mercantile (salvage vessel) Halifax. The ship was deleted in December 1963.
