= List of major World War II warships built by minor powers =

This is a list of major World War II surface warships built by the belligerent minor powers. Each entry into this list is a purpose-built naval ship with a displacement greater than 1,000 tons. If her full displacement exceeds 1,000 tons but the standard displacement is below this number, the warship is marked with an asterisk at the end of her name. Only vessels in commission by the end of the war qualify for this list.

A minor power in the context of the Second World War is any country that was not one of the era's Great Powers. A major warship of the Second World War is any naval vessel with a displacement greater than 1,000 tons, as opposed to minor warships.

== Allies ==
=== Brazil ===
Class	Picture	Type	Ships	Displacement (Standard/Full)	Note
Marcílio Dias class		Destroyer	Marcilio Dias; Mariz e Barros; Greenhalgh	1,500/2,200 tons	Last ship of the class stricken 1972.

=== Denmark ===
Class	Picture	Type	Ships	Displacement (Standard/Full)	Note
Herluf Trolle class		Coastal defence ship	Peder Skram	3,500/- tons	Scuttled in August 1943
Niels Juel class		Coastal defence ship	Niels Juel	3,800/- tons	After refit her standard displacement increased by 400 tons; scuttled in August 1943
Hekla class		Protected cruiser	Hekla	1,322/- tons	Survived the war, decommissioned in 1954
Hvidbjørnen class*		Fishery protection vessel	Hvidbjørnen	914/1,050 tons	Scuttled in August 1943
Ingolf class		Fishery protection vessel	Ingolf	1,180/1,357 tons	Captured by Germany in August 1943 and renamed Sleipner

=== Netherlands ===
Class	Picture	Type	Ships	Displacement (Standard/Full)	Note
Jacob van Heemskerck class		Coastal defence ship	Jacob van Heemskerck	4,920/- tons	Survived the war, decommissioned in 1974 and subsequently scrapped
De Zeven Provinciën class		Coastal defence ship	De Zeven Provinciën	6,530/- tons	Captured by Japan in 1942, sunk by Allied aircraft in 1943
Koningin Regentes class		Coastal defence ship	Hertog Hendrik	5,002/- tons	Survived the war, decommissioned in 1968 and subsequently scrapped
Holland class		Protected cruiser	Gelderland	4,033/4,100 tons	Retired in early 1940, captured by German forces and converted to Flakschiff. Sunk by Sbombers and fighters in 1944.
Java class		Light cruiser	Java; Sumatra	6,670/8,087 tons	Neither survived the war, Java was sunk during the Battle of the Java Sea while Sumatra was scuttled in June 1944
De Ruyter class		Light cruiser	De Ruyter	6,650/-	Sunk during the Battle of the Java Sea
Tromp class		Light cruiser	Tromp; Jacob van Heemskerck	3,404/-	Both survived the war and were decommissioned in the late 1960s
Admiralen class		Destroyer	Van Ghent; Evertsen; Kortenaer; Piet Hein; Van Galen; Witte de With; Banckert; Van Nes	1,316/1,640	All eight were sunk during the war
Gerard Callenburgh class		Destroyer	Gerard Callenburgh; Isaac Sweers	1,604/2,228	Both were sunk during the war
Van Kinsbergen class		Sloop	Van Kinsbergen	1,760/2,388	Scrapped in 1974
Johan Maurits van Nassau class		Gunboat	Johan Maurits van Nassau	1,457/1,793	Sunk in May 1940
K class		Sloop	K1; K2; K3	1,200/1,420	K1 was sunk near the end of the war, K2 sunk under tow after the war, K3 survived and served as Van Speijk until 1960
Flores class		Gunboat	Flores; Soemba	1,480/1,822	Both survived the war and were decommissioned in 1968 and 1985 respectively
Prins van Oranje class		Minelayer	Prins van Oranje; Gouden Leeuw	1,291/- tons	Both were sunk in 1942
Willem van der Zaan class		Minelayer	Willem van der Zaan	1,422/- tons	Survived the war, scrapped in late 1970
Arend class*		Patrol ship	Arend; Valk	748/1,011 tons	Seaplane-carrying patrol vessels, both scuttled in March 1942
Krakatau class*		Minelayer	Krakatau	982/1,160 tons	Scuttled in March 1942
Rigel class		Minelayer	Rigel	1,378/1,631 tons	Scuttled in March 1942
Serdang class		Patrol ship	Serdang	1,290 tons/-	Seaplane-carrying converted gunboat scuttled in March 1942
Ram class		Minelayer	Ram; Regulus	2,400/- tons	Captured by Japan in March 1942, both completed as gunboats. Regulus sunk in 1945 by an allied submarine, Ram scrapped in 1945

=== Norway ===
Class	Picture	Type	Ships	Displacement (Standard/Full)	Note
Olav Tryggvason class		Minelayer	Olav Tryggvason	1,596/- tons	Captured by Germany in April 1940 and renamed Albatros II, wrecked on dry dock by the Royal Air Force in April 1945
Fridtjof Nansen class		Fishery protection vessel	Fridtjof Nansen	1,219/1,563 tons	Wrecked on rocks in November 1940

=== Yugoslavia ===
Class	Picture	Type	Ships	Displacement (Standard/Full)	Note
Beograd class		Destroyer	Ljubljana; Zagreb	1,210/1,655 tons	Ljubljana was captured by Italy in April 1941 and lost off the Tunisian coast in April 1943; Zagreb was scuttled in April 1941

== Axis ==
=== Finland ===
Class	Picture	Type	Ships	Displacement (Standard/Full)	Note
Väinämöinen class		Coastal defence ship	Väinämöinen; Ilmarinen	3,900/- tons	Ilmarinen was mined and sunk in 1941 during Operation Nordwind

=== Romania ===
Class	Picture	Type	Ships	Displacement (Standard/Full)	Note
Amiral Murgescu class*		Minelayer	Amiral Murgescu	812/1,068 tons	First sea-going warship built by Romania, survived the war and was scrapped in 1988
