= List of ship commissionings in 1932 =

The list of ship commissionings in 1932 includes a chronological list of all ships commissioned in 1932.

	Operator	Ship	Flag	Class and type	Pennant	Other notes
2 February	Royal Netherlands Navy	Prins van Oranje		Prins van Oranje-class minelayer		
24 February	Royal Netherlands Navy	Gouden Leeuw		Prins van Oranje-class minelayer		
June	French Navy	Commandant Teste		Seaplane tender and transport		
3 October	Royal Netherlands Navy	O 14		O 12-class submarine		
