= Dreg I-class hydrographic survey vessel =

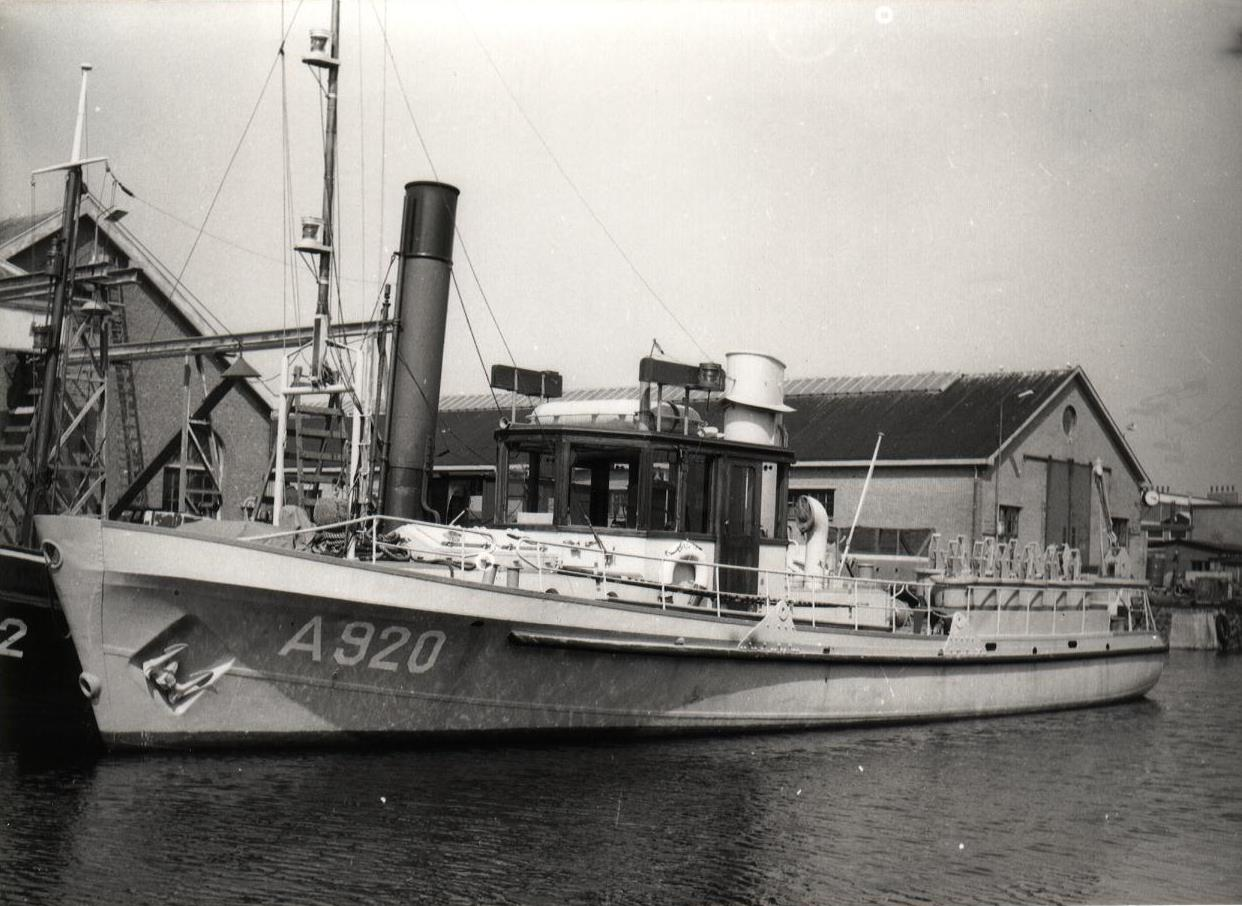
- Dreg IV

Class overview
- Name: Dreg I class
- Builders: De Groot & Van Vliet, Slikkerveer
- Operators: Royal Netherlands Navy
- Built: 1949–1950
- In service: 1950–1986
- Planned: 4
- Completed: 4

General characteristics
- Type: Hydrographic survey vessel
- Displacement: 48 t (47 long tons)
- Length: 20 m (65 ft 7 in)
- Beam: 4.40 m (14 ft 5 in)
- Draft: 1.40 metres (4 ft 7 in)
- Propulsion: 2 propellers; 120 hp (89 kW); 2 x Kromhout LSD diesel engines
- Speed: 10 knots (19 km/h; 12 mph)
- Crew: 4

The Dreg I class (Note: The class was also known in Dutch as Dregboten.) was a ship class of four hydrographic survey vessels that were built in the Netherlands for the Royal Netherlands Navy (RNN). They served in the RNN between 1950 and 1986.

== Design and construction ==
The hydrographic survey vessels of the Dreg I class were all built at the shipyard of De Groot & Van Vliet in Slikkerveer.

For surveying the vessels were equipped with echo sounders and marker buoys that were shaped as spheres.

== Service history ==
In November 1950 two vessels of the Dreg I class were transported from the Netherlands to Dutch New Guinea by ship. In total three survey vessels of the Dreg I class (Dreg I, Dreg II and Dreg III) served in Dutch New Guinea till 1 October 1962.

In 1963 the Dreg I-class hydrographic survey vessels were active in the North Sea to collect data that would help determine the safest waterway to the Europoort.

In 1966 three Dreg I-class survey vessels were used to map a part of the IJsselmeer between Staveren and Lemmer.

In 1970 three hydrographic survey vessels of the Dreg I class were sold.

== Ships in class ==
Dreg I-class construction data
| Ship | Pennant No. | Laid down | Launched | Commissioned | Decommissioned | Fate |
|---|---|---|---|---|---|---|
| Dreg I | A909 | | 15 May 1950 | 17 July 1950 | 6 April 1970 | Sold to C. Houkoop on 6 October 1970. |
| Dreg II | A910 | | 15 May 1950 | 17 July 1950 | 6 April 1970 | Sold to P. Peetoom on 6 October 1970. Later rebuild as yacht. |
| Dreg III | A919 | 14 December 1949 | 21 August 1950 | 18 September 1950 | 6 April 1970 | Sold to C.P. Vader on 6 October 1970. Later taken over by the shipping company Waterweg. |
| Dreg IV | A920 | 14 December 1949 | 21 August 1950 | 25 September 1950 | | Gifted to Stichting Onderwaterschatten Zeeland on 23 March 1987. |
