= W9 =

W9 may refer to:

== Transportation ==
- Wizz Air UK (IATA code: W9)
- Air Bagan (former IATA code: W9), a former airline of Myanmar
- London Buses route W9, England

== Other uses ==
- Form W-9, used by the US federal government for tax purposes
- W9, a postcode district in the W postcode area, England
- W9 (TV channel), a French television channel
- W9 (nuclear warhead), an American nuclear artillery shell
- Japanese minesweeper W-9, several ships
- Niland Geyser (scientific designation), California, US

== See also ==
- 9W (disambiguation)
