= HNLMS Gouden Leeuw =

Prins van Oranje-class minelayer

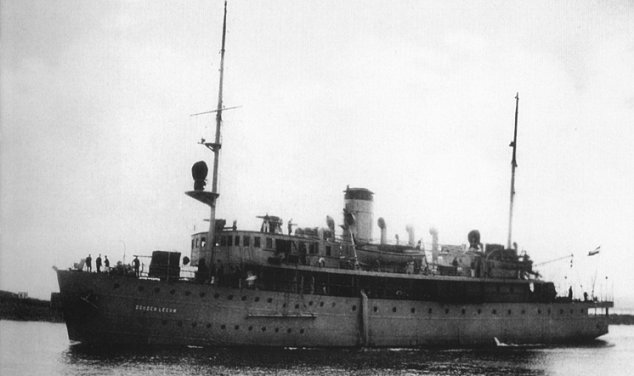
- Gouden Leeuw

History

Netherlands
- Name: Gouden Leeuw
- Builder: N.V. Internationale Scheepsbouw Mij. 'De Maas'
- Laid down: 23 September 1930
- Launched: 9 September 1931
- Commissioned: 24 February 1932
- Out of service: 7 March 1942
- Fate: Scuttled by crew 7 March 1942

General characteristics
- Displacement: 1,291 long tons (1,312 t) (full load)
- Length: 66 m (216 ft 6 in) (pp)
- Beam: 11 m (36 ft 1 in)
- Draught: 3.2 m (10 ft 6 in)
- Installed power: boilers; 1,750 ihp (1,305 kW)
- Propulsion: 2 shafts; 2 vertical triple expansion engines
- Speed: 15 knots (28 km/h; 17 mph)
- Complement: 121
- Armament: 2 × single 75 mm (3 in) AA guns; 2 × single 40 mm (1.6 in) Bofors AA guns; 2 × single 12.7 mm (0.50 in) machine guns; 150 naval mines

Gouden Leeuw (Dutch: Hr.Ms. Gouden Leeuw) was a Prins van Oranje-class minelayer built for the Royal Netherlands Navy during the 1930s, intended to serve in the Dutch East Indies. Completed in 1932, the ship was stationed there when the Pacific War began in December 1941. Gouden Leeuw laid multiple defensive minefields in East Indian waters after the war began. One of these claimed a Japanese minesweeper in February 1942. The ship was scuttled as a blockship when Dutch forces surrendered the following month.

== Description ==
The Prins van Oranje-class ships displaced 1,291 long tons (1,312 t) at deep load. They measured 66 metres (216 ft 6 in) long between perpendiculars with a beam of 11 m (36 ft 1 in) and a draught of 3.6 m (11 ft 10 in). The minelayers were powered by a pair of triple-expansion steam engines, each turning a propeller shaft. Their boilers provided enough steam for the engines to produce a total of 1,750 indicated horsepower (1,300 kW). The vessels had a maximum speed of 15 knots (28 km/h; 17 mph). They had a complement of 121 officers and ratings.

The Prins van Oranje class were armed with a pair of single-mounted 75-millimetre (3 in) anti-aircraft (AA) guns on single mounts positioned fore and aft of the superstructure. They were also armed with two 40-millimetre (1.6 in) Bofors AA guns and a pair of 12.7-millimetre (0.50 in) machine guns on single mounts. They carried 121 naval mines.

== Construction and career ==
Gouden Leeuw was laid down on 20 September 1930 at the De Maas shipyard in Slikkerveer, launched on 9 September 1931 and commissioned on 24 February 1932.

On 8 December 1932 Gouden Leeuw left the Netherlands for the Dutch East Indies, where she arrived on 27 January 1933 in Sabang. In the period of September 1939 until January 1942 Gouden Leeuw laid minefields near Balikpapan, Tarakan and Surabaja. In January and February 1942 she was part of the defending force of Surabaya. She laid mines in Madura Strait, near Tuban and near Rembang. One of these sank the Japanese minesweeper W-9 in Ambon Bay on 2 February 1942 and damaged two others. On 7 March she was scuttled by her own crew near Surabaya to prevent being captured by Japanese forces.

== Bibliography ==
- Mark, Chris (1997). Schepen van de Koninklijke Marine in W.O. II (in Dutch). De Alk. ISBN 90-6013-522-9.
- Roberts, John (1980). "The Netherlands". In Chesneau, Roger (ed.). Conway's All the World's Fighting Ships 1922–1946. Conway Maritime Press. pp. 385–396. ISBN 0-85177-146-7.
- Rohwer, Jürgen (2005). Chronology of the War at Sea 1939–1945: The Naval History of World War Two (Third Revised ed.). Naval Institute Press. ISBN 1-59114-119-2.
- van Willigenburg, Henk (2010). Dutch Warships of World War II. Lanasta. ISBN 978-90-8616-318-2.
