= List of minor warships of World War II =

This is a list of minor warships of World War II. It contains minor combat vessels that are generally under 1,000 t standard displacement, and includes fast attack craft, submarine chasers, gunboats, missile boats, torpedo boats and patrol boats. It also contains similar vessels, over 1,000 t, such as patrol vessels or patrol ships.

The list of ships of World War II contains military vessels of the war, arranged alphabetically and by type. The list includes armed vessels that served during the war and in the immediate aftermath, inclusive of localized ongoing combat operations, garrison surrenders, post-surrender occupation, colony re-occupation, troop and prisoner repatriation, to the end of 1945. For smaller vessels, see also List of World War II ships of less than 1000 tons. Some uncompleted Axis ships are included, out of historic interest. Ships are designated to the country under which they operated for the longest period of the World War II, regardless of where they were built or previous service history.

List of minor warships of World War II
Ship	Country or organization	Class	Type	Displacement (tons)	First commissioned	Fate
A4	Belgian Navy	Mersey	patrol ship	339	1920	Scrapped 1948
Albatros	Kriegsmarine	Type 23 Raubvogel	torpedo boat	1,290	5 May 1927	Beached 10 April 1940
Arteveld	Belgian Navy		patrol ship	1,640		Commissioned as Lorelei (Germany)
El Amir Farouq	Egyptian Navy		patrol ship	1,441		
Falke	Kriegsmarine	Type 23 Raubvogel	torpedo boat	1,290	15 August 1927	sunk 15 June 1944
Fridtjof Nansen	Royal Norwegian Navy		patrol ship	1,575	29 May 1931	ran aground and sank 8 November 1940
Fu An	Republic of China Navy		gunboat	1,900		
Greif	Kriegsmarine	Type 23 Raubvogel	torpedo boat	1,290	15 March 1927	sunk 23 May 1944
Hai Chen	Republic of China Navy		gunboat	2,680		
Hai Chou	Republic of China Navy		gunboat	2,680		
Hvidbjørnen	Royal Danish Navy		patrol boat	1,050		
Iltis	Kriegsmarine	Type 24 Raubtier	torpedo boat	1,320	1 October 1928	sunk 13 May 1942
Ingolf	Royal Danish Navy		patrol boat	1,180		became Sleipner (Germany)
Jaguar	Kriegsmarine	Type 24 Raubtier	torpedo boat	1,320	1 June 1929	sunk 15 June 1944
Kondor	Kriegsmarine	Type 23 Raubvogel	torpedo boat	1,290	15 July 1927	decommissioned 28 June 1944
T1	Royal Yugoslav Navy; Regia Marina	250t class	torpedo boat	320	20 July 1914	Captured by the Italians in 1941, returned in 1943 and eventually stricken in 1959
T3	Royal Yugoslav Navy; Regia Marina; Kriegsmarine	250t class	torpedo boat	320	23 August 1914	Captured by the Italians in 1941, captured by Germans in 1943 and eventually sunk by Allies in 1945
T5	Royal Yugoslav Navy; Regia Marina	250t class	torpedo boat	330	25 October 1915	Captured by the Italians in 1941, returned in 1943 and eventually broken up in 1962
T6	Royal Yugoslav Navy; Regia Marina	250t class	torpedo boat	330	16 April 1916	Captured by the Italians in 1941, scuttled by crew in 1943
T7	Royal Yugoslav Navy; Regia Marina; Navy of the Independent State of Croatia	250t class	torpedo boat	330	23 November 1916	Captured by the Italians in 1941, transferred to the Independent State of Croatia navy in 1943 and eventually sunk by Allies in 1944
T8	Royal Yugoslav Navy; Regia Marina	250t class	torpedo boat	330	22 December 1916	Captured by the Italians in 1941, sunk by Germans in 1943
T13 – T21	Kriegsmarine	Type 37	torpedo boats	1,098	1941/1942	

== See also ==
- List of major World War II warships built by minor powers
