= HNLMS Flores =

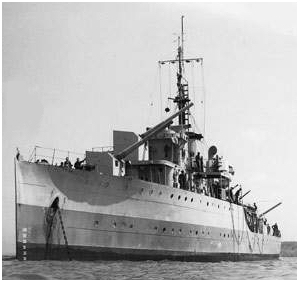
- Flores

History

Netherlands
- Name: Flores
- Namesake: Flores Island
- Builder: Mij Feijenoord, Schiedam
- Laid down: 13 January 1925
- Launched: 15 August 1925
- Commissioned: 25 March 1926
- Stricken: 26 August 1968
- Identification: Pennant numbers: F66, N1, F803, A877
- Fate: Sold for scrapping 12 November 1968

General characteristics
- Type: Flores-class gunboat
- Displacement: 1,457 long tons (1,480 t) standard; 1,793 long tons (1,822 t) full load
- Length: 75.6 m (248 ft 0 in)
- Beam: 11.5 m (37 ft 9 in)
- Draught: 3.6 m (11 ft 10 in)
- Installed power: 2,000 shp (1,500 kW); 4 Yarrow boilers
- Propulsion: 2 shafts, 2 Triple-expansion steam engines
- Speed: 15 knots (28 km/h; 17 mph)
- Complement: 145
- Armament: As built: 3 × 5.9 in (150 mm) No. 7 guns; 1 × 75 mm gun; 4 × .50 Browning machine guns; Added: 1 × 40 mm pom-pom; 4 × Hotchkiss 20 mm cannons; 8 × .303 Lewis MGs
- Armour: Bridge: 50 mm (2.0 in); Deck: 25–50 mm (0.98–1.97 in); Ammunition hoists: 25 mm (0.98 in); Gun shields: 14–80 mm (0.55–3.15 in)

HNLMS Flores (Dutch: Hr.Ms. Flores) was a Flores-class gunboat built in the mid-1920s for the Royal Netherlands Navy to patrol the Dutch East Indies.

== Construction ==
The Flores was laid down on 13 January 1925 at Fijenoord shipyard in Rotterdam. She was launched on 15 August 1925. On 25 March 1926 she was commissioned in the Dutch navy.

== Career ==
=== Dutch East Indies ===
Flores and her sister ship Soemba left the port of Den Helder on 15 June 1926 for the Dutch East Indies. They took a route that led by Seville, Tunis, Port Said, Aden, Colombo and Sabang. She arrived there on 10 August that year. On 5 March 1927 both ships made a trip to Singapore and Saigon.

After a Japanese fishing boat Tokei Maru No.7 refused to stop for investigation on 2 October 1937 the ship was seized by the Flores and fired upon, killing two men of the Japanese ship. In 1938 she made a visit to Australia.

=== World War II ===
Flores was brought back to the Netherlands at the start of World War II where she patrolled home waters until the Germans invaded in 1940. Slightly damaged, she escaped to Britain and was employed as an escort.

During the war Flores operated in the Mediterranean Sea and played an active role in the landings in Sicily, Salerno, Anzio, Garigliano, Gaeta and finally, at the beaches of Normandy in June 1944.

=== After the war ===
In 1951 Flores was reclassified as frigate. In 1955 Flores was stricken and rebuilt into an accommodation ship. Somewhere in July 1960, she was renamed Van Speijk. After the new frigate HNLMS Van Speijk was launched on 5 March 1965 she was given her old name back. She was finally stricken on 26 August 1968 and sold for scrapping on 12 November 1968. She was scrapped in Hendrik-Ido-Ambacht.
