= HNLMS Rigel =

Multi-purpose steamship of the Government Navy

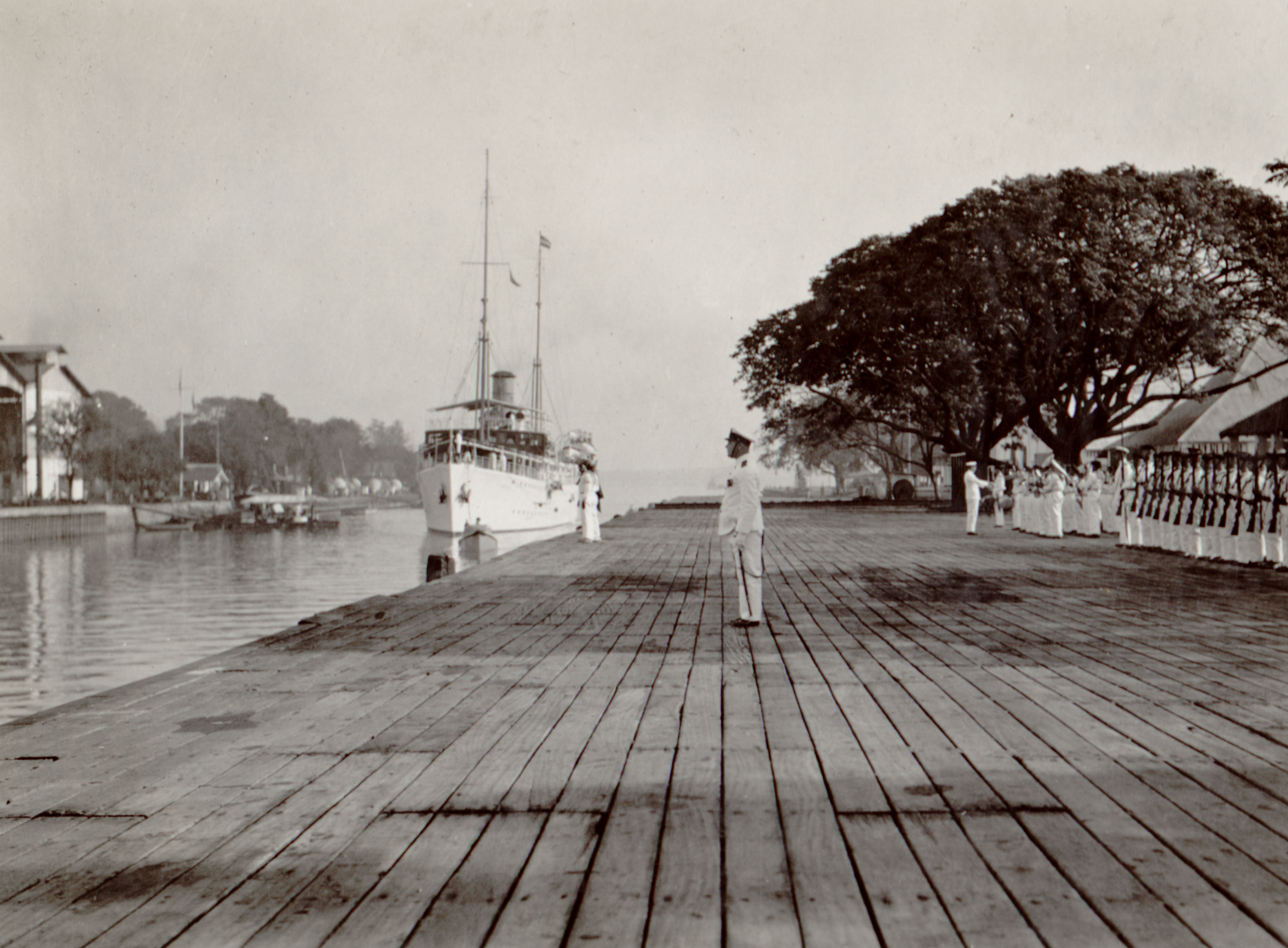
- Rigel

History

Netherlands
- Name: Rigel
- Operator: Government Navy; Royal Netherlands Navy
- Builder: Nederlandsche Dok Maatschappij, Amsterdam
- Laid down: 3 March 1930
- Launched: 7 March 1931
- Commissioned: 6 November 1931
- Fate: Scuttled on 2 March 1942 as blockship

General characteristics
- Type: Multi-purpose steamship
- Displacement: 1,631 t (1,605 long tons)
- Length: 67.50 m (221 ft 5 in)
- Beam: 11.04 m (36 ft 3 in)
- Draught: 3.06 m (10 ft 0 in)
- Propulsion: 2 propellers; 1,450 hp (1,080 kW); 2 x Triple expansion engine
- Speed: 12.5 knots (23.2 km/h; 14.4 mph)
- Crew: 67
- Armament: 2 x 7.5 cm cannon; 2 x 12.7 mm machine guns; 150 mines

HNLMS Rigel was a multi-purpose steamship of the Government Navy that could also be used as minelayer and as yacht for the Governor-general of the Dutch East Indies. The ship was militarized in 1939 and taken into service of the Royal Netherlands Navy, where it served as minelayer between 1939 and 1942.

== Design and construction ==
Rigel was built in the Netherlands at the Nederlandsche Dok Maatschappij. The ship's construction began on 3 March 1930, it was launched on 7 March 1931 and commissioned into the Government Navy on 6 November 1931. The costs of building the ship was estimated to be 1.080.000 Dutch guilders, which was considered to be quite low for this type of ship.

The ship was equipped with a double set of rails on her deck that could carry a total of 150 mines. After being militarized in 1939 Rigel also got equipped with a ASDIC installation between 1940 and 1941.

== Service history ==
In April 1938 Rigel towed the hydrographic survey vessel Hydrograaf to Soerabaja after it had lost a propeller.

=== Second World War ===
Between 1939 and 1942 Rigel laid down mines in the waters of the Dutch East Indies. Starting in August 1939 the ship was made ready to mine the Westervaarwater near Soerabaja. In December 1941 it mined the access waters to Tandjong Priok. A few months later, in February 1942, Rigel laid down mines together with the HNLMS Krakatau at the coast of Madoera.

On 2 March 1942 Rigel was scuttled by its crew and used as blockship at the northern port entrance of Tandjong Priok.

In March 1944 the ship was lifted and partly restored by the Japanese. After Japan surrendered in 1945 the ship was found and handed over to the Dienst van Scheepsvaart (DvS).

In 1951 the ship was transferred to the Indonesian Navy.
