= 9W =

9W or 9-W may refer to:

== Transportation ==
- Jet Airways (former IATA code: 9W), a former Indian airline
- List of highways numbered 9W
  - U.S. Route 9W, a highway in the states of New York & New Jersey
  - New York State Route 9W
  - Mississippi Highway 9W

== Other uses ==
- 9th meridian west (9°W), a longitude coordinate

== See also ==
- GE BB40-9W, locomotive
- C44-9W, a model of GE Dash 9-44CW locomotive
- C40-9W, a model of GE Dash 9-40CW locomotive
- Z-9W, a model of Harbin Z-9 a Chinese military helicopter
- W9 (disambiguation)
