= Arend-class patrol ship =

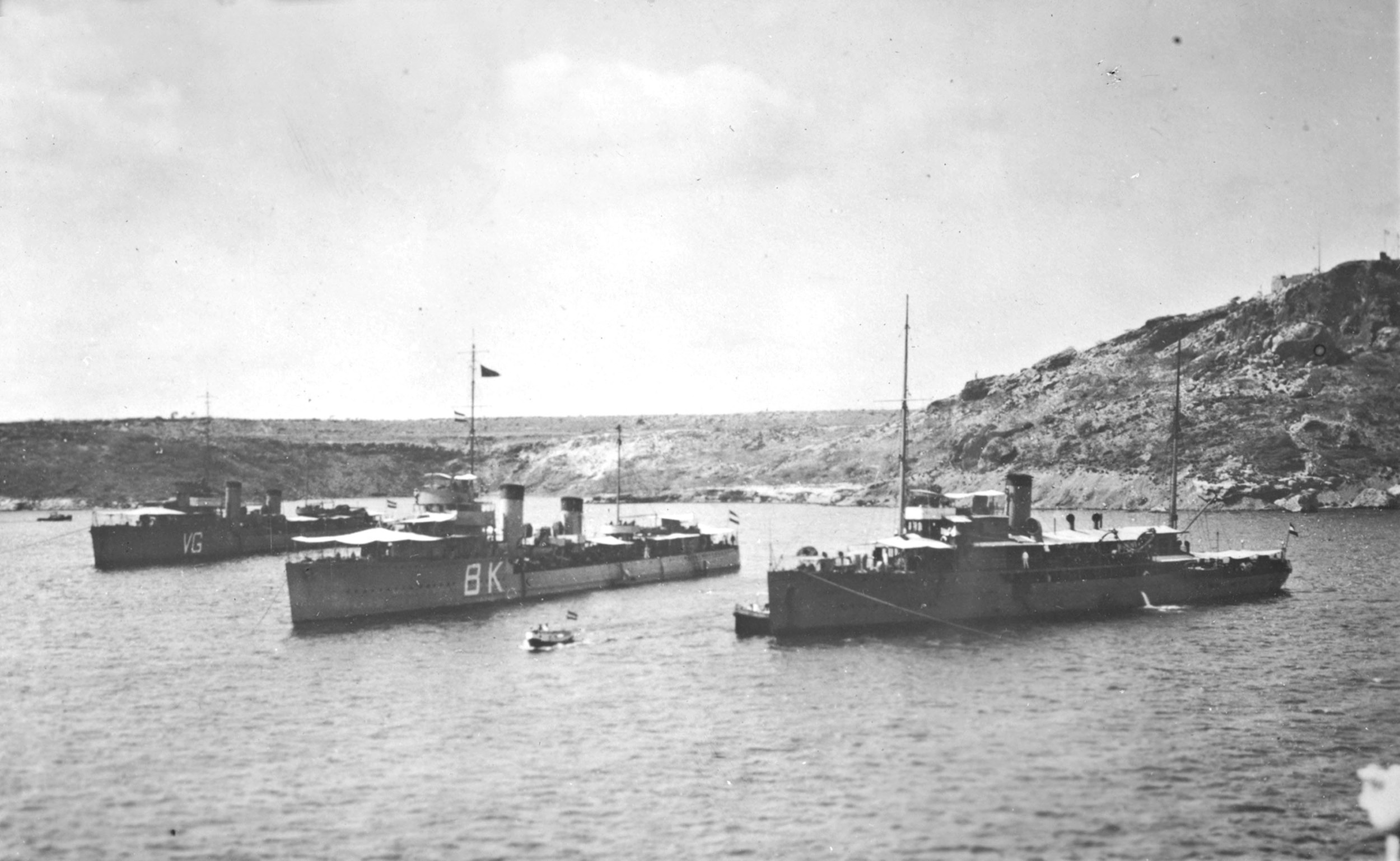
- HNLMS Arend (right) with the Admiralen-class destroyers HNLMS Banckert (centre) and HNLMS Van Galen (left)

Class overview
- Name: Arend class
- Builders: NV Dok en Werf Maatschappij Wilton-Fijenoord
- Operators: Royal Netherlands Navy
- Preceded by: Argus class
- In commission: 1930–1942
- Planned: 2
- Completed: 2
- Lost: 2

General characteristics
- Type: Patrol ship, seaplane tender
- Displacement: 933 tons; 1011 tons (full load)
- Length: 72.13 m (236 ft 8 in)
- Beam: 9.02 m (29 ft 7 in)
- Draught: 2.895 m (9 ft 6.0 in)
- Propulsion: 1 × 2,908 ihp (2,168 kW) triple expansion engine
- Speed: 18.5 knots (34.3 km/h; 21.3 mph)
- Complement: 65
- Armament: 2 × 7.5 cm (3.0 in) cannon; 1 × 7.7 mm (0.30 in) machine gun

The Arend class (sometimes referred to as Valk class) was a class of two "opium hunters", meaning fast patrol boats built by the Maatschappij voor Scheeps- en Werktuigbouw Fijenoord in Rotterdam for service with the Government Navy. The class consisted of HNLMS Arend and HNLMS Valk.

== Construction ==
Name	Laid down	Commissioned	Fate
Arend	5 July 1928	16 January 1930 as patrol ship 10 April 1935 as opium hunter	Scuttled by own crew 7 March 1942
Valk	22 September 1928	9 April 1930	Scuttled by own crew 7 March 1942

== Service history ==
Arend was commandeered by the Royal Netherlands Navy while still under construction as there was a shortage of available ships to protect the overseas Caribbean territories. She was therefore slightly modified in design and receive more armor plating. She was returned to the Gouvernements Marine in 1935 once HNLMS Johan Maurits van Nassau had been completed and was able to take over the role of protecting the Dutch Caribbean.

Valk was employed as designed, as an opium hunter with the Government Navy after entering commission in 1930. During the Second World War, both ships served as patrol ships and seaplane tenders for PBY Catalina aircraft. After the fall of Java, both ships were scuttled by their crews as they were unable to escape to Ceylon or Australia.
