= HNLMS Nautilus (1929) =

History

Netherlands
- Name: Nautilus
- Operator: Royal Netherlands Navy
- Builder: Rotterdamsche Droogdok Maatschappij, Rotterdam
- Laid down: 25 January 1929
- Launched: 30 October 1929
- Commissioned: 2 May 1930
- Identification: M 12
- Fate: Sunk near Saltfleet, 22 May 1941

General characteristics
- Type: Minelayer and Patrol vessel
- Displacement: 800 t (790 long tons) (standard)
- Length: 58.7 m (192 ft 7 in) (o/a)
- Beam: 9.50 m (31 ft 2 in)
- Draught: 3.5 m (11 ft 6 in)
- Installed power: 3 boilers; 1,350 ihp (1,010 kW)
- Propulsion: 2 propellers; 2 triple-expansion steam engines
- Speed: 15 knots (28 km/h; 17 mph)
- Crew: 50
- Armament: 2 × single 7.5 cm (3.0 in) AA guns; 2 × single 4 cm (1.6 in) AA guns; 1 × single 12.7 mm (0.50 in) machine guns; 40 mines

HNLMS Nautilus (M12) was a minelayer and fisheries protection (Note: In Dutch the ship was classified as "visserijpolitiekruiser".) vessel built for the Royal Netherlands Navy (RNN) during the 1920s. Completed in 1930, she played a minor role during the Second World War. After Germany invaded the Netherlands in May 1940 the ship fled to the United Kingdom. Nautilus served as a convoy escort before she was sunk after a collision with a British merchant ship in 1941.

== Description ==
Nautilus had a standard displacement of 800 long tons (813 t). She measured 58.7 metres (192 ft 7 in) long overall with a beam of 9.5 m (31 ft 2 in) and a draught of 3.5 m (11 ft 6 in). The minelayer was powered by a pair of triple-expansion steam engines, each of which turned a single propeller shaft using steam provided by three boilers. The engines were rated at a total of 1,007 kilowatts (1,350 ihp) and gave the ship a speed of 15 knots (28 km/h; 17 mph). The nautilus had a complement of 50 officers and ratings. The ship was armed with two 75-millimetre (3 in) anti-aircraft (AA) guns, two 40-millimetre (1.6 in) Bofors AA guns, and a single 12.7-millimetre (0.50 in) machine gun. She carried 50 naval mines.

== Construction and career ==
Nautilus was laid down on 25 January 1929 at the Rotterdamsche Droogdok Maatschappij in Rotterdam and assigned yard number 158. She was launched on 30 October 1929 and commissioned on 2 May 1930. The vessel was built. The ship was designed to fulfill the function of both a minelayer and fisheries protection vessel in the North Sea.

On 12 May 1940 the Nautilus laid mines at Haaksgronden. Two days later, the ship fled to the United Kingdom. From February 1941 onwards the Nautilus performed escorting duties for convoys. On 22 May 1941, while escorting the merchant vessels Heklo and Murrayfield, the Nautilus collided with Murrayfield and shortly after sunk near the opening of the Humber near Saltfleet. All personnel were saved.
