= HNLMS Willem van der Zaan (ML-2) =

Ship of the Royal Netherlands Navy

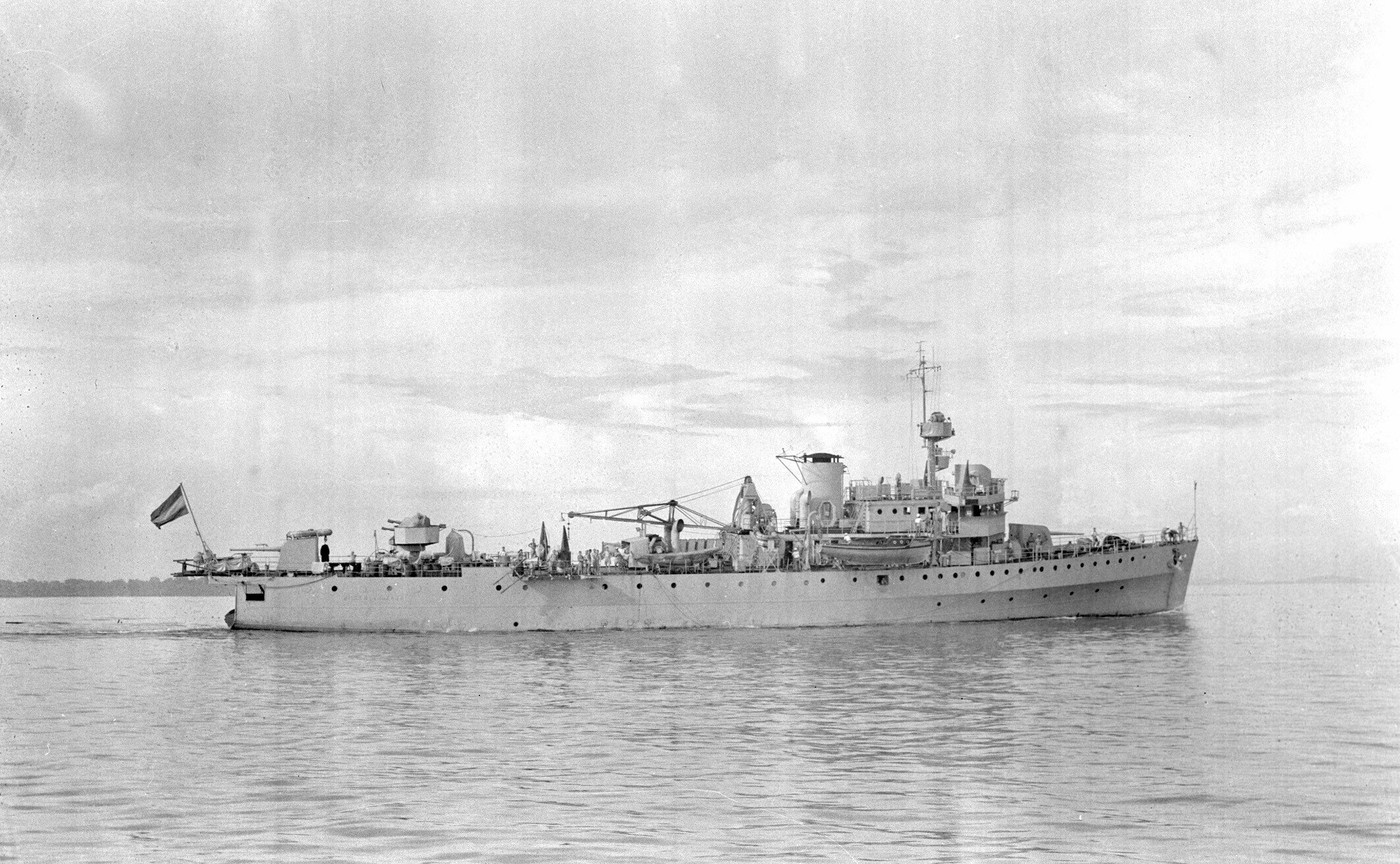
- Willem van der Zaan in 1940

History

Netherlands
- Name: Hr. Ms. Willem van der Zaan
- Namesake: Willem van der Zaan
- Builder: Nederlandse Droogdok Maatschappij, Amsterdam
- Laid down: 18 January 1938
- Launched: 15 December 1938
- Commissioned: 21 August 1939
- Decommissioned: 27 February 1970
- Fate: Sold for scrapping, 6 October 1970

General characteristics
- Displacement: 1,400 long tons (1,422 t)
- Length: 75.25 m (246 ft 11 in)
- Beam: 11.2 m (36 ft 9 in)
- Draught: 3.4 m (11 ft 2 in)
- Propulsion: 2 Triple-expansion engines; 2 Yarrow boilers; 2 screws; 2,200 ihp (1,641 kW)
- Speed: 15.5 knots (28.7 km/h; 17.8 mph)
- Complement: 140
- Armament: 2 × 120 mm (4.7 in) guns; 4 × 40 mm guns; 4 × 12.7 mm machine guns; 120 mines

HNLMS Willem van der Zaan (ML-2/N82/F824/A880) was a minelayer of the Royal Netherlands Navy that was commissioned only days before the start of World War II in September 1939. She served in England, in the Netherlands East Indies, and as a convoy escort in the Indian Ocean before returning to The Netherlands in 1945. She then served again in the Netherlands East Indies and Dutch West Indies until 1950 when she was rebuilt and reclassified as a frigate. From 1961 she was used as an accommodation and repair ship until struck in 1970 and sold for scrap. She was named in honour of the 17th century Schout-bij-nacht Willem van der Zaan.

== Service history ==
=== World War II ===
The ship was laid down by the Nederlandse Droogdok Maatschappij ("Dutch Drydock Company") at Amsterdam, on 18 January 1938, and launched on 15 December 1938. After sea trials the ship was commissioned on 21 August 1939, just before the outbreak of the war. On 3 September 1939 the Willem van der Zaan commenced wartime operations by laying 98 mines near Den Helder, adding another 97 mines on 22 September. Minelaying operations continued until 10 May 1940, when the German invasion began. As the Dutch attempted to fight off the overwhelming German invasion forces Willem van der Zaan was deployed in the anti-aircraft role, and laid a tactical mine barrage of the Scheldt estuary with Jan van Brakel and Nautilus. On 13 May she sailed from Den Helder for the UK, arriving at Portsmouth on the 14th, carrying 10 torpedoes and other equipment for the cruiser Sumatra, and four Luftwaffe prisoners from a downed aircraft.

Willem van der Zaan was modified at Portsmouth Dockyard to lay British mines in June, laying 12 dummy mines of Spithead on the 28th as a trial, also testing new paravanes and smokescreen. She was then stationed in Immingham under the command of Senior Officer Minelayers. In cooperation with the British minelayer Plover and auxiliary minelayer Teviot Bank, and protected by ships of the 20th Destroyer Flotilla, Willem van der Zaan completed eight missions and laid 2,198 mines off the east coast of England. On 3 October she sailed to King George's Drydock in Hull for repairs.

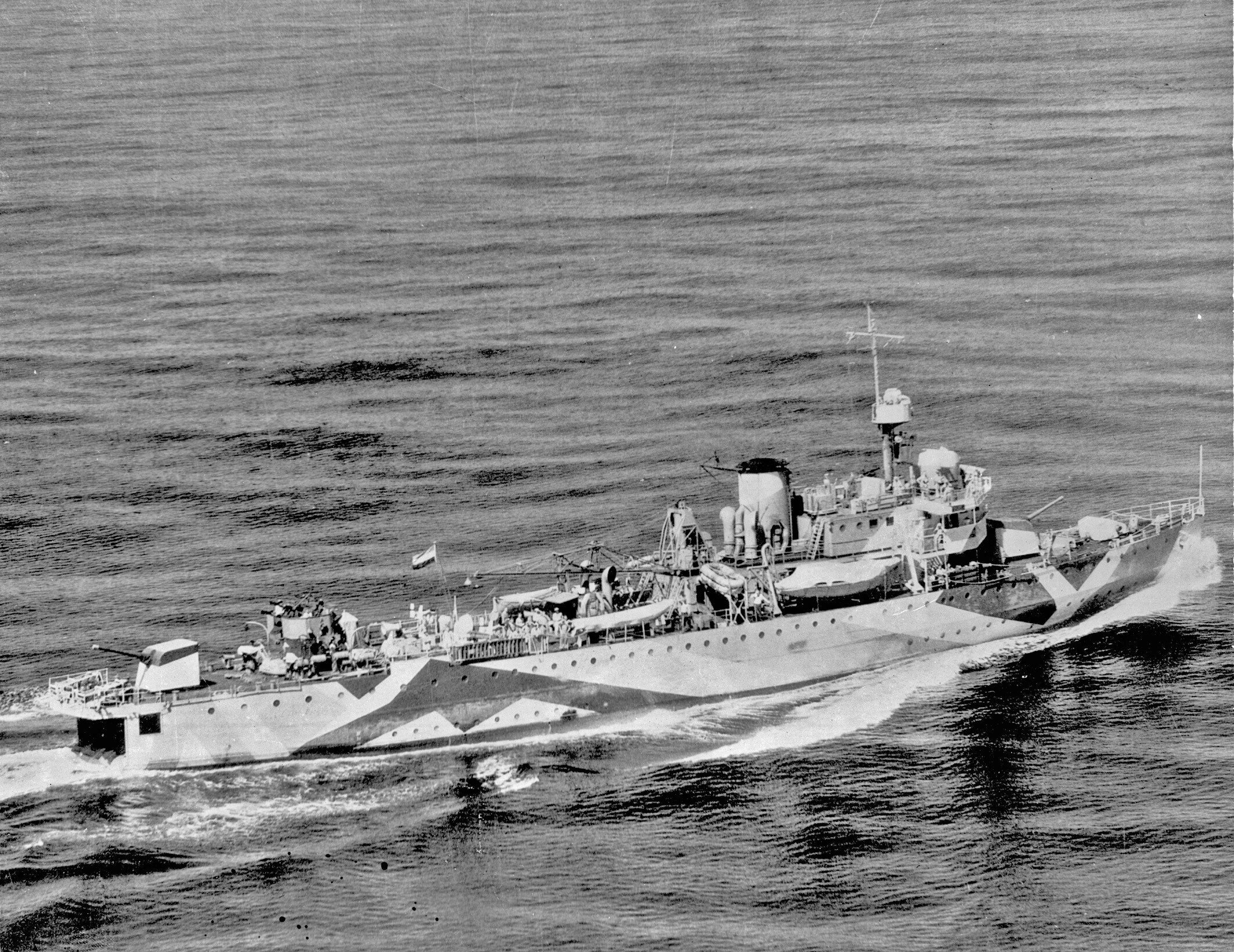
Willem van der Zaan in camouflage during war time, date unknown.

On 13 November Willem van der Zaan left Britain for the Netherlands East Indies. Her route took her to Ponta Delgada in the Azores, where two deserters jumped overboard as the ship set sail. One made it back to the occupied Netherlands, while the other drowned. From there she sailed to Freetown, then to Cape Town, Durban and Port Louis, arriving at Tanjung Priok, Batavia, on 14 January 1941. After an overhaul Willem van der Zaan was stationed in the Riouw Archipelago near Singapore, from early April. On 8 December 1941 after the war with Japan began she laid planned minefields until 19 December. From 23 December she was deployed as escort to merchant ships, and was overhauled at Surabaya at the end of the month.

On 7 January 1942 she escorted the steamer Van Rees near Tjilatjap. The Van Rees was sunk the next day by the I-56. On the 9th she rescued 24 survivors from the KPM steamer Van Riebeeck, sunk by I-56 the same day. On the 10th she attacked an ASDIC contact with depth charges, claiming a submarine sunk, though post-war analysis showed no submarines lost on that date. On 19 January Willem van der Zaan and other Dutch minelayers were deployed on an unsuccessful anti-submarine sweep looking for the I-56, which had been fought off by the Dutch merchant ship Japara with her deck gun earlier in the day. From 21 to 24 February she was deployed as a convoy escort. On the 26th she escorted the American seaplane tender Langley, until relieved by the destroyers Whipple and Edsall. On 1 March 1942, as the military situation on Java rapidly deteriorated, Willem van der Zaan escaped to Colombo, arriving on the 9th and joining the British Royal Navy's East Indies Station. On 22 April 1942 she sailed in company with the Dutch submarine K-14 to repair at Bombay, arriving on the 26th. Willem van der Zaan returned to Colombo, and was deployed as a convoy escort in the Indian Ocean for the next 2½ years, operating between Colombo, India, and the Persian Gulf, steaming 152,750 miles and escorting 2,148,835 GRT of Allied shipping.

In October 1944 she sailed for the UK via the Suez Canal and Gibraltar, arriving at London on 16 November. After repairs and maintenance at Eastern Dock, Shadwell Basin, she was towed to Royal Albert Dock for further work, which lasted until 3 March 1945. She then took part in "Operation Buttermilk", intended to close British coastal waters to German submarines. Willem van der Zaan laid 16 mine barrages between 19 March and 5 May, when she laid her last minefield of 102 mines in the English Channel, south of Worthing.

=== Post-war ===
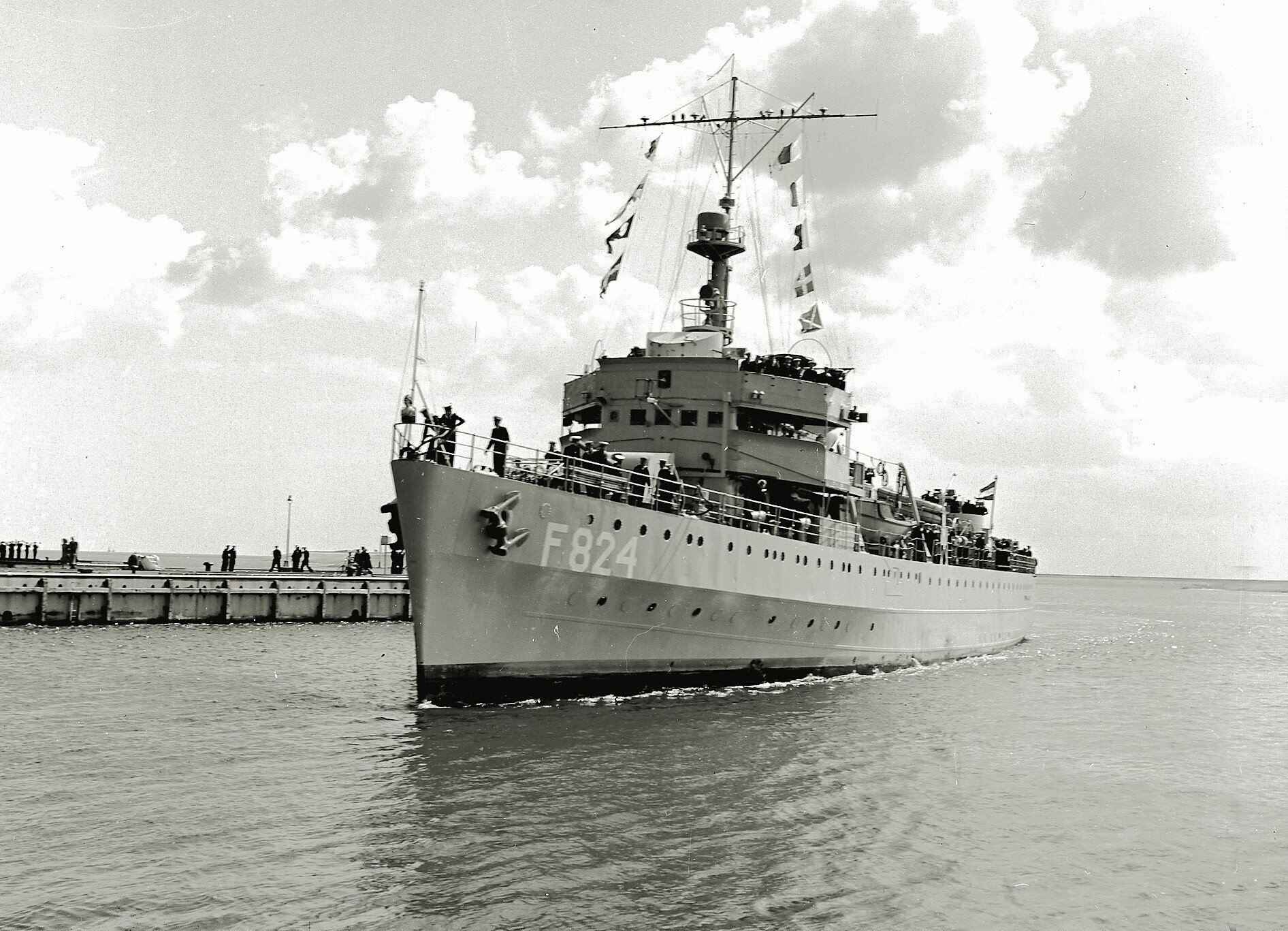
Willem van der Zaan in 1956

Willem van der Zaan remained at Portsmouth until 23 May 1945. She returned to Shadwell on the 24th, then escorted three LCI to Ostend, arriving there on 29 May, four years and 16 days after she was forced to leave. The next day she sailed to Rotterdam, remaining there until 6 August, when she returned to Shadwell, to be prepared for detachment to the Netherlands East Indies. She sailed on 2 September 1945, arriving back at Tanjung Priok on 8 October. There she was deployed on patrols, and transported former POW's, before returning to Rotterdam on 7 June 1946. She served in the Netherlands East Indies again between March 1947 and July 1948, and was then stationed in the Dutch West Indies until January 1950. She was rebuilt and recommissioned as a frigate (renumbered F824) in 1950, serving until early 1961 when she was berthed at Vlissingen to serve as accommodation and repair ship for the Mijnendienst ("Mine Service"). Willem van der Zaan was renumbered A880 in September 1963, and finally decommissioned on 27 February 1970. She was sold to Stolk's Handelsonderneming in Hendrik-Ido-Ambacht for scrapping on 6 October 1970 for 205,510 guilder.
