= Prins van Oranje-class minelayer =

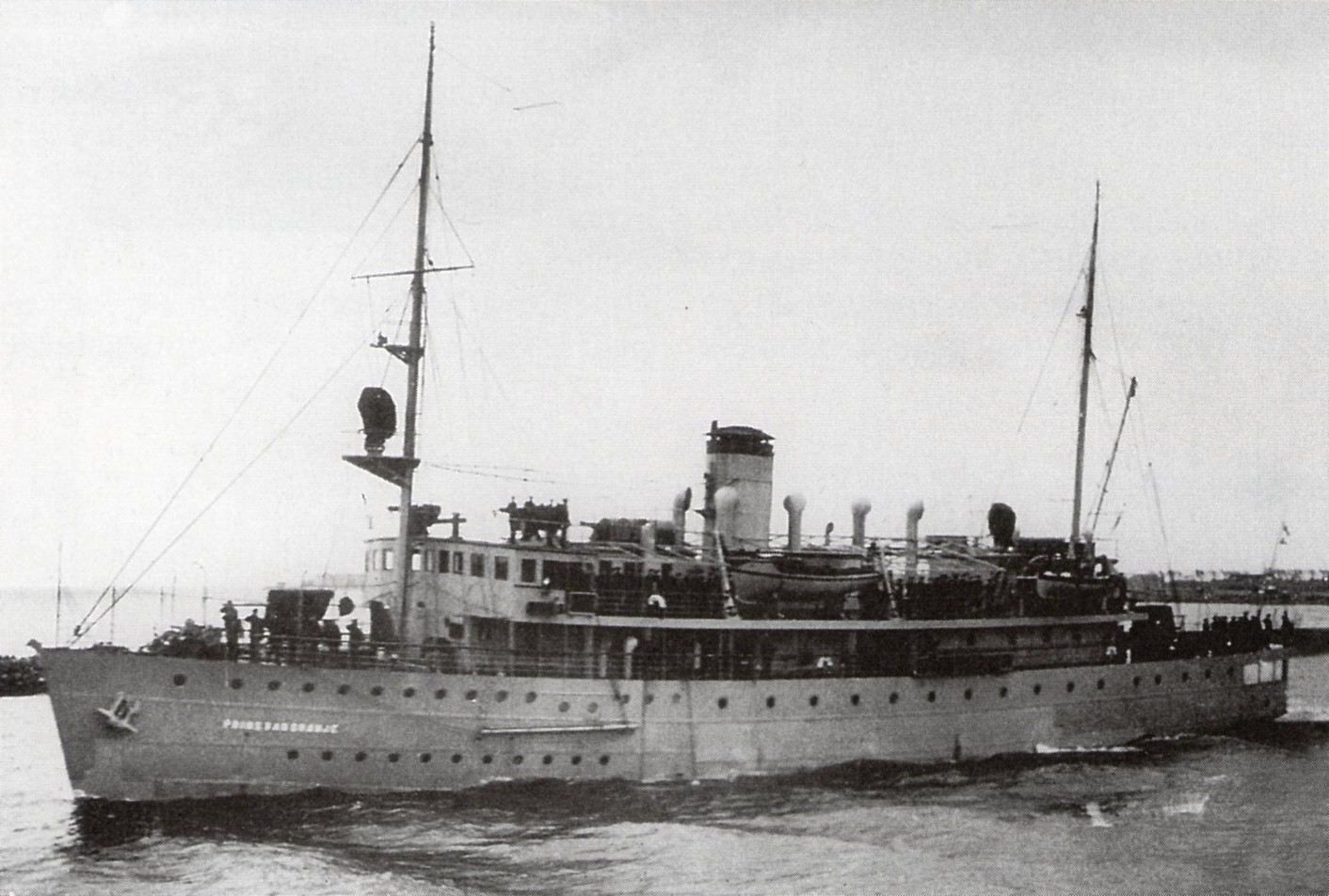
- Prins van Oranje

Class overview
- Name: Prins van Oranje class
- Builders: De Maas, Slikkerveer
- Operators: Royal Netherlands Navy
- Built: 1930–1932
- In commission: 1932–1942
- Completed: 2
- Lost: 2

General characteristics
- Type: Minelayer
- Displacement: 1,291 long tons (1,312 t) (full load)
- Length: 66 m (216 ft 6 in) (pp)
- Beam: 11 m (36 ft 1 in)
- Draught: 3.2 m (10 ft 6 in)
- Installed power: boilers; 1,750 ihp (1,305 kW)
- Propulsion: 2 shafts; 2 vertical triple expansion engines
- Speed: 15 knots (28 km/h; 17 mph)
- Complement: 121
- Armament: 2 × single 75 mm (3 in) AA guns; 2 × single 40 mm (1.6 in) Bofors AA guns; 2 × single 12.7 mm (0.50 in) machine guns; 150 naval mines

The Prins van Oranje class consisted of two minelayers built for the Royal Netherlands Navy during the 1930s, intended to serve in the Dutch East Indies. Completed in 1932, both ships were stationed there when the Pacific War began in December 1941. Prins van Oranje was sunk by a Japanese destroyer in January 1942 and her sister ship, Gouden Leeuw was scuttled as a blockship when Dutch forces surrendered in March.

== Description ==
The Prins van Oranje-class ships displaced 1,291 long tons (1,312 t) at deep load. They measured 66 metres (216 ft 6 in) long between perpendiculars with a beam of 11 m (36 ft 1 in) and a draught of 3.6 m (11 ft 10 in). The minelayers were powered by a pair of triple-expansion steam engines, each turning a propeller shaft. Their boilers provided enough steam for the engines to produce a total of 1,750 indicated horsepower (1,300 kW). The vessels had a maximum speed of 15 knots (28 km/h; 17 mph). They had a complement of 121 officers and ratings.

The Prins van Oranje class were armed with a pair of single-mounted 75-millimetre (3 in) anti-aircraft (AA) guns on single mounts positioned fore and aft of the superstructure. They were also armed with two 40-millimetre (1.6 in) Bofors AA guns and a pair of 12.7-millimetre (0.50 in) machine guns on single mounts. They carried 121 naval mines.

== Ships in class ==
The ships were built by the De Maas shipyard in Slikkerveer.

- HNLMS Prins van Oranje (1932–1942)
- HNLMS Gouden Leeuw (1932–1942)

== Service histories ==
After the Pacific War began on 8 December 1941, the sisters were employed laying defensive minefields throughout East Indian waters. Prins van Oranje was sunk by the Japanese destroyer Yamakaze and the patrol boat P-38 off Tarakan on 12 January 1942. Gouden Leeuw was scuttled as a blockship off Surabaya, Java, on 7 March when the Dutch forces in the East Indies surrendered.

== Bibliography ==
- Mark, Chris (1997). Schepen van de Koninklijke Marine in W.O. II (in Dutch). De Alk. ISBN 90-6013-522-9.
- Roberts, John (1980). "The Netherlands". In Chesneau, Roger (ed.). Conway's All the World's Fighting Ships 1922–1946. Conway Maritime Press. pp. 385–396. ISBN 0-85177-146-7.
- van Willigenburg, Henk (2010). Dutch Warships of World War II. Lanasta. ISBN 978-90-8616-318-2.
