= HNLMS Johan Maurits van Nassau (1932) =

Dutch gunboat

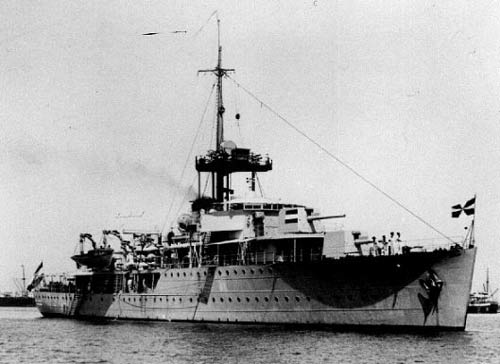
- HNLMS Johan Maurits van Nassau

History

Netherlands
- Name: Johan Maurits van Nassau
- Namesake: John Maurice, Prince of Nassau-Siegen
- Builder: Koninklijke Maatschappij De Schelde, Vlissingen
- Laid down: 17 July 1931
- Launched: 20 August 1932
- Commissioned: 5 April 1933
- Fate: Sunk, 14 May 1940

General characteristics
- Type: Gunboat
- Displacement: 1,457 long tons (1,480 t) (standard); 1,793 long tons (1,822 t) (full load)
- Length: 78.7 m (258 ft 2 in)
- Beam: 11.5 m (37 ft 9 in)
- Draught: 3.6 m (11 ft 10 in)
- Installed power: 2,100 ihp (1,600 kW)
- Propulsion: 2 × triple expansion steam engines; 4 × Yarrow boilers; 2 × screws
- Speed: 15 kn (28 km/h; 17 mph)
- Complement: 124
- Armament: 3 × 150 mm (5.9 in) No. 7 guns; 2 × 40 mm (1.57 in) anti-aircraft guns; 4 × .50 in (12.7 mm) machine guns; 3 × .303 in (7.70 mm) machine guns
- Armour: Armour deck: 25 mm (0.98 in); Conning tower: 25 mm (0.98 in); Turrets: 25 to 40 mm (0.98 to 1.57 in)
- Aircraft carried: 1 × floatplane

HNLMS Johan Maurits van Nassau (Dutch: Hr.Ms. Johan Maurits van Nassau), named after John Maurice of Nassau, was a Dutch gunboat that served in the early part of World War II, when it was sunk. She was the sole ship of her class, which was developed from the earlier Flores class.

== Service history ==
When the war broke out, Johan Maurits van Nassau was in the West Indies due to be relieved by the new gunnery training ship Van Kinsbergen, allowing Johan Maurits van Nassau to return to the Netherlands. On 10 May 1940, the day the Germans launched their invasion, she was stationed as a search and guard vessel at Vlissingen, where she immediately was targeted by German aircraft, of which she shot down one. She remained in the area for a couple of days and was then ordered to bombard the Dutch aerodrome at Waalhaven in Rotterdam, which had been occupied by German paratroopers. She arrived in Hook of Holland, but after the loss of the destroyer Van Galen during her attempt to do the same, the operation—of which Flores was also part—was cancelled.

As part of the Battle of the Afsluitdijk, Johan Maurits van Nassau was ordered by Den Helder on 12 May 1940 to silence a German battery near the Afsluitdijk, and on 14 May, she bombarded the German battery (consisting of 88 mm (3.46 in) guns of the 1. Kavalleriedivision) at a range of about 18 km (11 mi) and silenced them. Her advanced fire control system enabled great accuracy. Despite fierce retaliation by German aircraft, she remained undamaged, to the great surprise of all.

The war in the Netherlands was, however, coming to an end, and the independent role of the Dutch Navy was over. There was a general evacuation of personnel and ships, and Johan Maurits van Nassau left Den Helder on 14 May with the minelayers HNLMS Jan van Brakel, Douwe Aukes and Nautilus, and the torpedo boats G 13 and G 15. In the afternoon, about 16 km (10 mi) west of Callantsoog, they were attacked by German aircraft. Johan Maurits van Nassau—the largest vessel in the convoy—was the main target. Johan Maurits van Nassau received two or three hits, one of which caused a fire near an ammunition stack. The crew were ordered to abandon ship: 17 crewmen were killed. Later, most surviving crewmembers were transported back to Den Helder by the rescue ship Dorus Rijkers, but some continued to England aboard the remaining ships.

The wreck lies in 20 m (66 ft) of water in position 52°50′13″N 4°33′56″E.
