= HNLMS Prins van Oranje =

Dutch minelayer

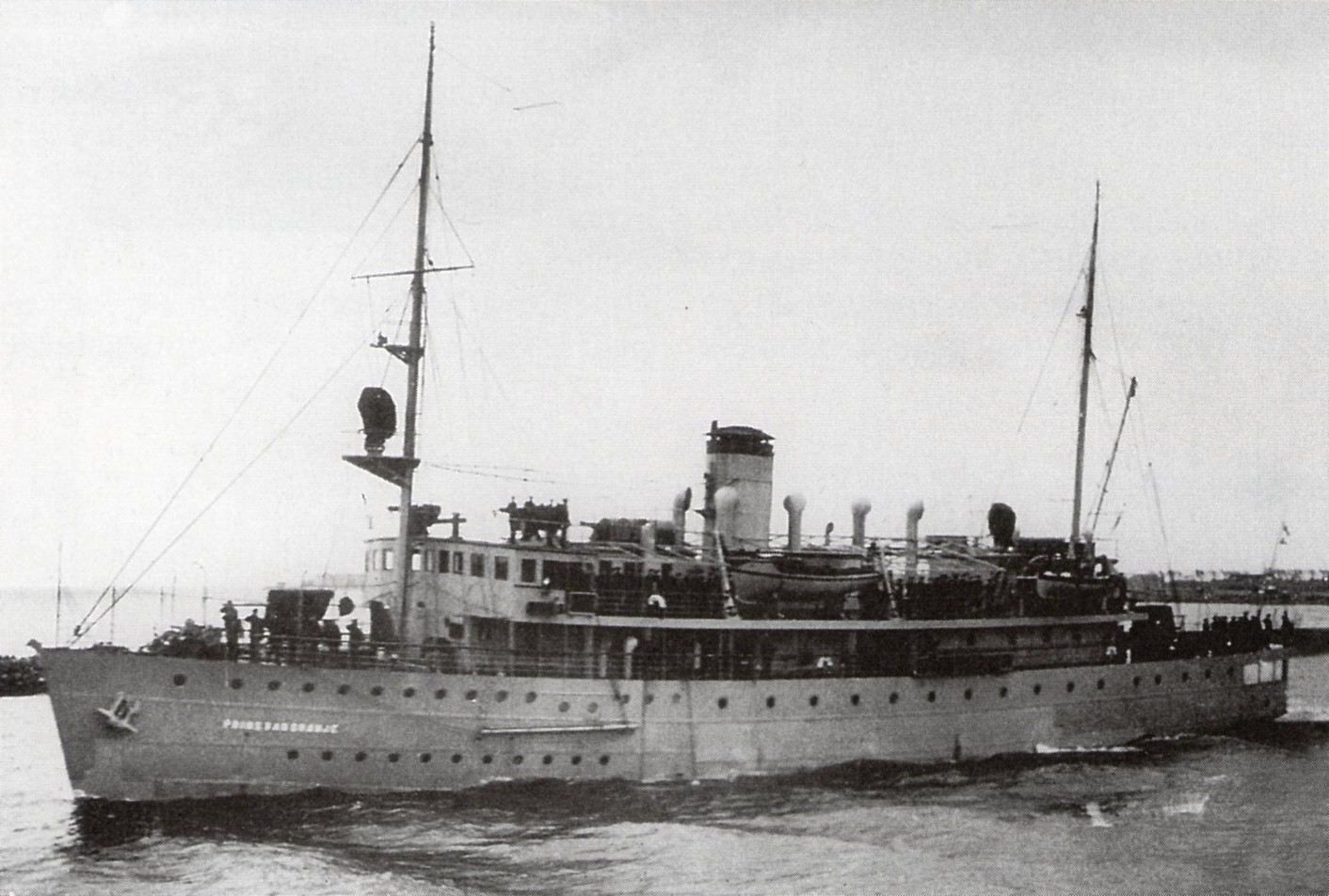
- Prins van Oranje

History

Netherlands
- Name: Prins van Oranje
- Builder: N.V. Internationale Scheepsbouw Mij. 'De Maas'
- Laid down: 20 September 1930
- Launched: 10 July 1931
- Commissioned: 2 February 1932
- Nickname(s): Willem de Zwijger
- Fate: Sunk by gunfire, 12 January 1942

General characteristics
- Class & type: Prins van Oranje-class minelayer
- Displacement: 1,291 long tons (1,312 t) (full load)
- Length: 66 m (216 ft 6 in) (pp)
- Beam: 11 m (36 ft 1 in)
- Draught: 3.2 m (10 ft 6 in)
- Installed power: boilers; 1,750 ihp (1,305 kW)
- Propulsion: 2 shafts; 2 vertical triple expansion engines
- Speed: 15 knots (28 km/h; 17 mph)
- Complement: 121
- Armament: 2 × single 75 mm (3 in) AA guns; 2 × single 40 mm (1.6 in) Bofors AA guns; 2 × single 12.7 mm (0.50 in) machine guns; 150 naval mines

The Prins van Oranje was the lead ship of her class of two minelayers built for the Royal Netherlands Navy during the 1930s and were intended to serve in the Dutch East Indies. Completed in 1932, the ship was stationed there when the Pacific War began in December 1941. Prins van Oranje was sunk by a Japanese destroyer and a patrol boat in January 1942.

== Description ==
The Prins van Oranje-class ships displaced 1,291 long tons (1,312 t) at deep load. They measured 66 metres (216 ft 6 in) long between perpendiculars with a beam of 11 m (36 ft 1 in) and a draught of 3.6 m (11 ft 10 in). The minelayers were powered by a pair of triple-expansion steam engines, each turning a propeller shaft. Their boilers provided enough steam for the engines to produce a total of 1,750 indicated horsepower (1,300 kW). The vessels had a maximum speed of 15 knots (28 km/h; 17 mph). They had a complement of 121 officers and ratings.

The Prins van Oranje class were armed with a pair of single-mounted 75-millimetre (3 in) anti-aircraft (AA) guns on single mounts positioned fore and aft of the superstructure. They were also armed with two 40-millimetre (1.6 in) Bofors AA guns and a pair of 12.7-millimetre (0.50 in) machine guns on single mounts. They carried 121 naval mines.

The Prins van Oranje was the first ship of Royal Netherlands Navy that was equipped with a radio installation made by the Nederlandse Seintoestellen Fabriek. At first this installation did not have a good reputation among liaison officers, which resulted in the ship getting the nickname William the Silent (Dutch: Willem de Zwijger).

== Construction and career ==
Prins van Oranje was laid down on 20 September 1930 at the De Maas shipyard in Slikkerveer, launched on 10 July 1931 and commissioned on 2 February 1932. On 9 March 1932, the ship left the Netherlands for the Dutch East Indies. In December 1941, she laid a minefield near Tarakan. On 12 January 1942 Prins van Oranje laid an extensive minefield in Tarakan harbor that delayed the Japanese landing force for two days. She was caught by Japanese forces that night trying to escape from the harbour. The destroyer Yamakaze and patrol vessel Patrol Boat 38 sank Prins van Oranje with gunfire. The Japanese ships rescued five crewmen after the battle.

"At 2157, the Yamakaze, keeping guard on the waterway between the islands of Tarakan and Bunyu, spotted the silhouette of a ship, which looked like an enemy naval vessel. She gradually and secretly followed the latter up to the wider waters near the eastern exit of the waterway and maintained surveillance, while deliberately making such preparations as previously announcing all the [relevant] units the scheduled time of turning on the searchlights. At 2318, increasing her speed to 26 knots, she closed in on the [enemy] ship. At 2322, both ships almost simultaneously started firing, turning searchlights on each other at a distance of about 2 kilometers; the Yamakaze, along with Patrol Boat No. 38, which followed the former, sank the [enemy] ship at 2332. Every salvo of the main gun of the Yamakaze scored a direct hit on the ship from the beginning, whereas many of the enemy shells flew over, mostly passing above our heads. And the power of their searchlight was very small; [the enemy] was not a match for us at all. The engagement was one-sided to the end, and the enemy [ship], which tried to escape, sank in the end. The average firing distance was about 1,800 meters. At 2355, we lowered two cutters on the waters near the location of the sinking and rescued five men (including one engineer lieutenant junior grade), after which we immediately continued our patrol. The enemy ship was the HNLMS Prins van Oranje."

== Bibliography ==
- Mark, Chris (1997). Schepen van de Koninklijke Marine in W.O. II (in Dutch). De Alk. ISBN 90-6013-522-9.
- Roberts, John (1980). "The Netherlands". In Chesneau, Roger (ed.). Conway's All the World's Fighting Ships 1922–1946. Conway Maritime Press. pp. 385–396. ISBN 0-85177-146-7.
- Raven, G.J.A., ed. (1988). De kroon op het anker: 175 jaar Koninklijke Marine (in Dutch). Amsterdam: De Bataafsche Leeuw. ISBN 90-6707-200-1.
- van Willigenburg, Henk (2010). Dutch Warships of World War II. Lanasta. ISBN 978-90-8616-318-2.
- War History Office of the National Defense College of Japan (2018). Remmelink, William (ed.). The Operations of the Navy in the Dutch East Indies and the Bay of Bengal. Leiden, Netherlands: Leiden University Press. ISBN 978-90-8728-280-6.
