= Flores-class gunboat =

Class of Dutch gunboats

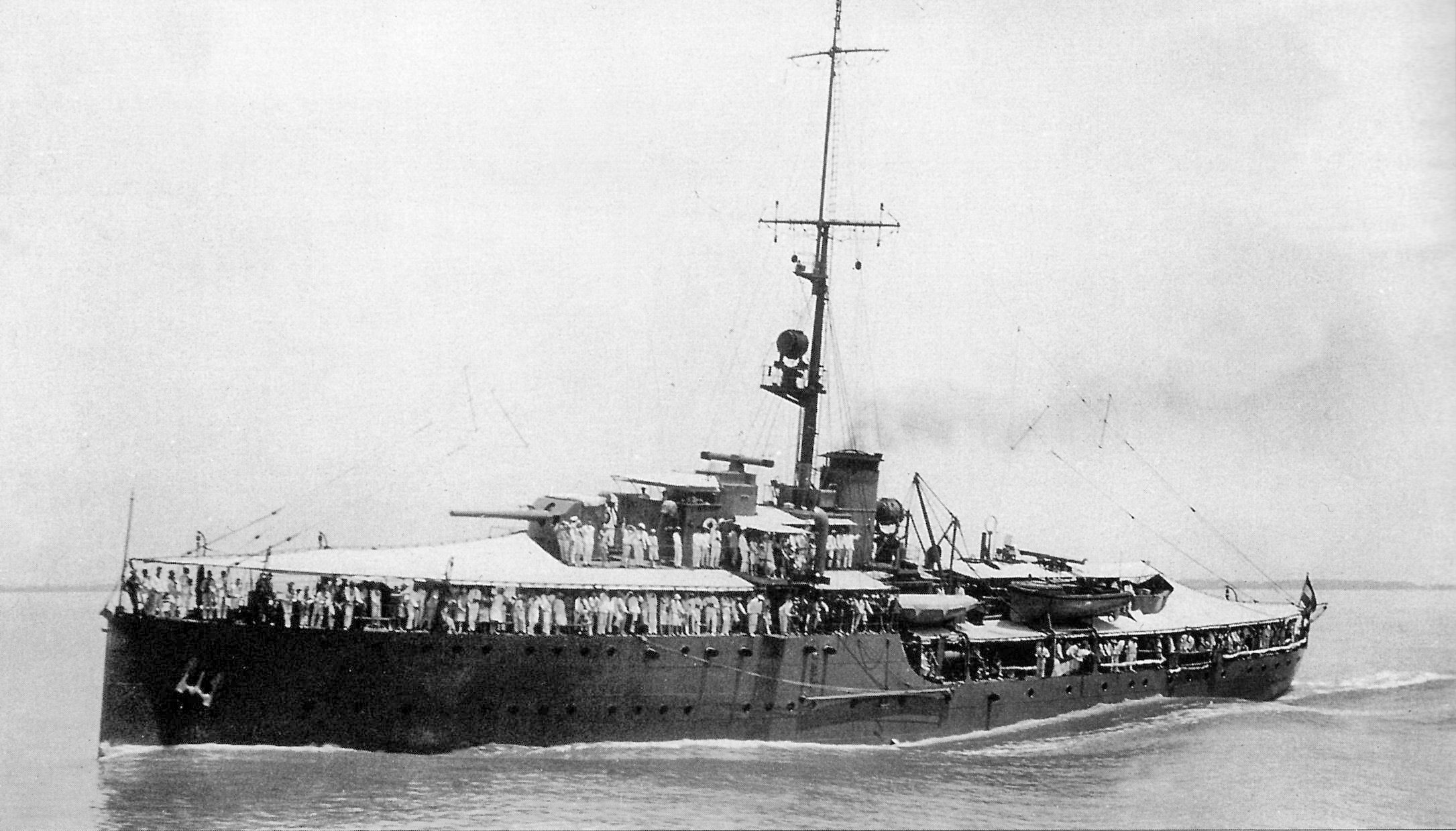
- Flores-class gunboat HNLMS Soemba

Class overview
- Operators: Royal Netherlands Navy
- Preceded by: Brinio class
- Succeeded by: Johan Maurits van Nassau
- Built: 1925–1926
- In commission: 1926–1956
- Completed: 2
- Scrapped: 2

General characteristics
- Type: Gunboat
- Displacement: 1,480 t (1,457 long tons) standard; 1,822 t (1,793 long tons) full load
- Length: 75.6 m (248 ft 0 in)
- Beam: 11.5 m (37 ft 9 in)
- Draught: 3.6 m (11 ft 10 in)
- Installed power: 1,500 kW (2,000 shp); 4 Yarrow boilers
- Propulsion: 2 shafts, 2 Triple-expansion steam engines
- Speed: 15 kn (28 km/h; 17 mph)
- Complement: 145
- Armament: As built: 3 × 150 mm (5.9 in) No. 7 guns; 1 × 75 mm gun; 4 × .50 Browning machine guns; Added to Flores: 1 × single 40 mm "pom-pom"; 4 × 20 mm Hotchkiss; 8 × .303 machine guns; Added to Soemba: 6 × Oerlikon 20 mm cannon
- Armour: Bridge: 50 mm (2.0 in); Deck: 25–50 mm (0.98–1.97 in); Ammunition hoists: 25 mm (0.98 in); Gun shields: 14–80 mm (0.55–3.15 in)

The Flores-class gunboats were a class of two gunboats built in the mid-1920s for the Royal Netherlands Navy. Flores and Soemba were intended to patrol the Dutch East Indies. During World War II, they served in the Royal Netherlands Navy. They were in several ways the most successful surface ships of the Dutch navy during the war.

They were squat ships, both commissioned in 1926, with a relatively heavy armament for their size (three 150 mm (5.9 in) Krupp guns, the same type and calibre as for the cruisers Java and Sumatra). Their main asset was an advanced fire control system that made them very accurate in bombarding shore targets, as a similar gunboat, Johan Maurits van Nassau, demonstrated in 1940 when she silenced a German battery from a distance of some 19 km (10 nmi).

== Construction ==
| Name | Laid down | Launched | Commissioned | Decommissioned |
|---|---|---|---|---|
| Flores | 13 January 1925 | 15 August 1925 | 25 March 1926 | 16 September 1968 |
| Soemba | 24 December 1924 | 24 August 1925 | 12 April 1926 | 9 June 1985 |

== Service history ==
Flores was brought back to the Netherlands at the start of World War II where she patrolled home waters until the Germans invaded in 1940. Slightly damaged, she escaped to Britain and was employed as a coastal escort. Soemba was withdrawn to Colombo in March 1942, before she could be captured or destroyed by the Japanese invasion of the East Indies.

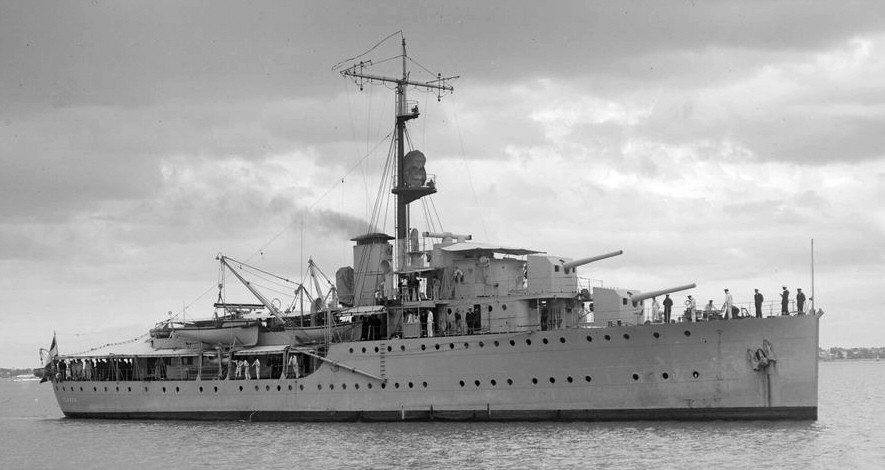
Gunboat Flores

Flores and Soemba were united in the Mediterranean Sea and played an active and successful role in the landings in Sicily, Salerno, Anzio, Garigliano, Gaeta and finally, at the beaches of Normandy in June 1944. The ships came under fire from shore based artillery and bombers many times, but survived all attacks, although they incurred damage several times. British war correspondents referred to them as "the Terrible Twins".

With their guns worn out due to intensive use, the two ships were retired from active duty shortly after the war and used for artillery instruction and as floating barracks. Soemba was converted to a radar training ship, most of her guns removed and enlarged superstructure fitted to house radar equipment and classrooms. On November 10, 1948, Flores and Soemba were awarded the Koninklijke Vermelding bij Dagorder.

Flores was decommissioned in 1968 and Soemba in 1986.

== Notes ==
=== References ===
- Cruijff, Henryk J. (2012). "HNLMS Soemba: Radar-Instruction Ship & Aircraft Direction Ship, 1946–1954". In John Jordan (ed.). Warship 2012. London: Conway. pp. 170–72. ISBN 978-1-84486-156-9.
- Lenton, H.T. (1968). Royal Netherlands Navy. Navies of the Second World War. Macdonald & Co.
- Mark, Chris (1997). Schepen van de Koninklijke Marine in W.O. II (in Dutch). Alkmaar: De Alk. ISBN 90-6013-522-9.
- Roberts, John (1980). "The Netherlands". In Chesneau, Roger (ed.). Conway's All the World's Fighting Ships 1922–1946. Greenwich, UK: Conway Maritime Press. pp. 385–396. ISBN 0-85177-146-7.
- van Willigenburg, Henk (2010). Dutch Warships of World War II. Lanasta. ISBN 978-90-8616-318-2.
- von Münching, L.L. (1978). Schepen van de Koninklijke Marine in de Tweede Wereldoorlog (in Dutch). Alkmaar: De Alk. ISBN 90-6013-903-8.
