= HNLMS Krakatau =

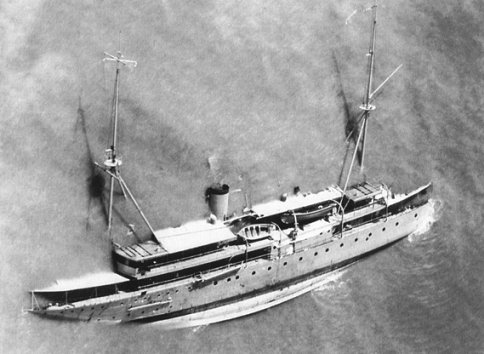
- Krakatau capsized in 1932

History

Netherlands
- Name: Krakatau
- Namesake: Krakatau
- Operator: Royal Netherlands Navy
- Builder: Marine Etablissement te Soerabaja
- Laid down: 3 February 1923
- Launched: 2 February 1924
- Commissioned: 11 December 1924
- Fate: Scuttled on 8 March 1942

General characteristics
- Type: Minelayer
- Displacement: 982 t (966 long tons)
- Length: 65 m (213 ft 3 in)
- Beam: 10.5 m (34 ft 5 in)
- Draught: 3.2 m (10 ft 6 in)
- Installed power: 2,500 ihp (1,900 kW)
- Propulsion: 1 Propeller; triple-expansion steam engine
- Speed: 15.5 knots (28.7 km/h; 17.8 mph)
- Crew: 91
- Armament: 2 × single 7.5 cm (3 in) AA guns; 4 × single 12.7 mm (0.50 in) machine guns; 150 mines

HNLMS Krakatau was a minelayer built for the Royal Netherlands Navy (RNN) in the Dutch East Indies during the 1920s. Completed in 1924, she played a minor role in the first year of the Pacific War. The ship was scuttled by her crew in early 1942 to prevent her capture by the Japanese.

== Description ==
Krakatau had a standard displacement of 982 long tons (998 t). She measured 65 metres (213 ft 3 in) long between perpendiculars with a beam of 10 m (32 ft 10 in) and a draught of 3.2 m (10 ft 6 in). The minelayer was powered by a triple-expansion steam engine that turned a single propeller shaft using steam from its coal-fired boilers to make 1,864 kilowatts (2,500 ihp) and give it a speed of 15.5 knots (28.7 km/h; 17.8 mph). The Krakatau had a complement of 91 officers and ratings. The ship was armed with two 75-millimetre (3 in) anti-aircraft guns and four 12.7-millimetre (0.50 in) machine guns. She carried 150 naval mines.

== Construction and career ==
Krakatau was laid down on 3 February 1923 and launched on 2 February 1924 at the Marine Etablissement te Soerabaja (MES). The ship was designed by the Dutch engineer R. O. Leegstra. After passing its sea trials in October 1924 Krakatau was commissioned on 11 December 1924. While the ship passed its sea trials, it did share a common flaw with other ships built at the MES at the time, namely stability problems. To counter this problem permanent ballast was added to the Krakatau, however, it did not manage to completely fix the stability problem of the ship.

On 11 October 1932 Krakatau capsized in the Oostervaarwater near Soerabaja. At the time the ship was doing a speed related exercise when it began taking water. It was theorized that this was the result of leaving the mine doors at the rear of the ship open. The increasing speed during the exercise would have led to high waves that would land on the rear of the ship, which could pour inside through the open doors. Eventually the water inside the ship gathered at one side of the ship and it slowly capsized. On 4 December 1932 Krakatau was re-floated and towed to the MES. There it was determined that the ship had taken minimal damage and would be fully repaired. The next year, on 4 September 1933, Krakatau was taken back into service.

=== Second World War ===
Between 19 and 20 February 1942 Krakatau acted as a motor torpedo boat tender for a division of motor torpedo boats and took part in the Battle of Badung Strait. Shortly after the battle the ship provided gasoline to motor torpedo boats in the Pangpang Baai. During this time it managed to stay hidden and unharmed, even when Japanese scouts and bombers flew over, as a result of its carefully applied camouflage.

On 8 March 1942 Krakatau was scuttled by its crew 500 meters from the dock (Note: In Dutch it is described as steiger.) of the Pyrotechnische Werkplaatsen in the Westervaarwater near Batoe Porron in Madoera. The ship was scuttled because there was not enough oil to make the journey to an Allied port and it was determined that it had not much fighting value as a warship. Afterwards the crew of the ship left for Kamal to continue the battle on land against the Japanese.
