= Japanese minesweeper W-9 =

Three Japanese minesweepers have been named No.9 minesweeper (第九号掃海艇, Dai Kyū Gō Sōkaitei, or "W-9"):

- Japanese minesweeper No. 9 (1928), ex-Japanese destroyer Ayanami (1909), a Kamikaze-class destroyer (1905) of the Imperial Japanese Navy in World War I
- Japanese minesweeper No. 9 (1930), ex-Japanese destroyer Nara (1918), an Enoki-class destroyer of the Imperial Japanese Navy in World War I
- Japanese minesweeper No. 9 (1938), a No.7-class minesweeper (1938) of the Imperial Japanese Navy in World War II

== See also ==
- Japanese auxiliary minesweeper No. 9, a No.1-class auxiliary minesweeper of the Imperial Japanese Navy in World War II
- JDS Minesweeping boat No. 9 (MSB-709), a MSB No.7-class minesweeping boat of the Japan Maritime Self-Defense Force
