= HNLMS Soemba (1925) =

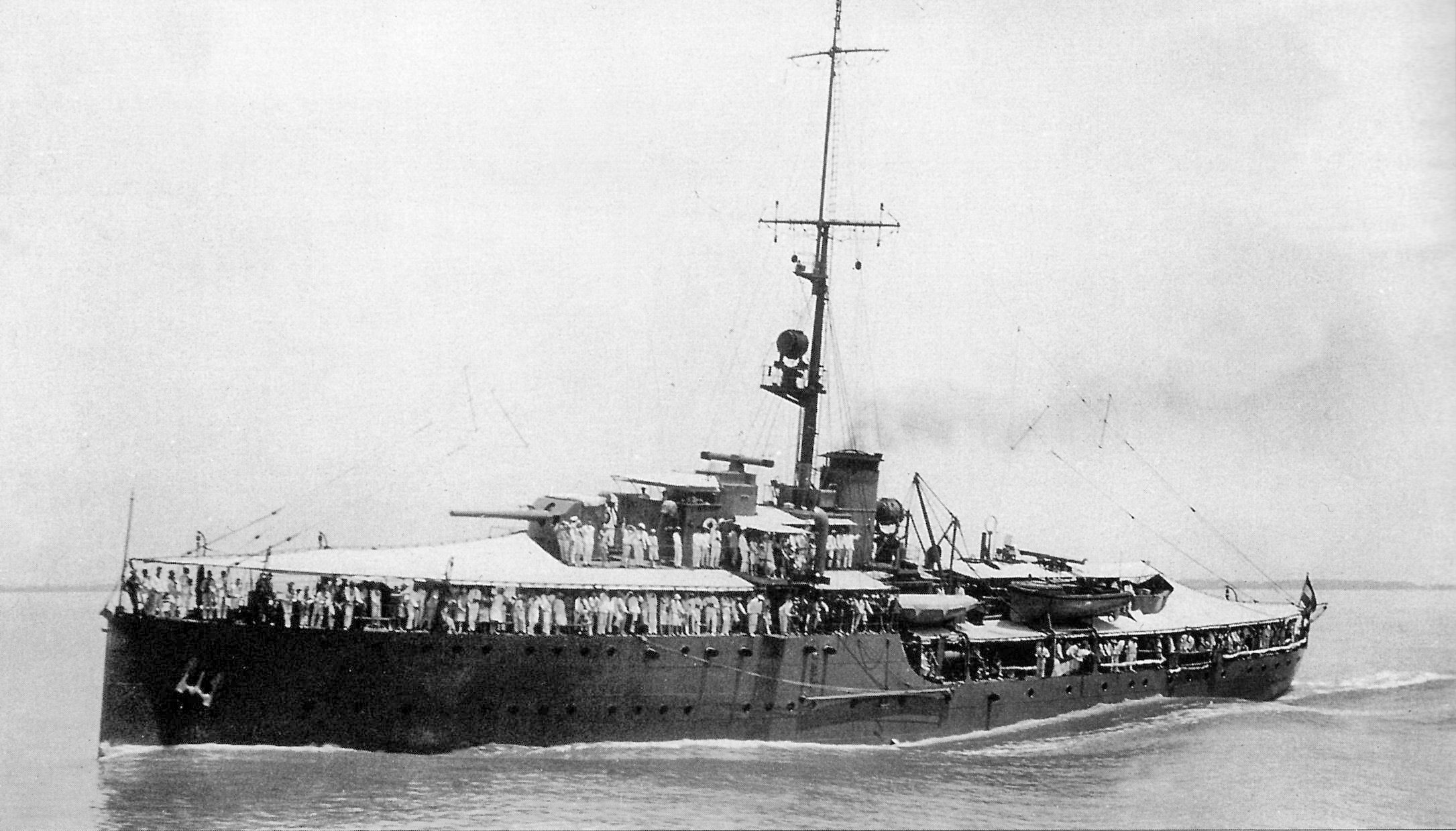
- Soemba c. 1930

History

Netherlands
- Name: Soemba
- Namesake: Sumba
- Builder: Wilton's Dok- en Werf Maatschappij, Schiedam
- Laid down: 24 December 1924
- Launched: 24 August 1925
- Commissioned: 12 April 1926
- Identification: Pennant numbers: T199, HX1, A891
- Fate: Scrapped 12 July 1985

General characteristics
- Class & type: Flores-class gunboat
- Displacement: 1,457 long tons (1,480 t) standard; 1,793 long tons (1,822 t) full load
- Length: 75.6 m (248 ft 0 in)
- Beam: 11.5 m (37 ft 9 in)
- Draught: 3.6 m (11 ft 10 in)
- Installed power: 2,000 shp (1,500 kW); 4 Yarrow boilers
- Propulsion: 2 shafts, 2 Triple-expansion steam engines
- Speed: 15 knots (28 km/h; 17 mph)
- Complement: 145
- Armament: As built: 3 × 5.9 in (150 mm) No. 7 guns; 1 × 75 mm gun; 4 × .50 Browning machine guns; Added: 6 × Oerlikon 20 mm cannon
- Armour: Bridge: 50 mm (2.0 in); Deck: 25–50 mm (0.98–1.97 in); Ammunition hoists: 25 mm (0.98 in); Gun shields: 14–80 mm (0.55–3.15 in)

HNLMS Soemba (Dutch: Hr.Ms. Soemba) was a Flores-class gunboat built in the mid-1920s for the Royal Netherlands Navy (Koninklijke Marine) to patrol the Dutch East Indies.

== Career ==
Soemba sailed for the East Indies shortly after her commissioning and remained there until the start of the Pacific War in 1941. The ship fought Japanese forces in and around the Sunda Strait during the collapse of the East Indies. She was among the covering naval forces during transport of troops bound for Malaya from RMS Aquitania at Ratai Bay, Sunda Strait to smaller transports beginning 20 January 1942.

On 16 February Soemba was with a small force at Oosthaven (now Bandar Lampung) that included the Australian ships HMAS Yarra, HMAS Goulburn and HMAS Burnie along with the British ships HMS Tenedos and HMS Encounter covering withdrawal of Allied forces from Sumatra. After evacuation Soemba remained in the port with Burnie to complete demolition of facilities that included destroying ammunition, rail equipment and placing depth charges under the Koninklijke Paketvaart-Maatschappij (KPM) wharf and a cargo shed as well as pouring sulphuric acid into the working parts and destroying propellers of four trucks of torpedoes. The ship was one of six Dutch ships joined with Australian corvettes in the Sunda Strait Auxiliary Patrol attempting to prevent Japanese infiltration of Java by small craft. On 27 February the ships came under air attack with Soemba suffering some casualties.

Soemba sailed for Ceylon in mid-March 1942. She spent most of the next year on patrol in the vicinity of the Persian Gulf until she was transferred to the Mediterranean in May 1943. Soemba provided naval gunfire support during the amphibious landings in Sicily, Salerno, and Anzio and escorted convoys until March 1944. That month the ship was transferred to Portsmouth to refit in preparation for the landings in Normandy in June. She was assigned for bombardment duties at Utah Beach, along with 17 other vessels.

In August Soemba was laid up as she was considered unfit for further duty, but the Dutch requested that she be refitted as a radar training ship at the end of 1944 to train Dutch personnel on all the different types of British radars used by Dutch ships. Consequently, the ship's armament was removed, the bridge enclosed and she was equipped with a Type 281 long-range air warning radar on the foremast, a Type 271 surface search radar above her bridge, a Type 291 air warning radar, also on the foremast, a Type 277 height-finding radar in front of the bridge, a Type 268 submarine radar on a pole mast amidships and a Type 293 radar on the mainmast at Grangemouth between May 1945 and May 1946.

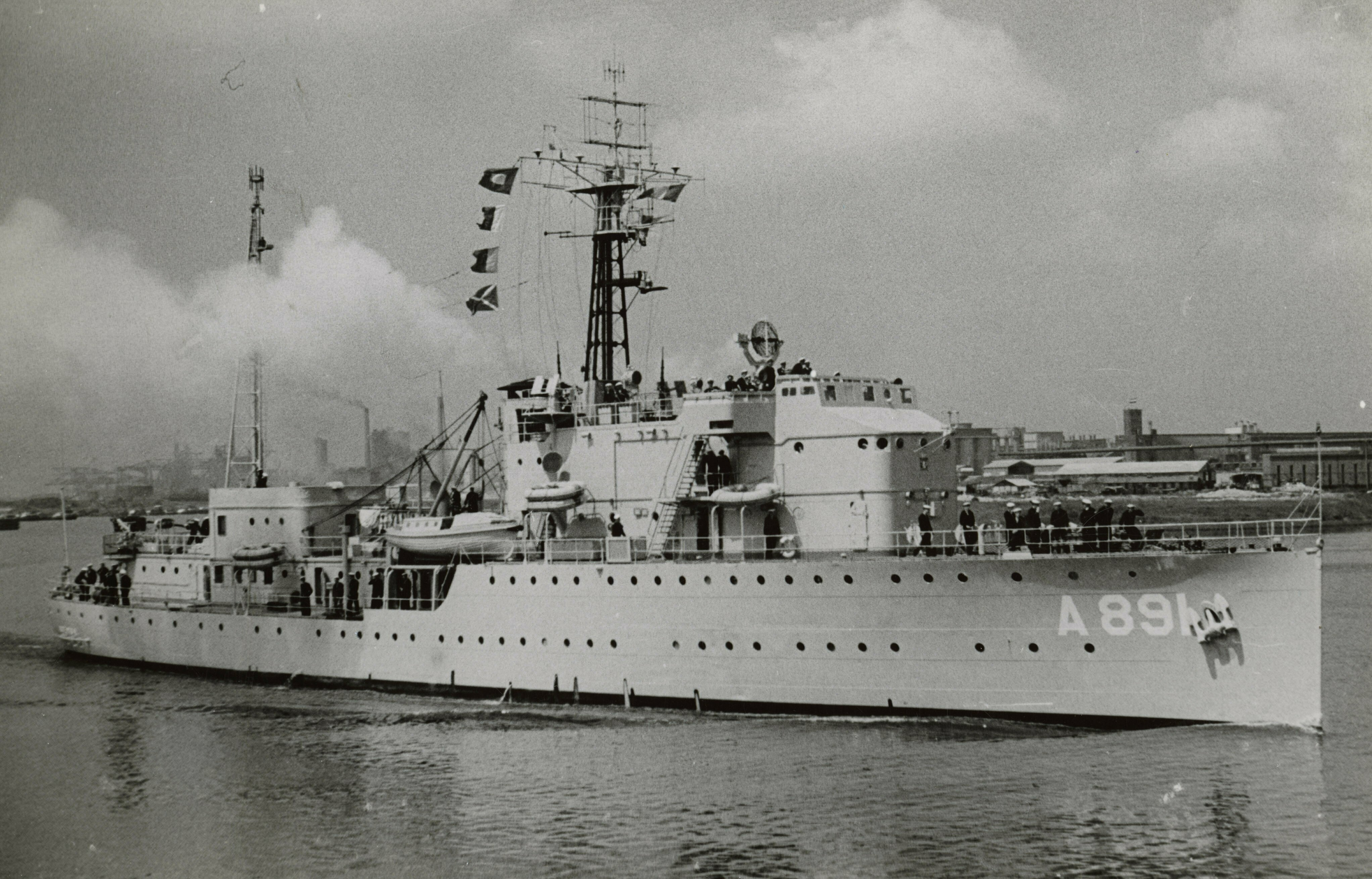
Soemba in the 1950s after her conversion

Soemba was decommissioned in October 1949 as sufficient training facilities now existed ashore and the ship was modified at Den Helder as an aircraft direction ship. She recommissioned in October 1952 after her armored conning tower was removed, her forward and aft superstructures enlarged and her masts were replaced by lattice masts. Single 20-millimeter Oerlikon cannon were installed on each side of her bridge and two 40-millimeter Bofors guns were added aft. All of her surface-related radars were removed and she was now equipped with a Type 281 on her foremast, a Type 277 above her forward superstructure and a Type 293 on the mainmast.

The ship participated in a number of NATO exercises from 1949 through 1954 and often worked with her British counterpart HMS Boxer during this time. Soemba was decommissioned again at the end of November 1954 and was converted into a barracks ship at Den Helder. She served in this role from 1956 until she was finally decommissioned in July 1985.
