= Slikkerveer =

Coordinates: 51°53′N 4°37′E

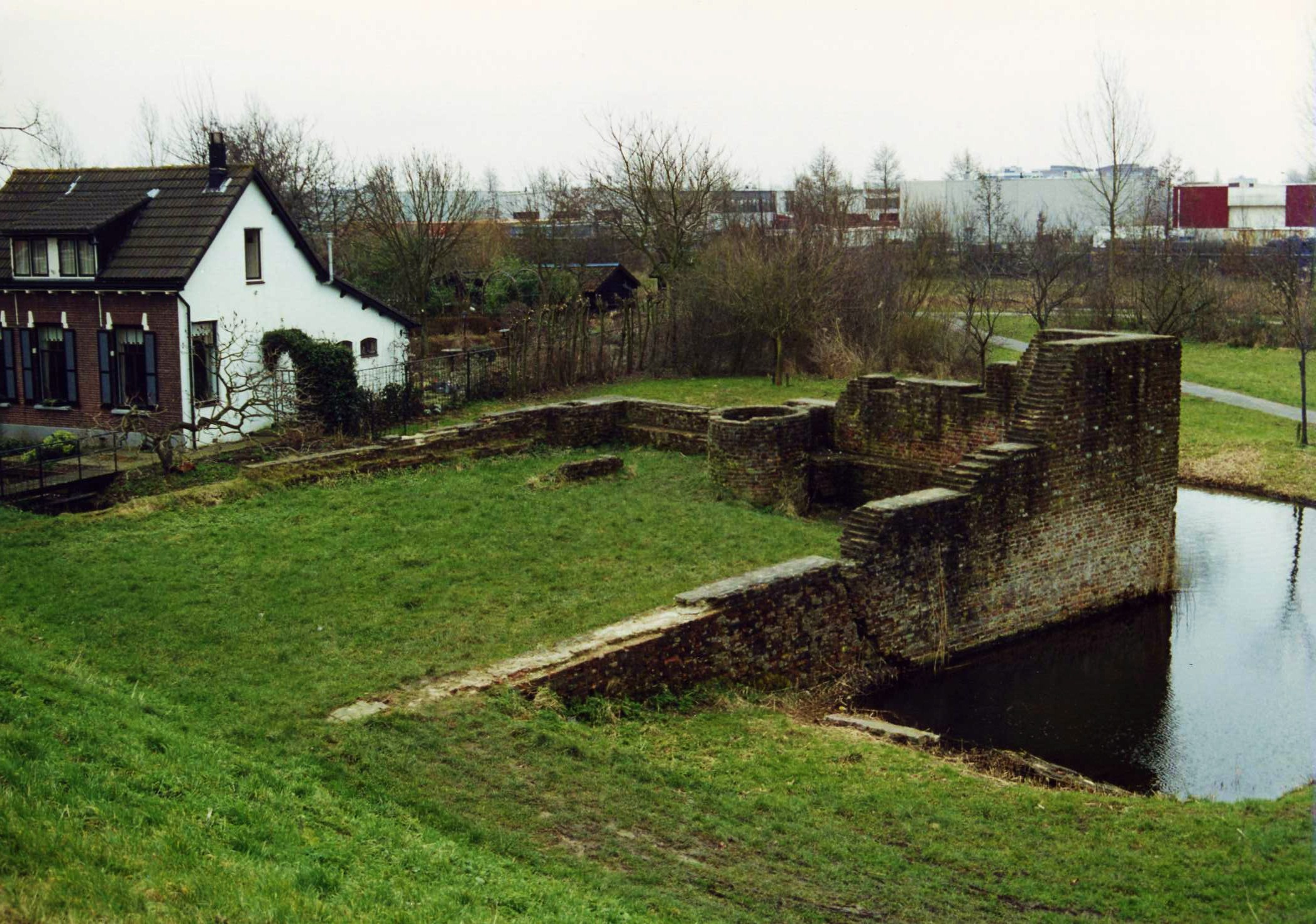
- Ruins of the Huys te Woude

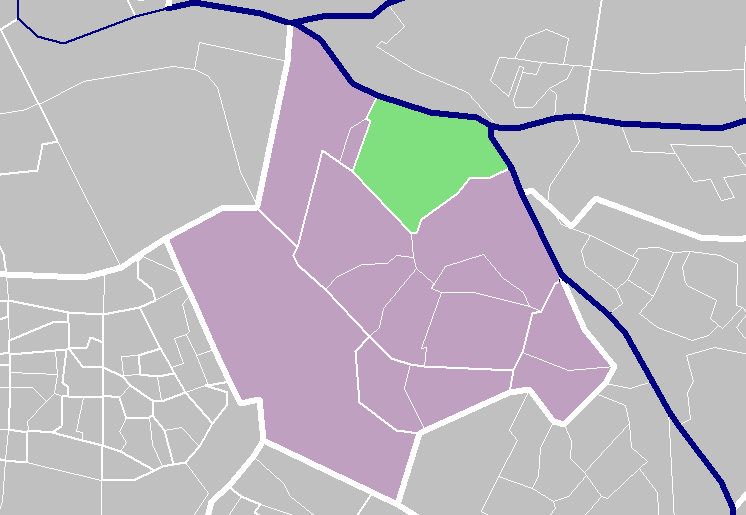
- Country: Netherlands
- Province: South Holland
- Municipality: Ridderkerk

Area
  - Total: 270 ha (670 acres)

Population (2007)
  - Total: 8,230

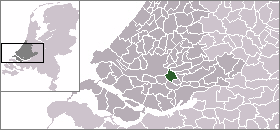
Location of the municipality of Ridderkerk

Slikkerveer is a village in the municipality of Ridderkerk, Netherlands. In 2004, 8550 people lived in Slikkerveer. It is located about 6 km east-southeast of the city of Rotterdam.
