= Aldok-1 =

Old floating dry dock in Gdańsk, Poland

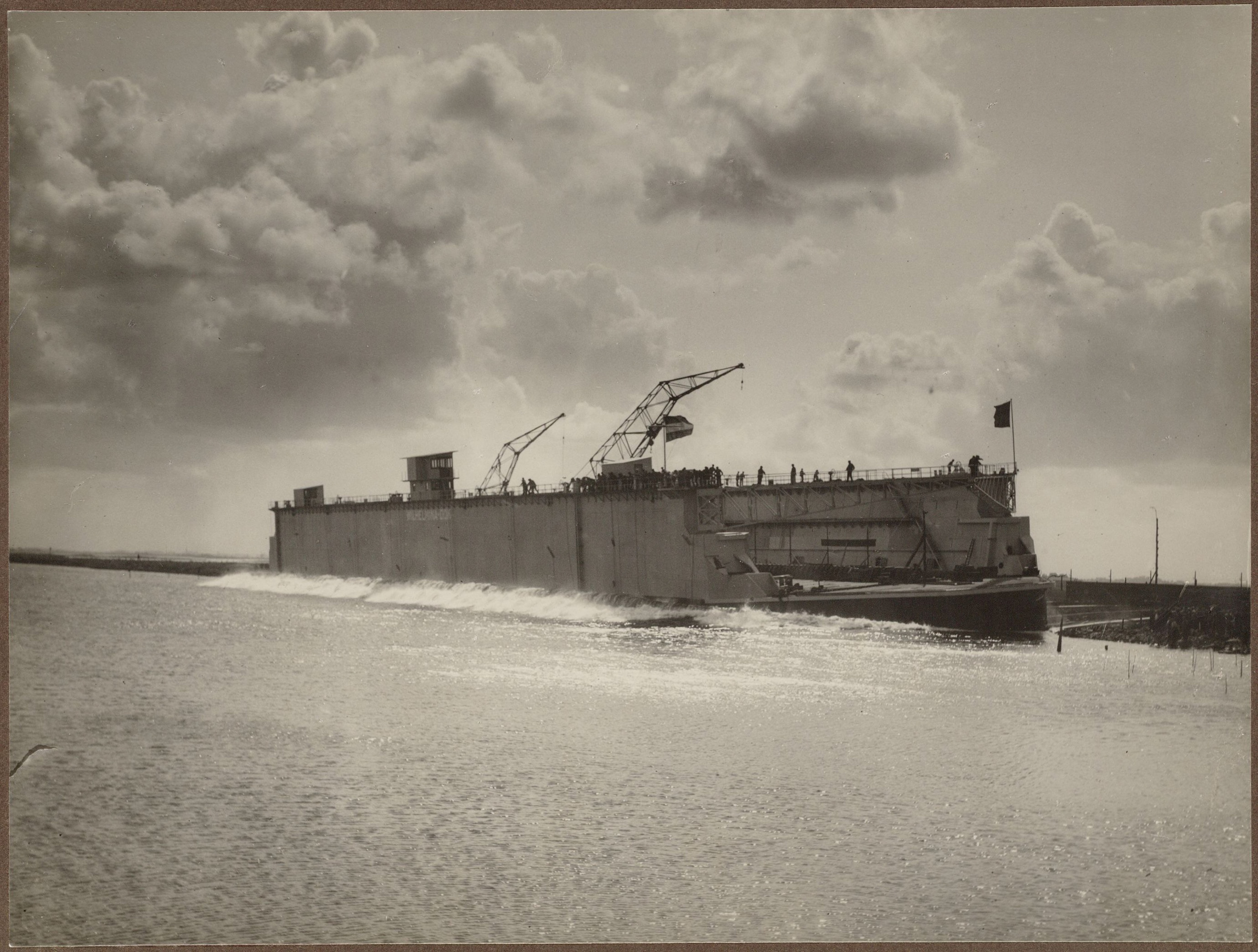
- Launch of Wilhelmina Drydock for Wilton in August 1915

History

Netherlands
- Name: Wilhelmina Drydock
- Builder: Nederlandsche Scheepsbouw Maatschappij (NSM)
- Launched: 31 August 1915
- Home port: Amsterdam

Poland
- Name: Aldok-1
- Acquired: 1998
- Fate: in use

General characteristics (as completed)
- Length: 510 ft 0 in (155.45 m) (Pontoons); 480 ft 0 in (146.30 m) (Sides); 400 ft 0 in (121.92 m) (Lifting side)
- Beam: 110 ft 0 in (33.53 m) (pontoons); 80 ft 0 in (24.38 m) (inside bottom); 92 ft 0 in (28.04 m) (inside top)
- Draft: 20 ft 6 in (6.25 m) (on blocks)
- Depth of hold: 14 ft 6 in (4.42 m) (center); 12 ft 6 in (3.81 m) (pontoon side)

Aldok-1 is an old drydock in Gdańsk, Poland. For most of its life it was known as Wilhelmina Drydock and/or Wilton's Dok 3. It was originally built for the Dutch ship repair company Wilton's Dok- en Werf Maatschappij in Delfshaven, Rotterdam.

In 1935, Wilhelmina Drydock was moved to Schiedam. During the world wars, Wilhelminadok was involved in some notable repair jobs. During World War II, it was heavily damaged.

Wilhelmina Drydock started as the pride of the Wilton shipyard. However, within a decade, it was outclassed by two much larger drydocks that Wilton acquired. When Wilton merged with Fijenoord to become Wilton-Fijenoord, it became even less important. After the demise of Wilton-Fijenoord, the dock was sold.

In 1999, the dry dock started work in Gdańsk as Aldok-1. Here, it was also used to launch ships that had been built on a horizontal slipway on shore. In late 2025, it was still used to repair ships.

== Context ==
After the opening of the Nieuwe Waterweg in 1872 and the industrial expansion in Germany, the Port of Rotterdam grew very fast. Several shipyards profited from the growing traffic. It also led to an increased demand for ship maintenance and repairs, which often required a drydock. In 1913, the Municipality of Rotterdam owned four drydocks. The largest of these was 170 m long and could lift 15,300t. The Rotterdamsche Droogdok Maatschappij had two dry docks of 133 and 91 m long.

In 1913 repair shipyard Wilton's Dok- en Werf Maatschappij had two drydocks of 129.5 m and 110 m length. Since it concentrated all its activities on a new location in Delfshaven, Wilton's had tripled its revenue in 10 years.

In Amsterdam, the Nederlandsche Scheepsbouw Maatschappij (NSM) had launched the large Surabaya Dock of 14,000 tons in June 1913. This had been built on a specially made construction site outside the Oranje Locks near Schellingwoude, so the 115 ft 0.625 in (35.07 m) wide drydock could leave Amsterdam via the Zuiderzee. NSM was of course keen to reuse this costly construction site, which was had e.g. required 1,200 piles as part of its foundation.

== Ordering and construction ==
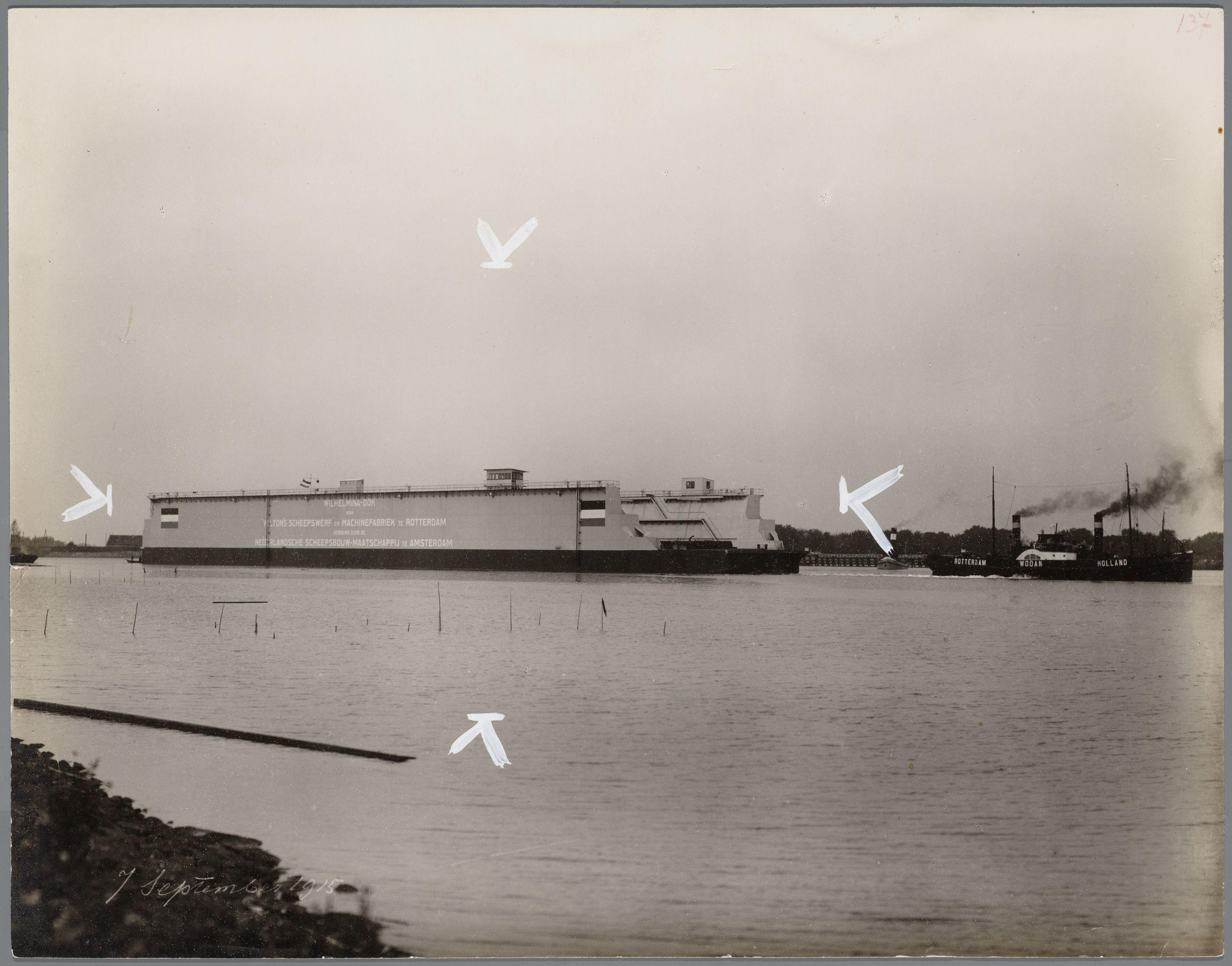
Wodan pulls Wilhelmina Drydock onto the Zuiderzee

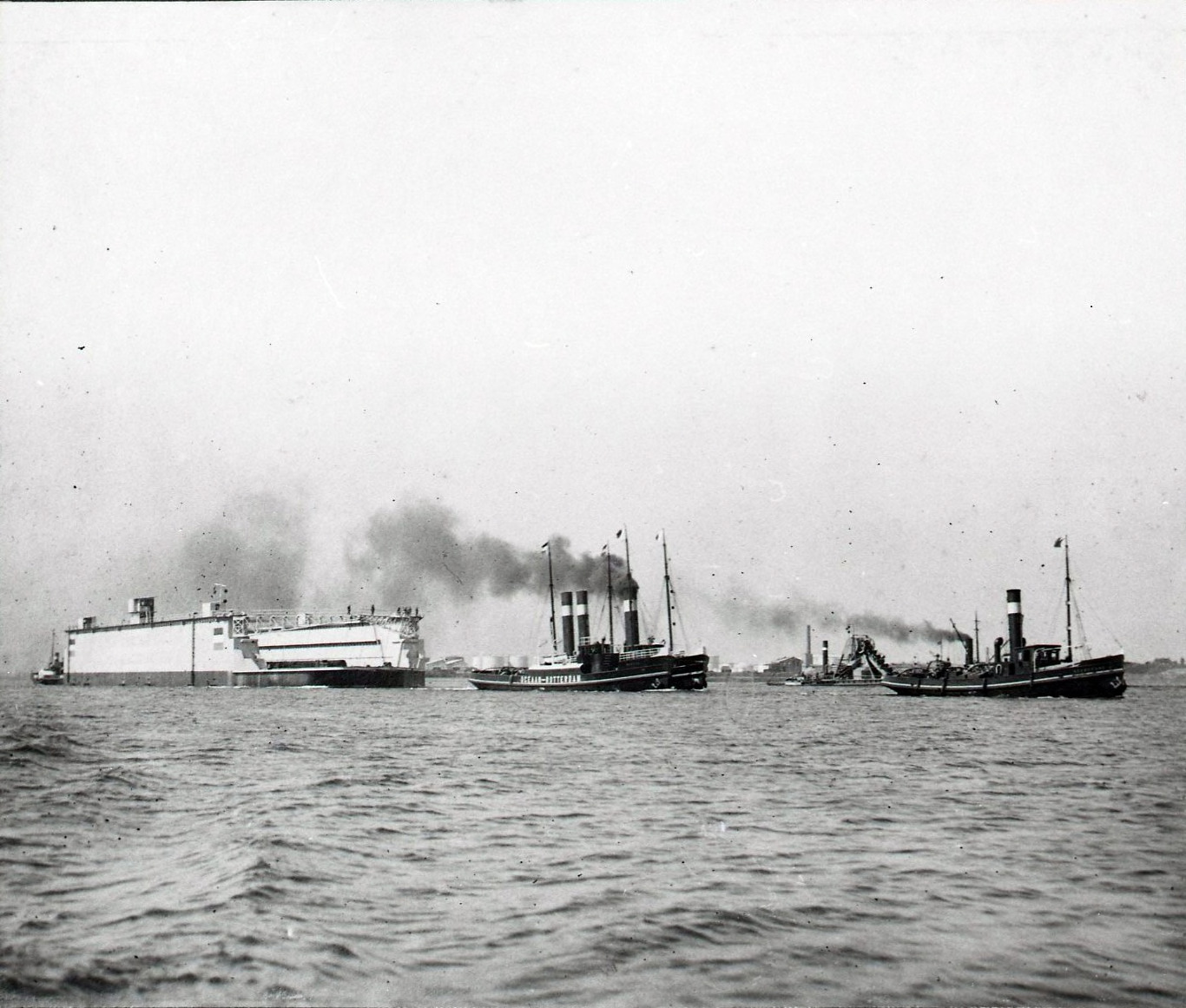
Arrival in Rotterdam in September 1915

In late December 1913, Wilton's Dok- en Werf Maatschappij (Wilton) ordered Wilhelmina Drydock at the Nederlandsche Scheepsbouw Maatschappij (NSM). It was to be 500 ft 0 in (152.40 m) long and to have a lift capacity of 13,000t. The delivery date was to be June 1915.

Actual construction of Wilhelminadok started in mid June 1914.

Several companies were involved in constructing Wilhelmina Drydock. Nederlandsche Scheepsbouw Maatschappij (NSM) was the main contractor. The frames were delivered by the Nederlandsche Fabriek van Werktuigen en Spoorwegmaterieel. Pipes were made by Louis Smulders Machine Factory Jaffa. The electrical equipment was made by Groeneveld van der Poll in Amsterdam.

On Tuesday 31 August 1915, Wilhelminadok was launched. This began by hydraulic presses developing pressure at 11 AM. At 11:30, the drydock moved down the slipway. In its passage, Mrs. M. Laming-Wilton daughter of the owner threw a bottle of champaign against the dock.

The next step would be for tugboats of L. Smit & Co to pull the drydock to Delfshaven. With an eye to encounters with submarines, the drydock had been painted with large Dutch flags. On 8 September, Smit's tugboat Wodan pulled the Wilhelminadok from Amsterdam to Nieuwediep with the assistance of two Amsterdam tugboats. In Nieuwediep, the tugs Poolzee and Wodan joined the convoi. It was expected in Rotterdam on the next day. At 8 AM of 9 September, the three tugs pulled Wilhelminadok onto the Nieuwe Waterweg.

== Characteristics ==
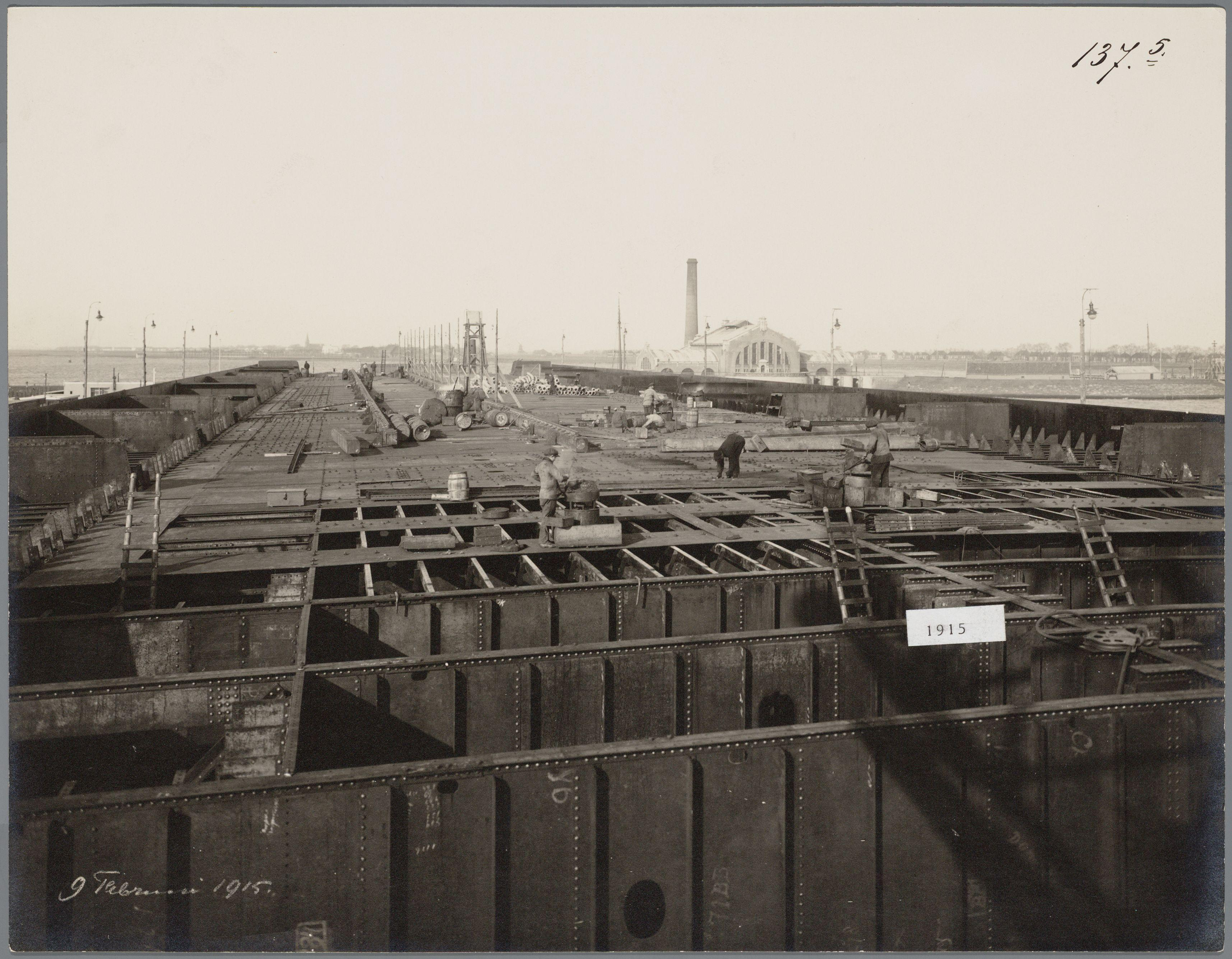
Under construction at Schellingwoude

Wilhelmina Drydock was built as a self-docking drydock that consisted of three sections. Each section could be lifted for maintenance and repair by the other two sections. The length of the pontoon was longer than that of the sides. The total overall length of the drydock was 510 ft 0 in (155.45 m), the total length of the sides was 480 ft 0 in (146.30 m). As built, each pointy endsection was 162 ft 6 in (49.53 m) long, but its not clear how this was measured. Each end-section had a separate really pointy end that seems to have disappeared later, also see photo of launch.

The beam of the drydock was 110 ft 0 in (33.53 m). In the center, the depth of hold of the pontoons was 14 ft 6 in (4.42 m). At the sides this was only 12 ft 6 in (3.81 m). The part of the sides that helped to lift the drydock was 400 ft 0 in (121.92 m) long. The sides were 15 ft 0 in (4.57 m) wide at the pontoon level and 9 ft 0 in (2.74 m) wide at the top. On the outside, the sides were 29 ft 0 in (8.84 m) higher than the pontoon was.

The inner dimensions of the drydock can be calculated from the width of the sides. The inner width at the bottom was (110–30) = 80 ft 0 in (24.38 m). At the top it was (110–18) = 92 ft 0 in (28.04 m). The amount of water on the blocks was 20 ft 6 in (6.25 m). The height of the keel blocks was 4 ft 0 in (1.22 m)

There is a description of how the sections of the drydock were attached to each other. This differed between the bottom of the pontoon and outside of the sides and the top of the pontoon and inner side of the sides. On the outside the connection was made by angle steels of 5 ft 5 in (1.65 m) by 5 ft 5 in (1.65 m) by 0.75 in (0.019 m) which were connected to each other by 1.5 in (0.038 m) bolts. Here, the hull was doubled. The plating of the center section was 0.75 in (0.019 m) shorter, leaving a space that was made watertight by filling it with rubber and then sealed. On the inside, the connection was made by a lesser number of angle steels and simple plating.

As built, Wilhelmina Drydock had three centrifugal pumps with vertical a axle of 90 hp. These could work together or independently. There were also three smaller pumps that each had a 35 hp engine. As built, Wilhelmina Drydock could lift 12.500 to 13.000t. A ship of 10.000t could be lifted in 2.5 hours.

On the inside of the sides, there were two lines to attach scaffolding for walking and painting. The top of the sides was widened by a wooden deck sticking out on the outside. There were keel blocks at 2 ft 6 in (0.76 m) distance from each other. There were 12 bilge blocks, and 12 shoring beams.

== Service in Rotterdam and Schiedam ==
=== In Delfshaven ===
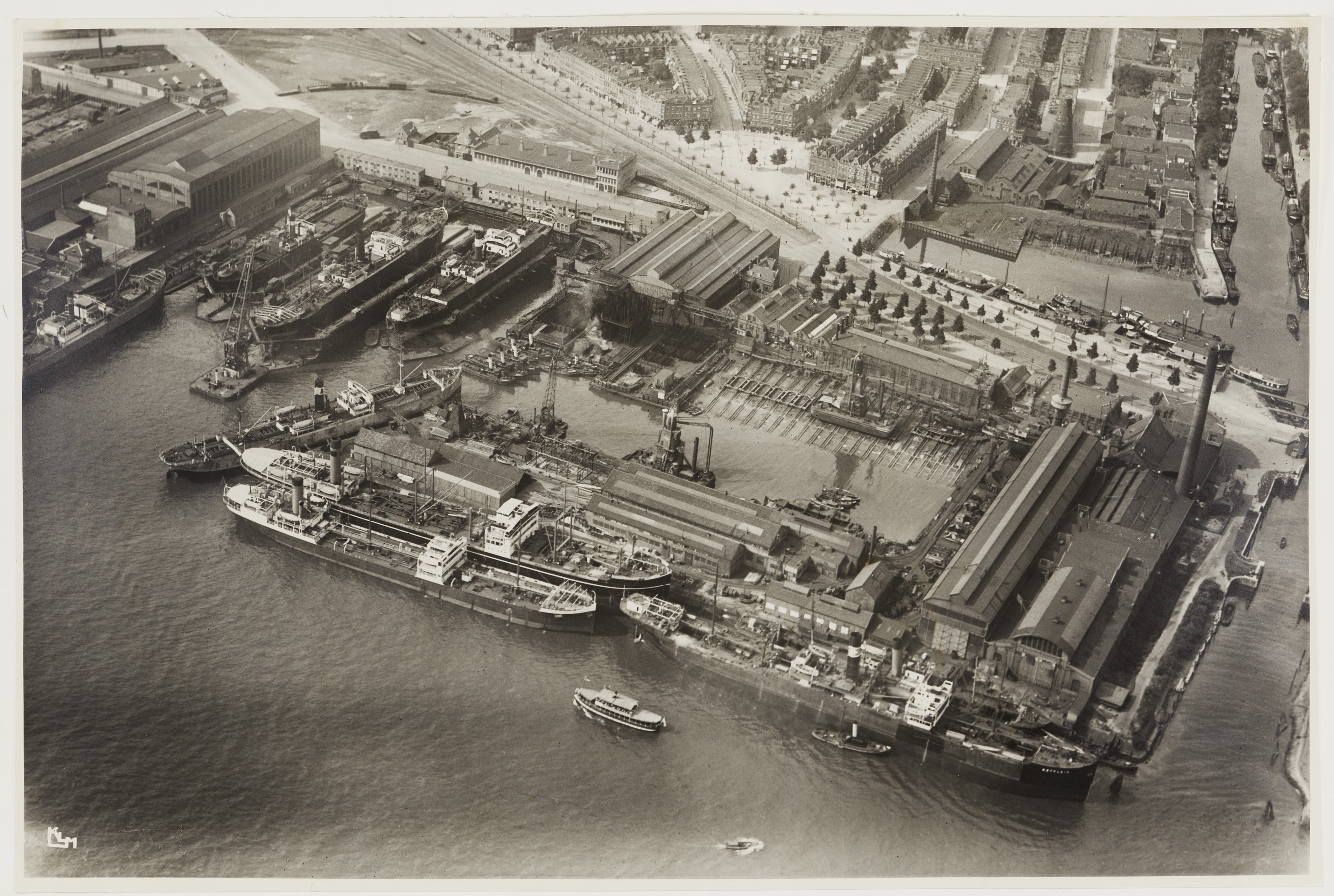
At Delfshaven, 1926

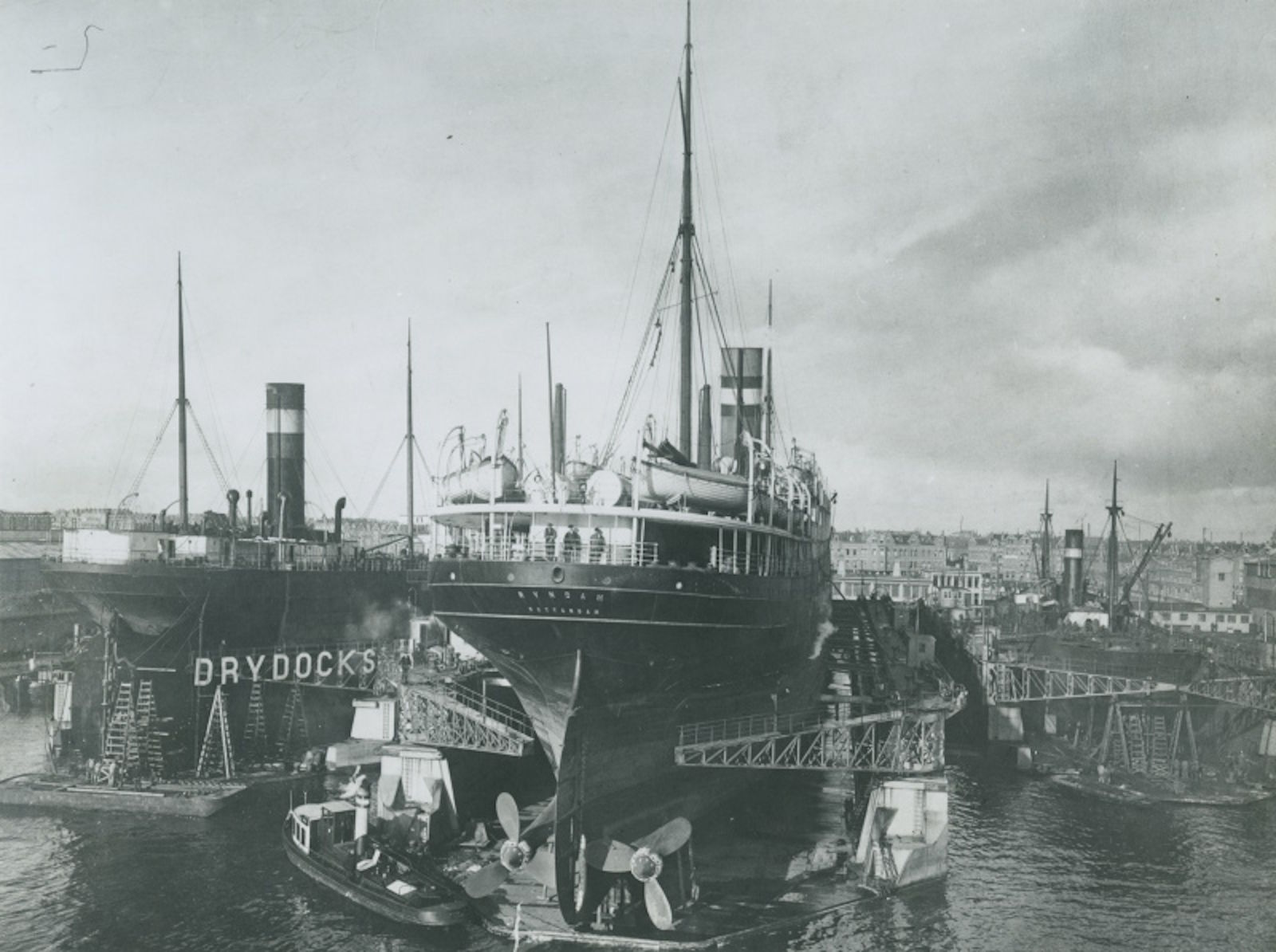
With the 170.9 m by 19.0 m S.S. Ryndam sticking out

In the evening of 9 September 1915, Wilhelminadok was moored between the two drydocks that Wilton's Dok- en Werf Maatschappij already had. It would stay in this location at the Westkousdijk in Delfshaven till March 1935.

On Monday 20 September 1915, Wilton's took Wilhelmina Drydock into use. At about 9:30 AM, it lifted SS Insulinde of the Rotterdam Lloyd. Insulinde was 9,615 GRT and weighed 10–11,000t. The operation was finished at about 2 AM. Only two of the main pumps could be used, because a big transformer and some heavy cables were still missing. On 23 September, the Oostdijk was next.

In the morning of 15 November, just after the steamship Stockholm (ex-Potsdam) had been towed in, Wilhelminadok sank. One guessed that this happened because it had been lowered too deep. Not much remained visible from the shore. The left side sank about a foot lower than the other. Workers had cut the connection bridge to better divided pressures. Only two days later, at 8 PM in the evenining of 17 November, the drydock was afloat again.

During World War I, the Port of Rotterdam was very quiet. In 1915, Wilton's revenue from repairs diminished 13%, even while many Dutch ships had to repair damage from mines and torpedoes. One such repair job was that of SS Eemdijk. She had hit a mine on 7 April 1916 and was provissionally repaired in Southampton. In early June, she was lifted by Wilhelminadok. Repairing her would take 3–4 weeks.

In 1929, Wilton's Dok- en Werf Maatschappij merged with shipyard Fijenoord to form Wilton-Fijenoord. The new company planned to concentrate all activities on a new location in Schiedam.

=== In Schiedam; Dok 3 ===
On 5 March 1935 Wilhelminadok was pulled from its location in Delfshaven to Schiedam. As the two smaller drydocks had been moved earlier, this concentrated formerly Wilton's repair activities there.

While the newspapers referred to Wilhelminadok, it also got the more functional name Dok 3 or Dock 3.

=== Return to Delfshaven and back again ===
By 1961, Wilton-Fijenoord had big plans in Schiedam. To make room, these entailed moving Dok 3 back to Delfshaven. In December 1962, Wilhelminadok was actually moved back to Delfshaven. The move was part of a bigger plan to update the repair yard on the Westkousdijk. Dok 3 would not stay on the Westkousdijk for long. In May 1969, it became known that the location would be closed. By January 1971, Dok 3 was back in Schiedam.

== Service in Poland as Aldok-1 ==
=== Cenal Shipyard ===
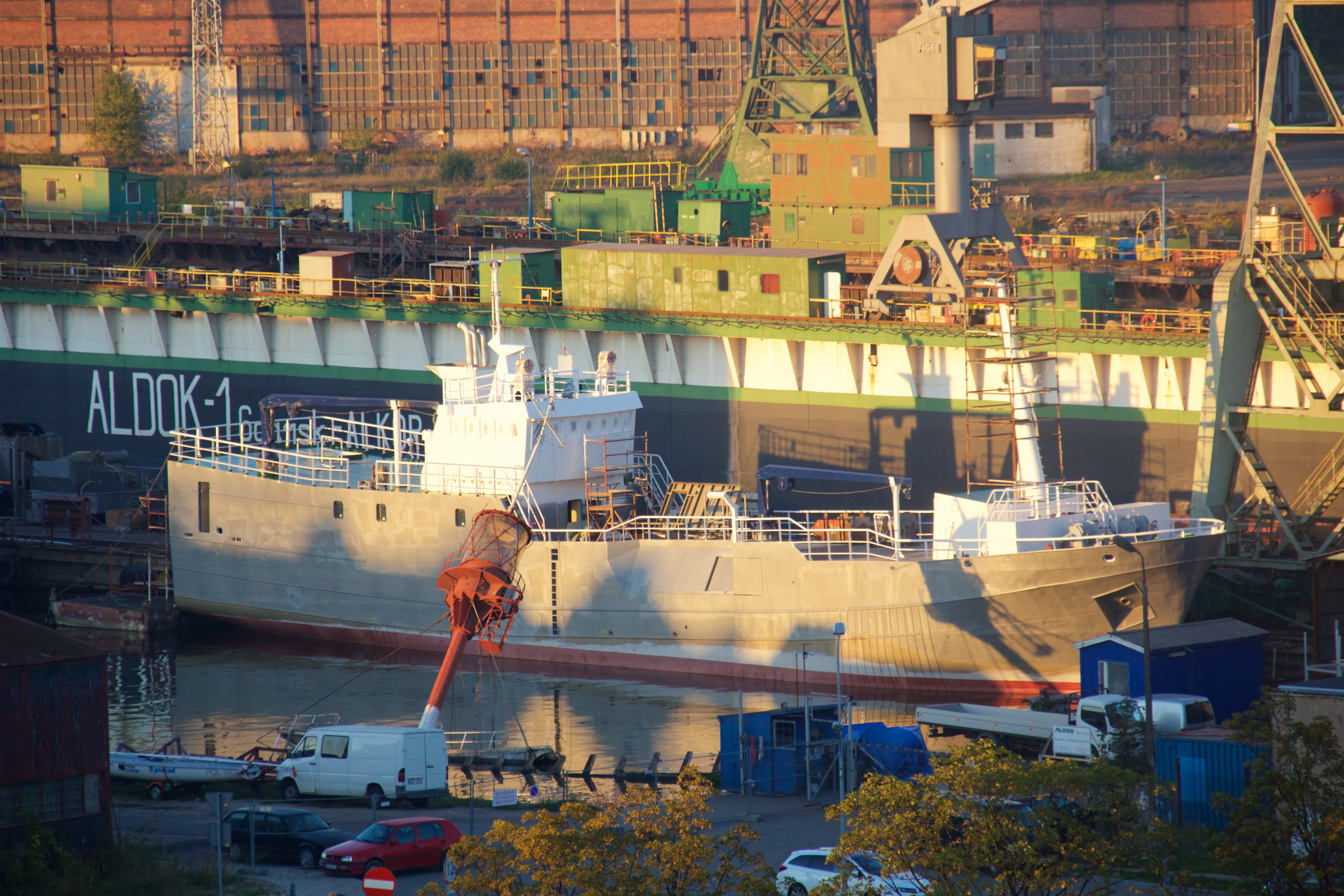
Aldok-1 in 2015

Stocznia Cenal (Cenal Shipyard) in Gdańsk was established in 1996 on the grounds of the old Danziger Werft, which had become Stocznia Gdańska after World War II. Centromor S.A. was the main shareholder. Alkor Co. Ltd. owned 40%.

In 1998, Alkor Co. acquired Wilhelmina Drydock. It was then towed from Rotterdam to Gdańsk via the Kiel Canal. As Aldok-1, Alkor rented the dock out to Stocznia Cenal. In 1999, Aldok-1 lifted its first ship in Gdańsk, the Royal Clipper (ex-Gwarek). By early 2001, Stocznia Cenal was bankrupt.

=== Alkor / Safe ===
Stocznia Alkor (Alkor Shipyard), took over the management of Aldok-1 at some time. In 2015, Safe Co. Ltd. became the sole owner of Stocznia Alkor.

Stocznia Alkor used Aldok-1 in many extensions of ships. The extension of trawler Huginn VE 55, was caught on video. At some time, the shipyard was renamed to Safe Shipyard. This shipyard was founded in 1995 and also went into shipbuilding. In 2020 MS Slettenberg was built on shore. She was then shoved onto a pontoon which brought her to Aldok-1. Slettenberg was then shoved onto the drydock, which lowered it into the sea, effectively launching the vessel. The procedure is comparable to how the purpose-built Cartagena Iron Drydock worked. Many more fishing vessels followed, e.g. Meløyfjord in 2020.

In 2021, Safe merged Alkor into its own company. By late 2025, Safe Shipyard focused on repairs. In November 2025, Aldok-1 lifted the coastal trading vessel Isartal.
