= Wilton's Dok- en Werf Maatschappij =

Dutch shipyard

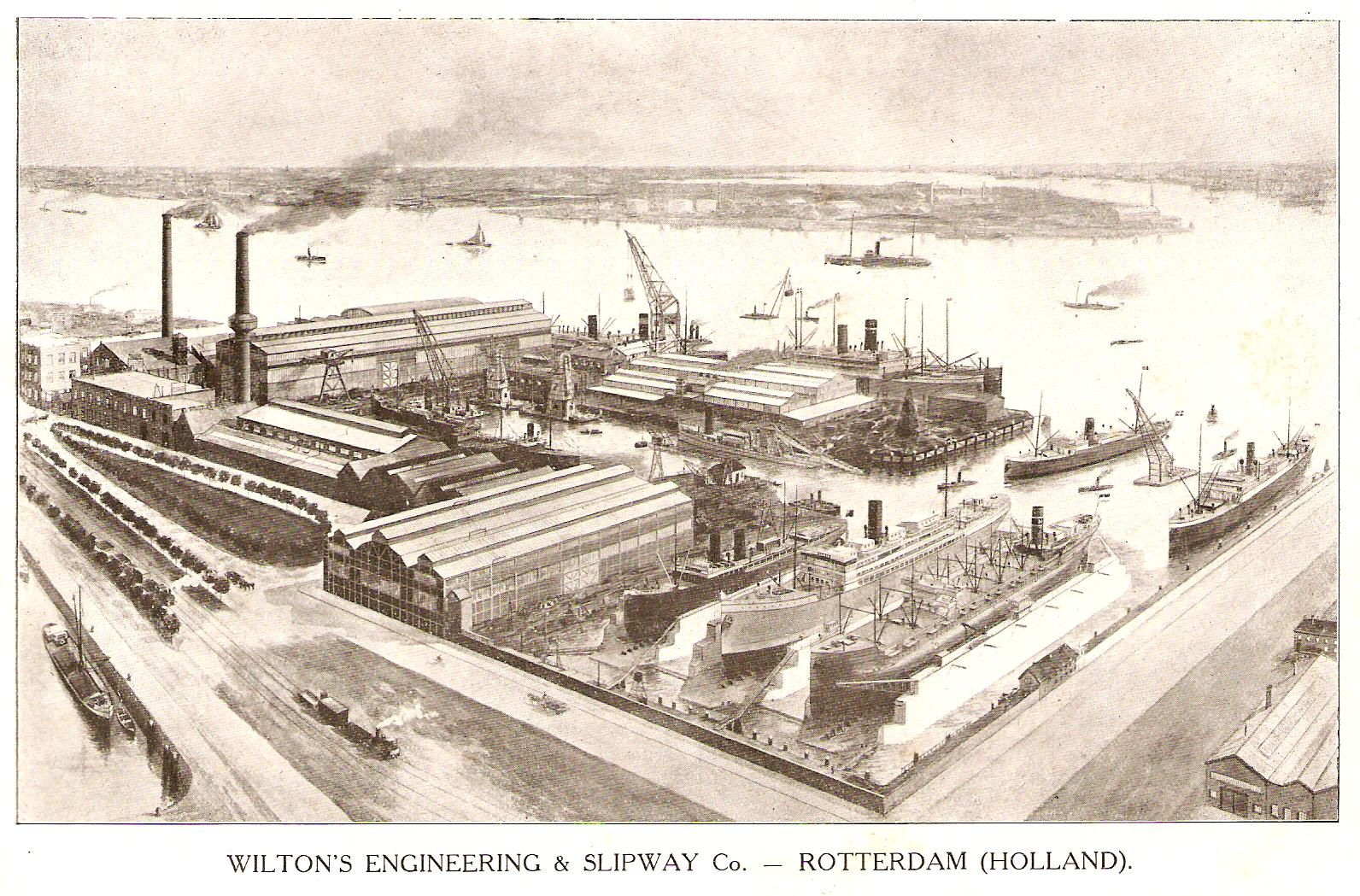
- Wilton's shipyard on the Westkousdijk in Delfshaven
- Industry: Steam engines, Shipbuilding
- Founded: 7 January 1854; 172 years ago in Rotterdam
- Founder: Bartel Wilton
- Fate: Merged with Fijenoord Shipyard
- Successor: Wilton-Fijenoord
- Headquarters: Rotterdam, Netherlands
- Products: Ships, Tugboats, Ship repair

Wilton's Dok- en Werf Maatschappij was a Dutch shipbuilding company active as an independent company from 1854 till 1929. At first it was simply known as 'Wilton'. In 1921 the final Dutch name became: 'Wilton's Dok- en Werf Maatschappij NV', the equivalent of 'Wilton Engineering and Slipway Company'. Wilton started as a traditional smithy and expanded in machinery. It specialized in ship repairs, but also became a shipyard. At first only for fresh water ships. In spite of multiple name changes the company was commonly referred to as 'Wilton'. In 1929 a merger with Fijenoord led to a new company known as Wilton-Fijenoord.

== Founded as a smithy in Rotterdam center ==
Bartel Wilton Sr. (1828-1898) had left Rotterdam to work on a shipyard in London. While there, his old father was living in humble circumstances near the country house of the merchant and regent Abram van Rijckevorsel (1790-1864). Van Rijckevorsel and his friend the shipping magnate Willem Ruys (1837-1901) got an idea to help the old Wilton, who could no longer support himself. They gave Bartel Wilton a loan, so he would return to Rotterdam, and could take over a stove smithy to support himself and his father.

On 7 January 1854 Bartel Wilton started his business as a house and stove smith at the south side of the Baan in Rotterdam. Bartel had seen modern capitalism in London. He visited ships to get smithy work, and invested the profits in new staff and equipment. After his marriage his wife took care of finance and payments. In 1856 Bartel advertised his abilities in electrogalvanization, especially for ship parts. In 1865 Wilton's smithy started to use to steam power. Wilton's smithy was especially successful in boiler repair. In 1875 the company had 35 employees and hired J. Rijsdijk as administrator.

When the company had grown to a few hundred employees, the smithy on the Baan nr 156 continued to exist. In 1893 Wilton got permission to expand it to the plots Lerengang 12 and 13. In 1894 another permit to expand it was requested to the city council.

== On the Westzeedijk (1876-1904) ==
In 1876 Wilton got a thirty year lease on a piece of land behind the parade ground of the militia on the Westzeedijk. It measured 70 by 110 meter, was located on the Meuse, and is now clearly a part of Rotterdam. At the time the factory was often referred to as lying at 'Schoonderloo', a small village just east of Delfshaven. At the Land registration the terrain at the Westzeedijk was known as Delfshaven sectie B No 4507. All in all a recipe for stating that the factory at the Westzeedijk was in Schoonderloo, or even Delfshaven, while it is now in Rotterdam. In this area a small harbor was constructed with a slipway parallel to the waterfront. This slipway made it possible to pull shipsvessels out of the water for repair. Soon the center of gravity of the company shifted to the Westzeedijk.

=== Starts to build engines ===
Wilton was one of several companies that started to construct steam engines and boilers in the 1870s: On 16 September 1876 shipyard van der Kuijl in Slikkerveer launched the iron screw tugboat Hendrika Wilhelmina for A. Bos in Alblasserdam. The machines were to be made by Wilton. On 20 December 1877 the shipyard Wed. C. Boele en Zonen launched the screw tugboat Vooruitgang for Johan van der Graaf at Kralingen, the machine was made by Wilton. On 26 January 1878 M. van der Kuyl in Slikkerveer laid down an iron passenger screw steam boat for Wijnands & Co in Groningen. Wilton would build the machines. The Burgemeester van Uithuizen was launched on 24 May 1878. Van der Kuyl then immediately laid down the Volharding 7 for the Leidsche Stoombootmaatschappij Volharding, also with machines by Wilton. On 9 May 1881 shipyard Gebroeders Pot in Bolnes laid down an Icebreaker with machinery and boilers by Wilton. In 1893 Wilton got orders for a 180 hp engine for the William Egan & Co III built by M. van der Kuil in Slikkerveer. It would also built the machinery for the following William Egan & Co's that would number up to 18. In 1895 Wilton built the 250 ihp machines for the Betsy, the first Dutch steam trawler. In 1896 a Wilton company built the engine and boilers for the fishing sloop Koningin Wilhelmina.

=== Becomes a shipyard ===
On 18 July 1882 Wilton launched its first ship. Cf below for more ships built by Wilton. In 1893 the terrain next to the slipway was heightened by 25,000 cubic meters of soil dug out for the harbor of Katendrecht.

=== Bartel Wilton Jr. joins the company ===
On 24 September 1889 Bartel Wilton and Bartel Wilton Jr. (1863-1938, also known as 'Bart') came to an agreement for joint ownership of and authority over the company. This did not pertain to acts like lending money or offering security. For these Bartel Sr. remained the only authority.

== On the Westkousdijk (1900) ==
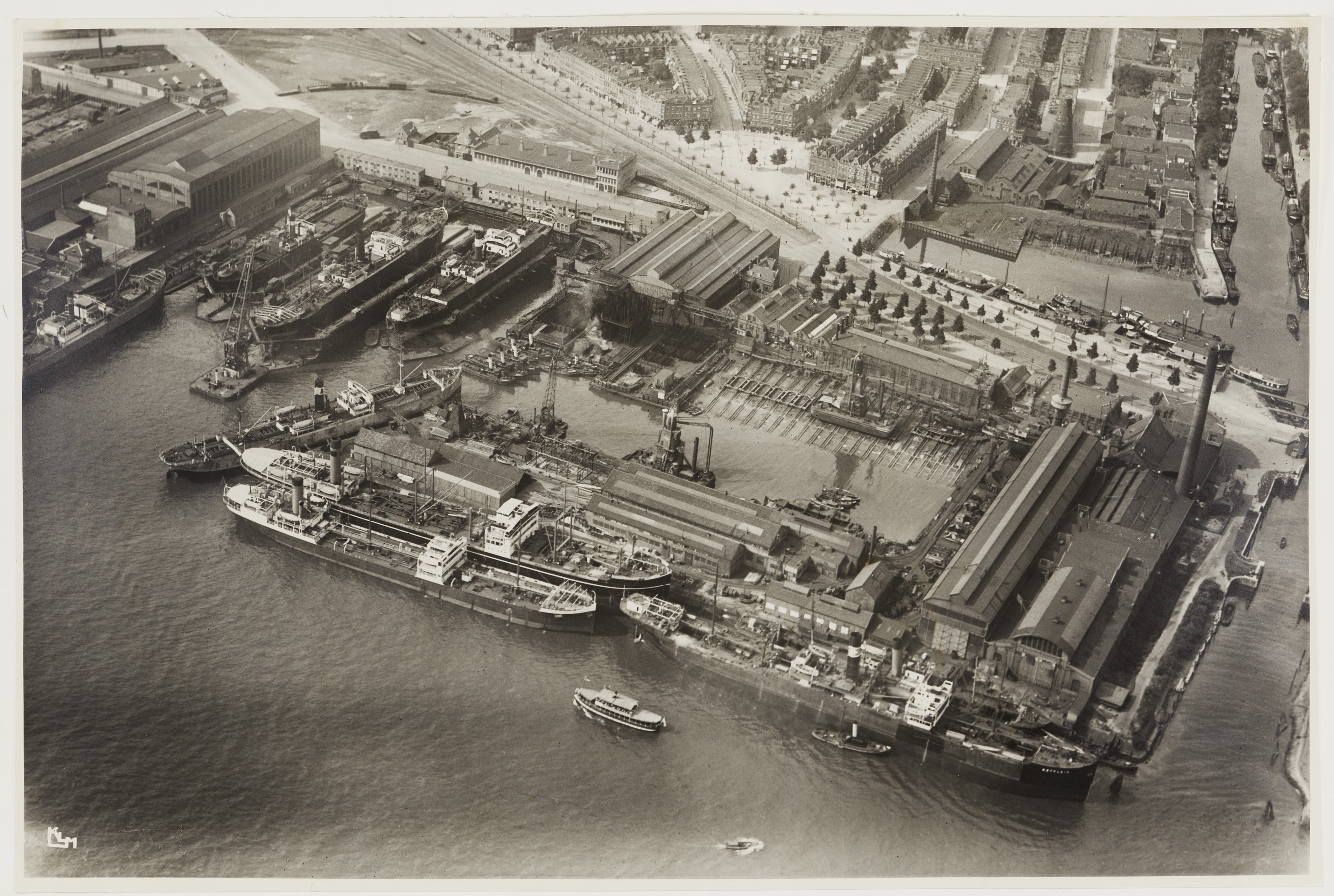
Delfshaven shipyard, 1926

In the 1890s it became clear that Wilton's lease on the terrain at the Westzeedijk would not be continued by the city council. The terrain would be used to expand the city and to dig out the Parkhaven. Therefore Wilton had acquired a new terrain near Delfshaven in 1894. This terrain was the Ruigeplaat, a shoal in front of Delshaven, that had been dug through to directly connect Delfshaven to the Meuse again. The company acquired the Ruigeplaat for 375,000 guilders. On the western part of this shoal a new plot for the company was made. It got the address Westkousdijk.

=== Public company Machinefabriek voorheen onder de firma B. Wilton ===
The move to Delfshaven would be combined with bigger plans. On 14 February 1895 the private company was transformed into a limited company with a capital of 300,000 guilders. Bartel Sr. got 296 shares and Bartel Jr. just three. For these they brought in their ownership of the company. Henry Wilton just one share, that he paid in cash. The new company got the name: 'Machinefabriek voorheen onder de firma B. Wilton'. The statute of a limited company helped to keep profits in the company and to raise capital. On March 4, 1895, the sons Bart and John Henry Wilton took over their father's part in the business. Bart was a businessman, and John Henry a technician who had been trained as a shipbuilder in Delft. Bartel Jr. opted for an expansion strategy to profit from the huge growth of the Rotterdam port following the completion of the Nieuwe Waterweg and the economic expansion of Germany. In his vision one should stay ahead of the competition by having the best technical equipment on the most economical place (the Westkousdijk). Bart would prove right in his assessment.

=== Facilities on the Westkousdijk ===
On 3 September 1898, a few weeks before he died, the Bartel Wilton Sr. laid the first stone for a big new factory to build boilers. In 1902 an electrical power plant was built. The new complex also included a machine factory, an iron foundry, and a slipway for sideways launching. This could also be used to pull ships out of the water.. By 1904 the whole company was concentrated in Delfshaven.

The jewel in the crown was a floating dry dock launched in 1907 by Swan Hunter and Wighan Richardson. It had a lift capacity of 7,500 tons, and was 424 feet long. It had three separate independent compartments, that could be uncoupled when the drydock herself had to dock. Its pumps were powered by electricity from shore.

In September 1911 a second floating dock built by Swan Hunter arrived. Measuring 365 by 81 feet, it was somewhat smaller and lifted 4,200 tons.

The effect of the dry docks was huge. The total wages paid by Wilton in 1904 amounted to 594,237 guilders. In 1913 this was 1,819,795 guilders, three times as much in under 10 years. The tonnage of the ships that Wilton repaired showed an even more extreme expansion. On the slipways it grew in proportion to the number of ships serviced. On the drydocks it exploded to more than ten times the amount on the slipway.

Ships repaired by Wilton 1907-1913
	Drydock(s)		Slipways	
Year	Ships	R.T.B.	Ships	R.T.B.
1907	55	179,956	95	121,604
1909	198	658,405	99	106,718
1911	313	1,050,716	146	173,630
1913	490	1,644,810	114	144,423

Wilhelmina Drydock also known as Dok 3, was a floating drydock with a lift capacity of 13,000-14,000t. In September 1915 SS Insulinde was the first ship that used the dock.

Wilton quickly grasped that the Internal combustion engine, which led to the Motor ship would become important. In 1911 Wilton came to an agreement with the Nederlandsche Fabriek van Werktuigen en spoorwegmaterieel, later named Werkspoor. It resulted in a license to produce Diesel engines for ships.

=== World War 1 ===
World War 1 started with some good years for Dutch shipping. Wilton also profited from an increased demand for ship repair caused by mines and torpedoes. In January 1916 the company was hit by a measure of the German government. It forbade the export of multiple kinds of iron, annulling existing contracts. New contracts could be made only at much steeper prices.

== In Schiedam (1916) ==
=== Acquisition of grounds in Schiedam ===
During the war the company considered the options for the post war period. The company could make a strategic choice for shipbuilding, advocated by younger brother Ir. Henry Wilton. An alternative strategy was to continue the focus on ship repair. The latter option probably necessitating investments to dock ships of up to 20,000 tons. Bartel Jr opted for the ship repair strategy. It led to the move to Schiedam. The move included an ambition to be able to repair the biggest ocean liners. The latter was supported by the Holland America Line, which foresaw that it would employ very big ships in the near future, and was looking for a docking facility. In 1916 a terrain of 56 ha was bought in Schiedam. In 1917 construction of a harbor on the terrain started, but the company did not move to the new grounds till after the war.

=== Expansion Strategy ===
In 1919 the corporate strategy was further expanded. The idea was to be able repair and construct the biggest ships afloat. The company would build a double fixed drydock for building very big ships, the first of its kind in the Netherlands. Its size would permit the simultaneous construction of two ships of 200 m, or 8 ships of 100m each. If this new method of construction would prove effective another fixed drydock would be built for constructing ships of 300 m. A huge floating drydock of 40,000 tons would complete the picture. For Bartel Jr. the expansion into ship construction went too far, and in 1920 he resigned from his executive position.

=== Facilities in Schiedam ===
The ambition to have a huge floating drydock was realized by buying the floating dock that Blohm + Voss had started to construct for the Austro-Hungarian Navy. It was bought in 1919, but it was July 1920 when it arrived in Schiedam. It was 211.8 m long, 51.2 m wide and 16 m high. During transport one of its 6 parts was carried as cargo. From July till April 1921 Wilton worked on completing this floating drydock, spending another 400,000 guilders. In April 1921 the dock was taken into use when it received the SS Rotterdam (1908) of 36,870t displacement, the biggest Dutch ship. Several government ministers and other dignitaries visited Wilton for the occasion. It was one of the decisive moments in Wilton's history.

The fixed construction drydock was also finished in 1921. Such a construction drydock was a novelty. It was not as deep as a regular fixed drydock, because new ships had a shallower draft. Two advantages for the shipyard originated from constructing on a horizontal surface. It made vertical placement of scantlings etc. much easier, and it led to a significant reduction in the cost of moving men and building materials vertically. A third advantage were the reduced cost of launching a ship. The huge warehouse (Scheepsloods) on the new terrain was made of reinforced concrete. At 165 m by 130 m it was supposed to be the largest of its kind in Europe with regard to total surface as well as surface spanned by its concrete arcs.

=== Becomes Wilton's Dok- en Werf Maatschappij N.V. ===
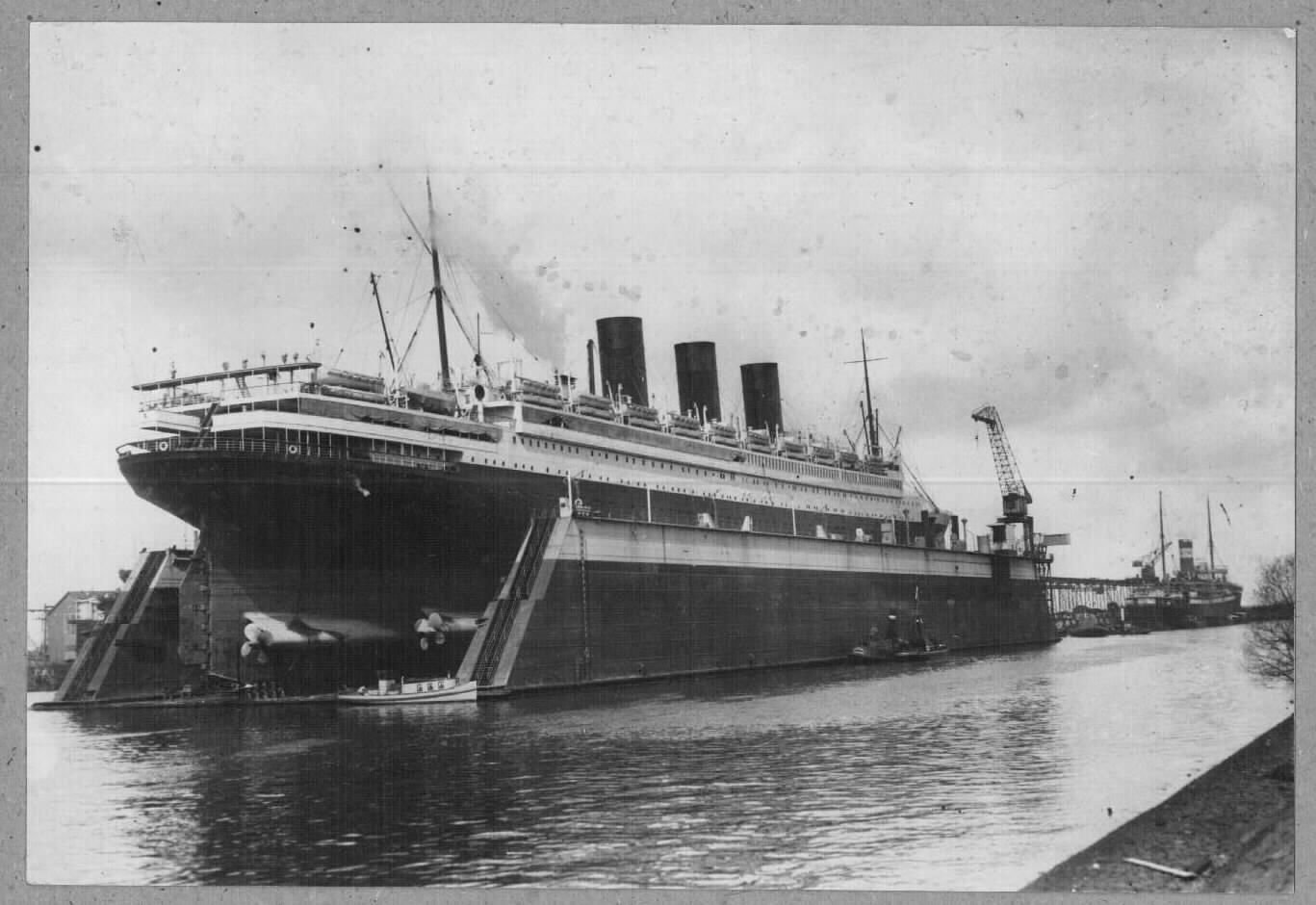
SS Paris in the 46,000 tons dock at Schiedam in 1926

In 1921 there was also a financial reorganization. A new public company called Wilton's Dok- en Werf Maatschappij N.V. was founded. It acquired all shares of Wilton's Machinefabriek en Scheepswerf, and in turn emitted shares for 25,000,000 guilders. The HAL got involved in the company by converting a loan into shares.

The 1918-1929 period was in general profitable for the company, except for a small downturn in 1921 and 1922. From 1920-1928 the number ships in the drydocks grew from 331 to 486 while the tonnage grew from 1,346,896 to 2,506,609 R.T.B. The board of the company had the ambition to bring the ship and engine construction activities of the company to the same height as that of the ship repair activities, but this was not so simple. In ship repair the excellent location, facilities, reputation and skill of her employees put the company ahead of foreign competition and led to good margins. In ship construction the competition was much fiercer.

In October 1925 a newspaper wrote that in a practical sense the yard at Schiedam was not yet in use, and called it a monument for the foolish investments by war profiteers. Indeed in 1924 Wilton had received a first significant order from the navy department for HNLMS Soemba, and in 1925 four ships had been laid down for the KPM, but this was way below the capacity of the location. In 1926 the 233 m long SS Paris of 34,570t docked at Schiedam. In 1927 another big ocean liner arrived in Schiedam. It was the SS Statendam (1898) of 28,291 brt. She had been ordered by the HAL at Harland and Wolff in 1919. In 1922 construction had been stopped, and the uncompleted hull had been launched in 1924. The HAL then decided to have her finished in Schiedam, where she arrived in 1927.

== Merger with Fijenoord ==
The act of finishing the Statendam kind of completed the transformation of the company, that began to look very much like her competitor Fijenoord. Nevertheless, Wilton still had an advantage in ship repair, and Fijenoord was still ahead in ship construction, especially for the navy. The idea for a merger to combine these strengths started as far back as 1927. In 1929 talks led to an agreement for a financial merger between the companies. Shares in Wilton and shares in Fijenoord were exchanged for shares in a new united company: Dok- en Werf-Maatschappij Wilton-Fijenoord. The ratio between worth of Wilton and Fijenoord was 15.5 : 3. It was a clear indication of how Wilton had outgrown the old Fijenoord.

== Daughter company Rotterdamsche Sleepdienst ==
The Blauwe Ster (Blue Star) line was a shipping line and tug service between Rotterdam and Amsterdam. In April 1875 it employed the ship Marie of skipper J.H. van Vliet. By 1876 it had 8 kraakschepen, with two more under construction. By 1879 there seems to have been a daily service between the cities. In March 1884 the Blauwe Ster had 6 tugboats and 18 'kraakschepen' that could also serve as lighters. One of the lighters was called Helena. In early January 1887 the tugboat Paul broke through the ice blocking the inland waterways Amstel, Hollandse IJssel from Rotterdam to Amsterdam. The Henri followed with six lighters. The tugboats Jacob and IJsploeg of the Blauwe Ster also participated in keeping the waterways open. They all used a removable bow to break the ice. It was a bit unclear how the line would redeem the cost of such operations. In February 1891 the line waited till a group of companies came up with enough money to pay for her ice-breaking services. In May 1893 the Blauwe Ster decided to end her activities.

In March 1894 the public company Rotterdamsche Sleepdienst (Rotterdam Tug services) was founded. The founders were Bartel Wilton Sr, his sons Bartel Wilton jr and John Henry Wilton, and Wilton Engineering and Slipway Company, known as 'Firma B. Wilton' at the time. The family members each deposited 1,000 guilders for one share. The company took 42 shares, and paid for them by bringing in six tugboats; the Paul, Henry, Hugo, Max, James III and Willem.

== Ships built ==
Ships built by Wilton
Ship	Type	Launched	Length	Beam	Draught	Power	Notes
Jacob	Screw Tugboat	18 July 1882				80 ihp	First ship built by Wilton. It was built for the tug service of the Blauwe Ster between Amsterdam and Rotterdam.
Bartel	Screw Tugboat	(LD July 1882) 26 April 1883.				100 ihp	Built for the tug service of the Blauwe Ster between Amsterdam and Rotterdam.
Fiat Voluntas I	Screw Tugboat	1884	29.38	5.55	2.00	330 ihp	Delivered in October 1884.
Stad Arnhem	Screw Tugboat	14 March 1885					Built for the Geldersche Stoomsleepbootmaatschappij.
Union	Screw Tugboat	(LD March 1885) 24 June 1885					Sister of Fiat Voluntas built for J. Visscher from Schiedam
Unknown	Screw Tugboat	Laid down March 1885					Sister of Fiat Voluntas built for P.W. Hulsman from Rotterdam
Unknown	Screw Tugboat	7 November 1885					Built for the harbor of Bologna.
Ideal	Screw Tugboat	22 September 1886					Built for Stenz & Brückwilder in Mainz.
Flore	Screw Tugboat	August 1887					Built for Jules Driane & Co from Maaseik.
Victoria	Screw Tugboat	10 March 1888					Built for Otterbeck, Becker and Kiefer in Duisburg.
Indusrtrie XXIV	Screw river cargo ship	10 March 1888				380 ihp	Built for Oberrheinsiche Schiffahrt-Gesellschaft te Keulen
Fiat Voluntas II	Screw Tugboat	25 August 1888				100 ihp	Built for W. van Driel in Opijnen.
Eugénie	Screw Tugboat	4 June 1891				300 ihp	Built for H. Braakman & Company from Rotterdam for cargo transport from Rotterdam to Antwerpen.
Admiraal Nelson	Screw Tugboat	19 September 1891					Built for H. Hasselo from Dordrecht.
Anna	Screw ship	(LD 9 Feb 1892) 30 July 1892				550 ihp triple compound	Built for Jos de Poorter and his iron ore transport on the Rhine.
Unknown	Screw Tugboat	1893				300 ihp	Built for tugging on the Rhine
Unknown	Screw Tugboat	1893				300 ihp	Built for tugging on the Rhine
Unknown	Screw Tugboat	1893				150 ihp	Built for tugging on the Rhine
Unknown	Screw cargo ship	1893				500 ihp	Ship with 2 screws
Unknown	Screw cargo ship	1893				500 ihp	Ship with 2 screws
Keuchenius	Screw Tugboat	Laid down 22 February 1896				125 ihp	Built for J.L. van der Boom from Rotterdam.
Rupel	Screw Tugboat	1898				120 ihp	Built for Th. van Houteghem from Rupelmonde
Maria Philomena	Screw Tugboat	1898				600 ihp	Built for F. Giessen from Rotterdam
Swift	Screw Tugboat	1898				150 ihp	Built for Ch. Gillard from Liège
Fram	Screw Tugboat	1898	21 m	5 m		165 ihp	Built for L.G. Vuijk from Rotterdam
Fred Gosselberg van Baden	Passenger boat	1898				120 ihp	Built for Carl Annheiters Erben from Ludwigshafen
Sneek III	Cargo boat	1898				60 ihp	Built for Firma E.S. & C. Sint Martin from Rotterdam
Louisa	Cargo boat	1898				90 ihp	Built for Bank & Handelsvereninging voorheen P.J. Bergen from Venlo Capacity 80 last.
Herman Unger II	Screw Tugboat	LD 1898				750 ihp	Built for Herman Unger Ruhrort.
Unknown	Screw Tugboat	LD 1898				150 ihp	Built for De la Ruye Tiellin from Gent
Unknown	Screw Tugboat	LD 1898				140 ihp	Built for M.J. Reynvaan from Utrecht
Swift II	Screw Tugboat	LD 1898				200 ihp	Built for Ch. Gillard from Liège
2 unknown	Screw Tugboat	LD 1898				90 ihp	Built for G. de Rycker from Brugge
unknown	Screw Tugboat	LD 1898				360 ihp	Built for Kleijmans en Hoogerwerff from Rotterdam
unknown	Screw Tugboat	LD 1898				50 ihp	Built for Noord-Afrikaanse Handels Vennootschap from Rotterdam
unknown	Screw ship	LD 1898				400 ihp	Built for J.H. Koenigsfeld from Rotterdam
Unknown	Screw ship	LD 1899					Built for E.S. & C. Sint Martin from Rotterdam.
Unknown	Screw ship	LD 1899					Built for De la Ruye from Merelbeke.
Unknown	Screw ship	LD 1899					Built for Rijkswaterstaat.
Unknown	Screw tugboat	LD 1899					Built for W. van Driel from Rotterdam.
2 Unknown	Screw tugboat	LD 1899					Built for Johan Otten & Zoon from Rotterdam.
Cosmopoliet	Hopper	LD 1903					
Vlaanderen	'Bakkenzuiger'	LD 1903					
2 unknown	Steam Trawlers	LD 1903					
HNLMS Soemba (1925)	Flores-class gunboat	24 August 1925	75.6 m	11.5 m	3.6 m	2,000 shp	First significant order for the Dutch navy
Van Goens	Passenger-freight	19 December 1925	230 feet	38 feet	12' 6"	775 ihp	Built for the Koninklijke Paketvaart-Maatschappij, machines by Stork, first of 4 identical ships
Van Diemen	Passenger-freight	19 December 1925	230 feet	38 feet	12' 6"	775 ihp	Built for the Koninklijke Paketvaart-Maatschappij, machines by Stork
Speelman	Passenger-freight	20 March 1926	230 feet	38 feet	12' 6"	775 ihp	Built for the Koninklijke Paketvaart-Maatschappij, machines by Stork
Duymaer van Twist	Passenger-freight	20 March 1926	230 feet	38 feet	12' 6"	775 ihp	Built for the Koninklijke Paketvaart-Maatschappij, machines by Stork. Last of four.
