= Keel block =

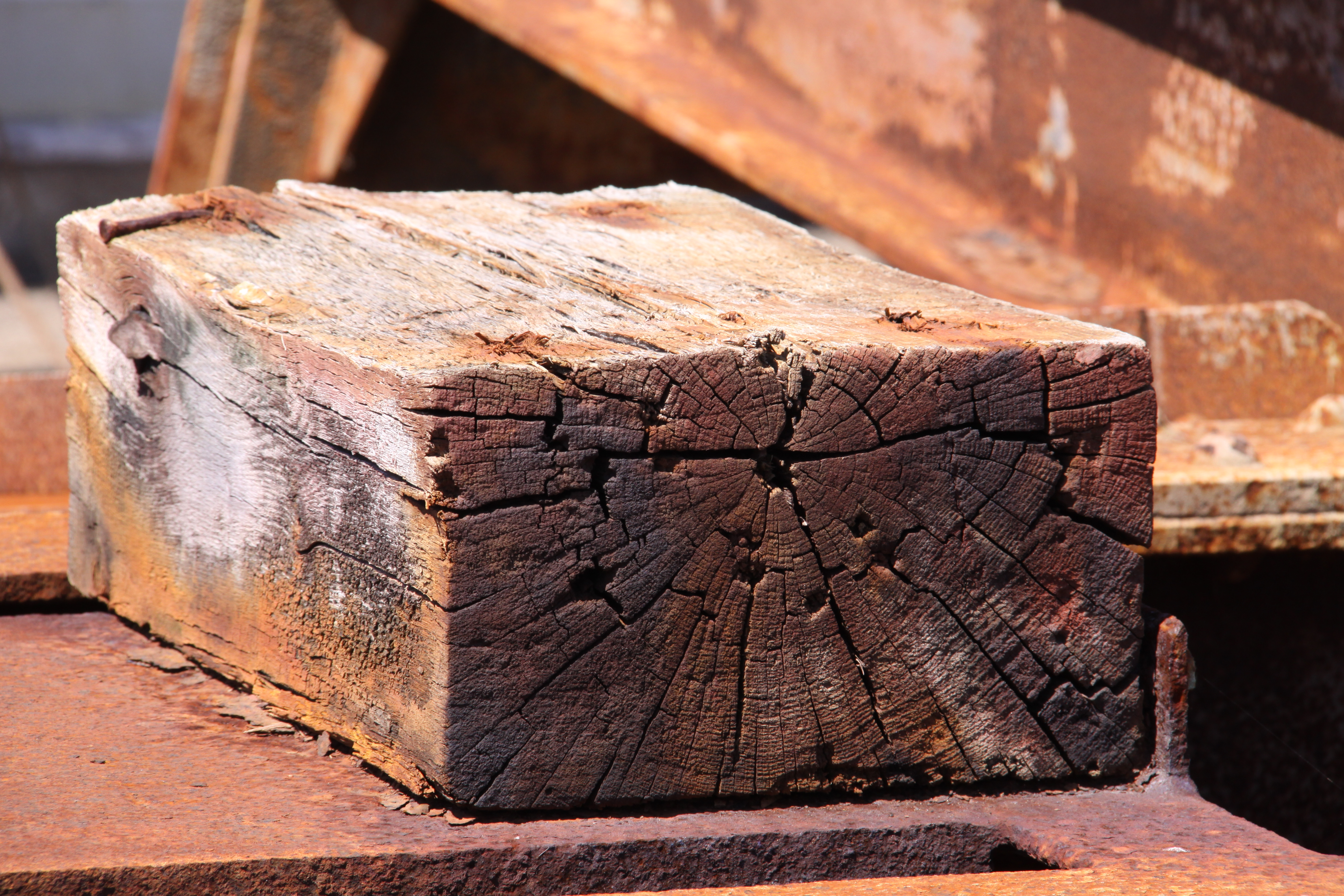
A keel block

In marine terms, a keel block, is a concrete or dense wood cuboid that rests under a ship during a time of repair, construction, or in the event of a dock being drained. The block rests under the keel of a ship.

== Purpose ==
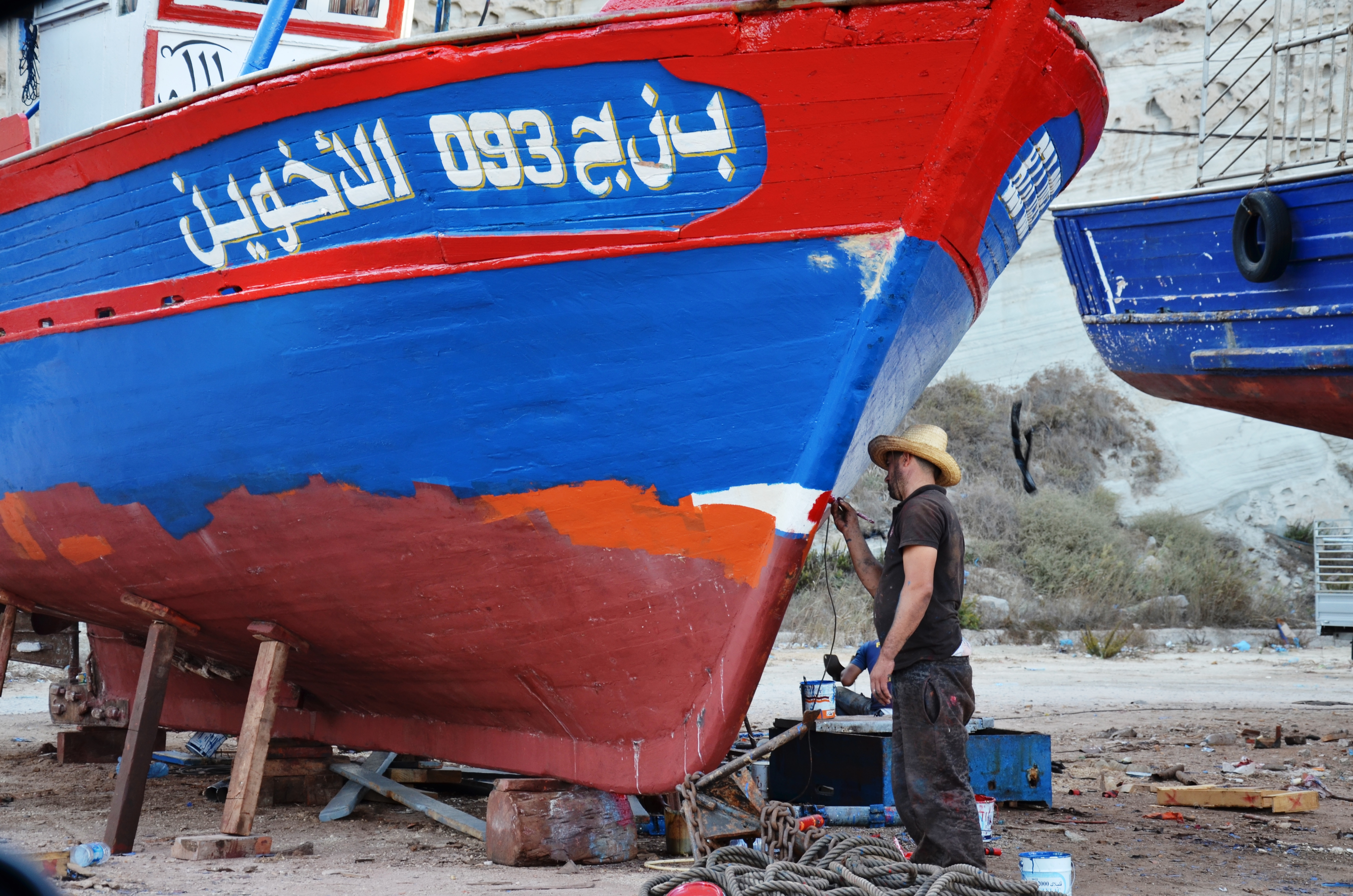
Ship on keel blocks during renovation

In general, the purpose of a keel block is to prevent a ship's keel from sitting directly on the ground. The preferable height of a keel above the floor is influenced by how conveniently workers can access the underside of the hull. During construction, 4 ft (1.2 m) was set as a minimum for ordinary working.

The other main reason that a keel should not sit on the floor of a dock is that this would crush any protruding parts. If the keel is not completely straight, all pressure would be on the part with the highest draft, while other parts would not be supported. With some difficulty, this can be solved by using higher blocks near the extremities of the vessel.

Therefore, all ships have a docking plan. This contains information like: The length and shape of the keel; peculiarities of stern post and rudder; information for height and angle of possible bilge blocks; shape and location of other keels, docking keels, struts, propellers, underwater fittings, projections and openings; location of boilers, engines and other unusual weights.
