= Second Happy Time =

Period of German sinking of merchant ships off the East Coast during the Second World War

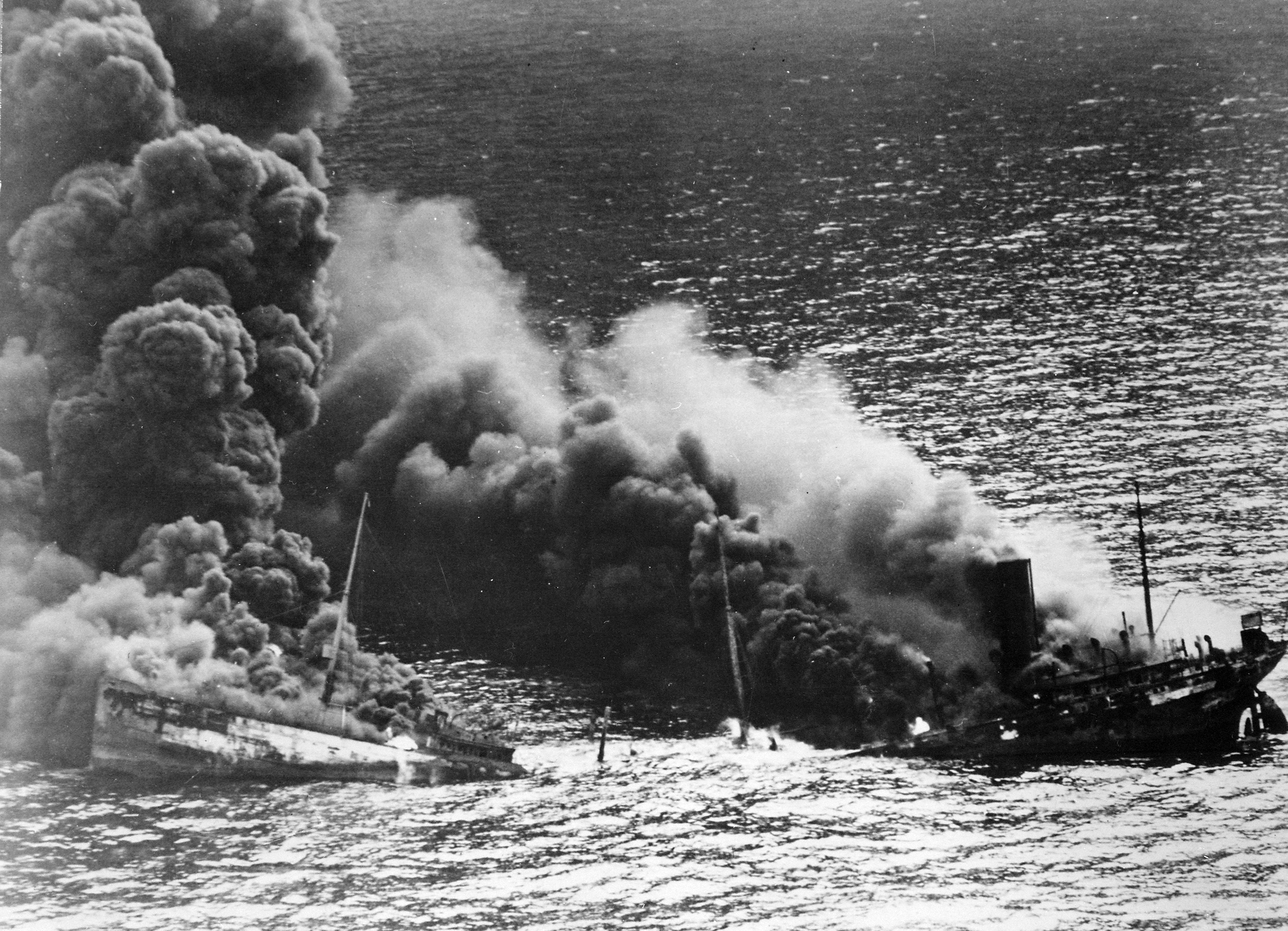
SS Dixie Arrow torpedoed off Cape Hatteras by U-71, 26 March 1942

The Second Happy Time (German: Zweite glückliche Zeit; officially Unternehmen Paukenschlag (transl. Operation Drumbeat), and also known among German submarine commanders as the "American Shooting Season") was a phase in the Battle of the Atlantic during which Axis submarines attacked merchant shipping and Allied naval vessels along the east coast of North America. The First Happy Time was in 1940–41 in the North Atlantic and North Sea. Adolf Hitler and Benito Mussolini declared war on the United States on 11 December 1941, and as a result their navies could begin the Second Happy Time.

The Second Happy Time lasted from January 1942 to about August of that year and involved several German naval operations, including Operation Neuland. German submariners named it the "Happy Time" or the "Golden Time", as defense measures were weak and disorganized, and the U-boats were able to inflict massive damage with little risk. During this period, Axis submarines sank 609 ships totaling 3.1 million tons, against a loss of only 22 U-boats. This led to the loss of thousands of lives, mainly those of merchant mariners. Although fewer than the losses during the 1917 campaign of the First World War, those of this period equaled roughly one quarter of all ships sunk by U-boats during the entire Second World War.

Historian Michael Gannon called it "America's Second Pearl Harbor" and placed the blame for the nation's failure to respond quickly to the attacks on the inaction of Admiral Ernest J. King, commander-in-chief of the United States Navy (USN). As King also refused British offers to provide the US navy with their own ships, the belated institution of a convoy system was in large part due to a severe shortage of suitable escort vessels, without which convoys were seen as actually more vulnerable than lone ships.

== Background ==
=== German intentions ===
Upon Germany's declaration of war on the United States on 11 December 1941 just after the attack on Pearl Harbor, the US was, on paper at least, in a fortunate position. Where the other combatants on the Allied side had already lost thousands of trained sailors and airmen, and were experiencing shortages of ships and aircraft, the US was at full strength (save for its recent losses at Pearl Harbor). The US had the opportunity to learn about modern naval warfare by observing the conflicts in the North Sea and the Mediterranean, and through a close relationship with the United Kingdom. The USN had already gained significant experience in countering U-boats in the Atlantic, particularly from April 1941 when President Franklin D. Roosevelt extended the "Pan-American Security Zone" east almost as far as Iceland. The United States had massive manufacturing capacity and a favorable geographical position from a defensive point of view: the port of New York, for example, was 4,800 kilometres (3,000 mi) to the west of the U-boat bases in Brittany.

U-boat commander Vizeadmiral Karl Dönitz saw the entry of the US into the war as a golden opportunity to strike heavy blows in the tonnage war and Hitler ordered an assault on America on 12 December 1941. The standard Type VII submarine had insufficient range to patrol off the coast of North America (although, in due time, Type VII submarines were successfully able to patrol off the eastern seaboard of North America, due to refueling, rearming, and resupply logistical support by Type XIV submarine tender); the only suitable weapons he had on hand were the larger Type IX. These were less maneuverable and slower to submerge, making them much more vulnerable than the Type VIIs. They were also fewer in number.

=== American deficiencies ===
Animation simulating a tanker silhouetted against lights of a city. When partial blackouts were introduced towards the middle of 1942, skyglow continued to be a problem in coastal cities.

The American response in early 1942 was hampered by poor organization and doctrine, and a lack of anti-submarine warfare (ASW) aircraft, ships, and personnel.

The USN entered the war without the equivalent of the British Black Swan-class sloop or the River-class frigate despite previous involvement in the Atlantic (see USS Reuben James.) The massive new naval construction program prioritized other types of ships. Fleet destroyers did not have the qualities for ASW; the ideal ASW escort had relatively low speed; carried a large number of depth charges; was highly maneuverable; and had long endurance. The 50 World War I-era destroyers transferred to Britain in the 1941 Destroyers for Bases Agreement would have been poor ASW escorts, even had they been retained, due to poor maneuverability.

The USN had some destroyers available on the east coast at the time of the first attacks. It had previously recalled at least 25 Atlantic Convoy Escort Command Destroyers, including seven at anchor in New York Harbor. It initially refused to use them as escorts even as losses mounted. When the first destroyers were finally released, their employment was hampered by poor doctrine. They were assigned to offensive patrols rather than escorting convoys due to public and political pressure. As late as March, USN escort doctrine was aggressive with an emphasis on destroying attackers, rather than stopping losses. The option of pressing small civilian ships into service as rudimentary convoy escorts in early 1942 was not exercised.

Even if escorts had been available, the USN was unprepared to perform "Naval Control of Shipping" (NCS), the control and tracking of shipping (in convoy or sailing independently), although it had already received the reference material from Canada. Without escorts, the US could not take advantage of the existing Allied NCS. For shipping in the western Atlantic north of the equator, NCS was handled by the Royal Canadian Navy (RCN) since the start of the war; the RCN only passed the responsibility to the USN in July 1942.

Operationally, the USN's ASW effort was fragmented. In theory, Admiral King was responsible for coordinating all ASW activities, including the development of doctrine. In practice, King's many other responsibilities prevented him from doing an adequate job. Therefore, the three Atlantic operational commands – the Atlantic Fleet, the Eastern Sea Frontier, and the Gulf Sea Frontier – were left to develop their own ASW tactics individually. The issue was not resolved until May 1943 with the formation of the United States Tenth Fleet.

British experience in the first two years of World War II, which included the massive losses incurred to their shipping during the First Happy Time, confirmed that ships sailing in convoy – with or without escort – were far safer than ships sailing alone. The British recommended that merchant ships should avoid obvious standard routings wherever possible; navigational markers, lighthouses, and other aids to the enemy should be removed, and a strict coastal blackout be enforced. In addition, any available air and sea forces should perform daylight patrols to restrict the U-boats' flexibility. For several months, none of the recommendations were followed. Coastal shipping continued to sail along marked routes and burn normal navigation lights. Boardwalk communities ashore were only requested to turn their illuminations off in the beginning of the war. Some major cities, including New York City, did have some blackout drills early on, but constant 'dimouts' were not ordered until the spring of 1942.

The primary target area was the Eastern Sea Frontier, commanded by Rear-Admiral Adolphus Andrews and covering the area from Maine to North Carolina. Andrews had practically no modern forces to work with: on the water he commanded seven Coast Guard cutters, four converted yachts, three 1919-vintage patrol boats, two gunboats dating back to 1905, and four wooden submarine chasers. About 100 aircraft were available, but these were short-range models only suitable for training. As a consequence of the traditionally antagonistic relationship between the USN and the United States Army Air Forces (USAAF), all larger aircraft remained under USAAF control, and in any case the USAAF was neither trained nor equipped for ASW.

== Campaign ==
=== Opening moves ===
Immediately after war was declared on the United States, Dönitz began to implement Operation Paukenschlag (often translated as "drumbeat" or "drumroll", and literally as "timpani beat"). Only six of the twenty operational Type IX boats were available, and one of those six encountered mechanical trouble. This left just five long-range submarines for the opening moves of the campaign.

Loaded with the maximum possible amounts of fuel, food and ammunition, the first of the five Type IXs left Lorient in France on 18 December 1941, the others following over the next few days. Each carried sealed orders to be opened after passing 20°W, which directed them to different parts of the North American coast. No charts or sailing directions were available: Kapitänleutnant Reinhard Hardegen of U-123, for example, was provided with two tourist guides to New York, one of which contained a fold-out map of the harbor.

Each U-boat made routine signals on exiting the Bay of Biscay, which were picked up by the British Y service and plotted in Rodger Winn's London Submarine Tracking Room, which were then able to follow the progress of the Type IXs across the Atlantic, and cable an early warning to the RCN. Working on the slimmest of evidence, Winn correctly deduced the target area and passed a detailed warning to King, of a "heavy concentration of U-boats off the North American seaboard", including the five boats already on station and further groups that were in transit, 21 U-boats in all. Rear-Admiral Edwin T. Layton of the US Combined Operations and Intelligence Center then informed the responsible area commanders, but little or nothing else was done.

On 12 January 1942, Admiral Andrews was warned that "three or four U-boats" were about to commence operations against coastal shipping (in fact, there were indeed three), but he refused to institute a convoy system on the grounds that this would only provide the U-boats with more targets.

When U-123 sank the 9,500-ton Norwegian tanker Norness within sight of Long Island in the early hours of 14 January, no warships were dispatched to investigate, allowing the U-123 to sink the 6,700-ton British tanker Coimbra off Sandy Hook on the following night before proceeding south towards New Jersey. By this time there were 13 destroyers idle in New York Harbor, yet none were employed to deal with the immediate threat, and over the following nights U-123 was presented with a succession of easy targets, most of them burning navigation lamps. At times, U-123 was operating in coastal waters that were so shallow that they barely allowed it to conceal itself, let alone evade a depth charge attack.

=== Operation Drumbeat ===
The first attack wave, Operation Drumbeat, consisted of five Type IX boats. Their first victory upon arriving in the coastal region of North America was the Canadian freighter Cyclops, sunk on 12 January off Nova Scotia. According to Robert Fisher, 26 more ships were sunk in the following nine days. The boats cruised along the coast, safely submerged through the day, and surfacing at night to pick off merchant vessels outlined against the lights of the cities.

- Reinhard Hardegen in U-123 sank seven ships totaling 46,744 tons before he ran out of torpedoes and returned to base;
- Ernst Kals in U-130 sank six ships of 36,988 tons;
- Robert-Richard Zapp in U-66 sank five ships of 33,456 tons;
- Heinrich Bleichrodt in U-109 sank four ships of 27,651 tons; and
- Ulrich Folkers on his first patrol in U-125 sank one 6,666-ton vessel, the West Ivis (he was criticized by Dönitz for his poor performance, although he would later win the Knight's Cross of the Iron Cross).

When the first wave of U-boats returned to port through the early part of February, Dönitz wrote that each commander;

had such an abundance of opportunities for attack that he could not by any means utilize them all: there were times when there were up to ten ships in sight, sailing with all lights burning on peacetime courses.

The RCN immediately organized coastal convoys when Drumbeat began despite the difficulty in finding escorts. 37 ships were lost in January and February, and only 11 in March and April. The RCN noted that by March and April the U-boats preferred hunting in US waters.

=== U-boats in the Caribbean and the Gulf of Mexico ===
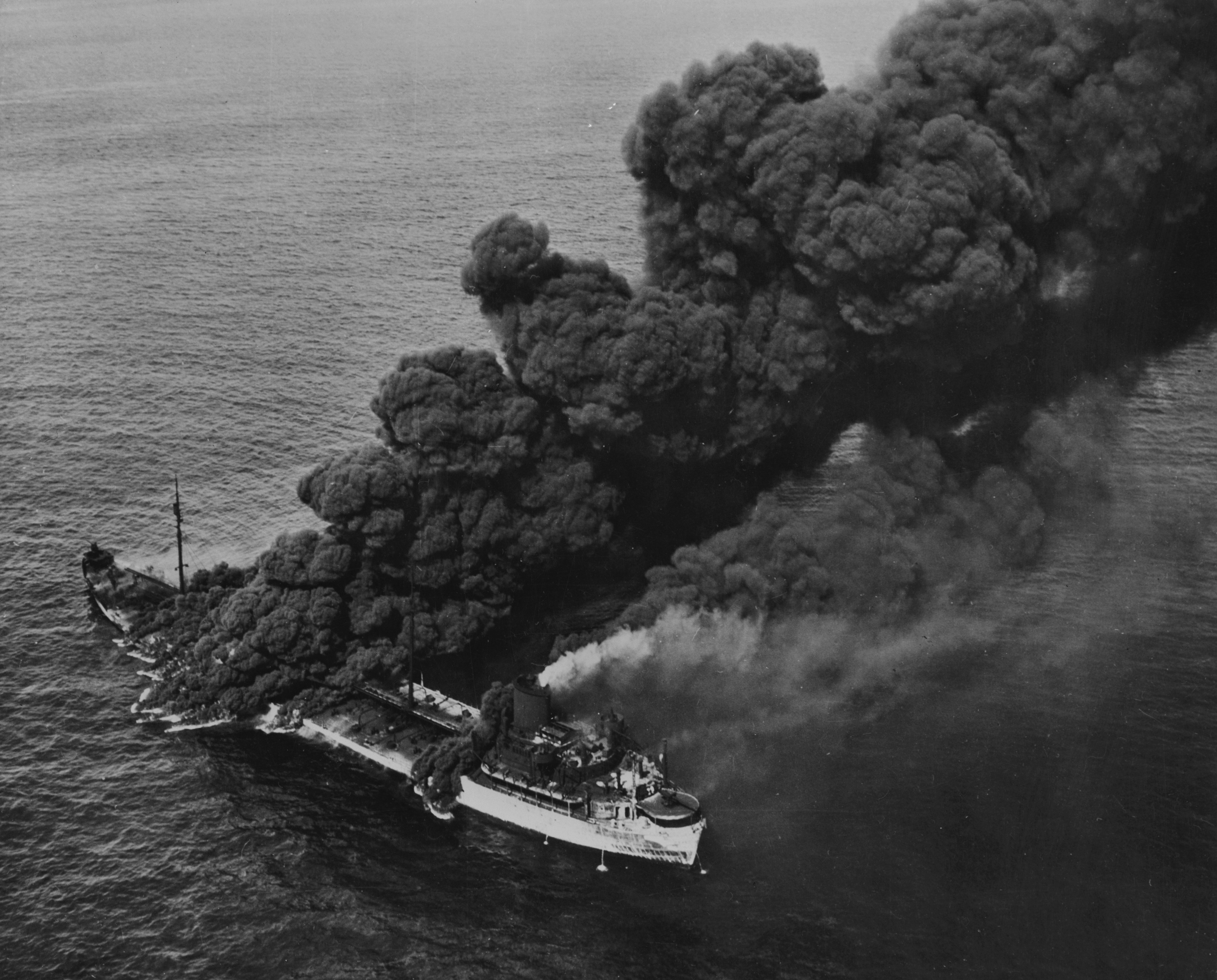
The tanker Pennsylvania Sun torpedoed by U-571 on 15 July 1942 (was saved and returned to service in 1943).

The second wave of Type IX boats had arrived in North American waters, and the third wave (Operation Neuland) had reached its patrol area off the oil ports of the Caribbean. With such easy pickings and all Type IX boats already committed, Dönitz began sending shorter-range Type VIIs to the US East Coast as well. This required extraordinary measures: cramming every conceivable space with provisions, some even filling the fresh water tanks with diesel oil, and crossing the Atlantic at very low speed on a single engine to conserve fuel.

In the United States there was still no concerted response to the attacks. Responsibility rested with King, but he was preoccupied with the Japanese onslaught in the Pacific. Andrews' North Atlantic Coastal Frontier was expanded to take in South Carolina and renamed the Eastern Sea Frontier (ESF), but most of the ships and aircraft needed remained under the command of Admiral Royal E. Ingersoll, Commander-in-Chief, Atlantic Fleet, who was often at sea and unavailable to make decisions. Rodger Winn's detailed weekly U-boat situation reports from the Submarine Tracking Room in London were available but ignored. By April, Allied forces along the US east coast included 80 small patrol ships in the ESF, 160 US aircraft, 24 RN ASW trawlers, and one British Coastal Command squadron. By British and Canadian standards these were enough to begin convoying, but no comprehensive convoy system was implemented that month. Instead, on 1 April the US implemented a partial convoy system where convoys moved along the coast in short hops, moving during daytime and stopping in protected anchorages during nights; these were slow and ineffective.

Coastal forces were reinforced from the Mid-Ocean Escort Force (MOEF) before March. The US contribution to the MOEF fell to part of one group. Five RCN corvettes were withdrawn to escort the new Boston-Halifax convoys, the first convoys along the American seaboard. In April, a RN group redeployed to the Caribbean to defend tankers. The RCN attempted to reinforce the MOEF by using training ships in supporting roles.

Allied tanker losses were alarming. Losses along the North American coast and in the Caribbean accounted for most of the 73 American tankers lost in the first half of 1942, and 22 British tankers lost in March; three out of the four largest Canadian tankers were also lost from February to May. In March, British Prime Minister Winston Churchill urged the USN to organize coastal convoys, to little effect. The next month, British tankers from the Caribbean avoided the US coast and sailed east to Freetown in Africa, while between 16 and 29 April the US ordered US and Caribbean coastal waters closed to commercial tanker movement. On 26 April, the US agreed to allow Britain to redeploy a MOEF group to establish Caribbean convoys, but the US refused to start its own Caribbean convoys or to provide escorts.

Eastern Canada was dependent on imported oil from the Gulf of Mexico and the Caribbean. The crisis led to gasoline rationing on 1 April, and the potential consequences of the US-ordered halt to tanker movements were severe. On 28 April, the RCN started ad hoc convoys to bring Canadian and Canadian-charted tankers trapped in the US and the Caribbean back to Halifax. On 1 May, the Government of Canada insisted that Canadian tankers be escorted, leading the RCN to organize formal convoys to the Caribbean through US coastal waters. The RCN had only enough escorts to run convoys from Halifax to Trinidad (coded as TH); the loss of supply from other regional suppliers had to be accepted. In July, Trinidad was replaced by Aruba to accommodate British tanker movement. From May to August, fourteen convoys – including 76 tankers and 640 million litres (4 million barrels) of oil – were run without a single ship lost. The convoys were discontinued in August with the advent of the US's comprehensive convoying system. Canada also began convoys between Nova Scotia and Quebec City in May.

The search for Allied tankers and the support of U-459, a Type XIV, pushed the U-boat offensive into the Gulf of Mexico. On 21 April, U-459 was 600 miles north-west of Bermuda; it refuelled 14 U-boats through 6 May, including Type VIIs, headed for the Gulf and the Caribbean. In May, they sank 115 ships (of which 101 were steaming independently), about half being in the Gulf, with half of that tonnage being tankers. In June, they sank 122 ships, of which 108 were sailing independently. The Gulf Sea Frontier, formed in early February, had barely any resources and was ineffective.

=== US convoys arrive ===
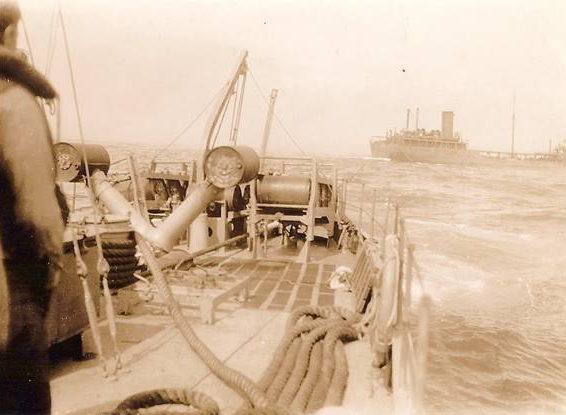
USCGC Dione escorts ships traveling in a convoy, June 1942

The first organized US coastal convoy sailed on 14 May 1942 from Hampton Roads for Key West; convoys eventually extended to Halifax. The US sought another 15 to 20 corvettes from Britain. By this time, two British escort groups were already in the Caribbean and the MOEF was under strain. Nonetheless, Britain and Canada responded to US requests by reducing the size of the remaining MOEF groups. The MOEF and the RCN had no further slack. The RCN struggled to meet its commitments even with 90% of its escort fleet being operational, as opposed to being used for training or being refitted; the negative effects of this over-extension would be felt well into 1943. By comparison the RN escort fleet was merely two-thirds operational. The weakening of MOEF contributed to difficulties in the mid-Atlantic in August.

The US convoy system effectively brought the crisis to an end. By early-July most U-boats only operated along the perimeter of the Caribbean. German attention returned to the mid-Atlantic.

== Losses ==
=== Allies ===
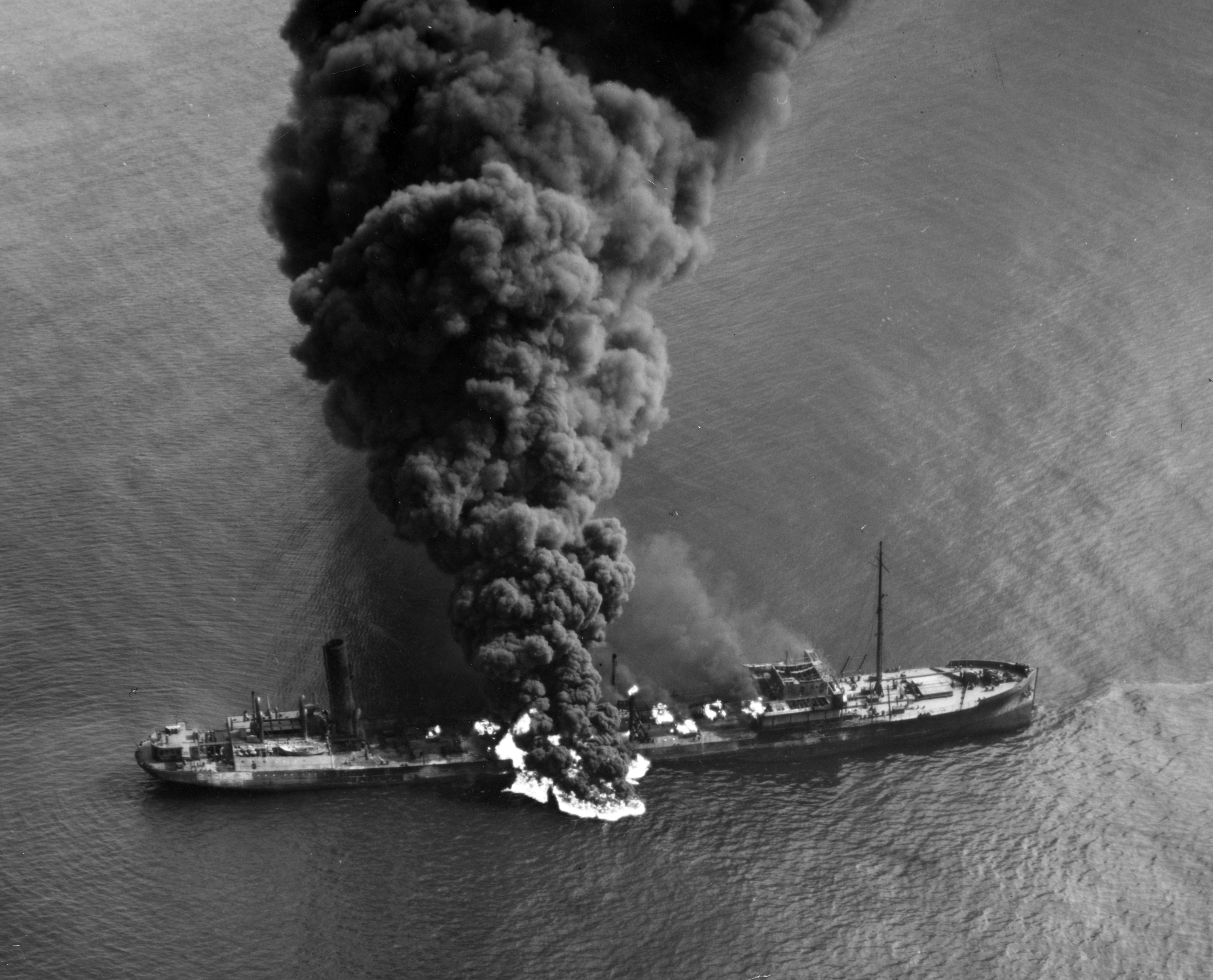
SS Byron D. Benson torpedoed on 4 April 1942 east of Southern Shores, North Carolina.

- 12 January – Canadian steamship Cyclops sunk by U-123 (87 of 182 crew, gunners, and passengers were lost)
- 14 January – Panamanian tanker Norness sunk by U-123 at 40.44°N 70.91°W
- 18 January – US tanker Allan Jackson sunk by U-66 at 35.95°N 74.33°W (23 of 35 crewmen perished)
- 18 January – US tanker Malay damaged by U-123 at 35.42°N 75.38°W (5 crewmen perished)
- 19 January – US steamship City of Atlanta sunk by U-123 at 35.70°N 75.35°W (43 of 46 crewmen perished)
- 19 January – Canadian steamship Lady Hawkins sunk by U-66 at 35.0°N 72.5°W (251 of 322 crew, gunners, and passengers were lost)
- 22 January – US freighter Norvana sunk by U-123 south of Cape Hatteras (no survivors)
- 23 January – US collier Venore sunk by U-66 at 35.83°N 75.33°W (17 of 41 crewmen perished)
- 25 January – US tanker Olney damaged by U-125 at 37.92°N 74.93°W
- 26 January – US freighter West Ivis sunk by U-125 (all 45 crewmen perished)
- 27 January – US tanker Francis E. Powell sunk by U-130 at 37.75°N 74.88°W (4 of 32 crewmen perished)
- 27 January – US tanker Halo damaged by U-130 at 35.55°N 75.33°W
- 30 January – US tanker Rochester sunk by U-106 at 37.17°N 73.97°W (3 of 32 crewmen perished)
- 31 January – US San Arcadio sunk by U-107 at 38.17°N 63.83°W
- 31 January – US Tacoma Star sunk by U-109 at 37.55°N 69.35°W
- 2 February – US tanker W.L. Steed sunk by U-103 at 38.42°N 72.72°W (34 of 38 crewmen perished)
- 3 February – Panamanian freighter San Gil sunk by U-103 at 38.08°N 74.67°W (2 of 40 crewmen perished)
- 4 February – US tanker India Arrow sunk by U-103 at 38.80°N 73.67°W (26 of 38 crewmen perished)
- 5 February – US tanker China Arrow sunk by U-103 at 38.73°N 73.30°W
- 6 February – US freighter Major Wheeler sunk by U-107 (all 35 crewmen perished)
- 8 February – British freighter Ocean Venture sunk by U-108 at 37.08°N 74.75°W (31 of 45 crew, and gunners were lost)
- 10 February – Canadian tanker Victolite sunk by U-564 at 36.20°N 67.23°W (all 47 crew and gunners were lost)
- 15 February – Brazilian steamship Buarque sunk by U-432 at 36.58°N 75.33°W
- 18 February – Brazilian tanker Olinda sunk by U-432 at 37.5°N 75.0°W
- 19 February – US tanker Pan Massachusetts sunk by U-128 at 28.45°N 80.13°W (20 of 38 crewmen perished)
- 20 February – US freighter Azalea City sunk by U-432 at 38.0°N 73.0°W (All 38 crewmen perished)
- 21 February – US tanker Republic sunk by U-504 at 27.08°N 80.25°W (5 of 29 crewmen perished)
- 22 February – US tanker Cities Service Empire sunk by U-128 at 28.00°N 80.27°W (14 of 50 crewmen perished)
- 22 February – US tanker W.D. Anderson sunk by U-504 at 27.15°N 79.93°W (35 of 36 crewmen perished)
- 26 February – US bulk carrier Marore sunk by U-432 at 35.55°N 74.97°W
- 26 February – US tanker R.P. Resor sunk by U-578 at 39.78°N 73.43°W (47 of 49 crewmen perished)
- 28 February – US destroyer Jacob Jones sunk by U-578 at 38.70°N 74.65°W
- 7 March – US freighter Barbara sunk by U-126 at 20.00°N 73.93°W
- 7 March – US freighter Cardonia sunk by U-126 at 19.88°N 73.45°W
- 7 March – Brazilian steamship Arabutan sunk by U-155 at 35.25°N 73.92°W
- 9 March – Brazilian steamship Cayru sunk by U-94 at 39.16°N 72.03°W
- 10 March – US tanker Gulftrade sunk by U-588 at 39.84°N 73.87°W
- 11 March – US freighter Texan sunk by U-126 at 21.53°N 76.40°W
- 11 March – US freighter Caribsea sunk by U-158 at 34.67°N 76.16°W
- 12 March – US tanker John D. Gill sunk by U-158 at 35.92°N 77.65°W (4 crewmen perished)
- 12 March – US freighter Olga sunk by U-126 at 23.65°N 77.00°W
- 12 March – US freighter Colabee damaged by U-126 at 22.23°N 77.58°W
- 13 March – US schooner Albert F. Paul sunk by U-332 at 26.0°N 72.0°W (no survivors)
- 13 March – Chilean freighter Tolten sunk by U-404 at 40.16°N 73.84°W (15 of 16 crewmen perished)
- 14 March – US collier Lemuel Burrows sunk by U-404 at 39.20°N 74.27°W
- 15 March – US tanker Ario sunk by U-158 at 34.33°N 76.65°W (7 of 36 crewmen perished)
- 15 March – US tanker Olean sunk by U-158 at 34.40°N 76.48°W
- 16 March – US tanker Australia sunk by U-332 at 35.12°N 75.37°W
- 16 March – British tanker San Demetrio sunk by U-404 at 37.05°N 73.84°W (19 of 51 crew, and gunners were lost)
- 17 March – US tanker Acme damaged by U-124 at 35.10°N 76.67°W
- 17 March – Greek freighter Kassandra Louloudis sunk by U-124 four mile off Diamond Shoals gas buoy
- 17 March – Norwegian tanker Ranja sunk by U-71 near Diamond Shoals (All 34 crew perished)
- 17 March – Honduran freighter Ceiba sunk by U-124 at 35.72°N 73.82°W
- 18 March – US tanker E.M. Clark sunk by U-124 at 34.84°N 75.58°W
- 18 March – US tanker Papoose sunk by U-124 at 34.28°N 76.65°W
- 18 March – US tanker W.E. Hutton sunk by U-332 at 34.08°N 76.67°W (13 of 36 crewmen perished)
- 19 March – US freighter Liberator sunk by U-332 at 35.08°N 75.50°W (5 crewmen perished)
- 20 March – US tanker Oakmar sunk by U-71 at 36.35°N 68.84°W (6 of 36 crewmen perished)
- 21 March – US tanker Esso Nashville sunk by U-124 at 33.58°N 77.37°W
- 21 March – US tanker Atlantic Sun damaged by U-124
- 22 March – US tanker Naeco sunk by U-124 at 33.98°N 76.67°W (24 of 39 crewmen perished)
- 25 March – Dutch tanker Ocana sunk by U-552 at 42.60°N 64.42°W
- 26 March – US Q-ship USS Atik sunk by U-123 at 36.0°N 70.0°W (All 139 crewmen perished)
- 26 March – US tanker Dixie Arrow sunk by U-71 at 34.98°N 75.55°W (11 of 33 crewmen perished)
- 26 March – Panamanian tanker Equipoise sunk by U-160 at 36.60°N 74.75°W
- 29 March – US steamship City of New York sunk by U-160 at 35.27°N 74.42°W (24 of 157 crewmen perished)
- 31 March – US tug Menominee and barges Allegheny and Barnegat sunk by U-754 at 37.57°N 75.42°W
- 31 March – US tanker Tiger sunk by U-754 (1 of 43 crewmen perishes)
- 31 March – British tanker San Gerardo sunk by U-71 (50 crew, out of 56, and 1 passenger perished)
- 1 April – British merchant Eastmoor sunk by U-71 (16 of 52 crew perished)
- 3 April – US freighter Otho sunk by U-754 at 36.42°N 71.95°W (31 of 53 crewmen perished)
- 4 April – US tanker Byron D. Benson sunk by U-552 at 36.13°N 75.53°W (9 of 37 crewmen perished)
- 6 April – US tanker Bidwell damaged by U-160 34.42°N 75.95°W (1 of 33 crewmen perishes)
- 7 April – Norwegian freighter Lancing sunk by U-552 off Cape Hatteras
- 7 April – British tanker British Splendour sunk by U-552 off Cape Hatteras (12 of 53 crew and gunners were lost)
- 8 April – US tanker Oklahoma damaged by U-123 at 31.30°N 80.98°W (19 of 37 crewmen perished)
- 8 April – US tanker Esso Baton Rouge damaged by U-123 at 31.22°N 80.08°W (3 of 39 crewmen perished)
- 9 April – US freighter Esparta sunk by U-123 30.77°N 81.18°W (1 of 40 crewmen perishes)
- 9 April – US freighter Malchace sunk by U-160 at 34.47°N 75.93°W (1 of 29 crewmen perished)
- 9 April – US tanker Atlas sunk by U-552 at 34.45°N 76.27°W (2 of 34 crewmen perished)
- 9 April – tanker Tamaulipas sunk by U-552 at 34.42°N 76.00°W (2 of 37 crewmen perished)
- 10 April – US tanker Gulfamerica sunk by U-123 at 30.23°N 81.30°W (19 of 48 crewmen perished)
- 11 April – US tanker Harry F. Sinclair Jr. damaged by U-203 at 34.42°N 76.50°W (10 of 36 crewmen perished)
- 11 April – British steamship Ulysses sunk by U-160 at 34.38°N 75.58°W (all 290 crew, gunners, and passengers rescued)
- 12 April – Panamanian tanker Stanvac Melbourne sunk by U-203 at 33.88°N 77.48°W
- 12 April – US freighter Leslie sunk by U-123 at 28.62°N 80.42°W (3 of 32 crewmen perished)
- 14 April – British freighter Empire Thrush sunk by U-203 at 35.20°N 75.23°W (all 55 crew and gunners rescued)
- 14 April – US freighter Margaret sunk by U-571 at 35.20°N 75.23°W (All 29 crewmen perished)
- 15 April – US freighter Robin Hood sunk by U-575 at 38.65°N 66.63°W (14 of 38 crewmen perished)
- 16 April – US freighter Alcoa Guide sunk by U-123 at 35.57°N 70.13°W (6 of 34 crewmen perished)
- 17 April – Argentine tanker Victoria damaged by U-201 at 36.68°N 68.80°W
- 18 April – US tanker Axtell J. Byles damaged by U-136 at 35.53°N 75.32°W
- 19 April – US freighter Steel Maker sunk by U-136 at 33.08°N 70.60°W (1 of 45 crewmen perished)
- 20 April – US freighter West Imboden sunk by U-752 at 41.23°N 65.90°W
- 21 April – US freighter Pipestone County sunk by U-576 at 37.58°N 66.33°W
- 21 April – US freighter San Jacinto sunk by U-201 at 31.16°N 70.75°W (14 of 183 crewmen perished)
- 29 April – US tanker Mobiloil sunk by U-108 at 26.16°N 66.25°W
- 29 April – US tanker Federal sunk by U-507 at 21.22°N 76.08°W (5 of 33 crewmen perished)
- 2 May – US armed yacht Cythera sunk by U-402 off North Carolina (66 of 68 crewmen perished)
- 4 May – US tanker Norlindo sunk by U-507 at 24.95°N 84.00°W (5 of 28 crewmen perished)
- 4 May – US tanker Munger T. Ball sunk by U-507 at 25.28°N 83.95°W (30 of 34 crewmen perished)
- 4 May – US tanker Joseph M. Cudahy sunk by U-507 at 25.95°N 83.95°W (27 of 37 crewmen perished)
- 4 May – US freighter Delisle damaged by U-564 at 27.03°N 80.05°W (2 of 36 crewmen perished)
- 5 May – US freighter Afoundria sunk by U-108 at 20.0°N 73.50°W
- 5 May – US tanker Java Arrow damaged by U-333 at 27.50°N 80.13°W (2 of 47 crewmen perished)
- 6 May – US tanker Halsey sunk by U-333 at 27.23°N 80.05°W (5 of 28 crewmen perished)
- 6 May – US freighter Alcoa Puritan sunk by U-507 at 28.67°N 88.37°W
- 8 May – US freighter Ohioan sunk by U-564 at 26.52°N 79.97°W (15 of 37 crewmen perished)
- 10 May – US tanker Aurora damaged by U-506 at 28.58°N 90.00°W (1 of 50 crewmen perished)
- 12 May – US tanker Virginia sunk by U-507 at 28.88°N 89.48°W (27 of 41 crewmen perished)
- 13 May – US tanker Gulfprince damaged by U-507 at 28.53°N 91.00°W
- 13 May – US tanker Gulfpenn sunk by U-506 at 28.48°N 89.20°W (13 of 38 crewmen perished)
- 13 May – US freighter David McKelvy sunk by U-506 at 28.50°N 89.92°W (17 of 36 crewmen perished)
- 15 May – US freighter Nicarao sunk by U-751 at 25.33°N 74.32°W (8 of 39 crewmen perished)
- 16 May – US tanker Sun damaged by U-506 at 28.68°N 90.32°W
- 16 May – US tanker William C. McTarnahan damaged by U-506 at 28.87°N 90.33°W (18 of 38 crewmen perished)
- 16 May – US tanker Gulfoil sunk by U-506 at 28.68°N 90.32°W (21 of 40 crewmen perished)
- 19 May – US freighter Heredia sunk by U-506 at 27.53°N 91.00°W (36 of 62 crewmen perished)
- 19 May – US freighter Ogontz sunk by U-103 at 23.5°N 86.62°W (19 of 41 crewmen perished)
- 20 May – US tanker Halo sunk by U-506 at 28.70°N 90.13°W (21 of 42 crewmen perished)
- 20 May – US freighter George Calvert sunk by U-752 at 22.92°N 84.43°W (3 of 61 crewmen perished)
- 21 May – US freighter Plow City sunk by U-588 at 39.13°N 69.95°W (1 of 30 crewmen perished)
- 26 May – US tanker Carrabulle sunk by U-106 at 26.15°N 89.35°W (22 of 40 crewmen perished)
- 26 May – US freighter Atenas damaged by U-106 at 25.84°N 89.08°W
- 30 May – US freighter Alcoa Shipper sunk by U-404 at 37.82°N 65.25°W (7 of 32 crewmen perished)
- 1 June – US freighter West Notus sunk by U-404 at 34.16°N 68.33°W (4 of 40 crewmen perished)
- 1 June – US freighter Hampton Roads sunk by U-106 at 23.0°N 85.7°W (5 of 28 crewmen perished)
- 3 June – US freighter M.F. Elliott sunk by U-502 off the Florida Keys (13 of 45 crewmen perished)
- 10 June – US tanker Hagan sunk by U-157 at 22.0°N 77.5°W (6 of 44 crewmen perished)
- 12 June – US tanker Cities Service Toledo sunk by U-158 at 29.03°N 91.98°W (15 of 45 crewmen perished)

=== Germany ===
- U-85: sunk on 14 April by the destroyer USS Roper in position 35.92°N 75.22°W off Cape Hatteras, the first sinking in US waters
- U-352: sunk on 9 May by the cutter USCGC Icarus in position 34.20°N 76.58°W off Cape Hatteras
- U-157: sunk on 13 June by the cutter USCGC Thetis in position 24.22°N 82.05°W off Havana, Cuba
- U-158: sunk on 30 June by a Mariner aircraft (USN VP-74) in position 32.83°N 67.47°W west of Bermuda
- U-215: sunk on 3 July by the Armed ASW Trawler HMS Le Tiger in position 41.48°N 66.38°W by depth charges
- U-701: sunk on 7 July by a Lockheed Hudson aircraft in position 34.83°N 74.92°W off Cape Hatteras
- U-153: sunk on 13 July by the destroyer USS Lansdowne in position 9.93°N 81.48°W off Colón, Panama
- U-576: sunk on 15 July by two Vought OS2U Kingfisher aircraft and shelling from the USS Unicoi in position 34.85°N 75.37°W off Cape Hatteras
- U-166: sunk on 30 July by the US Navy patrol craft, PC 566, in position 28.52°N 90.75°W in the Gulf of Mexico, the only U-boat sunk in the Gulf of Mexico during World War II
- U-94: sunk on 27 August 1942 by a PBY-5A Catalina from VP-92 and HMCS Oakville in position 17.40°N 74.30°W.
- U-165: sunk on 27 September 1942 by a Vickers Wellington of 311/Q Squadron, RAF (with a Czech aircrew)
- U-132: sunk on 5 November 1942 by aircraft of No. 120 Squadron RAF.
- U-517: sunk 17 November 1942 by Fairey Albacores of 817 Naval Air Squadron from the aircraft carrier HMS Victorious.l
- U-553: lost at sea 28 January 1943
- U-69: active in the east coast operations, rammed and sunk on 17 February 1943 by HMS Fame
- U-106: active in the east coast operations, sunk 2 August 1943, by aircraft attack by No. 461 Squadron RAAF flown by Flight Lieutenant A. F. Clarke.

== Sources ==
- Blair, Clay (1996). Hitler's U-Boat War: The Hunters 1939–1942. Random House. ISBN 0394588398.
- Churchill, Winston (1950). The Hinge of Fate. The Second World War. Boston: Houghton Mifflin Company.
- Cressman, R. J. (2000). The Official Chronology of the U.S. Navy in World War II. Annapolis: Naval Institute Press. ISBN 1557501491.
- Fairbank White, David (2006). Bitter Ocean: The dramatic story of the Battle of the Atlantic 1939–1945. Headline Publishing Group. ISBN 9780755310890.
- Fisher, Robert C. (April 1993). "'We'll Get Our Own': Canada And The Oil Shipping Crisis Of 1942" (PDF). The Northern Mariner. 3 (2). Canadian Nautical Research Society; North American Society for Oceanic History: 33–39. doi:10.25071/2561-5467.772. S2CID 247653126.
- Gannon, Michael (1990). Operation Drumbeat: The Dramatic True Story of Germany's First U-Boat Attacks Along the American Coast in World War II. New York: Harper and Row. ISBN 0-06-016155-8.
- Milner, Marc (2011). Battle of the Atlantic (2nd ed.). Stroud: The History Press. ISBN 978-0-7524-6646-0.
- Tennant, Alan J. (2001). British and Commonwealth Merchant Ship Losses to Axis Submarines 1939–1945. Sutton. ISBN 0750927607.
- U-Boat War, BFS Video, 2001, ASIN B00005BGQZ. UPC 066805814440.
