= Tonnage war =

Military strategy aimed at merchant shipping

A tonnage war is a military strategy aimed at merchant shipping. The premise is that the enemy has a finite number of ships and a finite capacity to build replacements. The concept was made famous by German Grand Admiral Karl Dönitz, who wrote:

"The shipping of the enemy powers is one great whole. It is therefore in this connection immaterial where a ship is sunk—it must still in the final analysis be replaced by a new ship".

Most anti-shipping strategies have had a relatively narrow set of goals. A traditional practice of the Royal Navy during wars between Britain and France was the blockade. By concentrating naval forces near large French ports, the Royal Navy was usually able to impede French trade to the point of creating significant economic difficulties. The opponent may focus on ships carrying strategically vital cargoes such as hemp and timber or, in modern times, oil and iron. The aim might be to attack ships carrying particularly valuable cargoes such as treasure or munitions and ships carrying less important cargoes or steaming in ballast are at first ignored.

These narrow strategies require the attacker to establish substantial control over an area. The British blockades of France were only possible so long as the Royal Navy retained the ability to defeat any French squadron venturing out from port. During the Siege of Malta in World War II, Axis air forces had air superiority and were able to prevent many Allied ships from reaching Malta with supplies, putting the island fortress in grave danger.

A tonnage war in general however is a broad strategy. As a form of attrition warfare, it does not require the attacker to establish control over an area, merely that they sink ships more rapidly than the defender can replace them.

== World War II ==
During World War II, three tonnage wars were fought. The largest and best known of them was Nazi Germany's U-boat campaign, aimed mainly against the United Kingdom. Less well-known campaigns were waged by Allied forces in the Mediterranean and Pacific theaters, neither of them deliberately planned as a tonnage war in the way that German U-boat campaign was, but both having that effect— and both were also very successful.

=== Atlantic ===
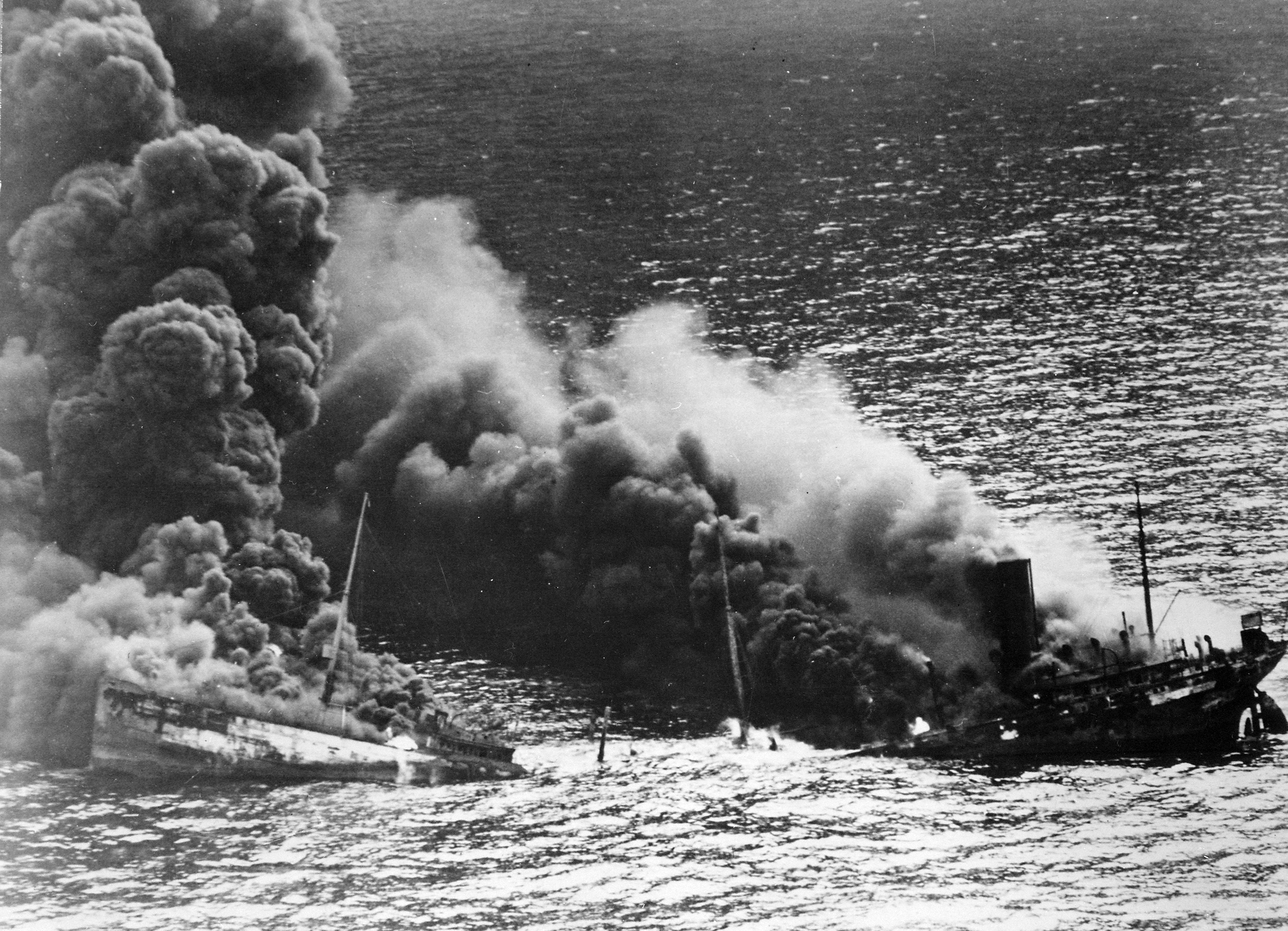
Allied tanker SS Dixie Arrow after being torpedoed during the Battle of the Atlantic, 1942

The German U-boat campaign, aimed mainly against the United Kingdom, was the largest and longest-running tonnage war of World War II. Although the primary venue for the campaign was the North Atlantic, Hitler sent U-boats and surface raiders to all corners of the globe in search of the most efficient way to sink the maximum number of ships at minimum cost. The U-boats campaign was very successful especially in the two "happy periods", of 1940 and of 1942, and was able to reduce the total shipping available to the Allies almost to a breaking point in 1943, when the tide of war started turning against Germany. On the other side, an important factor in the British anti-submarine effort was the success of the codebreakers at Bletchley Park in reading U-boat messages encrypted using the German Enigma machine. Even more important was the introduction of shipborne direction finders (known as HF/DF, or "Huff Duff").

It is maintained by some historians that the U-boat Arm came close to winning the Battle of the Atlantic; that the Allies were almost defeated; and that Britain was brought to the brink of starvation. Others, including Blair and Alan Levin, disagree; Levin states this is "a misperception", and that "it is doubtful they ever came close" to achieving this.

The focus on U-boat successes, the so-called "aces" and their scores, the convoys attacked, and the ships sunk, serves to camouflage the Kriegsmarine's manifold failures. In particular, this was because most of the ships sunk by U-boat were not in convoys, but sailing alone, or having become separated from convoys.

At no time during the campaign were supply lines to Britain interrupted; even during the Bismarck crisis, convoys sailed as usual, although with heavier escorts. In all, during the Atlantic Campaign only 10% of transatlantic convoys that sailed were attacked, and of those attacked only an average of 10% of the ships were lost. Overall, more than 99% of all ships sailing to and from the British Isles during World War II did so successfully.

Despite their efforts, the Axis powers were unable to prevent the build-up of Allied invasion forces for the liberation of Europe. In November 1942, at the height of the Atlantic campaign, the US Navy escorted the Operation Torch invasion fleet 3,000 mi (4,800 km) across the Atlantic without hindrance, or even being detected, in what may be the ultimate example of the Allied practice of evasive routing. In 1943 and 1944 the Allies transported some 3 million American and Allied servicemen across the Atlantic without significant loss.

Unlike the Allies, Germany was never able to mount a comprehensive blockade of Britain. Nor were they able to focus their effort by targeting the most valuable cargoes, the eastbound traffic carrying war materiel. Instead they were reduced to the slow attrition of a tonnage war. To win this, the U-boat arm had to sink 300,000 GRT per month in order to overwhelm Britain's shipbuilding capacity and reduce its merchant marine strength.

In only four out of the first 27 months of the war did Germany achieve this target, while after December 1941, when Britain was joined by the US merchant marine and ship yards the target effectively doubled. As a result, the Axis needed to sink 700,000 GRT per month; as the massive expansion of the US shipbuilding industry took effect this target increased still further. The 700,000 ton target was achieved in only one month, November 1942, while after May 1943 average sinkings dropped to less than one tenth of that figure.

By the end of the war, although the U-boat arm had sunk 6,000 ships totalling 21 million GRT, the Allies had built over 38 million tons of new shipping.

The reason for the misperception that the German blockade came close to success may be found in post-war writings by both German and British authors. Blair attributes the distortion to "propagandists" who "glorified and exaggerated the successes of German submariners", while he believes Allied writers "had their own reasons for exaggerating the peril".

Dan van der Vat suggests that, unlike the US, or Canada and Britain's other dominions, which were protected by oceanic distances, Britain was at the end of the transatlantic supply route closest to German bases; for Britain it was a lifeline. It is this which led to Churchill's concerns. Coupled with a series of major convoy battles in the space of a month, it undermined confidence in the convoy system in March 1943, to the point Britain considered abandoning it, not realising the U-boat had already effectively been defeated. These were "over-pessimistic threat assessments", Blair concludes: "At no time did the German U-boat force ever come close to winning the Battle of the Atlantic or bringing on the collapse of Great Britain".

=== Mediterranean ===
The second tonnage war was the Allied campaign against Axis shipping, mostly Italian, from Europe to North Africa, in the Mediterranean theatre. British submarines based in Malta and the aircraft of several Allied air forces, in conjunction with British and Commonwealth surface ships, reduced shipments of essential military supplies such as oil to Axis forces under German Field Marshal Rommel to the point where the Germans there were unable to fight effectively. By the close of the campaign, Italy had very few merchant ships left.

There was another tonnage war in the Mediterranean, as Gibraltar convoys battled against Axis aircraft, Axis submarines and the Italian Navy to deliver supplies and equipment to Malta, which was under siege by air and sea. The deliveries enabled Malta to resist persistent air attacks and take the offensive against Axis convoys.

=== Pacific ===
In the early years of the Pacific War, the submarines of the US Navy were allocated a great variety of tasks and were unable to achieve many of them effectively, particularly given major technical problems with the Mark 14 torpedoes early in the war as well as lack of aggression on the part of US submarine crews.

Despite an awareness that shipping was vital, the Japanese military seriously underestimated the eventual threat from Allied submarines. This overconfidence was reinforced by the ineffectiveness of the early activities of Allied submarines in the Pacific War. Anti-submarine warfare was accorded a low priority and few warships and aircraft were allocated to protecting merchant shipping. Japanese destroyers formed the bulk of convoy protection throughout the war, while the Allies recognized earlier the need to use the more economical destroyer escorts for convoys, something the Japanese realized too late. The Japanese had impressive night fighting capabilities and heavy torpedo loadouts, but had deficiencies in sonar and radar compared to other navies. Moreover, Japanese Naval doctrine in relation to commerce defense was quite poor.

During the summer of 1943, substantial numbers of American submarines were tasked with disrupting Japanese trade, in particular the cutting off of the flow of oil and other vital materials from the occupied territories of South-east Asia to Japan. This too, became a tonnage war, with rapidly increasing results, and by mid to late 1944 Allied submarines and aircraft were experiencing difficulty in finding targets large enough to be worth a torpedo. The Japanese merchant navy was all but wiped out, and despite desperate measures to make do without strategic materials, the war economy ground to a virtual standstill.

Japanese submarines, despite their technical prowess and numbers, were used for fleet warfare instead of against the Allied merchant marine in the Pacific theater, thus Allied shipping lanes in the Pacific were not disrupted.

In and around New Guinea and the Solomon Islands, the Japanese resorted to destroyers and submarines, known as the Tokyo Express, to deliver supplies. Particularly in the Guadalcanal campaign the Japanese Navy was caught in a Catch-22 situation, since American airpower from Henderson Field denied the Japanese the use of merchantmen (slow cargo ships). Compared to destroyers, merchantman were much more economical in fuel usage while having the capacity to carry full loads of troops plus sufficient equipment and supplies. The Japanese Navy was in essence forced to "fight as uneconomical a campaign as could possibly be imagined", since in using destroyers they had to "expend much larger quantities of fuel than they wanted" considering Japan's disadvantage in oil supply, and this "fuel was used to place very valuable, and vulnerable, fleet destroyers in an exposed forward position while delivering an insufficient quantity of men and supplies to the American meatgrinder on the island". Allied aircraft would prove to be decisive in wiping out Japanese troop convoys, such as the Battle of the Bismarck Sea, despite aircover, and the Battle of Ormoc Bay.

== See also ==
- Naval strategy
- Commerce raiding
- Unrestricted submarine warfare
- Merchant raider

== Sources ==
- Blair, Clay Jr. (1996). Hitler's U-Boat War: The Hunters 1939–1942. Vol. I. Cassell. ISBN 978-0-304-35260-9.
- Costello, John; Hughes, Terry (1977). The Battle of the Atlantic. London: Collins. OCLC 464381083.
- Roskill, S. W. (1961). The War at Sea. Vol. III. Part 2. London: HMSO. OCLC 226236418.
