= SS San Gerardo =

British oil tanker (1922–1942)

History
- Name: San Gerardo
- Owner: Eagle Oil and Shipping Company
- Port of registry: (United Kingdom) London
- Route: United Kingdom–Mexico
- Ordered: 1 February 1920
- Builder: Palmer’s Shipbuilding and Iron Company
- Yard number: 870
- Launched: 19 October 1921
- Completed: February 1922
- In service: 1922
- Out of service: 1942
- Identification: Call sign: GFDW; Official number: 146518
- Fate: Sunk on 31 March 1942

General characteristics
- Type: Oil tanker
- Tonnage: 12,915 GRT; 19,245 DWT
- Length: 530 ft (160 m)
- Beam: 64 ft (20 m)
- Depth: 30.9 ft (9.4 m)
- Installed power: 3 × steam turbines, 5 × boilers
- Propulsion: 1 screw
- Speed: 10 knots (19 km/h; 12 mph)

SS San Gerardo was a British oil tanker built in 1922 for the Eagle Oil and Shipping Company. She was torpedoed on 31 March 1942, by the German submarine U-71.

== Construction ==
San Gerardo was ordered on 1 February 1920, launched on 19 October 1921 and completed in February 1922. She was built by Palmer’s Shipbuilding and Iron Company in Newcastle-Upon-Tyne. The tanker was yard number 870 and was assigned the Official number 146518 and the call sign GFWK. She was registered in London.

=== Specifications ===
San Gerardo was 530 feet (160 m) long, 64 feet (20 m) wide, and had a depth of 30.9 feet (9.4 m). She had three Palmer's steam turbines geared to one screw shaft and five single boilers with 15 total corrugated furnaces. The tanker had one four-bladed propeller and a maximum speed of 10 knots (19 km/h; 12 mph). She was assessed at 12,915 gross register tons (GRT) and 19,245 tons deadweight (DWT).

== Service history ==
San Gerardo operated for the Eagle Oil and Shipping Company. She primarily traveled between the United Kingdom and Mexico, notably the ports of Tilbury in Essex and Tampico in Tamaulipas. She carried a cargo primarily consisting of crude oil from Mexico to the United Kingdom.

== Sinking ==
San Gerardo left for her final voyage from Curaçao, capital of the Dutch West Indies, on 23 March 1942. The tanker loaded 17,000 tons of fuel oil and was bound for Halifax, Nova Scotia, where she would join a convoy to carry her cargo to the United Kingdom. She was under the command of Captain Stanley Foley, and carried 57 people total: 56 officers and crewmembers, as well as one passenger.

On 31 March, San Gerardo found herself sailing up the East Coast of the United States. She was 350 nautical miles (650 km; 400 mi) north-northwest of Bermuda, 230 nautical miles (430 km; 260 mi) south-southeast of Nantucket Island, and 475 nautical miles (880 km; 547 mi) south of Halifax. She entered the waters of North Carolina and neared the German submarine U-71, which had sunk the Norwegian tanker Ranja, the American cargo ship Oakmar, and the American oil tanker Dixie Arrow in the previous days.

At 3:22 PM Eastern War Time, U-71 fired two torpedoes at San Gerardo. The tanker rapidly sank by the stern, with none of her lifeboats being launched. Two life rafts floated off the ship and were promptly occupied by three sailors and three naval gunners. They were picked up on 2 April, after floating for three days, by the British tanker Regent Panther and taken to Halifax. 51 people, including the passenger, perished.
