= Eastmoor (disambiguation) =

Eastmoor is a neighbourhood of Wakefield, England.

Eastmoor may also refer to:

- Eastmoor, Derbyshire, England
- Eastmoor, Ohio, a neighbourhood of Columbus, Ohio, US
  - Eastmoor Academy, a public high school in Eastmoor, Ohio
- SS Eastmoor, a British merchant ship built in 1922 for the Moor Line
