= MV City of New York =

Ship sunk off Cape Hatteras in World War II

History
- Name: City of New York
- Owner: American-South African Line
- Operator: American-South African Line; United States Merchant Marine
- Route: Lourenço Marques - Cape Town - Port of Spain - New York City
- Builder: Sun Shipbuilding & Dry Dock Co.
- Yard number: 116
- Laid down: March 12, 1929
- Launched: October 19, 1929
- Completed: January 18, 1930
- In service: February 1, 1930
- Fate: Sunk March 29, 1942

General characteristics
- Type: Passenger ship
- Tonnage: 8,272 GRT
- Length: 452 ft (138 m)
- Installed power: 2 x 8 Cyl. 2SCSA diesel engines, dual shaft, 2 screws
- Propulsion: Twin-screw
- Speed: 14 knots (26 km/h; 16 mph)
- Capacity: 60 passengers
- Armament: 1 × 4-inch/50-caliber gun; 4 × 3-inch/50-caliber guns; 4 × 6-inch/30-caliber guns

MV City of New York was an American passenger ship built in 1930 for the American-South African Line. She later entered service with the United States Merchant Marine to deliver chromite to help build ships in her namesake New York City. She was sunk off Cape Hatteras, part of the North Carolinian Outer Banks, on March 29, 1942, after being torpedoed by the German U-boat U-160.

== Design ==
City of New York was designed with two propellers, powered by two eight cylinder diesel engines. The vessel was equipped with five lifeboats; four of them attached to davits and one sitting on the roof of the poop deck. The ship had a single funnel. City of New York was designed to accommodate around 60 passengers.

=== Construction ===
City of New York was designed in the late 1920s and constructed in 1930 by Sun Shipbuilding & Drydock Co. at Chester, Pennsylvania. Her keel was laid on March 12, 1929, as yard number 116. She slid down the slipways on October 19 of that same year. City of New York was completed on January 30, 1930, and she took her maiden voyage that February. She was the first ship built for the American-South African Line.

== Service history ==
=== American-South African Line ===
The ship was placed on a route going from Lourenço Marques, to Cape Town, to Port of Spain, and the finally to New York. The entire voyage took around four months. The ship was sold to the United States Merchant Marine in 1941.

=== United States Merchant Marine ===
City of New York was outfitted with one 4-inch/50-caliber gun on the stern, as well as four 3-inch/50-caliber guns and four 6-inch/30-caliber guns across the decks of the ship. The ship was also to be manned by sailors of the United States Merchant Marine.

== Final voyage ==
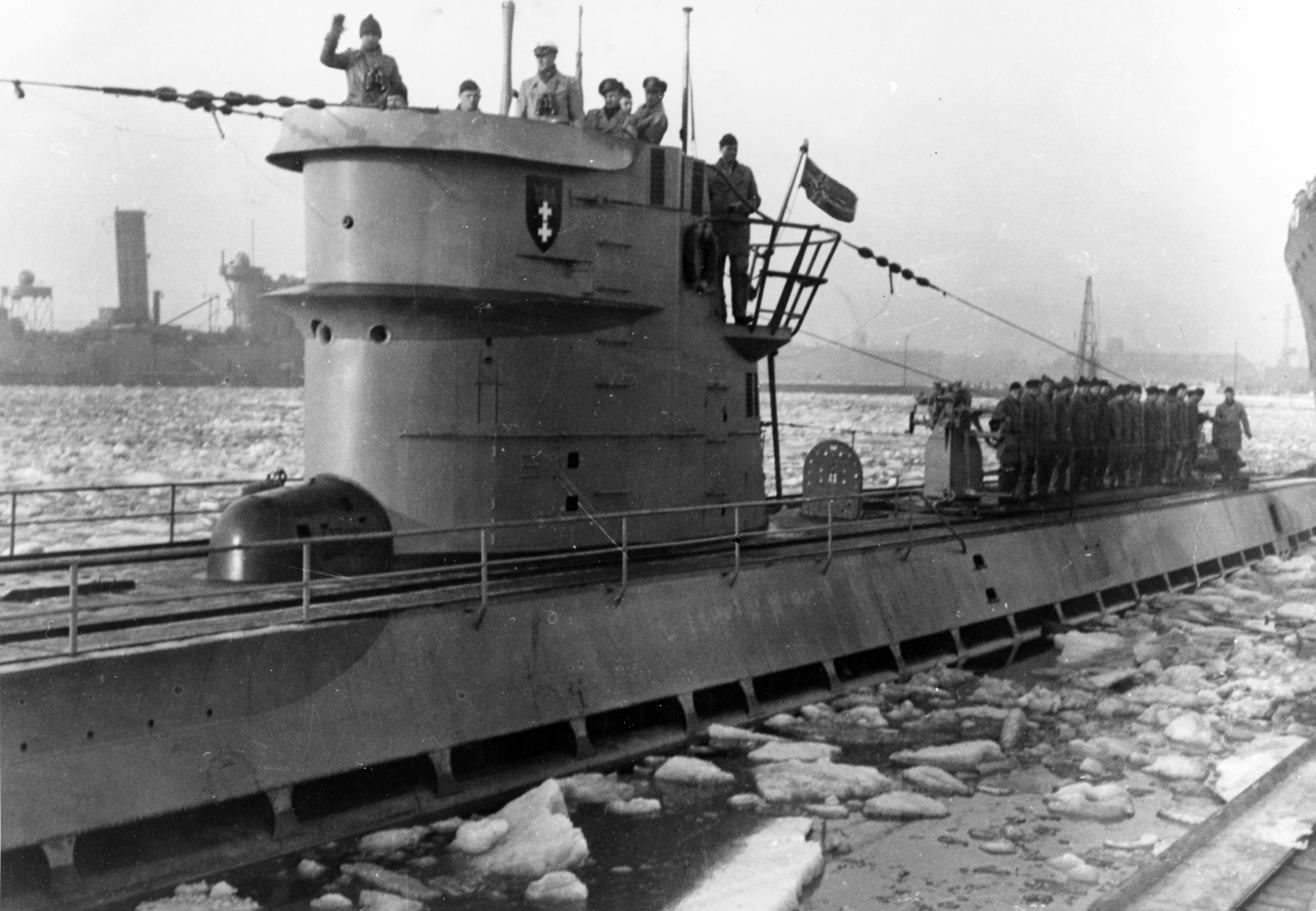
A German Type-IX submarine, not unlike U-160, the German U-boat that sank City of New York

=== Initial voyage ===
144 people were aboard City of New York when she left Cape Town, capital of the Union of South Africa, in December 1941. In terms of cargo, the ship carried 6,612 tons of ore, wood, wool, hides and asbestos. The voyage was routine, and due to the war, City of New York hugged the coast of South America as the ship sailed up towards New York.

A few days earlier, the oil tanker Dixie Arrow had been sunk by a German U-boat, U-71, killing 11 of her 33 crew members. U-71 was not alone, plenty of other U-boats had been stalking the east coast of the United States the past few months. One had even sailed into New York Harbor, and papers the next day claimed the submarine's crew had been able to see people dancing on the roof of the Waldorf-Astoria Hotel, a claim that the captain denied.

City of New York was one day away from reaching her namesake port on March 29, 1942. It was Palm Sunday, and most of the passengers had just sat down for dinner. Captain George Sullivan was worried about traveling alone, especially in the dangerous area off of Cape Hatteras, known as Torpedo Junction.

=== Sinking ===
City of New York was not alone in the 24-foot (7.3 m) seas. Another ship, the German U-160, was also in the area and had sunk the Panamanian cargo ship Equipoise only two days earlier, off the coast of Cape Henry, Virginia. U-160 was commanded by Kapitänleutnant Georg Lassen. The U-boat fired one G7a torpedo at City of New York, and it struck the port side just below the bridge 29 seconds after, at 19:36 hours. One of City of New York's five lifeboats was destroyed, and the #3 hold was punctured. The helmsman brought the ship into the wind, moving at her maximum speed of 14 knots (26 km/h; 16 mph), and the order to secure the engines was given to the watch below. The radio operator was given the order to send out both SOS and SSS. The latter was a code devised by the United States Navy to alert other ships that they had been torpedoed.

Sailors of the United States Merchant Marine rushed to the 4-inch gun on the poop deck and opened fire on U-160's periscope, still visible above the choppy seas. Twelve shots were fired at the U-boat, but the submarine disappeared under the water, undamaged. One sailor remarked that the waves were so high that "every time a shell got out there a wave would cover it up and the shell would plow right into it." U-160 went around the stern of City of New York and, about 250 yards (230 m) away from the ship, launched another torpedo as a coup de grâce. This torpedo struck the starboard side of the ship, in the #4 hold, at 19:47 hours.

City of New York began to sink by the stern. The order to abandon ship was given by Captain Sullivan, and passengers of City of New York put on their life vests and hurried up to the boat deck. The destroyed lifeboat flipped over in the waves, and the crew rushed to hook the boat on the poop deck up to davits in its place. As the lifeboats were lowered, passengers reported geysers of water shooting up, nearly the height of the waterline to the deck. The waves made it so several lifeboats were almost swamped, but four of them managed to safely get away. Two life rafts on the deck of City of New York also managed to float free.

As water washed up on the deck, the aft mast began to collapse. People on the overturned lifeboat were almost crushed as the wires attacked to the mast came down with it, but they were saved at the last moment when the wires broke. Waves soon reached the poop deck, and the nine guards abandoned it, jumping into the water and swimming towards the boats. City of New York disappeared beneath the waters. 13 officers, 69 crewmen, and 41 passengers managed to escape: only 123 of the 144 people aboard.

=== Rescue operations ===
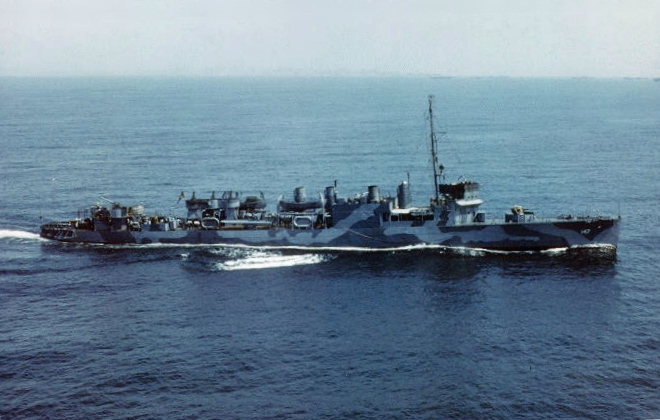
USS Roper, one of the ships that rescued City of New York's survivors

Two United States Army Air Forces (USAAF) bomber aircraft were sent out to investigate, along with a United States Navy (USN) Consolidated PBY Catalina flying boat. They searched the reported area of the sinking but found no survivors. Two USN destroyers, USS Greer and USS Roper came across the ship's two rafts and two of the five lifeboats, picking up 70 survivors. One of them died aboard Roper after being rescued. The same day, 26 other survivors, including Captain Sullivan, were picked up by the ship USS Acushnet. All of the survivors were taken to Norfolk Naval Base at Norfolk, Virginia.

In the morning of April 11, a USAAF bomber spotted the last lifeboat. It had been launched with 13 crew members, one soldier, and six passengers aboard, yet five crewmen, the guard, a man, and two women had died. The USN blimp K-4 directed the United States Coast Guard ship USCGC CG-455 to the lifeboat, and picked up 11 survivors and two bodies. They were taken to Lewes, Delaware.

=== The lifeboat baby ===
One of the passengers in a lifeboat was Desanka Mohorovic, the eight-and-a-half month pregnant wife of an attaché to the Yugoslav consulate in New York. She was traveling with her daughter Vesna, and they made it into a lifeboat together. While in the lifeboat, Mohorovic went into labor. The ship's surgeon, Leonard Conly, thankfully had followed her into the lifeboat, though he had broken two of his ribs doing so, and had forgotten his medical bag. The baby was delivered while the lifeboat was thrown about in 15-foot (4.6 m) waves, with only a piece of canvas separating the doctor and his patient from the rest of the passengers in the lifeboat. They were rescued by USS Roper the next day, and Mohorovic named her child, Jesse Roper Mohorovic, after the vessel that saved them.

== Aftermath ==
There was not much significant news coverage of the sinking of City New York itself beyond local news, as hundreds of ships were sunk by U-boats off North Carolina during the Battle of the Atlantic. The story of the "lifeboat baby" did circulate through the press, and several papers, including the United Press and The New York Times, reported on the story.
