= German submarine U-160 (1941) =

German World War II submarine

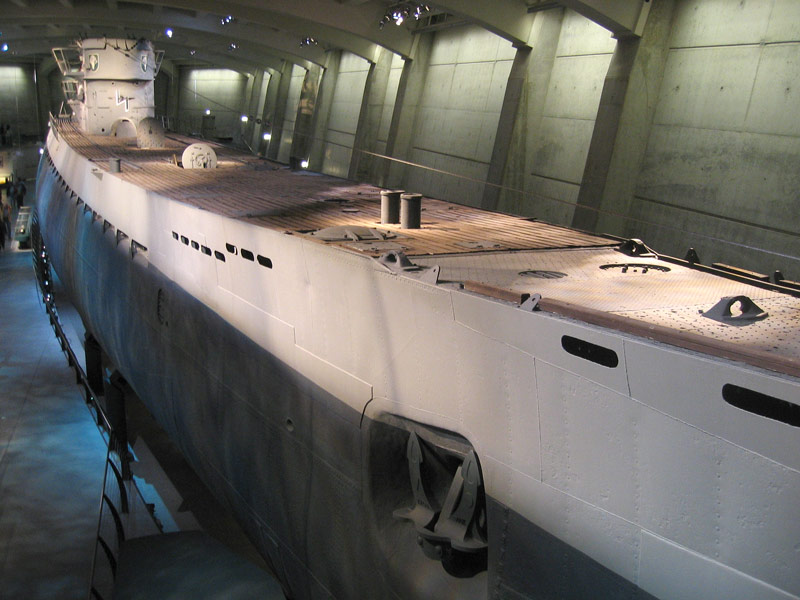
- U-505, a typical Type IXC boat

History

Nazi Germany
- Name: U-160
- Ordered: 23 December 1939
- Builder: DeSchiMAG AG Weser, Bremen
- Yard number: 1010
- Laid down: 21 November 1940
- Launched: 12 July 1941
- Commissioned: 16 October 1941
- Fate: Sunk on 14 July 1943

General characteristics
- Class & type: Type IXC submarine
- Displacement: 1,120 t (1,100 long tons) surfaced; 1,232 t (1,213 long tons) submerged
- Length: 76.76 m (251 ft 10 in) o/a; 58.75 m (192 ft 9 in) pressure hull
- Beam: 6.76 m (22 ft 2 in) o/a; 4.40 m (14 ft 5 in) pressure hull
- Height: 9.60 m (31 ft 6 in)
- Draught: 4.70 m (15 ft 5 in)
- Installed power: 4,400 PS (3,200 kW; 4,300 bhp) (diesels); 1,000 PS (740 kW; 990 shp) (electric)
- Propulsion: 2 shafts; 2 × diesel engines; 2 × electric motors
- Speed: 18.3 knots (33.9 km/h; 21.1 mph) surfaced; 7.3 knots (13.5 km/h; 8.4 mph) submerged
- Range: 13,450 nmi (24,910 km; 15,480 mi) at 10 knots (19 km/h; 12 mph) surfaced; 64 nmi (119 km; 74 mi) at 4 knots (7.4 km/h; 4.6 mph) submerged
- Test depth: 230 m (750 ft)
- Complement: 4 officers, 44 enlisted
- Armament: 6 × torpedo tubes (4 bow, 2 stern); 22 × 53.3 cm (21 in) torpedoes; 1 × 10.5 cm (4.1 in) SK C/32 deck gun (180 rounds); 1 × 3.7 cm (1.5 in) SK C/30 AA gun; 1 × twin 2 cm FlaK 30 AA guns

Service record
- Part of: 4th U-boat Flotilla; 16 October 1941 – 28 February 1942; 10th U-boat Flotilla; 1 March 1942 – 14 July 1943
- Identification codes: M 40 802
- Commanders: Kptlt. Georg Lassen; 16 October 1941 – 14 June 1943; Oblt.z.S. Gerd von Pommer-Esche; 15 June 1943 – 14 July 1943
- Operations: 5 patrols: 1st patrol: 1 March – 28 April 1942; 2nd patrol: 20 June – 24 August 1942; 3rd patrol: 23 September – 9 December 1942; 4th patrol: 6 January – 10 May 1943; 5th patrol: 29 June – 14 July 1943
- Victories: 25 merchant ships sunk (155,352 GRT); 1 auxiliary warship sunk (730 GRT); 5 merchant ships damaged (34,419 GRT)

German submarine U-160 was a Type IXC U-boat of Nazi Germany's Kriegsmarine built for service during World War II. The keel for this boat was laid down on 21 November 1940 at the DeSchiMAG AG Weser yard in Bremen, Germany as yard number 1010. She was launched on 12 July 1941 and commissioned on 16 October under the command of Kapitänleutnant Georg Lassen (Knight's Cross).

The U-boat's service began in training with the 4th U-boat Flotilla. She lost seven men and one was injured in a fire on 14 December 1941 at Danzig (now Gdańsk, Poland). She then moved to the 10th flotilla on 1 March 1942 for operations.

She sank 26 ships, totalling 156,082 gross register tons (GRT) and damaged five more, for 34,419 GRT. She was sunk by American carrier-borne aircraft on 14 July 1943.

== Design ==
German Type IXC submarines were slightly larger than the original Type IXBs. U-160 had a displacement of 1,120 tonnes (1,100 long tons) when at the surface and 1,232 tonnes (1,213 long tons) while submerged. The U-boat had a total length of 76.76 m (251 ft 10 in), a pressure hull length of 58.75 m (192 ft 9 in), a beam of 6.76 m (22 ft 2 in), a height of 9.60 m (31 ft 6 in), and a draught of 4.70 m (15 ft 5 in). The submarine was powered by two MAN M 9 V 40/46 supercharged four-stroke, nine-cylinder diesel engines producing a total of 4,400 metric horsepower (3,240 kW; 4,340 shp) for use while surfaced, two Siemens-Schuckert 2 GU 345/34 double-acting electric motors producing a total of 1,000 metric horsepower (740 kW; 990 shp) for use while submerged. She had two shafts and two 1.92 m (6 ft) propellers. The boat was capable of operating at depths of up to 230 metres (750 ft).

The submarine had a maximum surface speed of 18.3 knots (33.9 km/h; 21.1 mph) and a maximum submerged speed of 7.3 knots (13.5 km/h; 8.4 mph). When submerged, the boat could operate for 63 nautical miles (117 km; 72 mi) at 4 knots (7.4 km/h; 4.6 mph); when surfaced, she could travel 13,450 nautical miles (24,910 km; 15,480 mi) at 10 knots (19 km/h; 12 mph). U-160 was fitted with six 53.3 cm (21 in) torpedo tubes (four fitted at the bow and two at the stern), 22 torpedoes, one 10.5 cm (4.13 in) SK C/32 naval gun, 180 rounds, and a 3.7 cm (1.5 in) SK C/30 as well as a 2 cm (0.79 in) C/30 anti-aircraft gun. The boat had a complement of forty-eight.

== Service history ==
Before starting on her first patrol, U-160 made a brief journey from Wilhelmshaven to Helgoland on 24 February 1942.

=== First and second patrols ===
She departed the German island on 1 March 1942, crossed the North Sea entered the Atlantic Ocean via the Faroe / Shetland gap and headed for the US east coast. Her first victim was Equipoise, sunk on 27 March 1942 60 nautical miles (110 km; 69 mi) southeast of Cape Henry, Virginia. The confusion of the sinking was not helped by there being nationals from at least ten countries among the crew. The boat went on to successfully attack City of New York, Rio Blanco and Ulysses. One ship that did not sink was Bidwell; indeed, she survived the war, not being broken up until 1965.

U-160's second foray saw the boat leave Lorient on 20 June 1942. She crossed the Atlantic again but made for the northern coast of South America. The pickings were just as rich here as they had been further north. Sinking Beaconlight, Carmona and the Treminnard, who were all sailing without an escort, was accomplished within 200 nmi (370 km; 230 mi) of Trinidad. She also damaged Thorshavet, an 11,015 GRT tanker, with torpedo and gun on 4 August 1942. The drifting wreck was subsequently sunk by the Italian submarine Enrico Tazzoli on 6 August. U-160 returned to Lorient on the 24th.

=== Third patrol ===
It was during her third patrol that the boat almost came to grief. She sank HMS Castle Harbour, which was travelling as part of Convoy TRIN-19 from Trinidad at 2120 hours on 16 October 1942. The ship sank within twenty seconds with the loss of nine of her twenty-two crew. U-160 herself was attacked by the escorts of the convoy, but the damage was slight. The submarine returned to her former hunting grounds off South America and sank Gypsum Express and Leda to name but two.

=== Fourth patrol ===
Her fourth sortie was her longest, at 125 days, but also her most successful. Moving into the south Atlantic, she sank SS Roger B. Taney on 8 February. She then attacked and sank Nirpura, Empire Mahseer and Marietta E. east of South Africa. Also lost with Marietta E. were eight landing craft. Other ships were also sunk. When the submariners questioned the survivors of Aelbryn, they misunderstood the ship's name, reporting it as Arian, an American vessel.

=== Fifth patrol and loss ===
By now she was based in Bordeaux, from which she departed on 29 June 1943. She was sunk by TBM Avenger and F4F Wildcat aircraft from the carrier USS Santee south of the Azores on 14 July 1943 with the loss of all 57 on board.

== Summary of raiding history ==
Date	Name	Nationality	Tonnage (GRT)	Fate
27 March 1942	Equipoise	Panama	6,210	Sunk
29 March 1942	City of New York	United States	8,272	Sunk
1 April 1942	Rio Blanco	United Kingdom	4,086	Sunk
6 April 1942	Bidwell	United States	6,837	Damaged
9 April 1942	Malchace	United States	3,516	Sunk
11 April 1942	Ulysses	United Kingdom	14,647	Sunk
16 July 1942	Beaconlight	Panama	6,926	Sunk
18 July 1942	Carmona	Panama	5,496	Sunk
21 July 1942	Donovonia	United Kingdom	8,149	Sunk
25 July 1942	Telamon	Netherlands	2,078	Sunk
29 July 1942	Prescodoc	Canada	1,938	Sunk
2 August 1942	Treminnard	United Kingdom	4,694	Sunk
4 August 1942	Havsten	Norway	6,161	Damaged
16 October 1942	HMS Castle Harbour	Royal Navy	730	Sunk
16 October 1942	Winona	United States	6,197	Damaged
3 November 1942	Chr. J. Kampmann	Canada	2,260	Sunk
3 November 1942	Gypsum Express	United Kingdom	4,034	Sunk
3 November 1942	Leda	Panama	8,546	Sunk
3 November 1942	Thorshavet	Norway	11,015	Sunk
6 November 1942	Arica	United Kingdom	5,431	Sunk
11 November 1942	City of Ripon	United Kingdom	6,368	Sunk
21 November 1942	Bintang	Netherlands	6,481	Sunk
8 February 1943	Roger B. Taney	United States	7,191	Sunk
3 March 1943	Harvey W. Scott	United States	7,176	Sunk
3 March 1943	Nipura	United Kingdom	5,961	Sunk
3 March 1943	Tibia	Netherlands	10,356	Damaged
3 March 1943	Empire Mahseer	United Kingdom	5,087	Sunk
4 March 1943	Marietta E.	United Kingdom	7,628	Sunk
4 March 1943	Sheaf Crown	United Kingdom	4,868	Damaged
8 March 1943	James B. Stephens	United States	7,176	Sunk
11 March 1943	Aelbryn	United Kingdom	4,986	Sunk

== Bibliography ==
- Busch, Rainer; Röll, Hans-Joachim (1999). German U-boat commanders of World War II : a biographical dictionary. Translated by Brooks, Geoffrey. London, Annapolis, Md: Greenhill Books, Naval Institute Press. ISBN 1-55750-186-6.
- Busch, Rainer; Röll, Hans-Joachim (1999). Deutsche U-Boot-Verluste von September 1939 bis Mai 1945 [German U-boat losses from September 1939 to May 1945]. Der U-Boot-Krieg (in German). Vol. IV. Hamburg, Berlin, Bonn: Mittler. ISBN 3-8132-0514-2.
- Gröner, Erich; Jung, Dieter; Maass, Martin (1991). U-boats and Mine Warfare Vessels. German Warships 1815–1945. Vol. 2. Translated by Thomas, Keith; Magowan, Rachel. London: Conway Maritime Press. ISBN 0-85177-593-4.
