= First Happy Time =

Period of German sinking of Allied ships off the East Coast

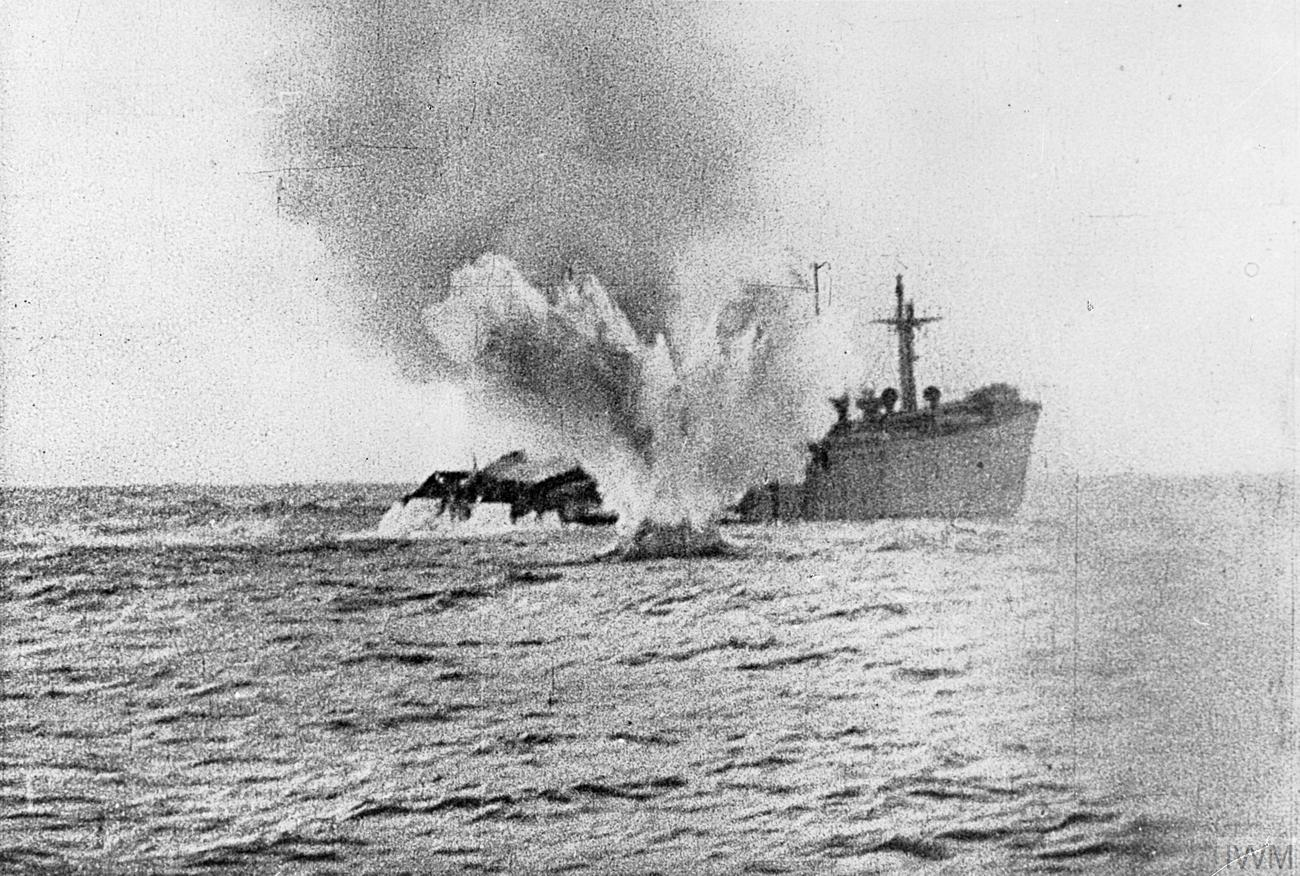
A U-boat shelling a merchant ship which had remained afloat after being torpedoed

The early phase of the Battle of the Atlantic during which Kriegsmarine U-boats enjoyed significant success against Allied warships and merchantmen was referred to by U-boat crews as the Happy Time (German: Die glückliche Zeit), and later the First Happy Time, after a second successful period was encountered.

It started in July 1940, almost immediately after the Fall of France, which brought the German U-boat fleet closer to the British shipping lanes in the Atlantic. From July 1940 to the end of October, 282 Allied ships were sunk off the north-west approaches to Ireland for a loss of 1,489,795 GRT of merchant shipping.

The reason for this successful Axis period was the British lack of radar and their lack of huff-duff-equipped ships which meant that the U-boats were very hard to detect when they made nighttime surface attacks – ASDIC (sonar) could only detect submerged U-boats.

When it ended is a matter of interpretation, with some sources claiming October 1940 and others extending it to April 1941, after the Germans lost three prominent U-boat commanders: Günther Prien, Joachim Schepke, and Otto Kretschmer.

== See also ==
- Operation Berlin
- Convoy SC 7
- Convoy HX 84
- Convoy HX 106
- Convoy HX 112
- Convoy OB 293
- Second Happy Time
