= Underdeck tonnage =

Measure of ship capacity

Underdeck tonnage (UDT) is the measurement, in tons, of the space below a ship's tonnage deck and above its double bottom. In ships with two decks, the tonnage deck is the upper deck; though it is generally the second deck from above in ships with more than two decks. Underdeck tonnage is applied using Simpson's first rule of ship stability. It is measured in gross cubical capacity.
