= German submarine U-71 (1940) =

German World War II submarine

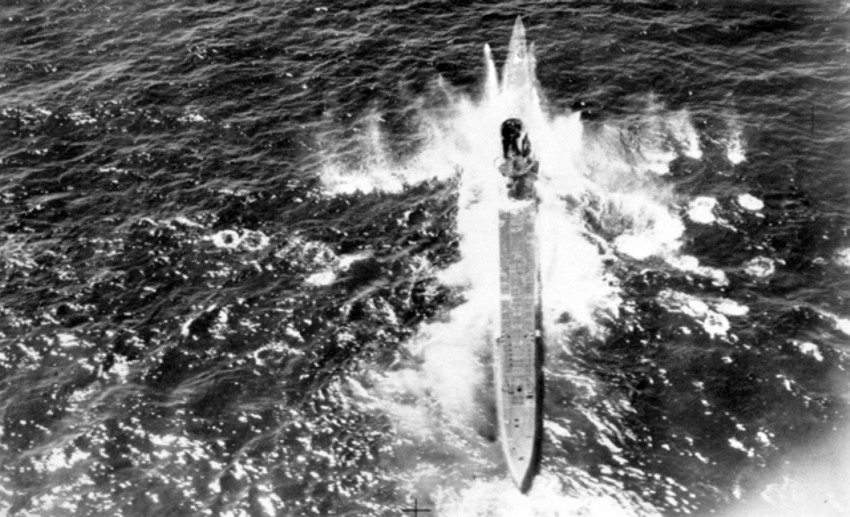
- U-71 under attack on 5 June 1942 from a Sunderland of No. 10 Squadron RAAF

History

Nazi Germany
- Name: U-71
- Ordered: 25 January 1939
- Builder: Germaniawerft, Kiel
- Cost: 4,439,000 Reichsmark
- Yard number: 618
- Laid down: 21 December 1939
- Launched: 31 October 1940
- Commissioned: 14 December 1940
- Fate: Scuttled on 2 May 1945

General characteristics
- Class & type: Type VIIC submarine
- Displacement: 769 tonnes (757 long tons) surfaced; 871 t (857 long tons) submerged
- Length: 67.10 m (220 ft 2 in) o/a; 50.50 m (165 ft 8 in) pressure hull
- Beam: 6.20 m (20 ft 4 in) o/a; 4.70 m (15 ft 5 in) pressure hull
- Height: 9.60 m (31 ft 6 in)
- Draught: 4.74 m (15 ft 7 in)
- Installed power: 2,800–3,200 PS (2,100–2,400 kW; 2,800–3,200 bhp) (diesels); 750 PS (550 kW; 740 shp) (electric)
- Propulsion: 2 shafts; 2 × diesel engines; 2 × electric motors
- Speed: 17.7 knots (32.8 km/h; 20.4 mph) surfaced; 7.6 knots (14.1 km/h; 8.7 mph) submerged
- Range: 8,500 nmi (15,700 km; 9,800 mi) at 10 knots (19 km/h; 12 mph) surfaced; 80 nmi (150 km; 92 mi) at 4 knots (7.4 km/h; 4.6 mph) submerged
- Test depth: 230 m (750 ft); Crush depth: 250–295 m (820–968 ft)
- Complement: 4 officers, 40–56 enlisted
- Armament: 5 × 53.3 cm (21 in) torpedo tubes (four bow, one stern); 14 × torpedoes or 26 TMA mines; 1 × 8.8 cm (3.46 in) deck gun (220 rounds); 1 × 2 cm (0.79 in) C/30 anti-aircraft gun

Service record
- Part of: 7th U-boat Flotilla; 14 December 1940 – 31 May 1943; 24th U-boat Flotilla; 1 June 1943 – 30 June 1944; 22nd U-boat Flotilla; 1 July 1944 – 27 February 1945
- Identification codes: M 26 448
- Commanders: Kptlt. / K.Kapt. Walter Flachsenberg; 14 December 1940 – 3 July 1942; Oblt.z.S. Hardo Rodler von Roithberg; 3 July 1942 – 1 May 1943; Vacant; 2 May – 30 June 1943; Lt.z.S. Erich Krempl; July 1943; Oblt.z.S. Uwe Christiansen; July 1943 – May 1944; Oblt.z.S. Curt Hartmann; May – 7 June 1944; Oblt.z.S. Emil Ranzau; 8 June 1944 – 27 February 1945
- Operations: 10 patrols: 1st patrol: 14 June – 2 July 1941; 2nd patrol: 2 August – 7 September 1941; 3rd patrol: a. 29 September – 31 October 1941; b. 29 November – 5 December 1941; 4th patrol: 18 December – 21 January 1942; 5th patrol: a. 23 February – 20 April 1942; b. 4 – 6 June 1942; 6th patrol: 11 – 20 June 1942; 7th patrol: 4 July – 15 August 1942; 8th patrol: 5 October – 17 November 1942; 9th patrol: 23 December – 12 February 1943; 10th patrol: 27 March – 1 May 1943
- Victories: 5 merchant ships sunk (38,894 GRT)

German submarine U-71 was a type VII C submarine of Nazi Germany's Kriegsmarine during the Second World War.

Ordered on 25 January 1939, her keel was laid down as yard number 618 on 21 December that year. She was launched on 31 October 1940 and commissioned on 14 December. She entered the 7th U-boat Flotilla as a training submarine (commissioning until 31 May 1941), then served as a front (operational) boat between 1 June 1941 and 31 May 1943. During that time she carried out ten war patrols, but had to return to port following damage after colliding with U-631 in the North Atlantic on 17 April 1943.

After that, she moved to the 24th U-boat Flotilla as a training submarine (1 June 1943 – 30 June 1944), then to the 22nd flotilla also as a training boat from 1 July 1944 until 27 February 1945. She was a member of 17 wolfpacks. She sank five ships and was scuttled on 2 May 1945 at Wilhelmshaven, six days before the German surrender.

== Design ==
German Type VIIC submarines were preceded by the shorter Type VIIB submarines. U-71 had a displacement of 769 tonnes (757 long tons) when at the surface and 871 tonnes (857 long tons) while submerged. She had a total length of 67.10 m (220 ft 2 in), a pressure hull length of 50.50 m (165 ft 8 in), a beam of 6.20 m (20 ft 4 in), a height of 9.60 m (31 ft 6 in), and a draught of 4.74 m (15 ft 7 in). The submarine was powered by two Germaniawerft F46 four-stroke, six-cylinder supercharged diesel engines producing a total of 2,800 to 3,200 metric horsepower (2,060 to 2,350 kW; 2,760 to 3,160 shp) for use while surfaced, two AEG GU 460/8–27 double-acting electric motors producing a total of 750 metric horsepower (550 kW; 740 shp) for use while submerged. She had two shafts and two 1.23 m (4 ft) propellers. The boat was capable of operating at depths of up to 230 metres (750 ft).

The submarine had a maximum surface speed of 17.7 knots (32.8 km/h; 20.4 mph) and a maximum submerged speed of 7.6 knots (14.1 km/h; 8.7 mph). When submerged, the boat could operate for 80 nautical miles (150 km; 92 mi) at 4 knots (7.4 km/h; 4.6 mph); when surfaced, she could travel 8,500 nautical miles (15,700 km; 9,800 mi) at 10 knots (19 km/h; 12 mph). U-71 was fitted with five 53.3 cm (21 in) torpedo tubes (four fitted at the bow and one at the stern), fourteen torpedoes, one 8.8 cm (3.46 in) SK C/35 naval gun, 220 rounds, and one 2 cm (0.79 in) C/30 anti-aircraft gun. The boat had a complement of between forty-four and sixty.

== Service history ==
=== First, second, third and fourth patrols ===
U-71's early history was fairly typical of many boats in the U-Boot-Waffe (U-boat arm); she began her operational life in Kiel, but soon moved to St. Nazaire in France, where despite being nearer to the main hunting grounds of the Atlantic, failed to take advantage of her more advanced location. This was between August 1941 and January 1942.

=== Fifth patrol ===
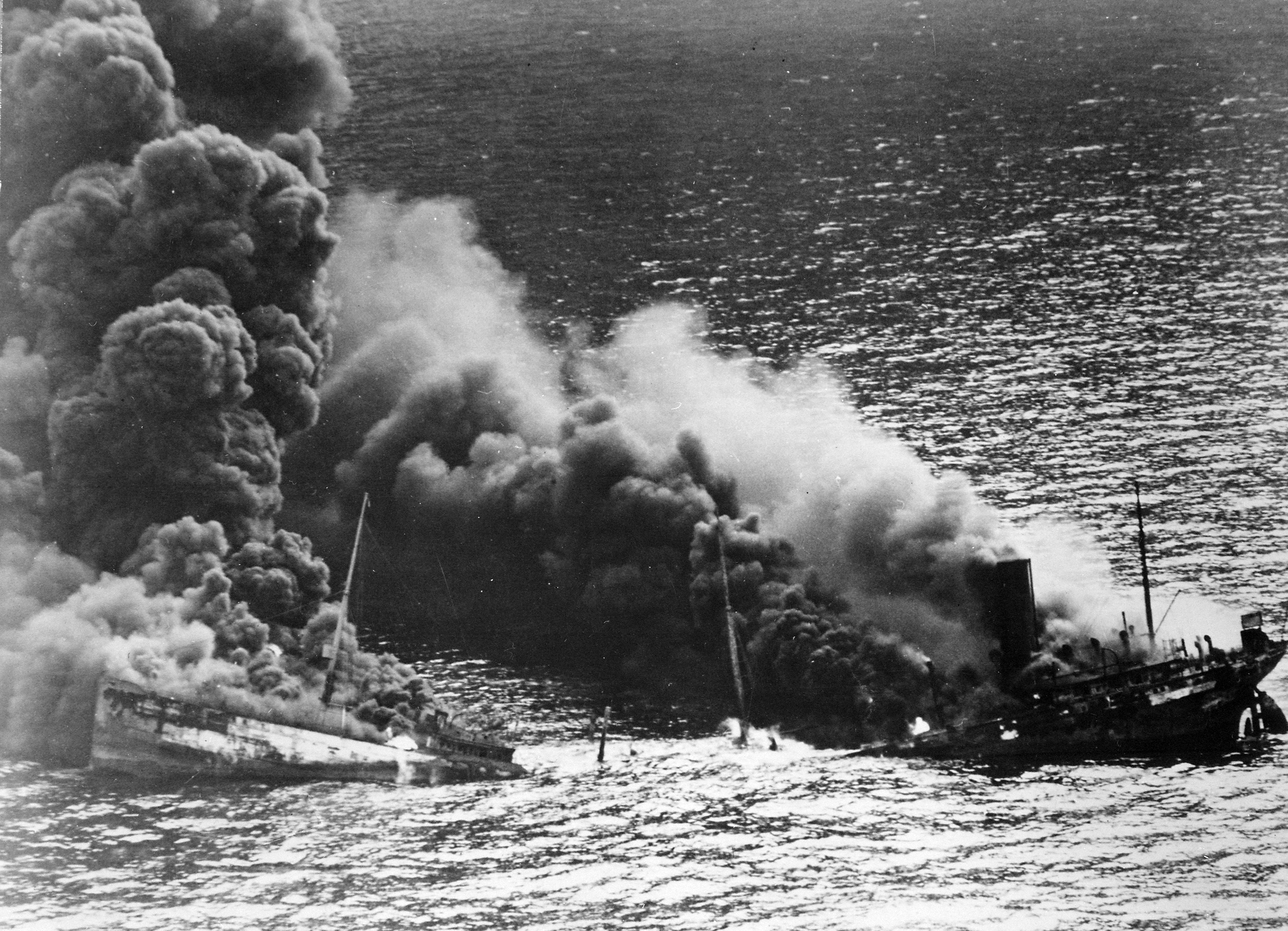
The tanker Dixie Arrow, torpedoed off Cape Hatteras by U-71 on 26 March 1942 during the height of the Second Happy Time.

Her luck and that of her commander, Kapitänleutnant Walter Flachenberg, changed on her fifth foray, sinking a total of 38,894 GRT of shipping in March and April 1942. She returned to France, but this time to La Pallice.

=== Sixth patrol ===
Flachenberg was unable to repeat his success on U-71's sixth and his last patrol, returning to St. Nazaire empty-handed.

=== Seventh, eighth and ninth patrols ===
Under a new skipper, Hardo Rodler von Roithberg, the boat could not reproduce the form of her fifth patrol, despite sortieing three times between July 1942 and February 1943.

=== Tenth patrol ===
By now the writing was on the wall for Germany's U-boats; U-71 was only one submarine that departed La Rochelle and after another unsuccessful voyage, steamed to Königsberg (on the Baltic coast), arriving in May 1943.

=== Wolfpacks ===
U-71 took part in 17 wolfpacks, namely:

- Grönland (10 – 27 August 1941)
- Bosemüller (28 August – 2 September 1941)
- Seewolf (2 – 3 September 1941)
- Breslau (2 – 29 October 1941)
- Seeräuber (21 – 23 December 1941)
- Seydlitz (27 December 1941 – 16 January 1942)
- Endrass (12 – 16 June 1942)
- Wolf (13 – 30 July 1942)
- Pirat (31 July – 3 August 1942)
- Steinbrinck (3 – 7 August 1942)
- Panther (10 – 20 October 1942)
- Veilchen (20 October – 7 November 1942)
- Falke (28 December 1942 – 19 January 1943)
- Landsknecht (19 – 28 January 1943)
- Hartherz (3 – 7 February 1943)
- Adler (7 – 13 April 1943)
- Meise (13 – 17 April 1943)

== Summary of raiding history ==
Date	Ship	Nationality	Tonnage	Fate
17 March 1942	Ranja	Norway	6,355	Sunk
20 March 1942	Oakmar	United States	5,766	Sunk
26 March 1942	Dixie Arrow	United States	8,046	Sunk
31 March 1942	San Gerado	United Kingdom	12,915	Sunk
1 April 1942	Eastmoor	United Kingdom	5,812	Sunk

== Bibliography ==
- Busch, Rainer; Röll, Hans-Joachim (1997). Der U-Boot-Bau auf deutschen Werften. Der U-Boot-Krieg 1939–1945 (in German). Vol. II. Hamburg: Mittler. ISBN 3-8132-0509-6.
- Edwards, Bernard (1996). Dönitz and the Wolf Packs – The U-boats at War. Cassell Military Classics. pp. 75, 85. ISBN 0-304-35203-9.
- Busch, Rainer; Röll, Hans-Joachim (1999). German U-boat commanders of World War II : a biographical dictionary. Translated by Brooks, Geoffrey. London, Annapolis, Md: Greenhill Books, Naval Institute Press. ISBN 1-55750-186-6.
- Busch, Rainer; Röll, Hans-Joachim (1999). Deutsche U-Boot-Verluste von September 1939 bis Mai 1945 [German U-boat losses from September 1939 to May 1945]. Der U-Boot-Krieg (in German). Vol. IV. Hamburg, Berlin, Bonn: Mittler. ISBN 3-8132-0514-2.
- Gröner, Erich; Jung, Dieter; Maass, Martin (1991). German Warships 1815–1945, U-boats and Mine Warfare Vessels. Vol. 2. Translated by Thomas, Keith; Magowan, Rachel. London: Conway Maritime Press. ISBN 0-85177-593-4.
