= SS Dixie Arrow =

American steam oil tanker (1921–1942)

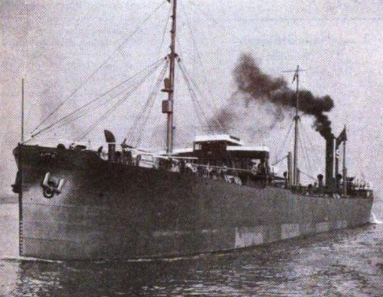
- Dixie Arrow photographed during her sea trials on November 23, 1921

History

United States
- Name: Dixie Arrow
- Namesake: Dixie, nickname for southern US
- Owner: Standard Oil Company of New York (1921–1931); Socony-Vacuum Transportation Co. (1932–1935); Socony-Vacuum Oil Co. (1936–1942)
- Operator: Standard Transportation Company, Inc. (1921–1931); Standard Vacuum Transport Co. (1932–1935); Socony-Vacuum Oil Co. (1936–1942)
- Port of registry: New York, NY
- Route: New York City – Colón – San Francisco – Hong Kong – Manila – New York City (1921–1923); New York City, Boston, Providence – Galveston et al. – Canal Zone – San Francisco, San Diego (1924–1931); Texas City et al. – Paulsboro et al. (1932–1942)
- Ordered: November 1, 1919
- Builder: New York Shipbuilding Corp., Camden
- Yard number: 266
- Laid down: August 11, 1920
- Launched: September 29, 1921
- Sponsored by: Isabelle Brown
- Acquired: November 29, 1921
- In service: 1921–1942
- Identification: USN registry identification number: ID-4789; US official number: 221735; Code letters: MDHC (1921–1933); Call sign: KDVT (1934–1942); Radio call sign: KDVT
- Fate: Torpedoed and sunk off Cape Hatteras on March 26, 1942

General characteristics
- Class & type: Arrow-class steam-powered oil tanker
- Tonnage: 8,046 GRT; 4,960 NRT; 13,400 DWT; 7,834 UDT
- Displacement: 18,277 t
- Length: 468.3 ft (142.7 m)
- Beam: 62.7 ft (19.1 m)
- Draft: 26.0 ft (7.9 m)
- Depth: 72–89 ft (22–27 m)
- Installed power: 3 single-ended Scotch boilers, 9 corrugated furnaces total (3 per boiler); 1 × 4-cylinder quadruple expansion steam engine, 3,200 hp (2,400 kW)
- Propulsion: 1 screw
- Speed: 11 knots (20 km/h; 13 mph)
- Endurance: 46 days; 9,100 miles (14,600 km)
- Capacity: 4,000,000 US gallons (15,000,000 L); 99,742 bbl (15,857.7 m^{3})
- Crew: 62 (maximum); 33 (at time of loss)

SS Dixie Arrow was an American steam-powered oil tanker built in 1920–1921 in Camden, New Jersey, by the New York Shipbuilding Corporation. She was owned by the Standard Oil Company of New York (Socony) and operated through several subsidiaries and successive companies. The tanker was the last member of the Arrow class, a group of twelve oil tankers owned by Socony.

She operated for just over two decades, beginning her service in late November 1921. Dixie Arrow carried petroleum products and vegetable oils from North America to East Asia during her first two years, but East Asia was removed from her route after 1923. Her service was limited by Socony even further, to only the East and Gulf Coasts, in the early 1930s.

The tanker was torpedoed off of Cape Hatteras, North Carolina on the morning of March 26, 1942, by the German submarine U-71. Dixie Arrow sank that evening, with 22 of her 33-man crew surviving. She was one of many ships sunk by U-boats off the Outer Banks during the period that German sailors named "the Second Happy Time".

The wreck of Dixie Arrow is presently a marine habitat that sports an abundance of aquatic life, as well as a popular site for wreck diving. It is registered as a National Historic Place and is a part of the Monitor National Marine Sanctuary.

== Construction ==
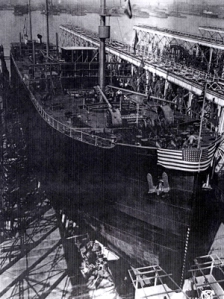

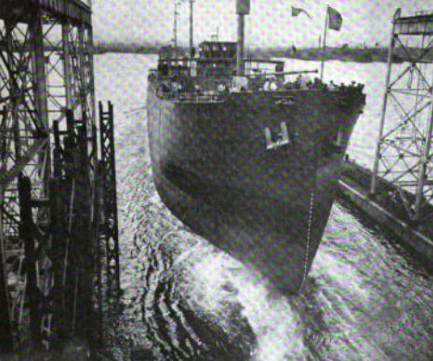
Dixie Arrow shown during her construction (top) in 1920 and her launching (bottom) on September 29, 1921

Dixie Arrow was a member of the Arrow class, a group of oil tankers designed for service in the Far East. The tankers were designed by Nicholas Pluymert, head of Socony's Marine Transportation Department and the company's naval architect. In 1920, Socony was authorized by the United States Shipping Board to construct ten tankers under the Merchant Marine Act of 1920, which allowed shipping operators to offset taxes on profits against building new ships. The construction of four of these tankers, all members of the Arrow class, was assigned to the New York Shipbuilding Corporation of Camden, New Jersey.

The last ship of the class, yard number 266, was ordered on November 1, 1919. Her keel was laid on August 11, 1920, in the South Yard, and she was subsequently given the name Dixie Arrow. The tanker had "a most successful launching" on September 29, 1921. She was sponsored and christened by Isabelle Brown of Dallas, Texas; daughter of E. R. Brown, president of the board of the Magnolia Petroleum Company, which was a subsidiary of Socony.

Dixie Arrow's sea trials were conducted on November 23 and she was delivered to the Standard Transportation Company on November 29. The tanker was assigned the United States Navy (USN) registry identification number ID-4789, the US official number 221735, and the code letters MDHC.

The South Yard, where Dixie Arrow was constructed, had been built for war purposes for a cost of US$10,000,000 at the end of World War I. It was owned by the United States Shipping Board and covered an area of 36.5 acres (14.8 ha). It was located in Gloucester City, a city in Camden County, but bordered the city of Camden where New York Shipbuilding's North Yard was located. The South Yard was closed by the end of November 1921 following the completion of Dixie Arrow and another ship, Lone Star State.

=== Design and specifications ===
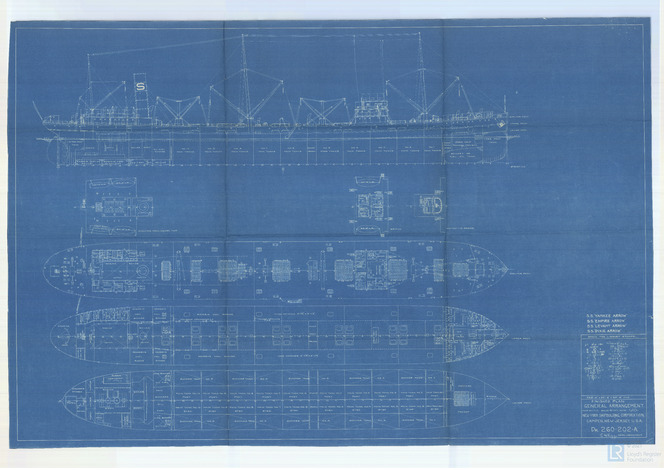
The deck plans for Dixie Arrow

Dixie Arrow was 468.3 feet (142.7 m) long, 62.7 feet (19.1 m) wide, and 26.0 feet (7.9 m) from the waterline to the bottom of the keel. In the aft portion of the bottom deck, the tanker was outfitted with a four-cylinder quadruple expansion steam engine, capable of producing up to 3,200 horsepower (2,400 kW) and fed by three single-ended Scotch marine boilers with three corrugated furnaces on each, nine in total. With a single propeller, she had a maximum speed of 11 knots. Dixie Arrow had a gross register tonnage of 8,046, a net register tonnage of 4,960, a deadweight tonnage of 13,400, and an underdeck tonnage of 7,834. The tanker's displacement was measured at 18,277 tons.

Dixie Arrow boasted three masts, the third of which was shorter than the other two. On the ship's funnel was white "S". The funnel sat atop the aft superstructure. The tanker had room for a maximum of 400,000 US gallons (1,500,000 L) of fuel that would allow her to steam a maximum length of 46 days, or 9,100 miles (14,600 km).

The tanker had ten double cargo holds for bulk oil able to carry roughly 4,000,000 US gallons (15,000,000 L) gallons of commercial oil. A tween deck, designed to carry general cargo, was located between the hold and the main deck, and the space was used significantly during the tanker's service in East Asia. Located on the main deck were five deck cranes, used to transport cargo in and out of the holds. For this purpose, there were eight removable hatches on the main deck. She carried four wooden lifeboats—two on the forward superstructure and two on the aft superstructure—as well as multiple wooden life rafts.

The tanker's forward superstructure was three decks high, and the aft superstructure was one deck high. Amidships, on the starboard side, was a removable accommodation ladder that ran down to the waterline. It was reported that the ship could carry up to 62 crewmen. In a 1921 Lloyd's Register survey, Dixie Arrow was given a rating of 100A1, meaning she was suitable for seagoing service and could carry dry and perishable goods.

Dixie Arrow was fitted with dynamo-driven electric lighting and a radio operating in the wavelength range 300–706 meters (425–1000 kHz). Her radio callsign was KDVT.

=== Ownership ===
Dixie Arrow was built for the Standard Transportation Company, a subsidiary of Socony. Socony had emerged as one of two major companies to rise from the breakup of John D. Rockefeller's Standard Oil, the other being Standard Oil of New Jersey. The two companies would conduct multiple joint ventures before finally merging to form ExxonMobil in 1998.

Lloyd's Register listed Standard Transportation Company as the operator of Dixie Arrow for the first ten years, from 1921 until 1931. Following the merger of Socony and the Vacuum Oil Company in 1931, the tanker's registered operator was the Standard Vacuum Transport Company. The parent company renamed to Socony-Vacuum Oil Company in 1935, and for the remainder of Dixie Arrow's service she was listed as operated by this company. The changes of operator listing did not reflect any actual change of ownership, but only changes of company names and organizations.

== Service history ==
=== Interwar period ===
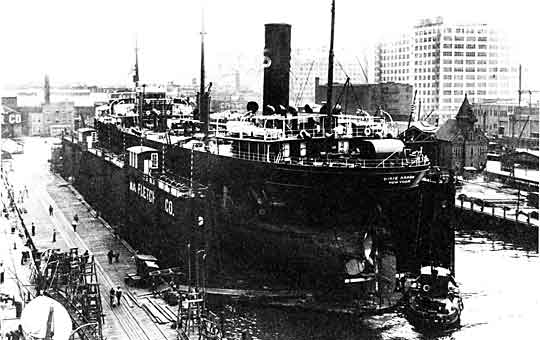
Dixie Arrow at the W. & A. Fletcher Company drydock in New York City, 1922

The first year of Dixie Arrow's service had among her longest trips, going from New York City, through the Panama Canal, and to East Asia. This route was given to all of the Arrow class tankers, and was the service that the tankers were designed for. Dixie Arrow departed for her first voyage in December 1921, carrying 10,000 tons of fuel oil. The tanker departed from New York City, first docking in the Panamanian city of Colón, then in San Francisco, and finally steaming across the Pacific Ocean to the British territory of Hong Kong. After unloading her cargo in the British territory, Dixie Arrow would sail to the US territory of the Philippines to load various vegetable oils in Manila, such as coconut, nut, and what was referred to as China wood oil. These unusual cargos would fill her empty oil tanks before she took the voyage in reverse, returning to New York. Ships traditionally sailed empty on their return trips with only ballast in the hold, though Socony opposed this approach in order to secure higher profits on each transpacific voyage. Each of these voyages took around six months to complete, and served as "a testament to the Arrow [class'] seaworthiness and range."

After three voyages and serving less than two years in East Asia, Dixie Arrow was rerouted to the domestic oil trade in 1923. The tanker's route was changed in order to carry oil back and forth across North America, steaming between the three largest oil-producing and -consuming states: New York, Texas, and California. This change came after oil fields opened up in the area surrounding Los Angeles earlier that same year.

Dixie Arrow would conduct voyages through the Panama Canal to the cities of San Diego, Los Angeles, and San Francisco, steaming from port cities in the northeast such as New York City, Boston, and Providence. While primarily carrying her traditional cargo of petroleum, the tanker also carried general freight, as she was flexible in both her route and cargo type. She possibly carried bunker fuel to the Panama Canal Zone for use by transiting vessels. Dixie Arrow would also make intermediate stops in various Texan ports while on these voyages. Unlike her service in East Asia, Dixie Arrow solely sailed in ballast when on her return voyages to Texas.

In 1931, the tanker's operations were handed over to a subsidiary of the newly formed Socony-Vacuum: Standard Vacuum Transport Company. This subsidiary was a combination of the assets of Standard Transportation Company and Vacuum Oil Company. The amount of oil tankers traveling to California via the Panama Canal had lessened since 1927, with the Californian oil fields becoming insignificant by the early 1930s. Soon afterwards, Socony-Vacuum removed California from the tanker's route. Dixie Arrow was instead rerouted to directly service various Texan ports. The docks that the tanker stopped at while in these ports were operated by one of Socony-Vacuum's affiliates, either the Magnolia Petroleum Company or the Humble Oil and Refinery Company. The ports directly serviced the East Texas Oil Field, which was the largest petroleum reservoir in the state of Texas.

In March 1932, a large storm swept across the East Coast and damaged seven ships steaming off Virginia, including Dixie Arrow, which was the largest vessel reported to have been affected by the storm. Her steering gear broke down and the tanker became unable to maneuver. The US Coast Guard Cutter Mendota soon arrived to assist Dixie Arrow, which was towed to Newport News for repairs by the steamship Argon. The two ships arrived around 4:00 a.m.

=== World War II ===
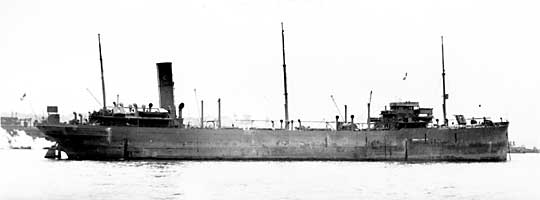
Dixie Arrow at anchor, photographed on February 11, 1942; just over two months before her final voyage

After both the German invasion of Poland in September 1939 and the Japanese bombing of Pearl Harbor in December 1941, Dixie Arrow remained on her regular East Coast route carrying petroleum from Texas to New York. With U-boats sinking American vessels off their own eastern coast, oil refineries began to lose their supply of petroleum, threatening the production of war matériel. The Gulf Coast had a large supply of crude oil, however there were not enough tankers to transport it. As such, Dixie Arrow joined some 200 tankers in the task of fueling American factories in the north. The tanker was not outfitted with weapons or placed in a convoy.

== Final voyage ==
On March 19, 1942, Dixie Arrow left Texas City, Texas, bound for the city of Paulsboro, New Jersey. The tanker was carrying 86,136 barrels (13,694.5 m^{3}) of crude oil, and had a crew numbering 33—eight officers and 25 men—led by Captain Anders Johanson. Dixie Arrow was not travelling in a convoy. The Coastal Convoy System used by the USN was established in the summer of 1942, nearly three months after Dixie Arrow had sunk. The captain had ordered the ship's lights to be turned off at night.

Dixie Arrow was under instructions to follow the forty-fathom (240 ft; 73 m) contour past the dangerous shoals off Cape Hatteras, and there was also reportedly a minefield in the area, laid by the USN. Captain Johanson attempted unsuccessfully to obtain details of this from nearby USN patrol vessels.

While steaming past the Outer Banks of North Carolina, Dixie Arrow's crew could see columns of smoke coming from oil fires located south of Morehead City, the result of other ships that had fallen victim to U-boats. Ships traditionally sailed along warm water currents for speed, namely the Gulf Stream. Both the Gulf Stream and the Labrador Current meet off the coast of North Carolina. All shipping in the area was either coming from the north or the south, making the region a prime hunting ground for U-boats. In addition, the continental shelf is narrowest along Hatteras Island, making it convenient for U-boats to hide themselves in deep water while waiting for ships. Just under 400 Allied ships would be sunk by German U-boats off of the coastline of North Carolina by the end of their campaign, officially named Operation Paukenschlag (English: Operation Drumbeat). The operation itself was part of the much larger Battle of the Atlantic. Operation Drumbeat would become nicknamed the "Second Happy Time" by Germans sailors due to the high amount of shipping losses suffered by the Allied powers, and the Americans gave the waters off North Carolina the nickname "Torpedo Alley".

=== Attack ===
Roughly 10 minutes before 09:00 AM EWT (Eastern War Time), in the morning hours of March 26, 1942, Dixie Arrow made her way into Cape Hatteras' infamous Diamond Shoals. The tanker was reported to be zig-zagging with 45° tacks, altering her course every 6–9 minutes, and was steaming at a speed of 10.5 knots. Shortly before 9:00 am, a United States Coast Guard (USCG) airplane reported that it was circling Dixie Arrow near the Diamond Shoals outer buoy. The tanker was steaming through clear and calm seas with a gentle breeze.

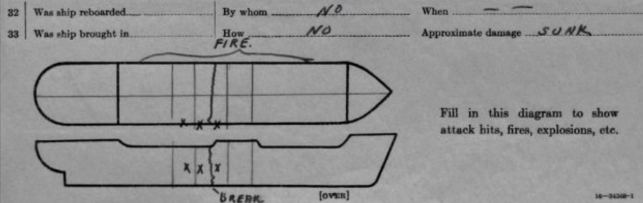
A diagram showing the locations of both the torpedo strikes and where Dixie Arrow broke in two

Twelve miles (19 km) southwest of Cape Hatteras, the type VIIC submarine U-71 was on its fifth patrol, now under the command of Kapitänleutnant Walter Flachsenberg. The U-boat had had a successful patrol thus far, having sunk both the Norwegian tanker MT Ranja and the American cargo ship SS Oakmar mere days earlier. Having spotted nothing but small fishing boats the night of March 25–26, the submarine had been preparing "to dive and sleep for the day when [the] lookout spotted some masts on the southern horizon." The masts that had been spotted belonged to Dixie Arrow. Preparing to sink the newly spotted vessel, U-71 disappeared beneath the water and began to maneuver itself in-between the shoreline and the tanker. At 8:58 AM, Kapitanleutnant Flachsenberg gave the order to fire three torpedoes, (Note: Some sources, including U-71's official log, state that only two torpedoes were fired.) all of which hit the tanker on the starboard side, amidships.

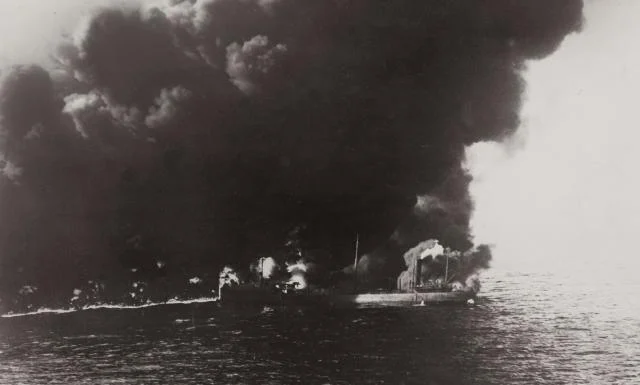
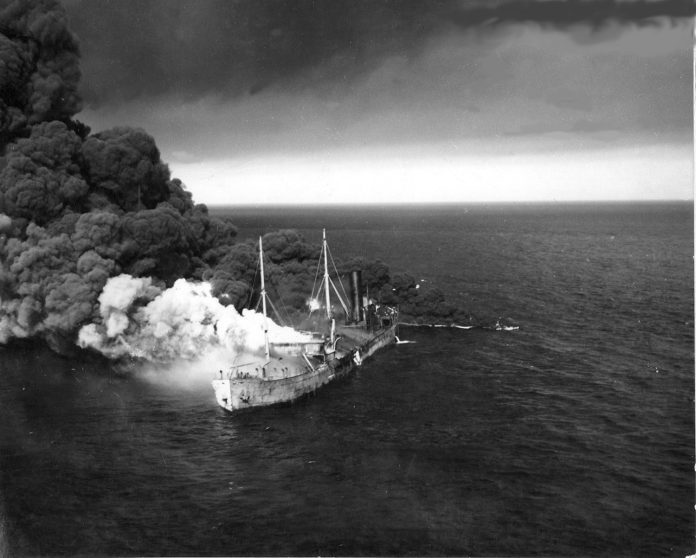
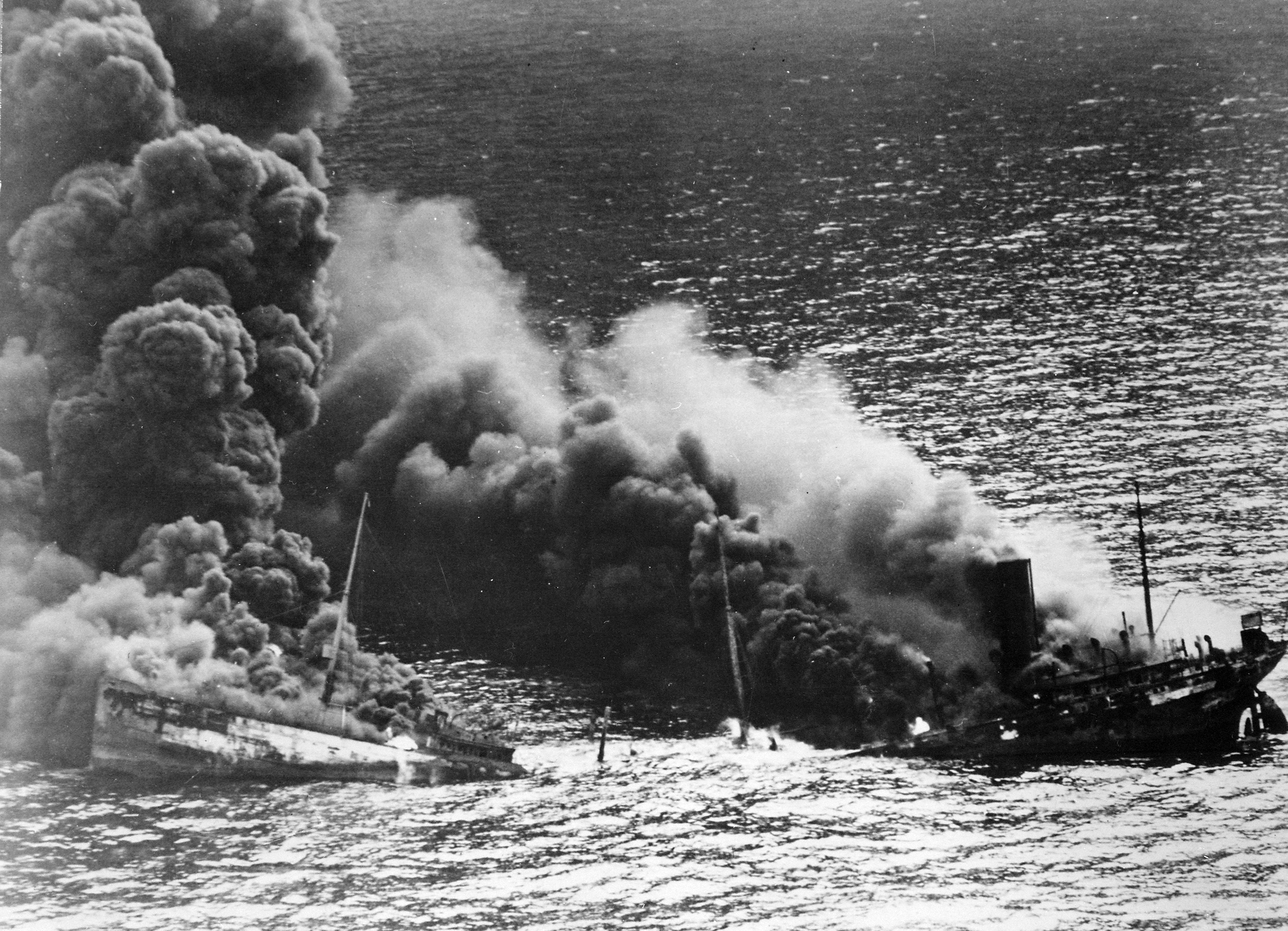
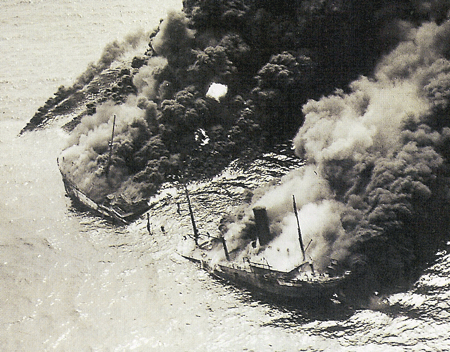

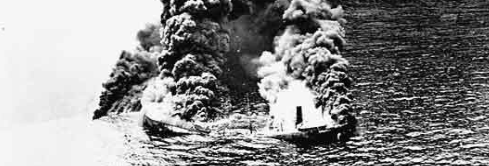
A compilation of photographs taken by the USCG airplane that circled Dixie Arrow as she sank. They are shown in what is assumed to be chronological order.

The torpedoes were spotted by the able seaman on the bridge, Oscar Chappell, (Note: Spelled as "Chappel" in some sources) and he attempted to turn Dixie Arrow out of the way of the torpedoes. However, it was too late. The first torpedo blew up the deckhouse and lit its ruins on fire, killing the radio operator, all the tanker's officers, and a number of crewmen on the bridge—save for Chappell. The other two torpedoes hit the tanker roughly sixty seconds later, the second hitting between the midships mast and funnel, and the third hitting just aft of the deckhouse.

The blasts wounded eight men in the dining hall and knocked out the lights in the engine room. Captain Johanson had stepped out of his cabin after the first two torpedoes had hit the ship, but was killed when the third torpedo struck. The engines were stopped by the first assistant engineer just before the third blast. Around this time, the pilot of the USCG airplane took multiple photographs of Dixie Arrow after reporting at 9:04 AM that the tanker was on fire.

Despite the fact that her engines had been stopped, Dixie Arrow continued moving forward in the water due to her momentum. Chappell turned the tanker to starboard, bringing her into the wind to keep seven men trapped on the bow from being burnt to death and allowing them time to jump into the water to reach relative safety. However, in doing this, the wind blew the flames onto the bridge and he was killed. A surviving crewman recalled that "fire was shooting up all about [Chappell]" as he turned the wheel. The able seaman was posthumously awarded the Distinguished Merchant Marine Medal for his actions.

A massive explosion tore through Dixie Arrow's midships section, creating a mushroom cloud of smoke and fire that was reportedly visible for several miles all around. The tanker's starboard side became completely engulfed by fire and U-71's crew soon became unable to see Dixie Arrow. The flaming oil spread all around the tanker, making it dangerous for her crew to jump overboard as they could be burnt to death or get stuck underneath the oil. Two of Dixie Arrow's lifeboats were destroyed in the flames, and a third swung uncontrollably on its davits and ended up swinging off of them, launching one crewman into the flames and to his death. The tanker's fourth lifeboat managed to launch due to the efforts of six crewmen, with eight others aboard it.

The six crewmen that helped launch the lifeboat then jumped into the water and managed to find a wooden life raft. It was quickly abandoned by five of the men upon realizing the raft had no oars, but the sixth stayed aboard. Those in the lifeboat attempted to encourage the man to jump into the water, though he replied that he didn't know how to swim. He was killed when the raft drifted into a patch of flaming oil. Two crewmen on the bow jumped into the water despite not knowing how to swim, and both were eventually rescued after swimming through oil-covered water. Dixie Arrow began to buckle amidships, listing to starboard, as the lifeboat pulled away and the crew in the water swam for their lives.

As the tanker's sole radio operator was killed in the initial explosion, no distress call had ever been sent out to alert nearby ships of Dixie Arrow's condition. Despite this, Naval Operating Base Norfolk reported that the tanker was burning two miles south of the Diamond Shoals Light Buoy at 9:26 AM. The lack of a rescue signal may not have had much effect in any case, as ships steaming up and down the East Coast seldom stopped to assist the survivors of torpedoed vessels, for fear of also being targeted.

=== Rescue operations ===
The USN destroyer USS Tarbell spotted the mushroom cloud set off by Dixie Arrow, and the tanker's came at full speed in order to investigate. Guided by a seaplane, the destroyer arrived at 9:30 AM, roughly half an hour after Dixie Arrow had first been torpedoed. After the seaplane dropped two bombs on the U-boat, the destroyer dropped several depth charges, which did nothing to harm the submarine, though it reportedly "shook from end to end, bracketed by Tarbell's depth charges." A crewman of Dixie Arrow reported that he "felt like somebody had kicked him in the stomach" after the first depth charges exploded. Upon noticing the people in the water, the destroyer's crew ceased the deployment of depth charges and hung cargo nets off her gunwales for the surviving crewmen to climb aboard. She picked up eight men in the lifeboat and 14 others in the water, and rescued a total of 22 survivors out of the tanker's 33 crew.

The anti-submarine patrol ship USCGC Dione also travelled several miles to assist, unaware that Tarbell was already present. The cutter arrived after the destroyer had departed, her crew finding only wreckage and bodies.

=== Aftermath ===
The tanker drifted north, and she was last spotted around 11:40 AM by USN personnel. By nighttime, Dixie Arrow had drifted inshore to the Cape Hatteras minefields, where she would finally sink. There, her frame gave in and broke in two. The tanker's bow disappeared underwater, the superstructure catching on the stern and dragging it down as well. The fires that had once engulfed the tanker were subsequently extinguished by the seawater. As she settled, Dixie Arrow may have detonated a mine that had been laid by the USN in an attempt to deter U-boats. USCGC Orchid—a buoy tender—was sent to the wrecksite, where she placed a red nun buoy to warn passing vessels of the underwater tanker. Only the masts of Dixie Arrow stuck out of the water.

While USS Tarbell had initially taken the 22 survivors of Dixie Arrow to Morehead City, North Carolina, they were later transferred to Norfolk, Virginia. The less injured among the survivors were taken to the city's Monticello Hotel. While there, they were met by several men in dark suits whom the seamen suspected to be from the FBI. The men kept the survivors confined for two days and interviewed them before they were allowed to take a train to New York. The men "wanted to know the particulars, how [the crew] happened to take this particular ship and so on." Dixie Arrow's survivors speculated that the FBI thought that there was a traitor among the crew who had shared secret information, such as Dixie Arrow's location, so that U-71 could sink her.

The liberty ship hull number 1262 was named SS Oscar Chappell after the tanker's able seaman, and was christened by his wife during the ship's launching in 1934. In 2000, the Able Seaman Oscar Chappell Award For Outstanding Maritime Stewardship was created in his honor, awarded to a civil service crewmember of Military Sealift Command who displays "selfless dedication to shipmates."

U-71 moved to full power and escaped after Tarbell departed, returning to La Pallice, France, on April 20. The type VII-C submarine sank only two other Allied ships over the course of the war. U-71 was decommissioned and then scuttled on May 2, 1945, in Wilhelmshaven, Germany; six days before the German Instrument of Surrender was issued.

== Wreck ==
- DIXIE ARROW (shipwreck and remains)
- U.S. National Register of Historic Places
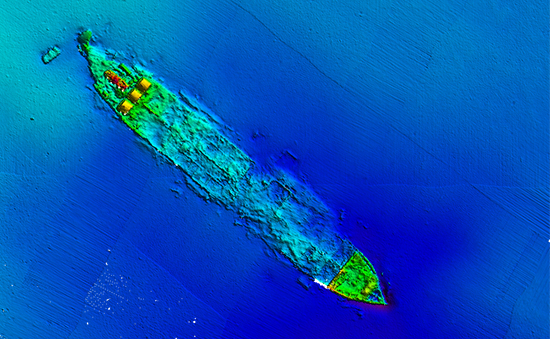
- A multibeam scan of Dixie Arrow's wrecksite

- Location within North Carolina
- Location: Offshore Dare County, North Carolina
- Nearest city: Ocracoke, North Carolina
- Coordinates: 34°54′1″N 75°45′2″W
- Area: 61.8 acres (25.0 ha)
- Built: 1920–1921
- Built by: New York Shipbuilding Corp., Camden
- Architect: Nicholas Pluymert
- MPS: World War II Shipwrecks along the East Coast and Gulf of Mexico
- NRHP reference No.: 13000781

Significant dates
- Completed: 1921
- Sunk: 1942
- Added to NRHP: September 25, 2013

The shipwreck was used as target practice by planes from the Cherry Point North Carolina Marine Air Station all through 1942, and her masts collapsed into the sea in 1943. Dixie Arrow's bell was recovered in 1944 by the USN during a dive to the wreck. The bell was later presented to designer Nicholas Pluymert, who dedicated it to Oscar Chappell. After this, the remainder of the tanker's wreck was then wire-dragged to a depth of 43 feet (13 m) to ensure that Dixie Arrow would not be a hazard for navigation.

=== Present day ===
Dixie Arrow currently lays on a flat sand plain, roughly 15 miles (24 km) south of Hatteras Inlet, at the coordinates 34°54'1"N, 75°45'2"W, at a depth of 90 feet (27 m). The bow and the stern sit upright, close together and aligned. Both the bow and stern portions of the wreck are in good condition, with much of the machinery in those parts still in its original positions. The stem rises 30 feet (9.1 m) above the sand, and the boilers and engine are the most prominent features of the stern section. Amidships, however, Dixie Arrow's remains appear to have fallen down, leaving it as an unrecognizable mess of machinery, parts, and metal.

A wide array of wildlife inhabit the wreck, which has become an important part of the local marine ecosystem. Organisms often encountered around Dixie Arrow's wreck include barracudas, sand tiger sharks, southern stingrays, loggerhead seaturtles, and various other species of fish. Coral has also grown on the tanker's metal surfaces. Because of this, the wreck has become a popular diving site for marine biologists and civilian wreck divers, and the region is also visited by charter fishing boats. Tanker wrecks have given rise to concerns about potential environmental damage, but Dixie Arrow's cargo tanks are reportedly empty, and there is "no presence of oil on or within the shipwreck."

Hurricane Isabel, a category 5 Atlantic hurricane came through the Outer Banks in 2003. Despite damaging thousands of houses and washing out a portion of Hatteras Island, Hurricane Isabel was not reported to have caused damage to Dixie Arrow. The storm swept up several feet of sand at the wrecksite, allowing divers to see portions of the tanker that had not been visible before the hurricane. In May 2019, it was reported that a fishing net had gotten stuck on the wreck. It was soon removed by locals without damage to Dixie Arrow or wildlife.

On September 25, 2013, Dixie Arrow's shipwreck and the surrounding 61.7 acres of seabed were labeled as a National Historic Place by the United States government. The wrecksite was also labeled as part of the National Oceanic Atmospheric Administration's Monitor National Marine Sanctuary in 2016, placing it under maritime protection per federal law. It was reported the change would not affect civilian wreck diving expeditions or charter fishing that commonly occurred at the site.

== See also ==
- Battle of the Atlantic – the larger conflict that the Second Happy Time was a part of
- SS India Arrow – one of Dixie Arrow's sister ships, sunk during the Second Happy Time
- U-123 – the most successful U-boat of the Second Happy Time
- United States Merchant Marine – the American merchant shipping fleet in World War II
