= SS Eastmoor =

British merchant ship (1922–1942)

- SS Eastmoor sometime during her service

History
- Name: Eastmoor
- Owner: Walter Runciman Company Ltd.
- Operator: Moor Line
- Ordered: 1 December 1920
- Builder: Northumberland Shipbuilding Company
- Yard number: 260
- Launched: 30 March 1922
- Completed: June 1922
- In service: 1922
- Out of service: 1942
- Identification: Call sign: GJMT; Official number: 146582
- Fate: Sunk, 31 March 1942

General characteristics
- Type: Cargo ship
- Tonnage: 5,812 GRT; 3,667 NRT; 9,195 DWT
- Length: 399.8 ft (121.9 m)
- Beam: 52.9 ft (16.1 m)
- Depth: 32.8 ft (10.0 m)
- Installed power: 1 × triple-expansion steam engine; 3 single boilers with 9 total corrugated furnaces; 8,474 hp (6,319 kW)
- Propulsion: 1 × screw
- Speed: 10 knots (19 km/h; 12 mph)

SS Eastmoor was a British merchant ship built in 1922 for the Moor Line. She was sunk on 1 April 1942, by the German submarine U-71.

== Construction ==
Eastmoor was ordered on 1 December 1920. She was built in the Howdon yard of the Northumberland Shipbuilding Company in Newcastle, as yard number 260. She was launched on 30 March 1922, and was completed in June that same year. She was assigned the official number 146582 and the call sign GJMT.

=== Specifications ===
Eastmoor had a length of 399.8 feet (121.9 m), a width of 52.9 feet (16.1 m), and a depth of 32.8 feet (10.0 m). The ship was 5,812 gross register tons (GRT), 3,667 net register tons (NRT), and 9,195 tons deadweight (DWT). She had one triple-expansion steam engine with three single boilers with nine total corrugated furnaces, capable of producing 8,478 horsepower (6,322 kW). She had one propeller and could go a maximum speed of 10 knots (19 km/h; 12 mph).

== Service history ==
Eastmoor was operated by the Moor Line, a subsidiary of Walter Runciman Company Limited. Between December 1928 and 1936, she called in twice in Auckland, New Zealand. She called in to Jamaica in 1934 while en route from Liverpool to Vancouver, via the Panama Canal. In December 1937, the ship docked in Galveston, Texas, while bound for Fremantle, Australia. Eastmoor carried a wide variety of cargo, including sulfur, grains, and lumber.

=== World War II ===
On 4 July 1940, the ship was damaged by an attack by German aircraft while in the English Channel, 12 miles (19 km) south of Portland Bill. She was repaired at Cardiff, and repairs were completed by 8 August. On 11 December 1941, Eastmoor sailed out of New York. She arrived at Glasgow on 10 January 1942. She left Glasgow for Jacksonville, Florida on 14 February, arriving in Florida on 16 March. She then sailed for Savannah, Georgia, on 21 March and arrived the following day.

== Sinking ==
Eastmoor departed Savannah on 27 March 1942, bound for Halifax, Nova Scotia, and then the United Kingdom. She carried 7,500 tons of general cargo and was under the command of Captain James Basil Rodgers. She carried 52 people—42 officers and crewmen, as well as 10 armed guards from the United States Navy or Army.

On 31 March, around 7:30 PM EWT, Eastmoor was spotted by the German submarine U-71 about 500 nautical miles (930 km; 580 mi) off the coast of Hampton Roads, Virginia. The submarine fired two torpedoes at 8:01 and 8:31 PM, both of which failed to strike the ship. A third torpedo was fired at 9:03, this one striking in the aft portion of the ship.

Eastmoor sank within 12 minutes, at 9:15 PM. It is unknown if any of the ship's lifeboats were launched. 16 men, including Captain Rodgers, 12 crewmen, and 3 gunners, perished. The 36 survivors found their way into a lifeboat or life rafts and floated together for the next three days. On 3 April, they were rescued by one of two British ships: Calgary or Rookley, and taken to Cape Town in May.
