= SS Oakmar =

American merchant ship (1920–1942)

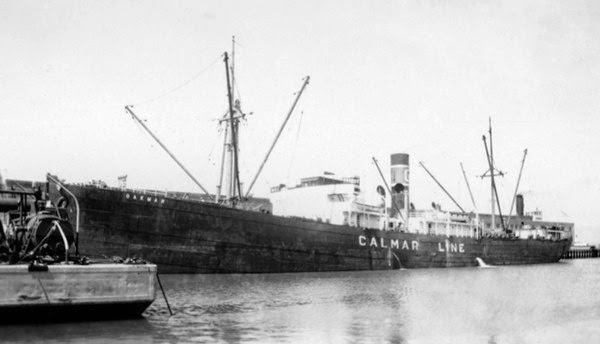
- Oakmar in service with the Calmar Steamship Company

History
- Name: Eastern Exporter (1920–1923); William Campion (1923–1927); Oakmar (1927–1942)
- Owner: United States Shipping Board (1920–1923); Garland Steamship Corporation (1923–1927); Calmar Steamship Company (1927–1942)
- Ordered: January 1, 1919
- Builder: Mitsui Buttan K. K.
- Completed: July 1920
- In service: 1920
- Out of service: 1942
- Identification: Official number: 220362; EFC number: 2029; Code letters: KDAZ
- Fate: Sunk on March 20, 1942

General characteristics
- Type: Cargo ship
- Tonnage: 5,766 GRT; 5,766 DWT
- Length: 385 ft (117 m)
- Beam: 51 ft (16 m)
- Depth: 34 ft (10 m)
- Installed power: triple-expansion steam engine, 554 nhp
- Speed: 11.5 knots (21.3 km/h; 13.2 mph)

SS Oakmar was an American steam-powered cargo ship built in 1920 as Eastern Exporter for the United States Shipping Board (USSB). She was renamed William Campion after being bought by the Garland Steamship Corporation in 1923 and then Oakmar after being bought by the Calmar Steamship Company in 1927. She was sunk off the coast of North Carolina in World War II on March 20, 1942, by the German submarine U-71.

== Construction ==
Eastern Exporter cost, alongside four other ships following the 'Eastern X' naming convention, a total of $338,094. She was built by Mitsui Buttan K. K. in Tama, Tokyo as yard number 33. She was ordered on January 1, 1919, and was completed sometime during July 1920. Her official number was 220362, her Emergency Fleet Corporation number was 2029, and the code letters KDAZ.

=== Specifications ===
Eastern Exporter was 385 feet (117 m) long, 51 feet (16 m) wide, and 34 feet (10 m) deep. She had a gross register tonnage of 5,766 and a deadweight tonnage of 5,766. Her triple-expansion steam engine developed a net horsepower of 554, and the ship could travel at a maximum speed of 11.5 knots (21.3 km/h; 13.2 mph).

== Service ==
Eastern Exporter traveled from Calcutta, India, refueling in both Cape Town, South Africa, and Port of Spain, Trinidad before finally continuing on to Boston, Massachusetts. She normally carried a cargo consisting of manganese ore, burlap, and rubber.

=== Ownership ===
Following her construction, Eastern Exporter was delivered to the USSB. In 1923, the ship was sold by the USSB to the Garland Steamship Corporation of New York and renamed William Campion. Just four years later, in March 1927, she was purchased by the Calmar Steamship Company—a subsidiary of Bethlehem Steel—and renamed Oakmar.

== Sinking ==
Oakmar departed Port of Spain in early 1942, bound for Boston. She had a crew of 36 men under the command of Captain Nolan Fleming. In addition, a single passenger bound from India to the United States was aboard. The ship evaded four U-boats while crossing the Atlantic, each time travelling at full speed a sub got near her.

On March 20, Oakmar was 310 nautical miles (570 km; 360 mi) northwest of Bermuda and 300 nmi (560 km; 350 mi) southeast of Nantucket. She was travelling at top speed, passing by Cape Hatteras around 2:00 PM. The seas were heavy, and a gale of 35–40 knots (65–74 km/h; 40–46 mph) came from the northwest. The German submarine U-71 suddenly surfaced, commanded by Kapitänleutnant Walter Flachsenberg. Due to the heavy seas, Flachsenberg did not want to conduct a torpedo attack. Instead, U-71 surfaced and began to follow Oakmar. Her radio operator sent out an SSSS signal at 2:49 PM. It was reported that the ship was being pursued by a German submarine, and the signal was received by the Fifth Naval District Headquarters.

U-71 suddenly opened fire on Oakmar with a machine gun located on its conning tower. Bullets struck Oakmar's bridge and superstructure, despite her having turned to port in an attempt to avoid the submarine. Captain Fleming assumed the gunfire was the submarine firing warning shots, and ordered her stopped as he dumped confidential papers overboard in a weighted bag.

Oakmar's starboard lifeboat managed to get away with 30 men aboard, including the ship's passenger. The side of the lifeboat was smashed while lowering. Two men leapt from the deck of the ship into the water, but the lifeboat was unable to rescue them due to the heavy seas. Captain Fleming and three other men were seen launching the port lifeboat, and those in the starboard one noted that "Oakmar was bobbing like a cork" while U-71 remained stationary in the water.

More shells were fired at Oakmar, some 30 or 40 shells fired in a time period of just 15 minutes. U-71 eventually fired a torpedo at the sinking ship, somehow missing her entirely. A second torpedo was fired, this one striking just forward of the bridge. Oakmar sank by the bow in a matter of minutes at 2:55 PM. Captain Fleming and the remaining crew presumably went down with the ship, as the port lifeboat was never seen in the water. U-71 submerged and eventually departed from the scene, not once interacting with the men in the starboard lifeboat.

The lifeboat drifted for two days among the waves, before it was eventually spotted by the Greek steamer Stravos around 8:00 PM on March 22. The survivors of Oakmar arrived at Bermuda on March 24 at 5:00 PM, where one of them were hospitalized. The remainder were flown to La Guardia Airport in New York City aboard a Pan American Clipper aircraft, arriving on April 1.
