= Sinking of U-352 =

1942 naval action of World War II

- Part of the Second Happy Time of World War II
- An illustration of the action between Icarus and U-352 published in Life on 14 December 1942.
Date	9 May 1942
Location	Off Cape Lookout, North Carolina
Result	American victory

Belligerents
United States	Germany

Commanders and leaders
(United States) Edward D. Howard (United States) Maurice D. Jester	Hellmut Rathke

Units involved
USCGC Icarus	German submarine U-352

Casualties and losses
None	1 U-boat; 15 crew

The sinking of U-352 was a naval action of the Second Happy Time. In the afternoon of 9 May 1942, USCGC Icarus sank the German submarine U-352 off the Outer Banks of North Carolina. The U-boat had attempted to sink Icarus with a torpedo, but the shallow water meant the torpedo struck the seabed. 14 of the U-boat's 48-man crew were killed during the action, and 34 were initially taken as prisoners with one dying of his injuries. The 33 prisoners were interrogated and then sent to prisoner-of-war camps.

German U-boats had been operating off the Atlantic coast of the United States since January 1942, as part of Operation Drumbeat. Initial German attacks in January and February 1942 proved successful, leading the Germans to assign more U-boats to the crucial shipping lanes off the American coast. This period became known as the Second Happy Time by German commanders. U-85 had been sunk by USS Roper on 15 April, marking the first time an enemy submarine was sunk in American waters.

U-352 was on its first patrol off the American coast. It had attempted to sink a Swedish freighter, firing four torpedoes on 5 and 6 May, but missed all its shots. U-352 was located by a sonar contact on 9 May. After firing the torpedo, the U-boat hid in its debris cloud to escape Icarus. Depth charges launched by the cutter damaged it and forced it to surface. Icarus' crew killed several members of the U-boat's crew who were attempting to man its deck gun.

33 members of the U-boat's crew were taken as prisoners and 15 died, one of his wounds aboard Icarus. They were the first enemy prisoners of war in the United States since the War of 1812. For his actions, the commanding officer of the cutter was awarded the Navy Cross and was promoted to lieutenant commander.

== Background ==
Operation Drumbeat was the German plan to attack Allied shipping along the East Coast of the United States. German commanders hoped that sinking Allied ships in their own waters would either reduce the war efforts of the United States and United Kingdom or knock them out of the war completely. Five U-boats were sent out in the first wave at the beginning of 1942. The Germans were astonished by their initial success, with 23 Allied ships sunk in January and February. In response to these successes, eight more U-boats were sent out to the American coast. The early months of 1942 became known to German commanders as the Second Happy Time.

Roper's crew pulls up a dead U-85 crewman; the action marked the first time an enemy submarine was sunk in American waters.

The waters off North Carolina were given the nickname "Torpedo Alley" due to the high number of Allied merchant ships sunk by U-boats there during the Second Happy Time. The region was a common shipping lane, and vessels often passed through without following a zig-zagging pattern—which would make it harder for U-boats to hit them—and with their lights on. While there were naval patrol vessels in the region, they were few in number and slow, unseaworthy, or largely inappropriate for anti-submarine efforts. Despite this, on 14 April 1942, an engagement between the American destroyer USS Roper and German submarine U-85 ended in the first sinking of an enemy submarine by American naval forces in their home waters. However, all crewmen aboard U-85 were killed and the U-boat's Enigma machine was not recovered. The Navy was unable to acquire any intelligence from U-85 as a result. The ship that traditionally patrolled off the North Carolinian coast was Icarus' sister ship, Dione, but she was called to Little Creek for repairs and rearmament on 29 April. As such, Icarus took her place. Dione had been at the job since January, and she was the only designated anti-submarine warfare ship.

U-352 was a type VIIC U-boat. The type VII U-boats, of which the type VIIC was a derivative, were capable of traveling long distances and were thus suited for operations off North America. Due to shortages, U-352 had no stern torpedo tube, but it carried the four bow torpedo tubes found on nearly all type VII U-boats.

== Prelude ==
Under the command of Kapitänleutnant Hellmut Rathke, U-352 began its first and only patrol off the United States' east coast on 7 April 1942, leaving St. Nazaire with 14 torpedoes. It carried a complement of 48. The trip from France took about three weeks, with the U-boat traveling at a slow speed to conserve fuel. U-352 arrived in American waters on 2 May. Rathke made the decision to remain on the surface and look for targets as he moved south. As such, U-352's crew were constantly on lookout for American aircraft and the U-boat had to crash-dive several times to evade patrol planes. Despite these encounters, the U-boat was never damaged.

On 5 May, off Cape Hatteras, U-352 fired two torpedoes at the Swedish merchant ship Freden. Both torpedoes missed but the ship's crew believed they had been hit and decided to abandon ship. U-352 then lost contact. Freden's captain ordered all crew to reboard the ship and got underway. The next day, U-352 encountered the ship again and fired two more torpedoes, both of which missed. Once again, Freden's crew believed they had been hit and abandoned ship. Freden turned her stern at the U-boat to appear as a smaller target. However, U-352 interpreted this move as the ship running off full-speed and ceased chasing the ship. After floating in their lifeboats all night, the crew of Freden drifted back alongside the undamaged vessel. They reboarded and continued on their journey. U-352 surfaced, presumably to attack again, but a twin-engine plane was spotted heading towards the U-boat by its lookouts. Rathke ordered a crash dive and only surfaced an hour later.

== Action ==
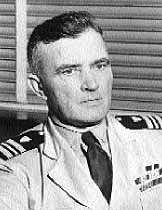
Lieutenant Jester, photographed in 1944, was Icarus' commanding officer

On 8 May, Icarus departed Staten Island and was bound for Key West. Her executive officer was Lieutenant Edward D. Howard of the US Coast Guard Reserve, and her commanding officer was Lieutenant Maurice D. Jester. On 9 May, the cutter entered the waters off Cape Lookout, the southernmost point of the Core Banks. She was roughly 25 miles (40 km) offshore. The cutter's communications officer sent a message to the commandant of the Sixth Naval District to inform him that they had entered the region, and got a cold "Received" in reply. The day was warm and overcast, with an almost flat sea—visibility was 9 miles (14 km). Icarus was traveling at a speed of 14 knots (16 mph; 26 km/h) with heading of 238° PGC.

At 1620, a sound contact was made by the cutter's sonar. The contact, described as mushy, was detected 1,900 yards (1,700 m) off the port bow. It was reported to Howard in the pilothouse. No vessel could be seen on the surface, and Howard decided not to call for general quarters. The object was moving slower than Icarus but on a parallel course. Five minutes later, the contact suddenly improved as the cutter began to overtake the object. Howard then called Jester to the bridge. Rathke had initially believed the ship he spotted to be a small freighter, but upon realizing it was Icarus, decided to attempt to sink her.

At 1629, an explosion roughly 200 yards (180 m) off the cutter's port quarter rocked her; general quarters was sounded, and Jester was given command of the ship. Howard suspected that a torpedo had missed Icarus but struck the seabed, as they were operating in shallow water. A swirl of mud and water was visible about 200 yards (180 m) off the cutter's port quarter. U-253 had fired one bow torpedo from periscope depth. In hopes of avoiding Icarus' depth charges, Rathke took the U-boat to the spot of the torpedo explosion and then grounded it.

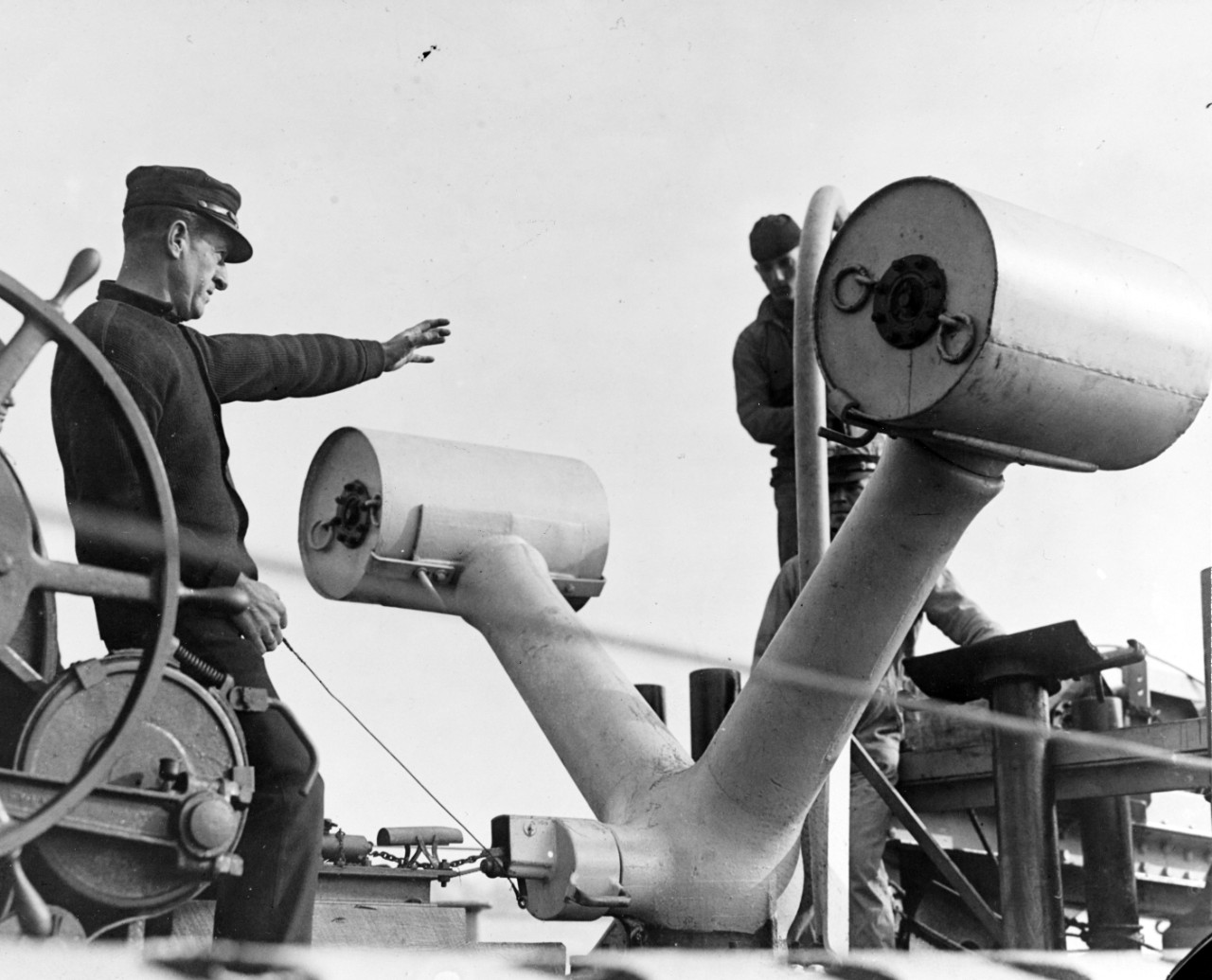
This Y-gun was photographed aboard a US Navy ship in 1918. A similar Y-gun was used to launch depth charges from the deck of Icarus.

At Jester's order, Icarus reversed her course, making her heading 70° PGC. The U-boat's propellers were audible as it passed under the cutter's wake. Icarus dropped a diamond pattern of five depth charges on the eastern edge of the torpedo explosion's swirl, sent out from the cutter's Y-gun. These depth charges damaged U-352, causing Rathke to decide to play dead in hopes of going unnoticed. The periscope was destroyed, all lights save for the emergency ones failed, and one officer was killed. A buoyancy tank was ruptured and a portion of the conning tower's plating was blown off. The electric motors may have also failed. Icarus then circled the spot and dropped three more depth charges in a "V" pattern at 1645; one came from a depth charge rack and two came from the Y-gun. Large air bubbles were observed on the surface, and Icarus dropped another depth charge at 1702. She reversed her course and dropped another at just six minutes later. These depth charges forced the U-boat to surface, and it emerged from the water at 1710. It was down by the stern.

Prior to surfacing, Rathke instructed his crew to don lungs and lifejackets and then gave the command to abandon ship. The petty officer in charge of the diesel engines reportedly said: "You crazy dogs, we can run on our diesels." As its crew began preparing to scuttle U-352, several emerged onto the conning tower to jump overboard. Fearing U-352's crew was going to man its deck gun, Icarus opened fire with a .50 caliber machine gun on the starboard quarter and a .30 caliber machine gun on the flying bridge. U-352 was roughly 1,000 yards (910 m) away from Icarus. The machine guns killed several German crewmen and damaged the hull and conning tower. The U-boat's gunner later stated that they had intended to man the 2cm anti-aircraft gun after surfacing but was dissuaded from doing so by Icarus' gunfire. Rathke said they did not use the deck gun as the angle of the U-boat was too great and Icarus was firing.

Icarus' 3-inch gun

The 3-inch gun aboard Icarus was brought to bear. The first two shells straddled U-352. Firing a total of 14 times, 6 direct hits were scored on the hull and conning tower and 1 ricochet was observed. Thirty-three men from U-352 left the U-boat from its conning tower and swam away from it, abandoning ship at 1711. The German U-boat sank at 1714, just 300 yards (270 m) from Icarus. The cutter's crew then ceased firing.

== Rescue operations ==
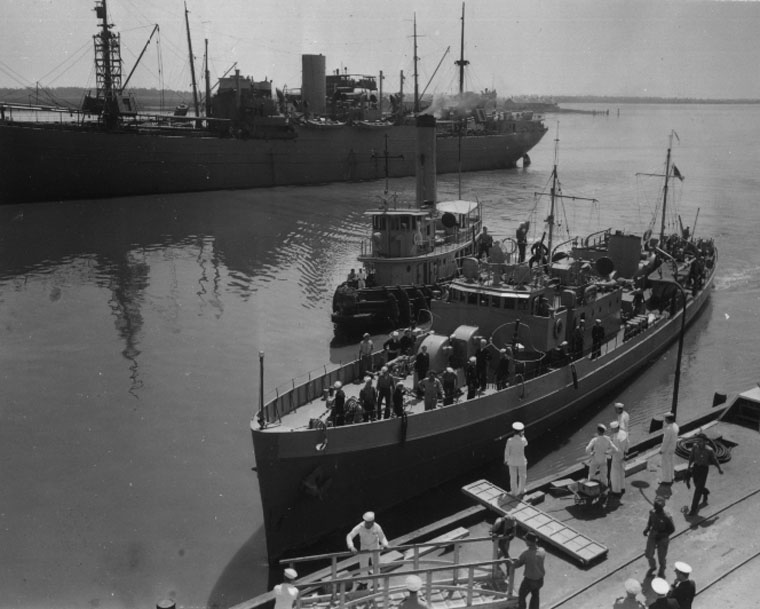
Icarus arriving at Charleston Navy Yard on 10 May with the survivors of U-352

Survivors of U-352 disembarking Icarus

Icarus began circling the spot that U-352 went down. She soon picked up another sonar contact. The cutter proceeded to the indicated area and dropped another depth charge at 1734. A large amount of light diesel order came to the surface. Jester then ordered for Icarus to leave the site of the action, departing for about an hour. At the time, no American warship had captured enemy combatants during World War II. Howard dispatched a message requesting instructions on how to proceed. The received orders instructed the cutter to rescue the survivors and then proceed to the Charleston Navy Yard in Charleston, South Carolina. Icarus was then directed to return for the survivors. Rathke had warned his crewmen not to give any information to the Americans. Four of his crewmen were injured. He attempted to apply a tourniquet on the machinist's mate, Gerd Russel, who had a severed leg.

Rescue operations began at 1750. Many German crewmen called out not to be killed, fearing they would be machine-gunned. The wounded were taken on first. All prisoners were searched as they came aboard; the thirty men who were not wounded were placed under guard in the forward compartment of the cutter. All of U-352's crew were aboard Icarus by 1805. Icarus left for Charleston following a zig-zag pattern. Russel died of his wounds at 2215. He had been kept on deck, albeit in a litter, to keep him in warm air and give him little handling.

Several German crewmen spoke English and spoke freely with Icarus' crew on personal matters but did not disclose any military information. Three of Icarus' crew spoke German and spoke with the prisoners. The prisoners wished to know how much money the crew would receive for sinking a submarine and if they would be promoted for doing so. They stated they received medals and bonuses for sinking ships, with the amount of the bonus depending on the number of ships and their tonnage. Four mentioned they had relatives in the United States. During the trip, it was discovered that the U-boat Icarus sank was U-352.

Icarus arrived in Charleston the next day, 10 May. 32 prisoners were disembarked at 1130. They were the first foreign prisoners of war on American soil since the War of 1812. The prisoners would be interrogated before being sent to American prisoner-of-war camps. Russel was buried with military honors at the National Cemetery in Beaufort, South Carolina. In total, 15 members of U-352's crew died as a result of the action.

== Aftermath ==
In the action report, Howard praised several members of Icarus' crew: the sonar operators, engineering department, 3" gun operator, Jester. Howard recommended several crewmen for promotions. The commander of the Gulf Sea Frontier recommended that Jester be awarded recognition for his actions. For his actions, Jester was awarded the Navy Cross and was promoted to lieutenant commander. He would also appear in Life magazine, being featured on the cover of the 14 December 1942 issue. US Naval authorities did not disclose information about U-352's sinking until a year after it occurred, with the goal of keeping Nazi high command in doubt about the U-boat's fate.

The Navy salvage vessel USS Umpqua relocated the U-boat shortly after its sinking and began conducting salvage operations. On 23 May, it was located by a Navy diver. He reported that the U-boat was resting on its starboard side at an angel of 60° and its bow had a deep gash. Subsequent days' dives were unable to locate the shipwreck. Despite resting in shallow water, the divers did not recovered anything of military importance and salvage operations were discontinued.

Three months later, HMS Stella Polaris carried out a depth charge attack on the wreck after detecting a metallic target on the seafloor. Several more depth charges were deployed by the Coast Guard cutters 474 and 480. The depth charges' detonations resulted in air bubbles and oil rising to the surface. A diver was sent to investigate but found no submarine. Later grappling attempts did eventually hook U-352. Another diver visited the scene and removed a 20 foot (6.1 m) section of deck grating. These operations were halted due to fears of unexploded depth charges. Later during the war, the Navy launched a survey mission to photograph the site with underwater cameras.
