= Torpedo Alley =

North Carolinian waters populated by U-boats in World War II

- Part of World War II, the Battle of the Atlantic, and the Second Happy Time
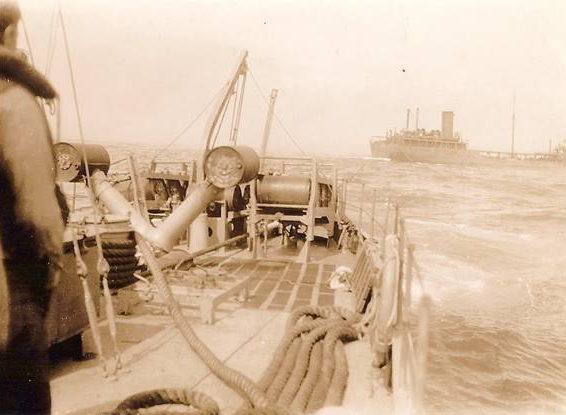
- USCGC Dione escorting a convoy through Torpedo Alley, 1942
Date	January–August 1942
Location	Waters off North Carolina, Mid-Atlantic Ocean
Result	German victory

Belligerents
United States; United Kingdom	Germany

Commanders and leaders
Harold Raynsford Stark; Ernest King; Royal Ingersoll (United Kingdom) Daniel de Pass	(Nazi Germany) Karl Dönitz (Nazi Germany) Robert-Richard Zapp (Nazi Germany) Rolf Mützelburg

Casualties and losses
~1,512 killed at least 87 ships sunk	145 killed 40 captured 4 submarines sunk

Torpedo Alley (also called Torpedo Junction or the Battle of Torpedo Junction) was a region off the coastline of the North Carolinan Outer Banks, including Cape Lookout and Cape Hatteras, where an estimated 80 to more than 100 Allied ships were sunk by German U-boats in World War II. Most of the ships were sunk during the German Navy's Second Happy Time in 1942, which lasted from January, a month after the United States entered the war, until August, when the U.S. instituted a convoy system. The losses in this relatively small region accounted for about one-quarter of the U.S. wartime shipping losses in oceans around North America.

== Overview ==
After Germany declared war on the United States on December 11, 1941, Rear Admiral Karl Dönitz began to implement Operation Paukenschlag (transl. Operation Drumbeat): U-boat attacks on Allied merchant ships off the East Coast of the United States. Allied merchant ships were nearly defenseless in the opening stages of Operation Drumbeat. They usually sailed with their lights on and without zig-zagging.

The most intense attacks took place off the Outer Banks of North Carolina, chosen because the narrow continental shelf allowed the submarines to hide in nearby deep water. Moreover, ships passing the lights of Outer Banks settlements, lighthouses, and light buoys, were illuminated in silhouette to waiting submarines. It was said by inhabitants of Hatteras that the flames from torpedoed tankers burned so brightly that one could read a newspaper at night. All sorts of flotsam—including oil, wreckage, and bodies—washed up on the beaches. The losses in the region led Allied sailors to call the region "Torpedo Alley" or "the Battle of Torpedo Junction" by the crew of the US Coast Guard cutter Dione.

== Sunken ships ==
=== Allied vessels ===
SS Empire Gem

Empire Gem was a 10,600-ton British tanker built in 1941, armed with one 4-inch (100 mm) gun, one 12-pounder anti-aircraft gun and six machine guns. While off Diamond Shoals on the night of January 23, 1942, U-66 under Robert-Richard Zapp detected the unescorted Empire Gem and the unarmed American ore carrier SS Venore. A few hours later, at about 2:40 am on January 24, U-66 attacked by firing a spread of torpedoes at Empire Gem. One of them struck the tanker at the tanks on the starboard side and the ship immediately began to burn and sink. The U-boat then fired additional torpedoes; one struck the Venore, which also sank. Both vessels sent out an SOS and shortly after an American motor lifeboat from Ocracoke Coast Guard Station arrived to rescue survivors. Fifty-five men out of fifty-seven were killed on Empire Gem including Royal Navy gunners and another seventeen men were killed on the Venore. Twenty-three survivors from both ships were later rescued by American forces.

SS San Delfino

San Delfino was an 8,702-ton armed British tanker. She was attacked east of Cape Hatteras at position 35°35′N 75°06′W on April 10, 1942, by U-203 under Captain Lieutenant Rolf Mützelburg. At 3:47 am San Delfino was hit by a torpedo but it had no effect. A second spread missed their target but a final shot hit the ship at 5:08 am, sinking the vessel, killing twenty-eight men and sending another twenty-two into the water. The action occurred early in the morning, and the gunners aboard had not been able to see a target. It took seven torpedoes altogether to destroy the ship. The Master and twenty-one crew members were rescued later on by the naval trawler HMT Norwich City and landed at Morehead City.

SS Dixie Arrow

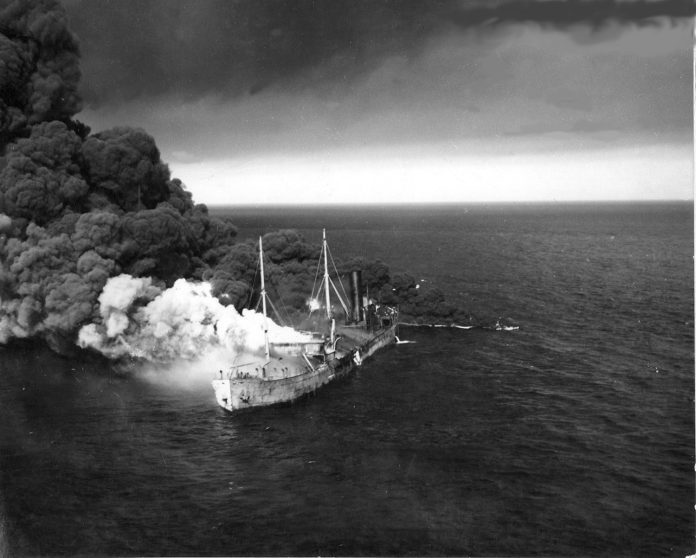
Dixie Arrow on fire and sinking

On March 19, 1942, Dixie Arrow left Texas City, Texas, bound for the city of Paulsboro, New Jersey. She carried 86,136 bbl (13,694.5 m^{3}) of crude oil to be used for the Allied war effort, following a forty-fathom (240 ft; 73 m) curve off Cape Hatteras due to the captain's concerns about the shallow depth of the water. The tanker soon sailed into the hunting grounds of German U-boats, and was torpedoed thrice on March 26 by U-71 just around 9:00 AM. Dixie Arrow broke in two due to the explosions. Able seaman Oscar Chappell turned the ship into the wind to save crewmen trapped by fire on the bow, but was killed by the flames in doing so. Only one of the ship's lifeboats safely made it away, the other three either being destroyed in the initial explosions or succumbing to the fire that had engulfed the ship. The crew was never able to send a distress signal. The US Navy destroyer USS Tarbell arrived around 9:30 AM, roughly half an hour after Dixie Arrow had been torpedoed. The destroyer dropped multiple depth charges in hopes of sinking U-71, though none of them did anything to harm it. USS Tarbell rescued 22 of the ship's 33-man crew, taking them to Morehead City, North Carolina.

HMT Bedfordshire

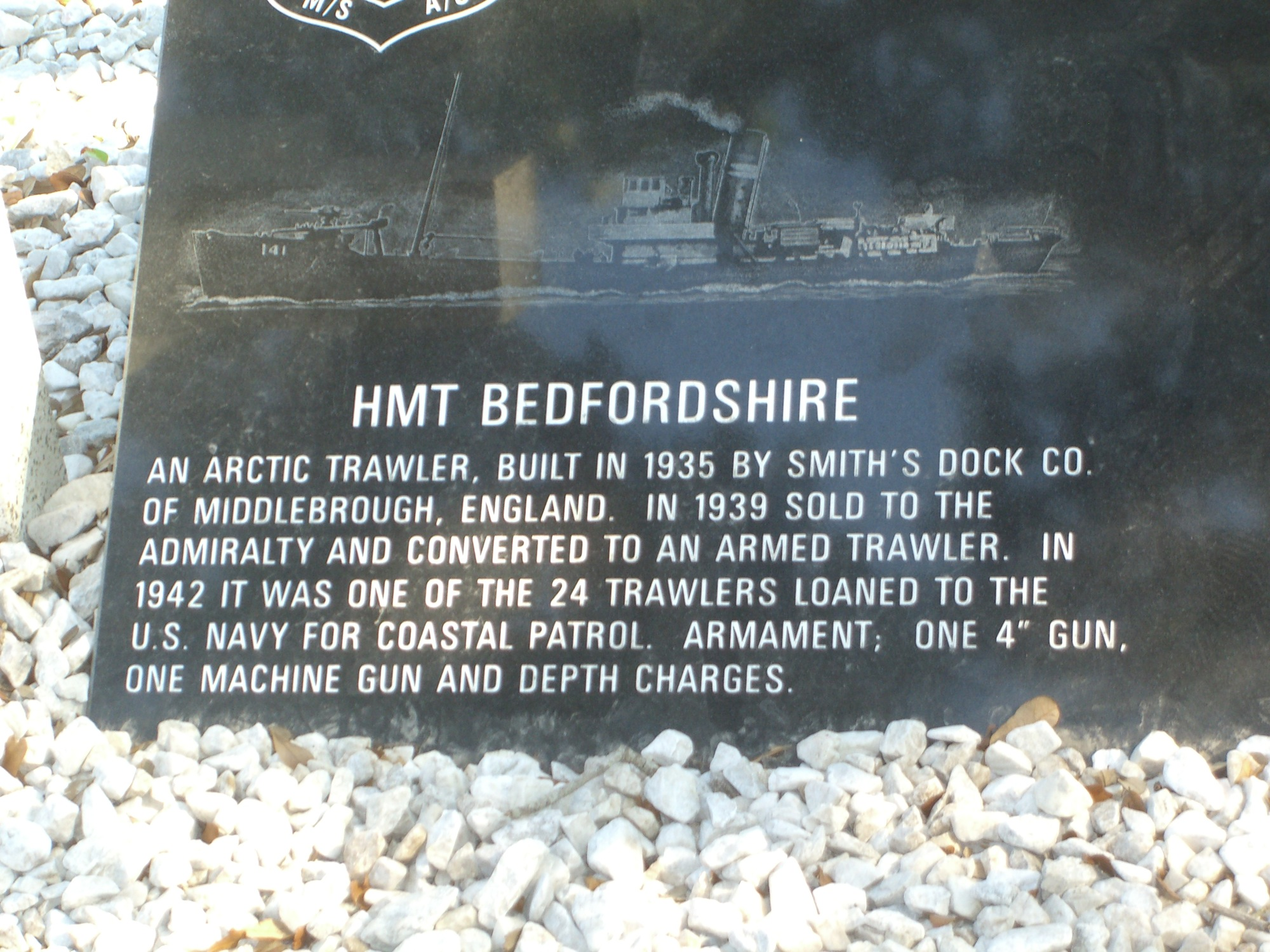
A plaque on Ocracoke Island commemorating those killed on HMT Bedfordshire.

Bedfordshire was a 443-ton British trawler. On May 10, Bedfordshire and HMT Lowman were deployed from their base at Morehead City to Ocracoke Island to search for a U-boat spotted in the area. When the vessels arrived they were discovered by Captain Lieutenant Gunther Krech of U-558 who proceeded to shadow the vessels until later that night. Krech fired a spread of torpedoes at the Lowman after assuming he had been detected by the British ships, but they all missed. The British then maneuvered and began dropping depth charges but these failed to destroy their target. At 5:40 in the morning on May 11, the U-boat fired a single torpedo at Bedfordshire which missed but a second hit the trawler and it quickly sank with all thirty-seven hands. Two bodies were eventually recovered by the Americans who buried the dead on Ocracoke, creating the British Cemetery there.

HMT Kingston Ceylonite

The next warship sunk was Kingston Ceylonite, another British naval trawler serving in American waters off North Carolina. On June 15, Kingston Ceylonite was sailing off Virginia Beach in convoy KN-109 when she unknowingly entered a sea mine field laid by U-701 four days earlier. The British trawler struck one mine at position 36°52′N 75°51′W and sank. Thirty-three men went down with the ship and only eighteen survived. Two other tankers and the destroyer USS Bainbridge also hit mines that night but were saved from sinking. Some of the dead washed up on Ocracoke Island and were interred with the men of Bedfordshire.

USS YP-389

The small 170-ton American trawler YP-389 was destroyed during an action with U-701 in the early morning on June 19. German Captain Horst Degen decided to surface the submarine and engage with his deck guns in order to save torpedoes. Armor-piercing rounds splashed all around the American ship for an hour and a half before she sank. Because of a faulty firing pin in the trawler's 3-inch (76 mm) dual purpose gun, only .30-06 Springfield rifles, .30 cal machine guns and depth charges could be used to defend the ship. Of a 25-man complement, six American seamen were killed in battle and the eighteen remaining went adrift. The Germans suffered no casualties though U-701 sustained slight damage.

SS William Rockefeller

William Rockefeller was a one-gun American tanker of 14,054 tons, sunk 16 nautical miles (30 km) east-northeast of Diamond Shoals on June 28, 1942. At 6:16 pm, Horst Degen's U-701 released a torpedo which hit William Rockefeller's pump room on portside amidships while she was steaming on a non-evasive course at 9.2 knots. The torpedo tore a twenty-foot hole in the ship and oil sprayed everywhere, causing a fire. The pump room flooded along with one of the ship's tanks and the cargo aboard caught on fire. Nine officers, thirty-five crewmen and six armed guards evacuated the ship and were picked up twenty minutes later by USS CG-470 which then depth charged the area inconclusively. U-701 surfaced the following morning around 5:20 am and delivered a coup de grâce which sank the American ship at position 35°11′N 75°07′W without loss of life.

=== German U-boats ===
U-85

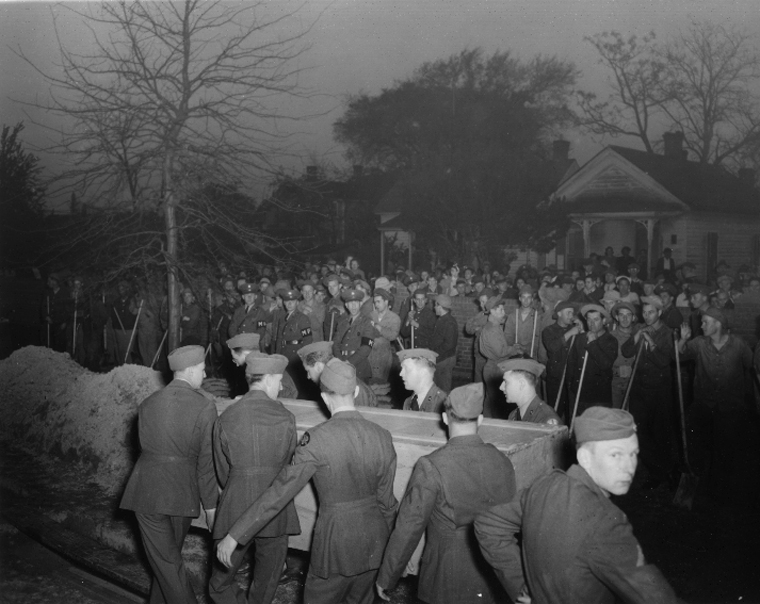
The funeral for twenty-nine Germans from U-85 at Hampton National Cemetery.

The first of three German U-boats sunk during the battle for Torpedo Alley was U-85, sunk at midnight on April 13, 1942. While operating within sight of Bodie Island Lighthouse, the destroyer USS Roper detected the surfaced U-85 on radar at a range of 2,700 yards. As the German submarine attempted to head south, the Roper closed to 700 yards. U-85 fired a torpedo from her stern and began firing with her deck gun, but the American destroyer evaded all of the shots. U-85 then turned to starboard and closed to within 300 yards of the Roper, which opened fire with a 3-inch (76 mm) gun and machine guns. The destroyer hit the U-boat once before she submerged, and then dropped 11 depth charges, sinking the sub. All 46 German crew members were killed; the Roper recovered 29 of their bodies. Some of the dead were wearing civilian clothing and had wallets with U.S. currency and identification cards, suggesting that the submarine had been involved in landing German agents on the mainland. A nighttime military funeral was held for the dead Germans at Hampton, Virginia. The hatch of U-85 is now on display at Cape Hatteras Lighthouse and the enigma machine resides at the Graveyard of the Atlantic Museum in Hatteras.

U-352

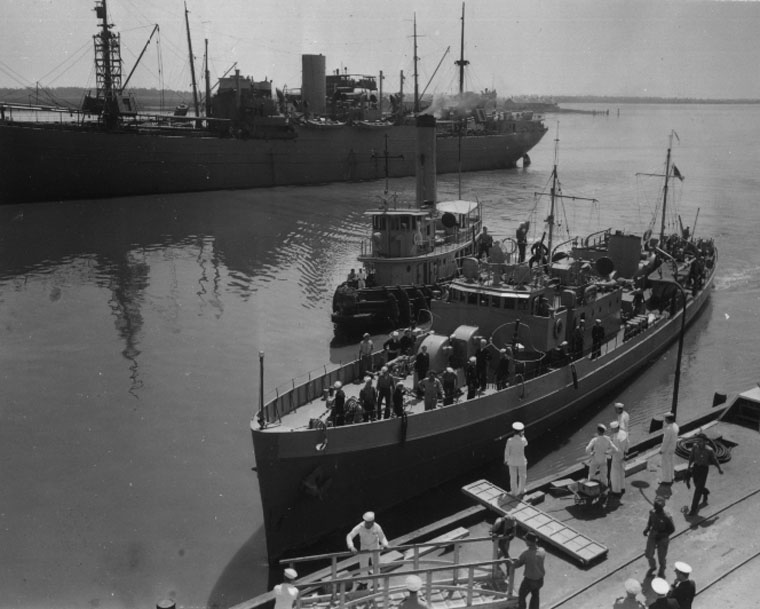
USCGC Icarus delivering prisoners from U-352 to Charleston Navy Yard.

U-352, under Captain Lieutenant Hellmut Rathke, was destroyed on May 9, 1942, by the United States Coast Guard. At position 34°21′N 76°35′W, off Cape Lookout, the USCGC Icarus picked up a sonar contact just before a torpedo exploded nearby. Lieutenant Maurice D. Jester knew right away that they were under attack by a submarine and he suspected where the Germans would fire their next torpedo from. The Americans maneuvered and dropped five depth charges, and when sonar detected the U-boat again, Icarus moved accordingly and dropped two more charges, forcing the Germans to surface. Then a short surface action occurred as Icarus opened fire with machine guns and prepared to ram the enemy U-boat. Before the range closed, the crew of U-352 evacuated their ship and the Americans ceased fire after dropping one last depth charge as the submarine sank. The Icarus left the scene but was ordered to return and pick up the German submariners still in the water. Fifteen Germans were killed and 33 survivors were taken to Charleston, South Carolina, the following day. Jester received a Navy Cross for his victory over the Germans. The remains of the U352 lie in 115' of water, 26 miles South of Beaufort inlet, NC.

U-701

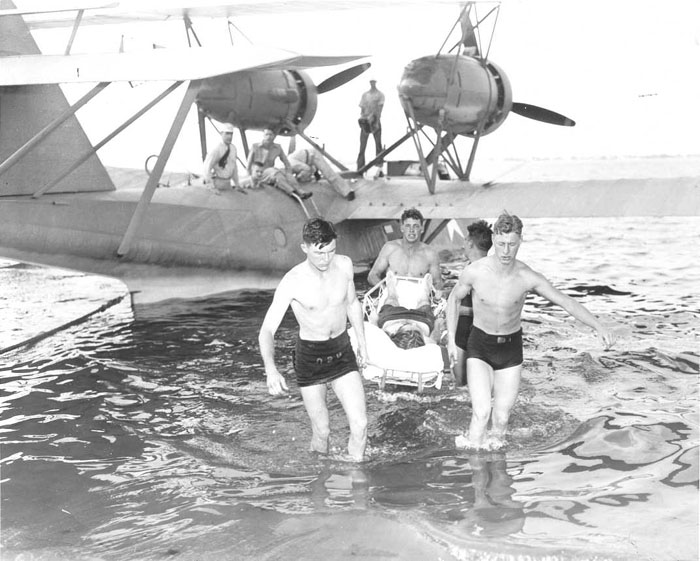
German survivors from U-701 going ashore at Naval Station Norfolk on June 9, 1942, after being rescued by a US Coast Guard seaplane.

The destruction of U-701 happened on July 7, 1942, near Cape Hatteras, and was the last sinking of a German submarine in Torpedo Alley. American Lockheed Hudson aircraft from the United States Army 396th Bombardment Squadron attacked the surfaced U-701 with depth charges. The attack was successful and the U-boat sank with 29 hands. Seventeen survivors then went adrift in lifeboats for two days; when they were rescued by American forces, only seven remained. The submarine rests in 110' feet of water near Cape Hatteras, NC.

German casualties in Torpedo Alley totaled 100 dead and forty captured.

== See also ==
- List of shipwrecks of North Carolina
