= Sinking of U-85 =

1942 naval action of World War II

- Part of the Second Happy Time during World War II
- An oil painting of USS Roper chasing U-85, from the 1967–68 edition of Jane's Fighting Ships
Date	14 April 1942
Location	East of Bodie Island, North Carolina 35°55′N 75°15′W
Result	American victory

Belligerents
United States	Germany

Commanders and leaders
(United States) Hamilton W. Howe (United States) Stanley C. Norton	Eberhard Greger (MIA)

Units involved
USS Roper	U-85

Strength
110 crewmen	46 crewmen

Casualties and losses
None	1 U-boat scuttled 46 officers and crew killed
- Location in the North Atlantic Ocean

The sinking of U-85 was a naval action of World War II that took place just after midnight on 14 April 1942. The German submarine U-85 was likely deliberately sunk by its own crew after a brief engagement with the American destroyer USS Roper. All 46 members of the U-boat's crew were killed. U-85 had been on its fourth patrol and was operating off the Outer Banks of North Carolina.

German U-boats had been operating off the Atlantic coast of the United States since January 1942, as part of Operation Drumbeat. The operation was the German plan to disrupt shipping to the United Kingdom, and either reduce the war efforts of the United Kingdom or the United States or knock both countries out of World War II. Their initial efforts in January and February 1942 proved successful, leading the Germans to assign more U-boats to the crucial shipping lanes off the American coast. This period became known as the Second Happy Time by German commanders.

U-85 was located off North Carolina by USS Roper using the destroyer's new radar system. The officers aboard the destroyer initially mistook the U-boat for a fishing boat or Coast Guard vessel due to its small size. U-85 then fired a torpedo from its rear that narrowly missed the destroyer; this confirmed the craft to be a German U-boat. A machine gun aboard the destroyer prevented U-85's crew from reaching their deck gun to return fire on Roper, and the U-boat's conning tower was damaged by one of the destroyer's naval guns. The damage inflicted by Roper's crew was insufficient to sink the U-boat, and evidence suggests it was scuttled by its crew.

The bodies of 29 of U-85's crew were recovered the next morning by Roper. They were buried with military honors in Hampton, Virginia. For their actions during the engagement, two senior officers aboard Roper were awarded the Navy Cross, four crewmen were given Silver Star Medals, and the destroyer's crew as a whole was praised by her captain. The action marked the first time that an enemy submarine was sunk in American home waters by the United States Navy. The Navy attempted to salvage the wreck of the submarine to recover its Enigma machine for intelligence purposes, but two and a half weeks of operations proved unsuccessful.

== Background ==
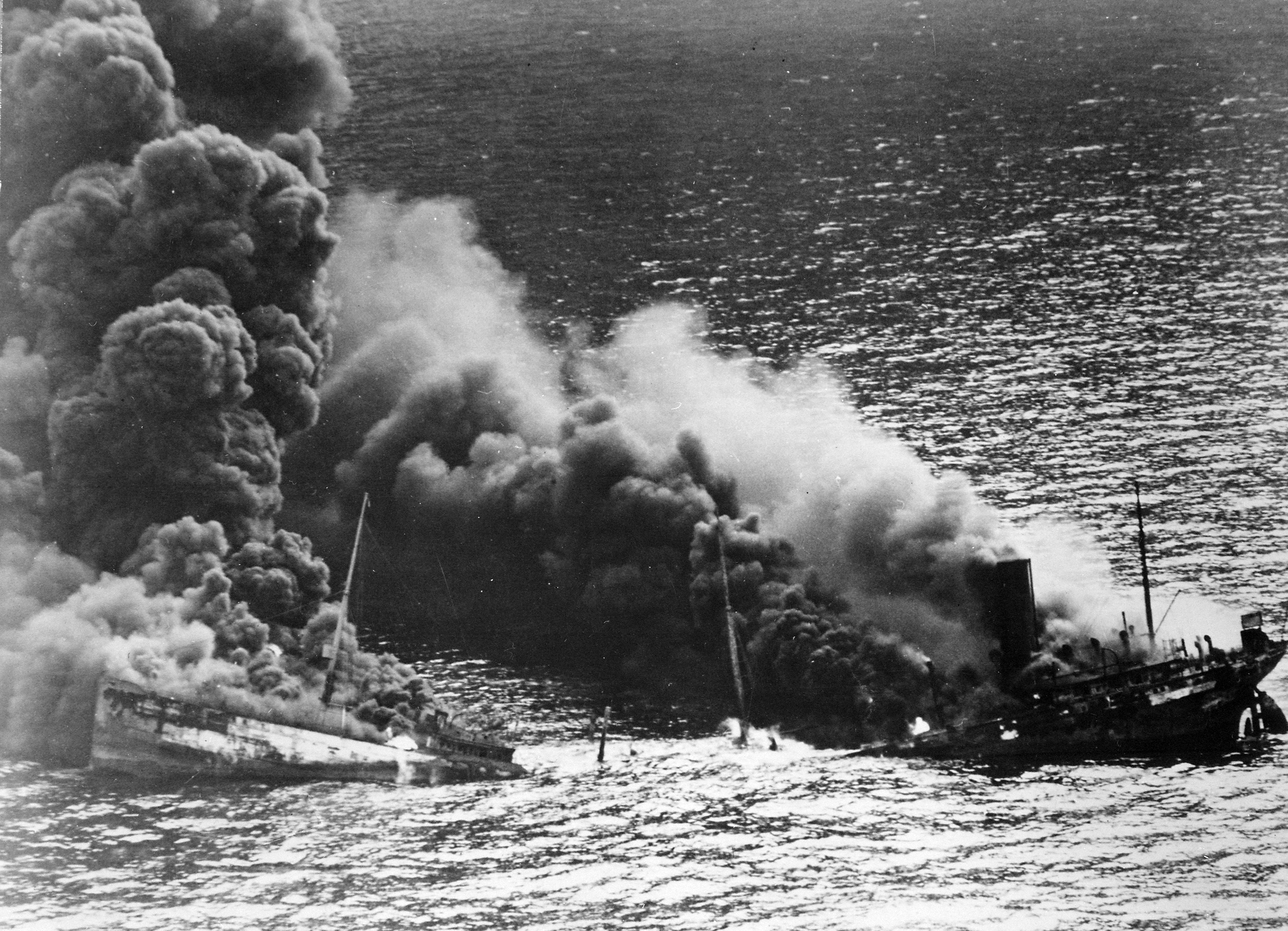
The American tanker Dixie Arrow sinking off the Outer Banks in March 1942; she was one of many vessels sunk by U-boats during the Second Happy Time.

Operation Drumbeat was the German plan to attack Allied shipping along the East Coast of the United States. German commanders hoped that sinking Allied ships in their own waters would either reduce the war efforts of the United States and United Kingdom or knock them out of the war completely. Five U-boats were sent out in the first wave. The Germans were astonished by their initial success, with 23 Allied ships sunk in January and February 1942. In response to these successes, eight more U-boats were sent out to the American coast. The early months of 1942 became known to German commanders as the Second Happy Time. (Note: The First Happy Time had occurred in 1941 following the fall of France, when French ports gave U-boats direct access to the Atlantic Ocean; during that period, the Germans sank 282 ships in four months.)

The waters off North Carolina were given the nickname "Torpedo Alley" due to the high number of Allied merchant ships sunk by U-boats there during the Second Happy Time. The region was a common shipping lane, and vessels often passed through without following a zig-zagging pattern—which would make it harder for U-boats to hit them—and with their lights on. While there were naval patrol vessels in the region, they were few in number and slow, unseaworthy, or inappropriate for anti-submarine efforts. The historian Michael Gannon described the Fifth Naval District, where Torpedo Alley lay, as "the best organized and trained antisubmarine warfare force" on the East Coast. However, their initial attempts to combat German U-boats were ineffective. U-boat commanders described the American defenses as improvised and said American forces obviously lacked training. One said that there was "no evidence that the Americans were switching over to wartime conditions". Lighthouses were in full operation, radio stations provided navigation assistance to ships, and coastal defense stations gave details of rescue operations and the schedules of aerial and naval anti-submarine warfare patrols. On 1 April, the Fifth Naval District announced a new "hunter-killer" doctrine to aggressively detect and defeat U-boats. The strategy called for placing all of its available watercraft and aircraft on intensified ocean patrols.

USS Roper was a Wickes-class destroyer that was commissioned in February 1919 for service with the United States Navy. She was moved to the naval operating base at Norfolk, Virginia, in March 1942, assigned to patrol and escort duty in the waters of the Fifth Naval District. She was equipped with new radar systems to assist in anti-submarine warfare. The destroyer's complement consisted of 110 men.

U-85 was commissioned in June 1941. It was a type VIIB U-boat, one of just 24 built for the navy of Nazi Germany (Kriegsmarine). The U-boat was commanded by Oberleutnant zur See Eberhard Greger, who had been in that position since it was commissioned. U-85 was attached to the Third U-boat Flotilla. The VII types, of which U-85 was a derivative, were capable of traveling long distances and were thus suited for operations off North America. The U-boat's complement consisted of 46 men.

== Prelude ==
Crewmen aboard U-85; this photograph was found on one of the bodies recovered by Roper after the U-boat sank.

U-85 left Saint-Nazaire, France, for its fourth patrol on 21 March 1942. This patrol was its first off the East Coast of the United States, though not its first off North America; it had spent its third patrol off Canada. The U-boat carried a complement of 46. The U-boat was off New England between 8 and 10 April. On 10 April, it sank the Swedish freighter Christina Knudsen in the waters off New Jersey. U-85 then headed to its assigned station off Cape Hatteras, a body of water that makes up part of North Carolina's Outer Banks. It positioned itself in the shallow waters east of Bodie Island on 13 April. The U-boat spent the day waiting for merchant ships to pass. Late that night, the U-boat broke the surface of the water.

Roper left Norfolk in the evening of 13 April, around 1840, for anti-submarine patrols. Her commanding officer was Lieutenant Commander Hamilton W. Howe. Also aboard was Commander Stanley C. Norton, the commander of Destroyer Division 54. Roper was the flagship of the division. Roper had replaced the destroyer USS Jacob Jones, another Wickes-class destroyer that had been sunk off New Jersey on 28 February by U-578.

It took two and a half hours for the destroyer to pass False Cape, which she did so by 2110, before entering the Graveyard of the Atlantic. She soon arrived at her assigned patrol box, which had been based on intelligence received by the Fifth Naval District. The destroyer made a contact at 2238, and Howe veered Roper off course but did not order general quarters. One depth charge was dropped, and the destroyer resumed her course. At 2300, both Howe and Norton turned in for the night and gave command to the officer of the deck, Ensign Kenneth Tebo.

== Action ==
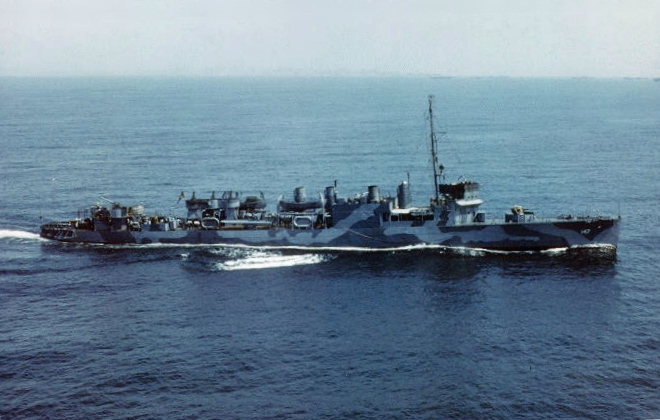
USS Roper underway in 1942

At midnight on 14 April, a crew change occurred on the destroyer. The sky was clear and starlit and the sea was calm. Wind was blowing from the southeast with a force of one. Off the destroyer's starboard (right) side were the Bodie Island Lighthouse and Bodie Island Bell Buoy No. 8. At 0006, while making 18 knots (21 mph; 33 km/h) with a heading of 182° true, and after having just put the Wimble Shoal Light astern, the crew of Roper made a radar contact. The object they detected had a heading of 190° true and was 2,700 yards (2,500 m) away. Roper's radio crew then called out to Tebo about the object. Tebo acknowledged this and sent a quartermaster to wake Captain Howe. Howe decided to let Tebo pursue the object, believing it to be nothing more than a fishing boat or Coast Guard vessel. After propeller sounds were detected by her underwater sensors, Roper's speed was increased to 20 knots (23 mph; 37 km/h) and was brought to a heading of 195° true.

Greger likely decided to try to evade the destroyer and escape on the surface, as the water in this region was only about 100 feet (30 m) deep. This would make it dangerous for the U-boat to submerge. U-85 only had a speed of 17 knots (20 mph; 31 km/h) while traveling on the surface, meaning it would be unable to outrun the destroyer.

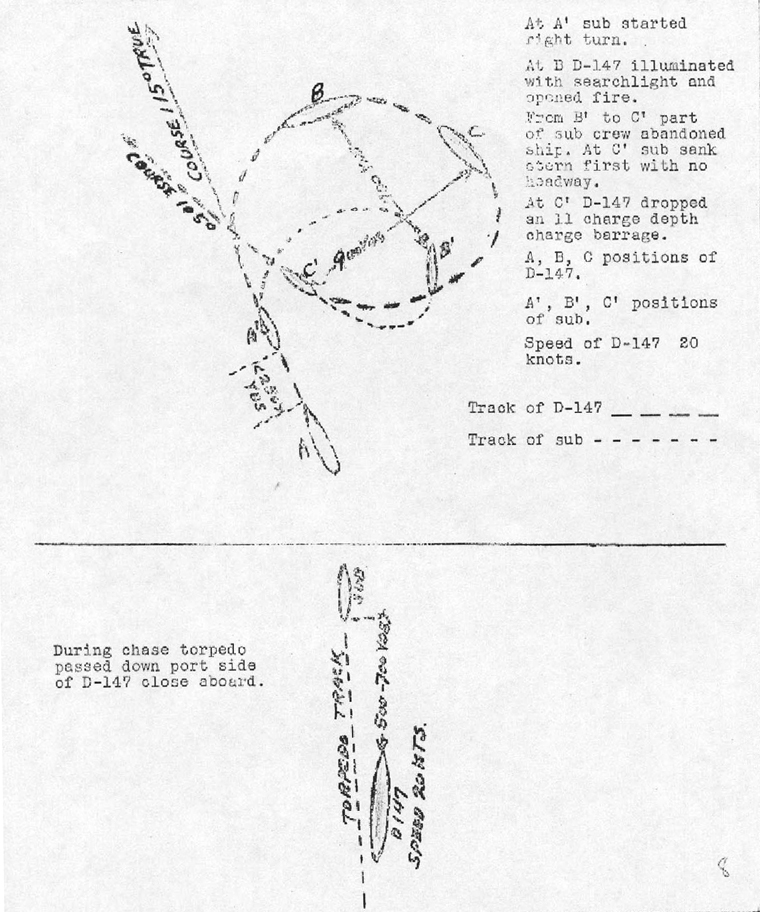
A diagram of the action from Howe's initial report. The top half of the diagram shows the maneuvers of Roper and U-85, and the bottom half shows when the torpedo nearly hit Roper during the chase.

About 2,100 yards (1,900 m) away from the object, the wake of a small vessel running away at a high speed was observed by lookouts on the bow. Howe called the crew to general quarters and told them to prepare to open fire. The machine guns, 3-inch naval guns, torpedoes, and depth charge batteries were readied. The unknown vessel began to turn to port (left) as the destroyer approached it. Roper remained in the starboard quarter behind and to the vessel's right to avoid being struck by possible torpedoes, as U-boats could launch them from the rear using the torpedo tubes located in their sterns. The vessel's wake revealed its wide arc to the left, heading towards deeper water; its behavior was consistent with that of enemy submarines. When Roper was about 700 yards (640 m) astern of the vessel at 0034, a torpedo passed down the destroyer's port side and nearly hit her, missing by just 50 yards (46 m). The torpedo had been fired from U-85's stern tube likely in an attempt to shake the destroyer off its trail. This confirmed the suspicion that Roper was pursuing a U-boat. The chase continued for about ten minutes.

The U-boat turned sharply to starboard when Roper was 300 yards (270 m) away, likely trying to align its bow to launch another torpedo. Tebo ordered the destroyer hard to starboard to follow suit. However, the U-boat's turning radius was much smaller than Roper's. Her 24 in (61 cm) searchlight was directed on U-85 at 0045 by Lieutenant Commander William Vanous, the executive officer, who had taken up station on the flying bridge at the beginning of the action. The U-boat was only about 200 yards (180 m) to starboard and was quickly turning. Roper's crew could see German sailors rushing from the conning tower towards U-85's deck gun, which was an 8.8 cm SK C/35 naval gun powerful enough to sink a destroyer. The searchlight was held on the U-boat as it turned to starboard, remaining inside the turning radius of the destroyer.

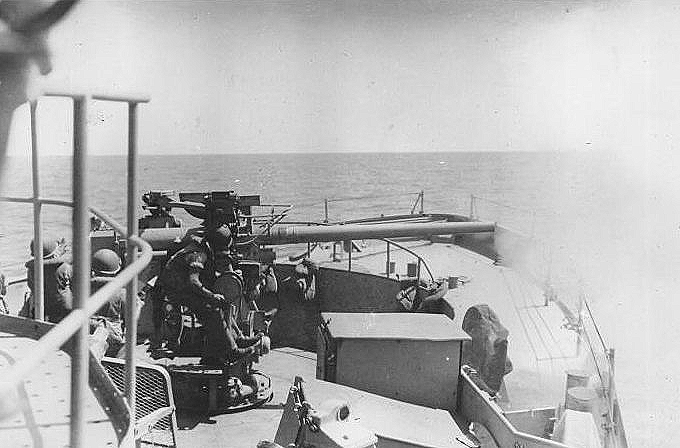
A 3-inch gun being fired aboard USS Pivot. Roper was equipped with several of these; while two misfired, gun No. 5 scored a hit on U-85.

With the object now identified as an enemy submarine, Howe gave the order to open fire. The No. 3 3-inch/.50 gun atop Roper's deckhouse misfired thrice. The gun of the same caliber on the starboard side misfired once. The .50-caliber machine gun atop the deckhouse misfired a total of five times. Both of the 3-inch guns' cases were thrown overboard to have the guns ready for further action. In one instance, the case pulled away from the projectile and the latter had to be removed separately. The same thing occurred when trying to unload another gun that was unable to bear during the action. Later inspections of the cartridges revealed indentations in their primers, which may have been a result of weathering. Their crews also may have pulled the triggers before loading the shells.

Chief Boatswain's Mate Jack Wright, who was at the No. 1 .50-caliber machine gun that sat beside the No. 3 3-inch gun, pushed the machine gun's gunner aside and cleared the weapon. He then opened fire on the U-boat's deck gun. Some members of the gun crew were hit, some scrambled behind the gun or conning tower for cover, and others jumped into the water. The gun swept all across the deck of U-85, keeping the Germans away from the deck gun. Howe wrote in his report that Wright "opened fire so promptly and effectively that he was a major factor in bringing about the destruction of the submarine." As the U-boat slowed in speed, it had its port side facing Roper. The destroyer also slowed down, though it was to avoid losing the U-boat in the dark.

The No. 5 3-inch gun, positioned on Roper's stern, had a gun crew led by Coxswain Harry Heyman. Heyman had replaced the previous gun captain just two days earlier and had never been in charge of the weapon during a firing. Firing four rounds, the No. 5 gun landed a direct hit on the U-boat's conning tower, near the waterline. The shot breached the U-boat's pressure hull and sent up smoke and debris. The gun fired at U-85 several more times over the course of the action.

Around this time, Greger likely gave the order to scuttle the U-boat. The stern torpedo doors were likely opened to allow water to enter. Its crew subsequently scrambled out and leapt into the water, some donning life jackets. The U-boat settled slowly and by the stern. Howe ordered a torpedo fired to finish off U-85, but the U-boat disappeared beneath the water before a torpedo could be fired. Howe speculated that the U-boat had been scuttled in his after-action report.

Several members of U-85's crew were subsequently spotted in the water. The exact number of crewmen is unknown—Vanous wrote that he thought he saw 35 men, Howe saw about 40, and Tebo recalled about 25. They waved at the men aboard Roper, crying for help and shouting "comrade". The officers on Roper's bridge ordered a life raft to be launched. When the crew prepared to do so, they found that the raft had become caught in the destroyer's rigging. In his 1989 book Torpedo Junction, Homer Hickam says the raft could not be launched as the "bolts [were] painted over and frozen." The sonar operator then reported "an excellent sound contact". Roper abandoned rescue efforts and pursued the contact, not wanting to be sunk by another U-boat. Howe gave the order to extinguish the searchlight.

K-guns and depth charges aboard USS Chaffee. The ones aboard Roper would have been arranged similarly

The destroyer dropped a barrage of 11 depth charges, set to explode at 50 feet (15 m) from her racks and her Y and K guns while at a course heading of 105° true. This was done to ensure that U-85 had actually sunk. Roper released them as she steamed right through the group of U-boat crewmen that were still floating in the water, and the depth charges killed those that had not drowned. Roper was secured from general quarters at 0100. At 0130, Roper radioed the Fifth Naval District communications office at Norfolk with news of the action. The sinking of U-85 marked the first time that the United States Navy had sunk an enemy submarine in American home waters.

== Recovery and burial of U-85's crew ==
It was considered too dangerous to conduct any rescue operations before daybreak. Roper remained in the general area of U-85's sinking, zig-zagging and sending out sonar pings. The U-boat's wreckage could not be detected due to the darkness. On two occasions Roper passed survivors floating in the water, but no rescues were attempted due to the concern of other U-boats possibly in the area. Howe returned to his cabin and wrote a report on the action.

Search operations began just after 0700. A PBY plane, having arrived at 0607 from Langley Field in Hampton, Virginia, cooperated with Roper in an intensive sight search, investigating oil slicks and bits of debris. The plane dropped one depth charge and the destroyer dropped two. At 0706, smoke floats were dropped from two planes to direct attention to the presence of bodies in the water that were kept afloat by lifejackets. Two lifeboats were placed in the water at 0717, which commenced the recovery of bodies and their articles. An airship was observed approaching at 0727, and was asked to circle the destroyer to protect her from U-boats as her crew searched for bodies. Seven planes appeared on the scene at once, and a British trawler stood over near the end of the recovery operation and was asked to watch for submarines. At 0850, the sonar operator detected a sharp echo at 2,700 yards (2,500 m). This interrupted rescue efforts. Four depth charges were dropped at 0857. One large and one small air bubble appeared along with fresh oil. The airship and a plane dropped flares on the location as the airship's crew reported the appearance of the bubbles.

Crewmen aboard Roper hold a deceased U-85 crewman by his arms as they pull his body aboard.

A dead crewman from U-85 is transferred from Roper to the tugboat Scotia.

A total of 29 bodies were recovered by the crew of Roper, lifted up using a davit. The last one was hauled up at 0930. The bodies were stacked atop a pallet amidships. Several crewmen looted the bodies for souvenirs but were quickly stopped by Howe. A canvas was placed over the bodies and a crewman was posted to stand guard. Two additional bodies had been found, but they had been allowed to sink after they had been searched for articles to be used by naval intelligence. Several empty lifejackets were seen floating in the water. At 0957, two more depth charges were dropped over the largest air bubble. Both air bubbles remained after the depth charging and were still seen as the destroyer left the scene. An orange buoy was placed in 14 fathoms (84 ft; 26 m) of water roughly 250 yards (230 m) away and heading 270° true from the largest air bubble. It was believed this was the location of the submarine.

Roper anchored in Lynnhaven Roads in the afternoon of 14 April. She was met by the Navy tugboat USS Scotia, which then took on the bodies carried by Roper. It was deemed impractical to attempt to identify the bodies aboard the tugboat. Scotia's crewmen also searched the bodies for souvenirs. The officers in charge of the investigation noted that many articles had likely been taken. A guard was placed aboard the tugboat to avoid further looting as the bodies were ferried to Naval Operating Base Norfolk. Naval Intelligence officers came aboard Roper at Lynnhaven Roads and told the officers and crew to keep quiet about the action.

Scotia arrived at 1835. The bodies were loaded onto stretchers and taken to a hangar. Photographs were taken of each body, showing their clothing and lifesaving apparatuses, and they were fingerprinted. An individual report was then made for each body, their names were noted, and their belongings were placed into envelopes. Six of them recovered had escape lungs, and two had tubing in their mouths. The only officer among the men was the chief engineer, who held the rank of Oberleutenant zur See. Two of the bodies had diaries, which were forbidden to have aboard U-boats. They belonged to a crewman of unknown rank and the senior engineman.

It was decided that U-85's crew would be buried with full military honors. There was an insufficient supply of caskets at the US Naval Hospital in Portsmouth, and private undertakers could not guarantee that the number needed would be available in time for burial. The manager of the Veterans Administration in Kecoughtan, Virginia, transferred twenty-nine standard Veterans Administration caskets and shipping boxes from his stock. The cost of the caskets and shipping boxes was billed to the Navy's Medical Corps.

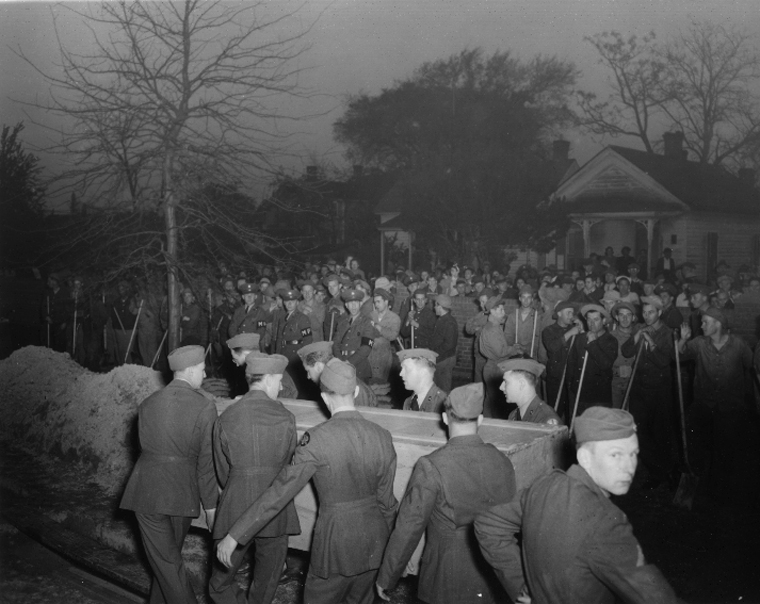
Pallbearers carry a coffin with a deceased U-85 crewman

On 15 April, the bodies were removed from Naval Operating Base Norfolk. Each was placed in a casket and then sealed in a shipping box. The bodies were loaded into trucks and taken in a convoy to Hampton, Virginia. The convoy arrived around dusk. The bodies were then buried at Hampton National Cemetery. Fifty-two prisoners from Fort Monroe dug the graves, and the caskets were then individually lowered into them. US Army soldiers served as pallbearers. Catholic and Protestant chaplains read the burial service at 2000. A firing party of Navy sailors fired three volleys over the graves, and "Taps" was played by a Navy bugler. The prisoners then filled in the graves. A large crowd of spectators had gathered on the other side of the cemetery's perimeter wall despite no public statement having been made regarding the sinking of U-85 and the recovery of the bodies. The story that the bodies were of deceased Germans was quickly leaked. Authorities attempted to confuse the locals by stating the graves were for merchant seamen killed by U-boats.

== Aftermath ==
The sinking of U-85 would not be formally reported to the public until three weeks after the sinking, when a story with inaccurate accounts was released. It said that Roper's crew "went to the rails to help lift the surviving members of the submarine crew out of the water". On 23 July, the Navy announced the burial of U-85's crew with no details of which U-boat it was or the names of the deceased. The statement simply described the burial rites. The Navy refused to answer follow-up questions.

Howe and Norton were awarded the Navy Cross for destroying U-85 without damaging the destroyer or having any personnel injured or killed. In the action report, Howe wrote that the crew of Roper "conducted themselves creditably" and that it was "difficult to single out individuals for special praise". Despite this, Heyman, Tebo, Vanous, Wright, and Norton were all mentioned by name and praised. Heyman, Tebo, Vanous, and Wright received Silver Star Medals for their actions during the engagement.

=== Navy involvement with the wreck ===
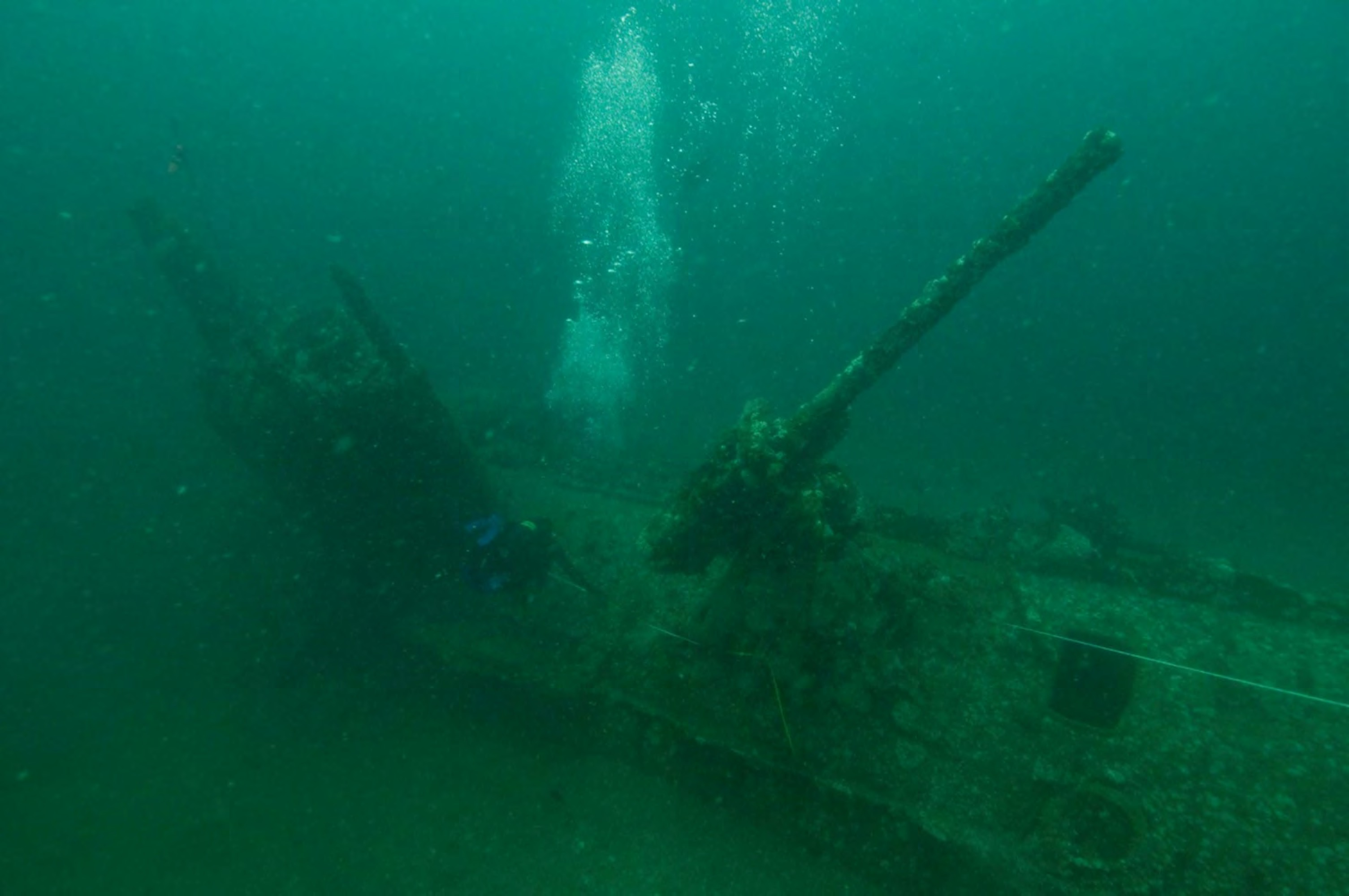
The wreck of U-85 in 2008. Its deck gun and conning tower are clearly visible.

As U-85 had sunk in shallow waters, the US government had hopes of exploring and salvaging its wreck. Within 24 hours of the sinking, a Navy Experimental Diving Unit from Washington arrived to conduct an initial survey and see if it was possible to refloat the U-boat and recover its Enigma machine, which could provide important military intelligence. They were transported by HMT Bedfordshire, a British trawler, and stopped at the orange buoy left by Roper. Dives began on 16 April. The divers partially dismantled the deck gun but recovered the U-boat's 20 mm anti-aircraft gun, the gun sights for the deck gun, some elements from its gyroscope, the IZO torpedo aimer, and other instruments from its bridge. They were unable to remove the U-boat's topside torpedo, which was carried in an external watertight container on deck.

Bedfordshire left for convoy escort duty on 20 April, and the fleet tug USS Kewaydin arrived to replace her on 22 April. The second diver to go to the wreck discovered an unexploded MK IV depth charge along its starboard side; all further dive expeditions were halted until the mine was exploded by the Navy Mine Disposal Unit four days later. This explosion likely damaged the U-boat. Over the course of seven more dives, divers attached buoyed lines to the wreck. USS Falcon, a diving and salvage ship, arrived at the wreck on 29 April. Navy divers "closed conning hatches, traced salvage air lines, manufactured fittings[,] and pumped air into the hull." Roper's depth charges had damaged her air lines and tankage. This meant that air could escape the damaged hull of U-85 and it would be impossible for the wreck to be raised.

Diving operations ended on 4 May, with the commanding officer of Falcon concluding that U-85 "was thoroughly and efficiently scuttled" by its crew and that salvage could be done with extensive pontooning operations. The Navy did not return to the wreck. It lies in 100 feet (30 m) of water just 14.3 nautical miles (16.5 mi; 26.5 km) northeast of Oregon Inlet. The wreck of U-85 is listed on the National Register of Historic Places and is considered a war grave.
