= HMCS Barrie =

Flower-class corvette

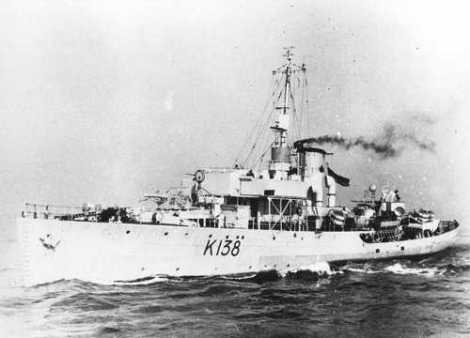
- HMCS Barrie

History

Canada
- Name: Barrie
- Namesake: Barrie, Ontario
- Ordered: 1 February 1940
- Builder: Collingwood Shipyards Ltd., Collingwood
- Laid down: 4 April 1940
- Launched: 23 November 1940
- Commissioned: 12 May 1941
- Decommissioned: 26 June 1945
- Identification: Pennant number: K138
- Honours and awards: Atlantic 1941–45, English Channel 1942
- Fate: Sold for mercantile use 1947; purchased by Argentine Navy 1957

Argentina
- Name: ARA Capitán Cánepa
- Acquired: taken over from mercantile interests
- Commissioned: 1957
- Out of service: 1972
- Fate: Broken up 1972

General characteristics
- Class & type: Flower-class corvette (original)
- Displacement: 950 long tons (970 t)
- Length: 205 ft 1 in (62.51 m) o/a
- Beam: 33 ft 1 in (10.08 m)
- Draught: 13 ft 5 in (4.09 m)
- Propulsion: single shaft; 2 × Scotch boilers; 1 × 4-cylinder triple-expansion reciprocating steam engine; 2,750 ihp (2,050 kW)
- Speed: 16 knots (30 km/h; 18 mph)
- Range: 3,450 nmi (6,390 km; 3,970 mi) at 12 kn (22 km/h; 14 mph)
- Complement: 47
- Sensors & processing systems: 1 × SW1C or 2C radar; 1 × Type 123A or Type 127DV sonar
- Armament: 1 × BL 4-inch (101.6 mm) Mk.IX single gun; 2 × .50 cal machine gun (twin); 2 × Lewis .303 cal machine gun (twin); 2 × Mk.II depth charge throwers; 2 × depth charge rails with 40 depth charges; originally fitted with minesweeping gear, later removed

HMCS Barrie was a Flower-class corvette that served with the Royal Canadian Navy during the Second World War. The ship was constructed by Collingwood Shipyards Ltd. at Collingwood, Ontario, laid down on 4 April 1940. The ship was launched on 23 November 1940 and commissioned on 12 May 1941. The corvette was named for the city of Barrie, Ontario. Barrie served primarily in the Battle of the Atlantic as a convoy escort. Following the war, Barrie was sold to Argentinian commercial interests which converted the corvette to a cargo ship and renamed the vessel Gasestado. In 1957, Gasestado was acquired by the Argentinian Navy and converted to a survey ship and renamed ARA Capitán Cánepa. The Argentinian Navy discarded the ship in 1972.

== Design and description ==
Flower-class corvettes such as Barrie serving with the Royal Canadian Navy (RCN) in the Second World War were different from earlier and more traditional sail-driven corvettes. The Flower-class corvettes originated from a need that arose in 1938 to expand the Royal Navy following the Munich Crisis. A design request went out for a small escort for coastal convoys. Based on a traditional whaler-type design, the initial Canadian ships of the Flower class had a standard displacement of 950 long tons (970 t). They were 205 feet 1 inch (62.51 m) long overall with a beam of 33 feet 1 inch (10.08 m) and a maximum draught of 13 feet 5 inches (4.09 m). The initial 1939–1940 corvettes were powered by a four-cylinder vertical triple expansion engine powered by steam from two Scotch boilers turning one three-bladed propeller rated at 2,800 indicated horsepower (2,100 kW). The Scotch boilers were replaced with water-tube boilers in later 1939–1940 and 1940–1941 Programme ships. The corvettes had a maximum speed of 16 knots (30 km/h; 18 mph). This gave them a range of 3,450 nautical miles (6,390 km; 3,970 mi) at 12 knots (22 km/h; 14 mph). The vessels were extremely wet.

The Canadian Flower-class vessels were initially armed with a Mk IX BL 4-inch (102 mm) gun forward on a CP 1 mounting and carried 100 rounds per gun. The corvettes were also armed with a QF Vickers 2-pounder (40 mm, 1.6 in) gun on a bandstand aft, two single-mounted .303 Vickers machine guns or Browning 0.5-calibre machine guns for anti-aircraft defence and two twin-mounted .303 Lewis machine guns, usually sited on bridge wings. For anti-submarine warfare, they mounted two depth charge throwers and initially carried 25 depth charges. The corvettes were designed with a Type 123 ASDIC sonar set installed. The Flower-class ships had a complement of 47 officers and ratings. The Royal Canadian Navy initially ordered 54 corvettes in 1940 and these were fitted with Mark II Oropesa minesweeping gear used for destroying contact mines. Part of the depth charge rails were made portable so the minesweeping gear could be utilised.

=== Modifications ===
In Canadian service the vessels were altered due to experience with the design's deficiencies. The galley was moved further back in the ship and the mess and sleeping quarters combined. A wireless direction finding set was installed, and enlarged bilge keels were installed to reduce rolling. After the first 35–40 corvettes had been constructed, the foremast was shifted aft of the bridge and the mainmast was eliminated. Corvettes were first fitted with basic SW-1 and SW-2 CQ surface warning radar, notable for their fishbone-like antenna and reputation for failure in poor weather or in the dark. The compass house was moved further aft and the open-type bridge was situated in front of it. The ASDIC hut was moved in front and to a lower position on the bridge. The improved Type 271 radar was placed aft, with some units receiving Type 291 radar for air search. The minesweeping gear, a feature of the first 54 corvettes, was removed. Most Canadian Flower-class corvettes had their forecastles extended which improved crew accommodation and seakeeping. Furthermore, the sheer and flare of the bow was increased, which led to an enlarged bridge. This allowed for the installation of Oerlikon 20 mm (0.8 in) cannon, replacing the Browning and Vickers machine guns. Some of the corvettes were rearmed with Hedgehog anti-submarine mortars. The complements of the ships grew throughout the war rising from the initial 47 to as many as 104.

== Construction and career ==
=== Canadian service ===
Ordered as part of the 1939–1940 Flower-class building program, Barrie was laid down by Collingwood Shipyards Ltd. at Collingwood, Ontario on 4 April 1940. The corvette was launched on 23 November 1940 and commissioned on 12 May 1941 at Montreal, Quebec. Named for the community in Ontario, the ship was given the pennant number K138. After commissioning Barrie was assigned to Sydney Force, operating as a local anti-submarine escort out of Sydney, Nova Scotia in the Battle of the Atlantic. The corvette left Sydney Force in September and joined the transatlantic convoy SC 43 en route to Iceland. However, the ship left the convoy early due to defects and sailed for Belfast, Northern Ireland, for repairs. While alongside in Belfast, Barrie was the first Canadian corvette to have a Type 271 radar installed. After returning to operations, Barrie was assigned to the escort group 6 and escorted the convoys ONS 50 and SC 51 across the Atlantic without incident between December 1941 and January 1942. In February 1942, with the withdrawal of American ships from convoy escort duties, Barrie was re-assigned to escort group A2. On 9 February 1942, the corvette rescued 38 survivors from the British merchant ship Empire Fusilier which had been torpedoed and sunk south east of St John's, Newfoundland by U-85.

In May 1942 Barrie was assigned to the Western Local Escort Force (WLEF), escorting convoys along the coast of North America. The corvette remained with the WLEF until near the end of the war. In June 1943 she was assigned to escort group W-1. Barrie stayed with W-1 for much of the war except for a short period in late 1944 where she was temporarily assigned to escort group W-8. Barrie's second refit began in mid-March 1944 at Thompson Brothers in Liverpool, Nova Scotia where her forecastle was extended. After trials off Bermuda, the corvette joined HX 357 for the ship's last convoy mission, leaving New York City for Europe on 19 May 1945. Upon Barrie's return to Canada, the ship was paid off on 26 June 1945 at Sorel, Quebec. For the vessel's service during the Second World War, Barrie was awarded the battle honours "Atlantic 1941–45" and "English Channel 1942".

=== Argentinian service ===
The corvette was sold to Argentine mercantile interests in 1947. The ship was renamed Gasestado. In 1957 Gasestado was taken over by the Argentine Navy and renamed Capitán Cánepa. Capitán Cánepa was used as a survey vessel until being broken up in 1972.
