= Stanley C. Norton =

Stanley Cook Norton
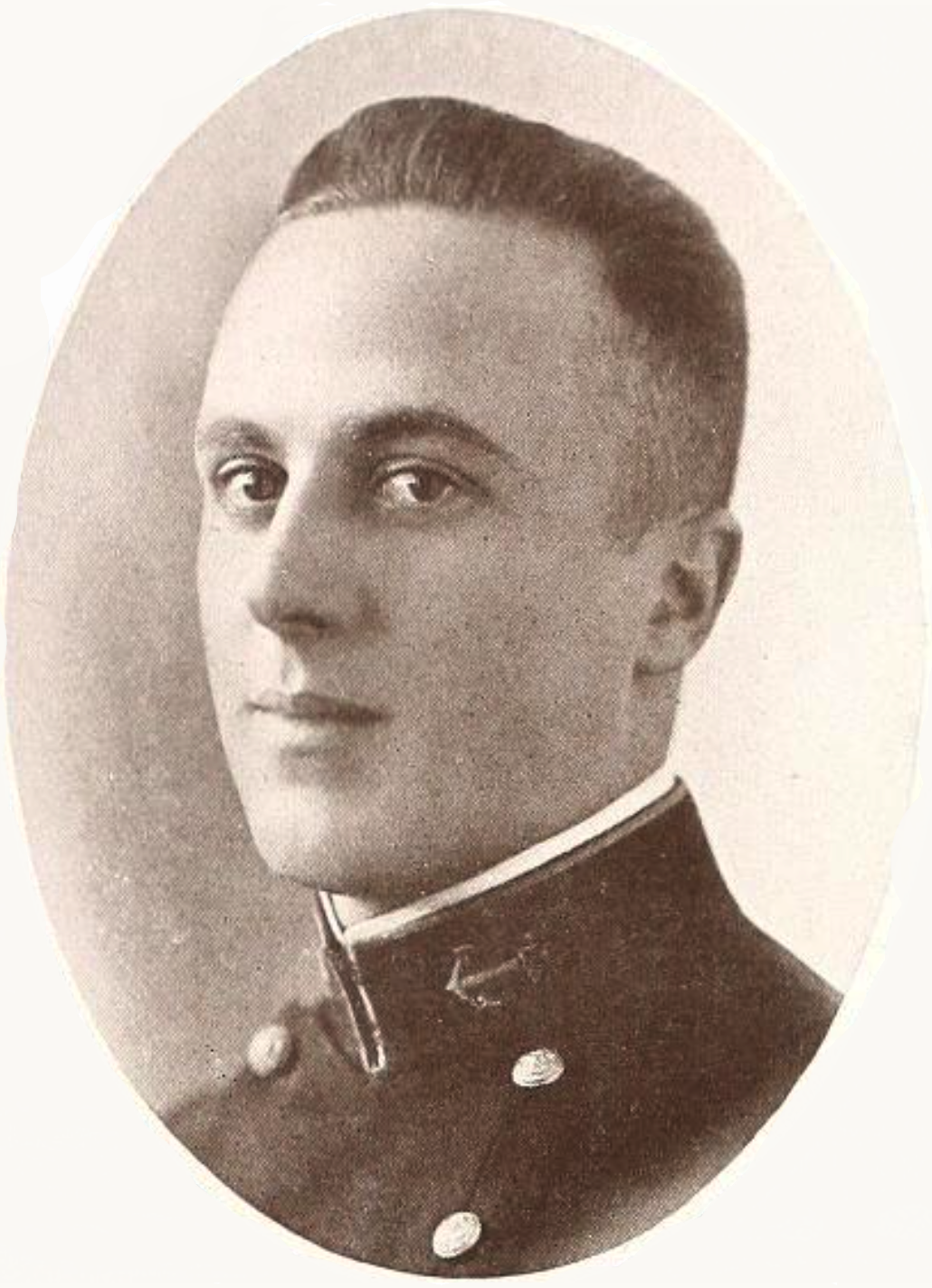
- Born: November 19, 1894; Falmouth, Maine, U.S.
- Died: April 4, 1978 (aged 83); Portsmouth, New Hampshire, U.S.
- Alma mater: United States Naval Academy
- Military career
- Allegiance: United States of America
- Branch: United States Navy
- Service years: 1914-1947
- Rank: Rear Admiral
- Commands: USS Pampanga; USS Twiggs; USS Salinas; Destroyer Division 54; USS Trenton
- Awards: Navy Cross

Stanley Cook Norton (19 November 1894 – 4 April 1978), was an American naval officer who served during World War II and reached the rank of Rear Admiral in the United States Navy.

== Early life and education ==
Stanley Cook Norton was born November 19, 1894, in Falmouth, Maine, to Frank K. and Flora Norton (née Cook).

== Military career ==
In 1914 he was accepted to the United States Naval Academy as a midshipman. While at the academy, Norton participated both football and basketball. "On March 4, 1917, the U.S. Congress authorized the academy to reduce its four-year program to graduating and to commissioning new Navy and Marine Corps officers in three years." Because of this authorization, Norton and the rest of the class of 1918 graduated June 28, 1917.

Upon early graduation from Annapolis, Norton was commissioned as an Ensign and assigned to the USS Montana. Due to the Act of May 22, 1917, he, along with many service men, received a temporary promotion to Lieutenant in June 1918. After his service on the Montana, he spent the next several years on various submarines, including the USS R-23, USS O-16, USS S-49 and USS S-31 as a prospective submarine commander. In 1924, he was assigned to the submarine base at New London; by 1927, he was commanding the gunboat USS Pampanga stationed in Hong Kong. In 1932, he was assigned to command of USS Twiggs; in 1934 he was a lieutenant commander and the gunnery officer of USS Richmond. In 1938, he was promoted to Commander and was assigned as a naval reserve instructor in 1939.

Norton was a "brusque, no non-sense commander" known for his command of Destroyer Division 54. Aboard his flagship, the USS Roper, he led Destroyer Division 54 in the successful attack and sinking of U-85, "the first German submarine sunk in World War II by a United States man-of-war." For this action, he, and the Roper's captain, were awarded the Navy Cross. Norton was promoted to Captain on 15 June 1942 and commanded the USS Trenton from June 1943 to June 1944.

Norton retired from the Navy after 30 years of service in July 1947, whereupon he was "placed, or advanced, upon the retired list to Rear Admiral in recognition of having been specially commended by the Secretary of the Navy or head of another executive department for performance of duty under in actual combat."

== Family ==
Norton's son, Stanley C. Norton Jr., was born while Norton was stationed in Hong Kong and died in 2016.
