= SS William Rockefeller =

Coordinates: 35°14′11″N 75°2′1″W

History
- Name: William Rockefeller
- Namesake: William Rockefeller
- Owner: Panama Transport Comp.
- Builder: Newport News Shipbuilding & Dry Dock Co., Newport News
- Yard number: 262
- Laid down: 15 December 1920
- Launched: 5 October 1921
- Completed: 9 November 1921
- Identification: US Official Number 221675; Call sign MDGF (1921–1933); Call sign KDVI (1934–1942)
- Fate: Sunk, 28 June 1942

General characteristics
- Type: Tanker
- Tonnage: 14,054 GRT; 8,790 NRT
- Length: 554 ft 9 in (169.09 m)
- Beam: 75 ft 3 in (22.94 m)
- Depth: 43 ft 0 in (13.11 m)
- Installed power: 621 Nhp, 3,800 ihp
- Propulsion: Newport News Shipbuilding & Dry Dock Co. 3-cylinder triple expansion
- Speed: 11.5 knots (13.2 mph; 21.3 km/h)
- Crew: 50 crew (44 crew members and 6 Naval Armed Guard)

SS William Rockefeller was a tanker ship built in 1921 and named after financier William Rockefeller. At the time of her sinking by a German submarine in 1942, the SS William Rockefeller was one of the world's largest tankers, and she was the largest to be lost off the North Carolina coast.

== World War II ==
The William Rockefeller was going to New York from Aruba through Torpedo Alley on June 28, 1942, carrying over 135,000 barrels of bunker "C" fuel oil, when the U-701 sent a torpedo into her port side amidships. A furious inferno ensued. The 44-member crew and her 6-member Naval Armed Guard abandoned her approximately 15 minutes later. They all survived, being picked up by CG-470 and taken to the Ocracoke Coast Guard Station. The ship burned and drifted for 11 hours, and sank after the U-701 fired another torpedo into her. The U-boat escaped, despite aerial and naval attacks, only to be sunk a week later.

The sinking was reported to have occurred 16 miles ENE of Diamond Shoal Light Buoy but the actual final resting place is unknown.
