= SS Empire Fusilier =

World War II merchant ship of the United Kingdom

History
- Name: Mincio (1921-40); Empire Fusilier (1940-42)
- Owner: Pietro Ravano Fu Marco (1921-30); Unione Società Anonima di Navigazione (1930-1940); Ministry of Shipping (1940-41); Ministry of War Transport (1941-42)
- Operator: Pietro Ravano Fu Marco (1921-30); Unione Società Anonima di Navigazione (1930-1940); Watts, Watts & Co. (1940-42)
- Port of registry: (Kingdom of Italy) Genoa, Italy (1921-40); Liverpool, United Kingdom (1940-42)
- Builder: Cantiere Cerusa
- Launched: 1921
- Out of service: 9 February 1942
- Identification: Italy Official Number 1042 (1921–40); Code Letters NYZO (1921–34); Code Letters IBEW (1934–40); United Kingdom Official Number 166306 (1940–42); Code Letters GMJG (1940–42)
- Fate: Torpedoed and sunk

General characteristics
- Type: Cargo ship
- Tonnage: 5.404 GRT, 3,184 NRT
- Length: 120.14 m (394 ft 2 in)
- Beam: 15.77 m (51 ft 9 in)
- Depth: 8.38 m (27 ft 6 in)
- Installed power: Triple expansion steam engine, 337 NHP
- Crew: 41, plus 6 DEMS gunners (Empire Fusilier)

Location where Empire Fusilier was torpedoed and sunk

Empire Fusilier was cargo ship which was built as Mincio in 1921 by Cantiere Cerusa, Voltri, Italy for Pietro Ravano Fu Marco, Genoa. She was seized as a prize of war in 1940, passing to the Ministry of Shipping and renamed Empire Fusilier, serving until torpedoed and sunk by U-85 in 1942.

== Description ==
The ship was 120.14 m (394 ft 2 in) long, with a beam of 15.77 m (51 ft 9 in). She had a depth of 8.38 m (27 ft 6 in). She was assessed at 5,404 GRT, 3,184 NRT.

The ship was propelled by a triple expansion steam engine, which had cylinders of 26, 42 1/2 and 69 7/16 inches (66.0, 108.0 and 176.4 cm) diameter by 48 inches (120 cm) stroke. The engine was built by G. Fossati & Co., Sestri Ponente. It was rated at 337NHP.

== History ==
Mincio was built in 1921 by Società Anonima Cantieri Cerusa, Voltri, Italy for Pietro Ravano Fu Marco, Genoa. The Italian Official Number 1042 and Code Letters NYZO were allocated. An accident occurred whilst the ship was at Bridgeport, Connecticut, United States on 14 July 1921. Three crew were killed by hydrocyanide fumes during fumigation of the ship's holds. Two others were recovered unconscious. Mincio was sold to the Unione Società Anonima di Navigazione in 1930. In 1934, her Code Letters were changed to IBEW.

On 10 June 1940, the day the Italy declared war on the United Kingdom Mincio was at Liverpool, Lancashire. She was immediately seized as a prize of war and was passed to the Ministry of Shipping, which later became the Ministry of War Transport. She was renamed Empire Fusilier. The Code Letters GMJG and United Kingdom Official Number 166306 were allocated. Her port of registry was Liverpool and she was placed under the management of Watts, Wats & Co. Ltd.

Empire Fusilier was a member of Convoy OB 268, which departed from Liverpool on 1 January 1941 and dispersed at sea. She left the convoy and returned, arriving at the Clyde on 6 January. She departed from the Clyde on 15 January, arriving at Liverpool the next day. She was a member of Convoy OB 288, which departed from Liverpool on 18 February and dispersed at sea on 22 February. Again she returned, this time due to steering problems. She arrived at Oban, Argyllshire on 20 February, sailing on 26 February to join Convoy OG 54, which had departed from Liverpool the previous day and arrived at Gibraltar on 14 March. Empire Fusilier again left the convoy and returned, arriving at Oban on 1 March. She sailed on 11 March to join Convoy OB 296, which had departed from Liverpool the previous day and dispersed at sea on 15 March. She was bound for Tampa, Florida, United States. where she arrived on 9 April. She sailed on 8 May for the Hampton Roads and Halifax, Nova Scotia, Canada, where she arrived on 18 May. She departed from Halifax on 24 May for Sydney, Nova Scotia, arriving two days later. Carrying a cargo of phosphates, she joined Convoy SC 33, which sailed on 1 June and arrived at Liverpool on 21 June. She put in to Loch Ewe on 19 June to join Convoy WN 143, which departed from Oban the next day and arrived at Methil, Fife on 25 June. She then joined Convoy FS 524, which departed from Methil on 24 June and arrived at Southend-on-Sea, Essex on 26 June. She left the convoy at Middlesbrough, Yorkshire on 25 June.

Empire Fusilier sailed from Middlesbrough on 11 August to join Convoy EC 58, which had sailed from Southend-on-Sea the previous day and arrived at the Clyde on 15 August. She left the convoy at Loch Ewe on 14 August and then sailed to Tampa, where she arrived on 9 September. She sailed on 29 September for the Hampton Roads, arriving on 30 September and departing three days later for Sydney, where she arrived on 8 October. Empire Fusilier was a member of Convoy SC 49, which departed from Sydney on 11 October and arrived at Liverpool 27 October. She was carrying a cargo of phosphates. She left the convoy at Loch Ewe on 26 October and joined Convoy WN 198, which departed from Oban that day and arrived at Methil on 29 October. Again Empire Fusilier had steering defects. She later joined Convoy FS 651, which departed from Methil on 19 November and arrived at Southend-on-Sea on 21 November.

Empire Fusilier was a member of Convoy FN 576, which departed from Southend-on-Sea on 11 December and arrived at Methil on 13 December. She left the convoy on 13 December and put in to the River Tyne, sailing on 11 January 1942 to join Convoy FN 602, which had departed from Southend-on-Sea that day and arrived at Methil on 13 January. She then joined Convoy EN 35, which departed from Methil on 22 January and arrived at Oban on 25 January. She left the convoy at Loch Ewe, later sailing to join Convoy ON 60, which departed from Liverpool on 26 January and arrived at Halifax on 15 January. On 9 February, Empire Fusilier was torpedoed and sunk in the Atlantic Ocean south east of Saint John's, Newfoundland(44°45′N 47°25′W) by U-85. Six crew and three DEMS gunners were killed. Thirty-five crew and three gunners were rescued by HMCS Barrie. Seven of her crew are commemorated on the Tower Hill Memorial in London.
