= USCGC Icarus =

United States Coast Guard patrol boat

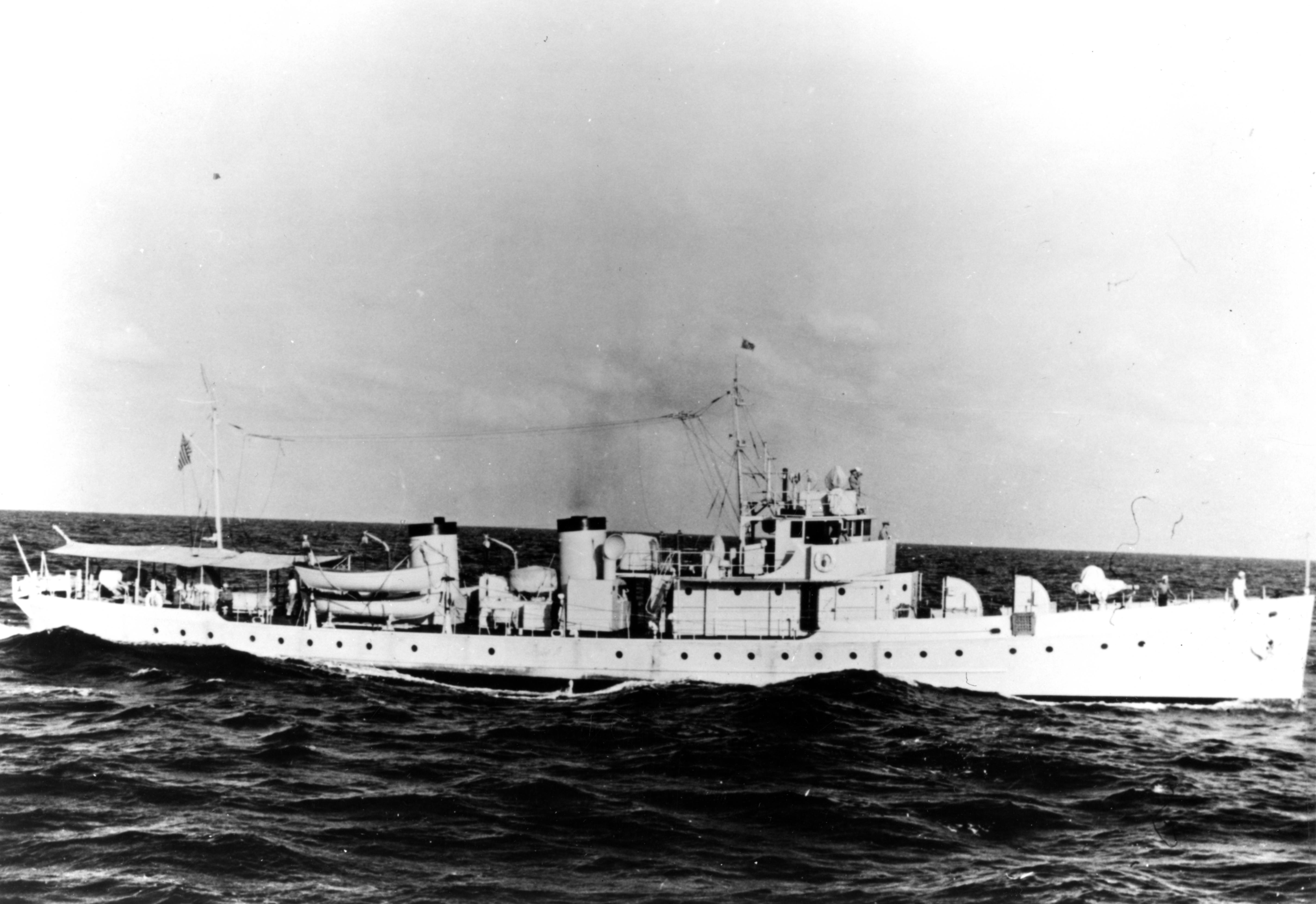

History

United States
- Name: USCGC Icarus (WPC-110)
- Namesake: Icarus
- Builder: Bath Iron Works hull 153
- Launched: 19 March 1932
- Acquired: 29 March 1932
- Commissioned: 1 April 1932
- Decommissioned: 1947 or 1948
- Fate: Sold in 1948; later in service in the Dominican Republic Navy

General characteristics
- Class & type: Thetis-class patrol boat
- Displacement: 334 long tons (339 t) trial; 1945: 350 tons
- Length: 160 ft 9 in (49.00 m) waterline; 165 ft (50.3 m) overall
- Beam: 23 ft 9 in (7.24 m)
- Draft: 7 ft 8 in (2.34 m) trial; 1945: 10 ft (3 m)
- Propulsion: 2 × Winton Model 158 6-cylinder diesel engines, 670 hp (500 kW) each; two shafts with 3-bladed screws
- Speed: 16 knots (30 km/h)
- Range: 3,000 nautical miles (6,000 km) at 11 knots (20 km/h)
- Complement: 45 officers and men; 1945: 75 officers and men
- Sensors & processing systems: 1933: none; 1945: SF-1 radar and QCO sonar
- Armament: Prewar: 1 × 3-inch (76 mm) / 23 caliber gun; 2 × one-pounder machine guns; Wartime: 2 × 3"/50 caliber guns; 2 × 20 mm guns; 2 × K-guns; 2 × depth charge tracks; 2 × Mousetrap anti-submarine rockets

USCGC Icarus (WPC-110) was a steel-hulled, diesel-powered Thetis-class patrol boat of the United States Coast Guard that patrolled the United States East Coast during World War II. In 1942, Icarus sank the German submarine U-352 off the coast of North Carolina and took its survivors into custody as prisoners of war. U-352 was the second World War II U-boat sunk by the United States in American waters, and the first one from which survivors were taken.

== First years of service ==
Built by Bath Iron Works of Bath, Maine, Icarus was delivered on 29 March 1932 and commissioned on 1 April 1932. After a shakedown cruise, she reported to the New York Division's Special Patrol Force, where she supported the Coast Guard's efforts against rum-runners until Prohibition ended in 1933, continuing after that to perform general law enforcement duties and rescue patrols. In November 1941, with World War II nearly two years underway, the Coast Guard was transferred from the U.S. Treasury Department to the U.S. Navy.

Germany declared war on the U.S. on 11 December 1941, and Icarus was rearmed and assigned to the Eastern Sea Frontier for patrol duty off the East Coast. German U-boats quickly became a serious threat on the East Coast, sinking approximately 80 ships between January and April 1942, with U.S. defenses only managing to sink one U-boat (U-85) during that period.

== U-352 incident ==
Icarus' 3"/23-caliber gun, which was used to help sink U-352

While in Torpedo Alley, off the coast of Cape Lookout en route to Key West on 9 May 1942, Icarus picked up a contact on sonar, and a torpedo exploded nearby. Icarus anticipated the presumed U-boat's next move and dropped 5 depth charges at the site of the prior torpedo explosion. As sonar picked up a moving target again, Icarus moved to intercept, dropping two more depth charges, apparently hitting their target as bubbles were seen rising to the surface. Passing the spot again, Icarus dropped three more charges. Shortly thereafter, U-352 surfaced, and Icarus opened fire with machine guns and prepared for a ramming maneuver. When the U-boat's crew abandoned ship, Icarus ceased fire, releasing one last depth charge over U-352 as it sank beneath the water.

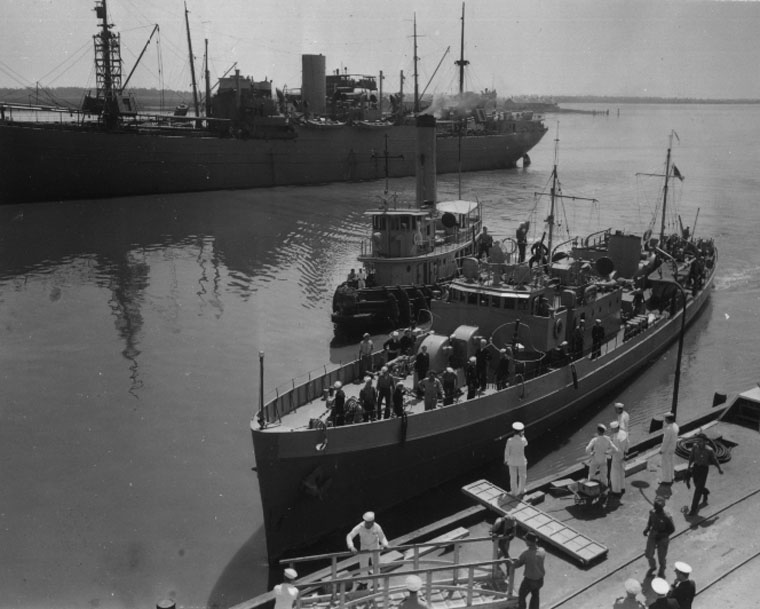
Icarus arrives at Charleston Navy Yard on 10 May 1942 to deliver prisoners from U-352.

The only U-boat previously sunk on the East Coast had gone down with all hands, and there were no standing orders concerning the rescue of survivors. Icarus had to call both Norfolk and Charleston before receiving authorization to pick up U-352's survivors. Forty minutes after the incident, Icarus picked up 33 of its crew, including U-352's commander, Kapitänleutnant Hellmut Rathke, and delivered them to the Commandant of the 6th Naval District at Charleston Navy Yard the next day.

For his actions in sinking U-352, Lieutenant Maurice D. Jester, commander of the Icarus, was awarded the Navy Cross. one of only six Coast Guard recipients of the Navy Cross during World War II.

== Later service ==
Rearmed at Norfolk Navy Yard, Icarus resumed her duties as a convoy escort, anti-submarine patroller and search and rescue ship. She was transferred to the 3rd Naval District for duty with the Air-Sea Rescue Service in 1945. On 18 October 1946 she was placed on reserve status at Stapleton, Staten Island. Icarus was decommissioned on 15 March 1948 and sold on 1 July 1948 to the Southeastern Terminal and Steamship Company. She was later transferred to the Navy of the Dominican Republic where she was renamed Independencia (P-105, later P-204). She saw combat in the Dominican Civil War in 1965, was rebuilt in 1975, and was later sent to reserve. Independencia was still listed by Jane's Fighting Ships as part of the Dominican Navy as late as 1995, but had been dropped from the list by the 1999 release.

== In media ==
- "Reunion," a 1992 episode of the PBS television series Return to the Sea, tells the story of Icarus′s sinking of U-352, includes footage of U-352′s wreck and 1992 interviews with crewmen from Icarus and U-352, and documents a memorial service for the crew of U-352 over the site of her wreck on May 9, 1992, the 50th anniversary of her sinking.
