= Maurice D. Jester =

US Coast Guard officer

Maurice Jester
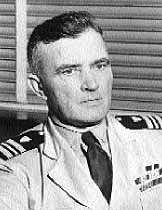
- Born: May 13, 1889; Chincoteague, Virginia
- Died: August 31, 1957 (aged 68); Chincoteague, Virginia
- Occupation: U.S. Coast Guardsman
- Known for: First captain to capture the crew of a U-boat

Maurice David Jester (May 13, 1889 – August 31, 1957) was a member of the United States Coast Guard. Jester enlisted in the Coast Guard as a surfman in 1917. By 1936, he had risen to the rank of chief boatswain. In December 1941, after the United States entered World War II, Jester was given a lieutenant's commission, and he was given command of the USCGC Icarus (WPC-110).

In 1942, Jester led the Icarus during the sinking of the German U-boat U-352, successfully rescuing surviving German crew. The U-352 was larger and better armed than the Icarus. Jester received a Navy Cross and promotion to lieutenant commander for his leadership.

Historians noted that, after sinking the U-boat, Jester had great difficulty getting instruction from his superiors as to whether or not he should rescue the crew. At first Navy HQ in Norfolk instructed him to abandon them and let them drown. He sought further instruction from the commandant of the Sixth Naval District, who ordered him to go back and rescue the survivors.

An issue of Life magazine featured an image of Jester on its cover.

For security reasons, Jester was not allowed to tell reporters details of the battle until 1943. On May 1, 1943, after he was allowed to speak to the press, The New York Times published two stories about his exploits, one of which was on its front page.

On August 24, 1944, The New York Times reported that the destroyer escort on which Jester's son Maurice, a lieutenant, was serving, had also been credited with sinking a U-boat.

== Legacy ==
In 2010, Charles "Skip" W. Bowen, who was then the Coast Guard's most senior non-commissioned officer, proposed that all the cutters in the Sentinel class be named after enlisted sailors in the Coast Guard or one of its precursor services who were recognized for their heroism. In late 2017, it was announced that a new Sentinel-class cutter, USCGC Maurice Jester (WPC-1152), would bear his name.
