= USS Roper =

Wickes-class destroyer

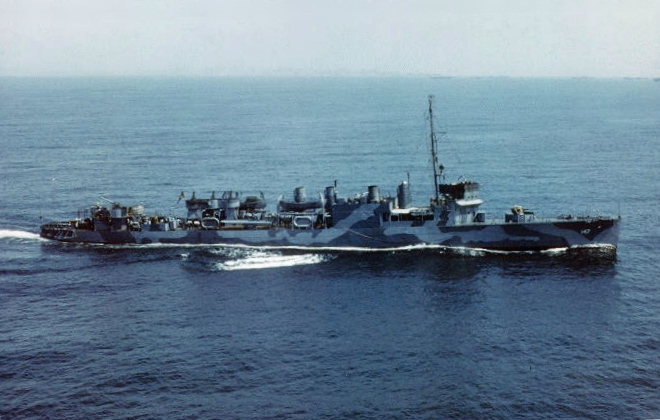
- USS Roper (DD-147)

History

United States
- Namesake: Jesse M. Roper
- Builder: William Cramp & Sons, Philadelphia
- Yard number: 462
- Laid down: 19 March 1918
- Launched: 17 August 1918
- Commissioned: 15 February 1919
- Decommissioned: 14 December 1922
- Recommissioned: 18 March 1930
- Decommissioned: 15 September 1945
- Stricken: 11 October 1945
- Fate: Sold for scrapping 31 March 1946 Scrapped December 1946

General characteristics
- Class & type: Wickes-class destroyer
- Displacement: 1,090 tons
- Length: 314 ft 5 in (95.83 m)
- Beam: 31 ft 8 in (9.65 m)
- Draft: 9 ft 10 in (3 m)
- Speed: 35 knots (65 km/h)
- Complement: 101 officers and enlisted
- Armament: 4 × 4 in (100 mm), 2 × 3 in (76 mm), 12 × 21 inch (533 mm) torpedo tubes

USS Roper (DD-147) was a Wickes-class destroyer in the United States Navy, later converted to a high-speed transport and redesignated APD-20.

She was named for Lieutenant Commander Jesse M. Roper, commanding officer of Petrel, who died in 1901 while attempting to rescue a member of his crew. As of 2016, no other ships in the United States Navy have borne this name.

== Construction ==
Roper's keel was laid down on 19 March 1918 by William Cramp & Sons, of Philadelphia. She was launched on 17 August 1918 sponsored by Mrs. Jesse M. Roper, widow of Lieutenant Commander Roper, and commissioned on 15 February 1919. Roper was the first United States Navy warship to sink a German submarine during World War II.

== Service history ==
=== Interwar period ===
Following shakedown off the New England coast, Roper sailed east in mid-June 1919 and, after stops at Ponta Delgada, Gibraltar, and Malta, anchored in the Bosporus on 5 July. For the next month she supported Peace Commission and Relief Committee work in the Black Sea area, carrying mail and passengers to and from Constantinople, Novorossisk, Batum, Samsun, and Trebizond. On 20 August the destroyer returned to the United States, at New York City, only to sail again six days later. At the end of the month she transited the Panama Canal and moved north to San Diego.

Roper remained on the West Coast until July 1921. On 23 July, she departed San Francisco, for duty on the Asiatic Station. Arriving at Cavite, Philippine Islands, on 24 August, she remained in the Philippines into December. She then moved into Chinese waters and, into the summer, operated primarily from Hong Kong and Chefoo. On 25 August 1922, she headed back to California. Routed via Nagasaki, Midway, and Pearl Harbor she arrived at San Francisco on 13 October. Two days later she shifted to San Pedro, Los Angeles, thence proceeded to San Diego, where she was decommissioned on 14 December 1922 and berthed with the Pacific Reserve Fleet.

Recommissioned on 18 March 1930, Roper resumed operations in the Pacific. Operating primarily in the southern California area, in active and rotating reserve squadrons, for the next seven years, she deployed to Panama, to Hawaii and to the Caribbean for fleet problems and maneuvers in 1931, 1933, 1935, and 1936. During 1933, Lieutenant, junior grade Robert A. Heinlein, who would later gain fame as a science fiction author, transferred aboard Roper. In 1934 he was promoted to lieutenant, then "invalided out," permanently disabled by tuberculosis. During January and February 1936, Roper moved north for operations in Alaskan waters.

In February 1937, Roper departed California and, after transiting the Panama Canal, joined the Atlantic Fleet. For the remainder of the year, through 1938, and into 1939, she conducted exercises primarily off the mid-Atlantic seaboard and, during part of each year, in the Caribbean. In November 1939, after the outbreak of World War II in Europe, she shifted from Norfolk, Virginia, to Key West, Florida, whence she patrolled the Yucatán Channel and the Florida Straits. In December, she returned to Norfolk. In January 1940, she moved south again, to Charleston, South Carolina, and in March she headed north for duty on the New England Patrol.

=== World War II ===
Through the prewar Neutrality Patrol period, Roper continued to range the waters off the East and Gulf Coasts. Off Cape Cod on 7 December 1941, it returned to Norfolk for an abbreviated availability at midmonth, and then steamed to NS Argentia, Newfoundland. In early February 1942, it completed a convoy escort run to Londonderry Port, then, in March, returned to the Norfolk area for patrol and escort duty.

Roper was one of several ships to rescue survivors of the SS City of New York that had been sunk by U-160. Desanka Mohorovic, one of the passengers, ended up giving birth in one of the lifeboats. She was picked up by Roper, and ended up naming her baby after the rescue vessel.

A month later, on the night of 13/14 April, it made contact with a surfaced U-boat off the coast of North Carolina. The ensuing chase ended with the sinking by artillery fire of U-85, a unit of the 7th U-boat Flotilla. Thus the Roper sank the first German submarine by U.S. naval forces in WWII.

According to the after-action report, the attack occurred after midnight local time after Roper closed to identify an unknown contact (U-85) and was narrowly missed by a torpedo before opening fire. The commanding officer delayed rescue operations until daybreak and after the arrival of air support from a PBY Catalina and an airship due to concern of an attack by a second U-boat. No charges were filed against the crew of Roper and 29 sailors of U-85 were buried with military honors at Hampton National Cemetery.

For their actions in sinking U-85, Destroyer Division 54 commander, Commander Stanley C. Norton, and the Roper's captain, Lieutenant commander Hamilton W. Howe, were each awarded the Navy Cross.

Former commander of German U-boat U-802 and author Helmut Schmoeckel suggested in a 2002 book that the failure of Roper to rescue the U-85 crew after they abandoned the submarine and Roper's subsequent depth charging of U-85 should be investigated. He never used the phrase war crime, as is sometimes stated, and he relied on a very inaccurate American book as his source.

On 29 April, Roper rescued 14 survivors from the British merchantman Empire Drum, which had been torpedoed and sunk by U-136 five days earlier. On 1 May, it rescued another 13 survivors from Empire Drum. They were landed at Norfolk, Virginia, that day. At the end of May, Roper began a series of coastwise escort runs, from Key West to New York, which took her into 1943. In February of that year, it shifted to Caribbean–Mediterranean convoy work and remained on that duty until October when it entered the Charleston Navy Yard for conversion to a high-speed transport.

==== Convoys escorted ====
Convoy	Escort Group	Dates	Notes
ON 63		7–13 Feb 1942	from Iceland to Newfoundland
AT 18		6–17 Aug 1942	troopships from New York City to Firth of Clyde

==== Auxiliary service ====
Reclassified and given hull classification symbol APD-20 (transport destroyer) on 20 October 1943, Roper departed Charleston in late November and trained in the Chesapeake Bay area and off the Florida coast into the new year, 1944. On 13 April, she steamed east and at the end of the month joined the 8th Fleet at Oran, Algeria. A unit of Transport Division 13, assigned to support the offensive in Italy, Roper landed units of the French Army on Pianosa on 17 June and, into July, plied between Oran and Naples and operated along the western coast of the embattled peninsula. In August, she shifted her attention to southern France. On 15 August, she arrived off that coast as part of the "Sitka" Force and landed troops on Levant Island. On 5 September she returned to Italy; resumed runs between Naples and Oran, and, in early December departed the latter port for Hampton Roads.

Arriving at Norfolk on 21 December, Roper sailed again on 29 January 1945. On transiting the Panama Canal, she reported to the Pacific Fleet, and, after stops in California and Hawaii, moved into the Mariana Islands.

===== Okinawa =====
On 11 May 1945, she departed Guam for the Ryukyu Islands. Arriving in Nakagusuku Wan on 22 May, she circled to the Hagushi anchorage off Okinawa the same day. Three days later, while on screening station off that transport area she was hit by a kamikaze attack.

Ordered back to the United States to complete repairs, she departed the Ryukyus on 6 June and reached San Pedro a month later. In August, she shifted to Mare Island, but with the cessation of hostilities repair work was halted.

== Fate ==
Decommissioned on 15 September 1945, Roper's name was stricken from the Naval Vessel Register on 11 October 1945, and her hulk was sold to the Lerner Company, Oakland, California. Removed in June 1946, she was scrapped in December 1946.

== Legacy ==
Roper's anchor is located outside of building 5 of the Massachusetts Institute of Technology campus.

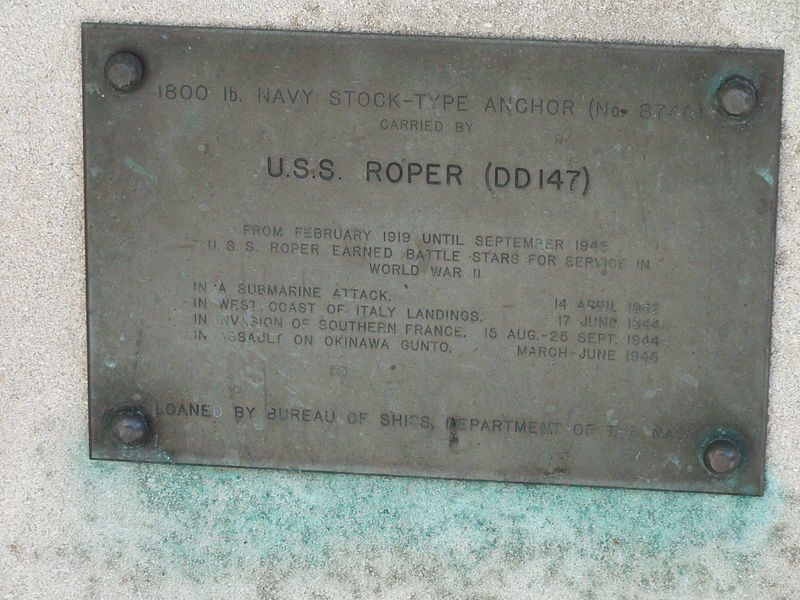
This is the anchor plaque that accompanies the USS Roper's anchor on the MIT campus.

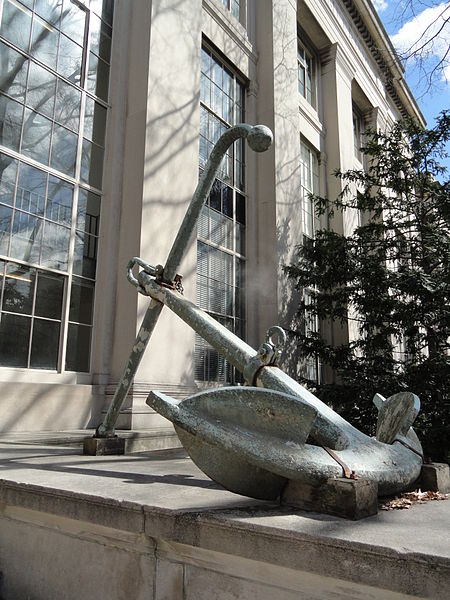
The USS Roper's Anchor on display at the MIT campus

== Awards ==
- American Defense Service Medal
- American Campaign Medal with one battle star
- European-African-Middle Eastern Campaign Medal with two battle stars
- Asiatic–Pacific Campaign Medal with one battle star
- World War II Victory Medal

Roper was one a very few U.S. Navy ships to have received battle stars in all three theaters of operations during World War II.

== Notable crew ==
- Ernest E. Evans – future MOH recipient. Served aboard Roper from 1932 to 1933 as an ensign.
- Robert A. Heinlein – served aboard Roper from 1933 to 1934 as a lieutenant.

== Bibliography ==
- Wright, C. C. (2003). "Question 40/02: Submarines Expended as Targets 1922". Warship International. XL (4): 286–298. ISSN 0043-0374.
- Wright, Christopher C. (1986). "The U.S. Fleet at the New York World's Fair, 1939: Some Photographs from the Collection of the Late William H. Davis". Warship International. XXIII (3): 273–285. ISSN 0043-0374.
