= German submarine U-352 =

German World War II submarine

- Kapitänleutnant Rathke painted this watercolor of U-352 while held as a POW.

History

Nazi Germany
- Name: U-352
- Ordered: 9 October 1939
- Builder: Flensburger Schiffbau-Gesellschaft, Flensburg
- Yard number: 471
- Laid down: 11 March 1940
- Launched: 7 May 1941
- Commissioned: 28 August 1941
- Fate: Sunk on 9 May 1942

General characteristics
- Class & type: Type VIIC submarine
- Displacement: 769 tonnes (757 long tons) surfaced; 871 t (857 long tons) submerged
- Length: 67.10 m (220 ft 2 in) o/a; 50.50 m (165 ft 8 in) pressure hull
- Beam: 6.20 m (20 ft 4 in) o/a; 4.70 m (15 ft 5 in) pressure hull
- Height: 9.60 m (31 ft 6 in)
- Draught: 4.74 m (15 ft 7 in)
- Installed power: 2,800–3,200 PS (2,100–2,400 kW; 2,800–3,200 bhp) (diesels); 750 PS (550 kW; 740 shp) (electric)
- Propulsion: 2 shafts; 2 × diesel engines; 2 × electric motors
- Speed: 17.7 knots (32.8 km/h; 20.4 mph) surfaced; 7.6 knots (14.1 km/h; 8.7 mph) submerged
- Range: 8,500 nmi (15,700 km; 9,800 mi) at 10 knots (19 km/h; 12 mph) surfaced; 80 nmi (150 km; 92 mi) at 4 knots (7.4 km/h; 4.6 mph) submerged
- Test depth: 230 m (750 ft); Crush depth: 250–295 m (820–968 ft)
- Complement: 4 officers, 40–56 enlisted
- Armament: 5 × 53.3 cm (21 in) torpedo tubes (four bow, one stern); 14 × torpedoes or 26 TMA mines; 1 × 8.8 cm (3.46 in) deck gun (220 rounds); 1 x 2 cm (0.79 in) C/30 AA gun

Service record
- Identification codes: M 00 518
- Commanders: Kptlt. Hellmut Rathke; 28 August 1941 – 9 May 1942
- Operations: 2 patrols: 1st patrol: a. 15 – 19 January 1942; b. 20 January – 26 February 1942; 2nd patrol: 7 April – 9 May 1942
- Victories: None
- U-352 (submarine) shipwreck and remains
- U.S. National Register of Historic Places
- Nearest city: Beaufort, North Carolina
- MPS: World War II Shipwrecks along the East Coast and Gulf of Mexico MPS
- NRHP reference No.: 15000804
- Added to NRHP: 12 November 2015

German submarine U-352 was a Type VIIC U-boat of Nazi Germany's Kriegsmarine during World War II. The submarine was laid down on 11 March 1940, at the Flensburger Schiffbau-Gesellschaft yard at Flensburg, launched on 7 May 1941, and commissioned on 28 August 1941, under the command of Kapitänleutnant Hellmut Rathke. She was part of the 3rd U-boat Flotilla, and was ready for front-line service by 1 January 1942.

== Design ==
German Type VIIC submarines were preceded by the shorter Type VIIB submarines. U-352 had a displacement of 769 tonnes (757 long tons) when at the surface and 871 tonnes (857 long tons) while submerged. She had a total length of 67.10 m (220 ft 2 in), a pressure hull length of 50.50 m (165 ft 8 in), a beam of 6.20 m (20 ft 4 in), a height of 9.60 m (31 ft 6 in), and a draught of 4.74 m (15 ft 7 in). The submarine was powered by two Germaniawerft F46 four-stroke, six-cylinder supercharged diesel engines producing a total of 2,800 to 3,200 metric horsepower (2,060 to 2,350 kW; 2,760 to 3,160 shp) for use while surfaced, two AEG GU 460/8–27 double-acting electric motors producing a total of 750 metric horsepower (550 kW; 740 shp) for use while submerged. She had two shafts and two 1.23 m (4 ft) propellers. The boat was capable of operating at depths of up to 230 metres (750 ft).

The submarine had a maximum surface speed of 17.7 knots (32.8 km/h; 20.4 mph) and a maximum submerged speed of 7.6 knots (14.1 km/h; 8.7 mph). When submerged, the boat could operate for 80 nautical miles (150 km; 92 mi) at 4 knots (7.4 km/h; 4.6 mph); when surfaced, she could travel 8,500 nautical miles (15,700 km; 9,800 mi) at 10 knots (19 km/h; 12 mph). U-352 was fitted with five 53.3 cm (21 in) torpedo tubes (four fitted at the bow and one at the stern), fourteen torpedoes, one 8.8 cm (3.46 in) SK C/35 naval gun, 220 rounds, and a 2 cm (0.79 in) C/30 anti-aircraft gun. The boat had a complement of between forty-four and sixty.

== Service history ==
=== First patrol ===
U-352 left Kiel on 15 January 1942, and arrived at Bergen, in Norway, on 19 January. She left the next day and patrolled south of Iceland, without success, before sailing to her new home port at Saint-Nazaire, in France, by 26 February.

=== Second patrol ===
U-352 left St. Nazaire, on 7 April 1942, and sailed across the Atlantic to the north-eastern coast of the United States. There on 9 May 1942, she was sunk by depth charges from the U.S. Coast Guard cutter Icarus, south of Morehead City, North Carolina, in position 34°13.67′N 76°33.89′W. The crew of the Icarus machine gunned the German submarine when it surfaced, preventing the German crew from manning the deck guns. One survivor, radio operator Kurt Krueger, reported in 1999 that Icarus departed and then returned 45 minutes later to pick up survivors. Fifteen of the crew were lost, but 33 survived and spent the remainder of the war as prisoners.

=== Wolfpacks ===
U-352 took part in one wolfpack, namely:

- Hecht (27 January – 4 February 1942)

== Dive site ==
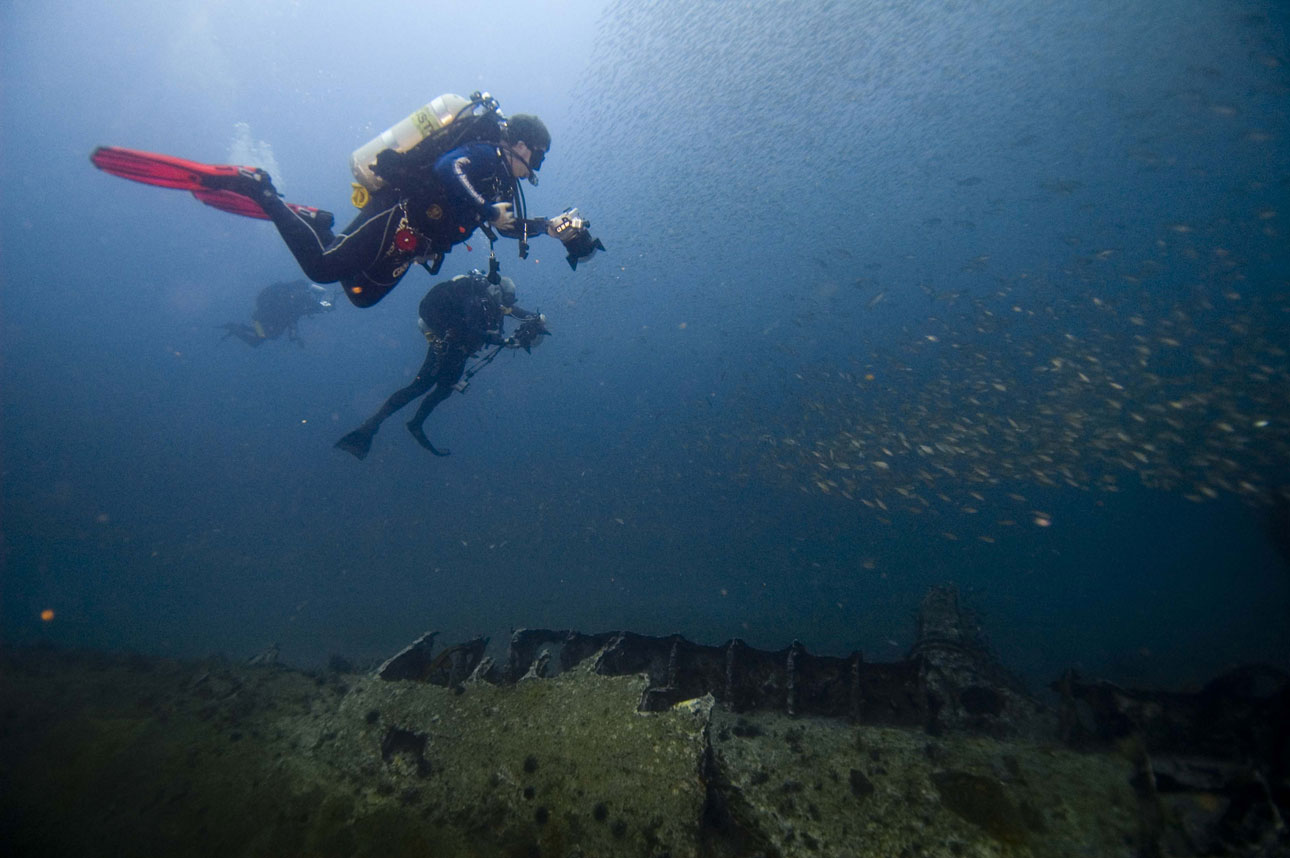
Wreck diving on the U-352 in 2008.

The wreck of U-352 was discovered 26 mi (42 km) south of Morehead City, in 1975, by George Purifoy. She lies in about 115 feet (35 m) of water, and sits at a 45-degree list to starboard. The wreck scatter is within a 100 m (330 ft) radius of location above on a sand bottom. This wreck has become an artificial reef that is heavily populated with Hemanthias vivanus. The site was listed on the National Register of Historic Places in 2015. It is a popular scuba diving spot for advanced divers. A replica of the wreck is on display at the North Carolina Aquarium at Pine Knoll Shores.

== In media ==
- "Reunion," a 1992 episode of the PBS television series Return to the Sea, tells the story of the sinking of U-352, includes footage of her wreck and 1992 interviews with crewmen from U-352 and Icarus, and documents a memorial service for the crew of U-352 over the site of her wreck on May 9, 1992, the 50th anniversary of her sinking.

== Bibliography ==
- Busch, Rainer; Röll, Hans-Joachim (1999). German U-boat commanders of World War II: a biographical dictionary. Translated by Brooks, Geoffrey. London, Annapolis, Md: Greenhill Books, Naval Institute Press. ISBN 1-55750-186-6.
- Busch, Rainer; Röll, Hans-Joachim (1999). Deutsche U-Boot-Verluste von September 1939 bis Mai 1945 [German U-boat losses from September 1939 to May 1945]. Der U-Boot-Krieg (in German). Vol. IV. Hamburg, Berlin, Bonn: Mittler. ISBN 3-8132-0514-2.
- Gröner, Erich; Jung, Dieter; Maass, Martin (1991). German Warships 1815–1945, U-boats and Mine Warfare Vessels. Vol. 2. Translated by Thomas, Keith; Magowan, Rachel. London: Conway Maritime Press. ISBN 0-85177-593-4.
