= German submarine U-85 (1941) =

German World War II submarine

Coordinates: 35°55′N 75°13′W

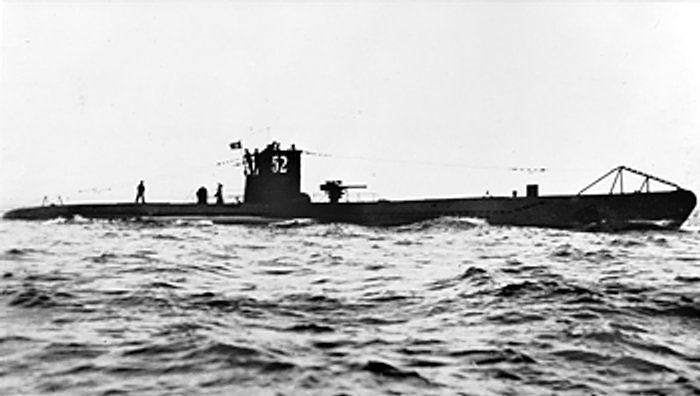
- U-52, a typical Type VIIB boat

History

Nazi Germany
- Name: U-85
- Ordered: 9 June 1938
- Builder: Flender Werke, Lübeck
- Yard number: 281
- Laid down: 18 December 1939
- Launched: 10 April 1941
- Commissioned: 7 June 1941
- Fate: Sunk near North Carolina, 14 April 1942

General characteristics
- Class & type: Type VIIB U-boat
- Displacement: 753 t (741 long tons) surfaced; 857 t (843 long tons) submerged
- Length: 66.50 m (218 ft 2 in) o/a; 48.80 m (160 ft 1 in) pressure hull
- Beam: 6.20 m (20 ft 4 in) o/a; 4.70 m (15 ft 5 in) pressure hull
- Draught: 4.74 m (15 ft 7 in)
- Installed power: 2,800–3,200 PS (2,100–2,400 kW; 2,800–3,200 bhp) (diesels); 750 PS (550 kW; 740 shp) (electric)
- Propulsion: 2 shafts; 2 × diesel engines; 2 × electric motors
- Speed: 17.9 knots (33.2 km/h; 20.6 mph) surfaced; 8 knots (15 km/h; 9.2 mph)
- Range: 8,700 nmi (16,100 km; 10,000 mi) at 10 knots (19 km/h; 12 mph) surfaced; 90 nmi (170 km; 100 mi) at 4 knots (7.4 km/h; 4.6 mph) submerged
- Test depth: 220 m (720 ft); Crush depth: 230–250 m (750–820 ft)
- Complement: 4 officers, 40–56 enlisted
- Sensors & processing systems: Gruppenhorchgerät
- Armament: 5 × 53.3 cm (21 in) torpedo tubes (four bow, one stern); 14 × torpedoes or 26 TMA mines; 1 × 8.8 cm (3.46 in) deck gun (220 rounds); 1 × 2 cm (0.79 in) C/30 anti-aircraft gun

Service record
- Identification codes: M 40 935
- Commanders: Oblt.z.S. Eberhard Greger; 7 June 1941 – 14 April 1942
- Operations: 4 patrols: 1st patrol: a. 28 August – 18 September 1941; b. 11 – 13 October 1941; 2nd patrol: 16 October – 27 November 1941; 3rd patrol: 8 January – 23 February 1942; 4th patrol: 21 March – 14 April 1942
- Victories: 3 merchant ships sunk (15,060 GRT)
- U-85 (submarine) shipwreck and remains
- U.S. National Register of Historic Places
- Nearest city: Nags Head, North Carolina
- MPS: World War II Shipwrecks along the East Coast and Gulf of Mexico MPS
- NRHP reference No.: 15000805
- Added to NRHP: 12 November 2015

German submarine U-85 was a Type VIIB U-boat of Nazi Germany's Kriegsmarine during World War II.

She was laid down at the Flender Werke in Lübeck on 18 December 1939 as yard number 281. Launched on 10 April 1941, she was commissioned on 7 June and assigned to the 3rd U-boat Flotilla under the command of Oberleutnant zur See Eberhard Greger.

U-85 conducted four war patrols with the flotilla, and sank three ships, totalling 15,060 gross register tons (GRT). She was sunk in April 1942 by the US destroyer Roper.

== Design ==
German Type VIIB submarines were preceded by the shorter Type VIIA submarines. U-85 had a displacement of 753 tonnes (741 long tons) when at the surface and 857 tonnes (843 long tons) while submerged. She had a total length of 66.50 m (218 ft 2 in), a pressure hull length of 48.80 m (160 ft 1 in), a beam of 6.20 m (20 ft 4 in), a height of 9.50 m (31 ft 2 in), and a draught of 4.74 m (15 ft 7 in). The submarine was powered by two MAN M 6 V 40/46 four-stroke, six-cylinder supercharged diesel engines producing a total of 2,800 to 3,200 metric horsepower (2,060 to 2,350 kW; 2,760 to 3,160 shp) for use while surfaced, two BBC GG UB 720/8 double-acting electric motors producing a total of 750 metric horsepower (550 kW; 740 shp) for use while submerged. She had two shafts and two 1.23 m (4 ft) propellers. The boat was capable of operating at depths of up to 230 metres (750 ft).

The submarine had a maximum surface speed of 17.9 knots (33.2 km/h; 20.6 mph) and a maximum submerged speed of 8 knots (15 km/h; 9.2 mph). When submerged, the boat could operate for 90 nautical miles (170 km; 100 mi) at 4 knots (7.4 km/h; 4.6 mph); when surfaced, she could travel 8,700 nautical miles (16,100 km; 10,000 mi) at 10 knots (19 km/h; 12 mph). U-85 was fitted with five 53.3 cm (21 in) torpedo tubes (four fitted at the bow and one at the stern), fourteen torpedoes, one 8.8 cm (3.46 in) SK C/35 naval gun, 220 rounds, and one 2 cm (0.79 in) anti-aircraft gun The boat had a complement of between forty-four and sixty.

== Service history ==
=== First patrol ===
U-85 departed Trondheim in Norway on 28 August 1941 for her first patrol. She sank the Thistleglen on 10 September northeast of Cape Farewell (Greenland).

She docked at St. Nazaire on the French Atlantic coast on 18 September.

=== Second patrol ===
U-85's second patrol started and finished in Lorient, but was unremarkable.

=== Third patrol ===
On her third foray, she sank the Empire Fusilier southeast of St. Johns, Newfoundland, after a seven-hour chase, on 9 February 1942. Nine crew members were lost.

=== Fourth patrol and loss ===
Having left St. Nazaire on 21 March 1942, U-85 sank the Norwegian freighter Christen Knudsen off the coast of New Jersey on 10 April.

=== Wolfpacks ===
U-85 took part in four wolfpacks, namely:

- Markgraf (1 – 11 September 1941)
- Schlagetot (20 October – 1 November 1941)
- Raubritter (1 – 17 November 1941)
- Störtebecker (17 – 22 November 1941)

== Sinking ==
U-85 was operating within view of Bodie Island Light at midnight on 13 April 1942 when the destroyer USS Roper detected the submarine on British Type 286 radar at a range of 2,700 yards (2,500 m). The boat attempted to run south on the surface and fired its stern torpedo as Roper closed to 700 yards (640 m). The destroyer evaded the torpedo and closed to 300 yards (270 m), when U-85 turned sharply to starboard. Roper illuminated the U-boat with its searchlight and observed men on deck near the gun whose firing arc had just been cleared by the course change. Roper raked U-85 with machine gun fire and scored a hit with a 3"/50 caliber gun. Roper then dropped a pattern of 11 depth charges, among the U-85 survivors where she had disappeared beneath the surface.

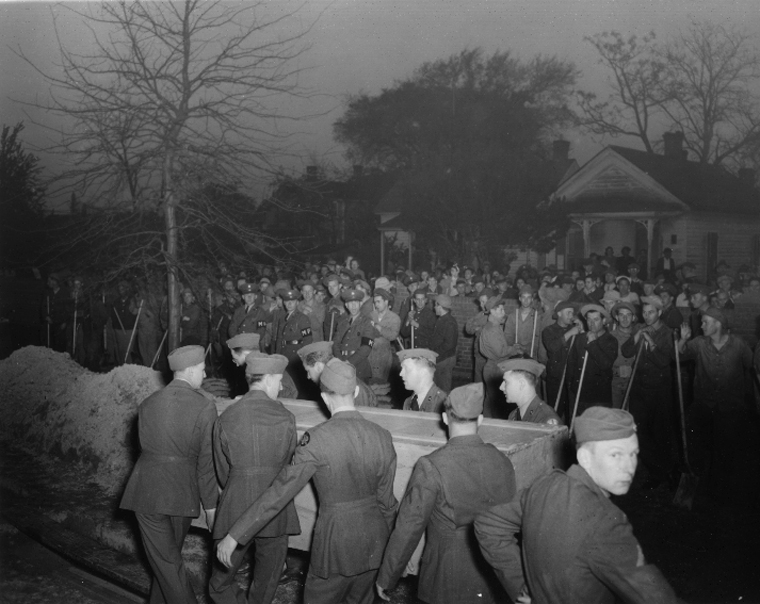
29 sailors from U-85 were buried at Hampton National Cemetery.

Numerous men were observed in the water, but no rescue attempt was made until daylight. By then, there were no survivors among the 29 bodies floating in life jackets. Some of the bodies were wearing civilian clothes, carrying wallets with United States currency and identification cards. The bodies were fingerprinted, photographed, and buried in a nighttime military ceremony at the Hampton National Cemetery. A ceremony attended by US and German military representatives is held annually at the graves to commemorate the sailors. U-85 lies in less than 100 ft (30 m) of water; the United States Navy briefly attempted to salvage her. More recent investigation by sport divers has raised questions about Navy reports on the wreck.

U-85 was the first U-boat loss of "Operation Drumbeat" (Paukenschlag), the offensive off the eastern seaboard of the United States in 1942.

For their actions in sinking U-85, the Navy Cross was awarded to the Roper's captain, Lieutenant Commander Hamilton W. Howe, and his commander, Destroyer Division 54 commander Commander Stanley C. Norton.

== Wreck ==
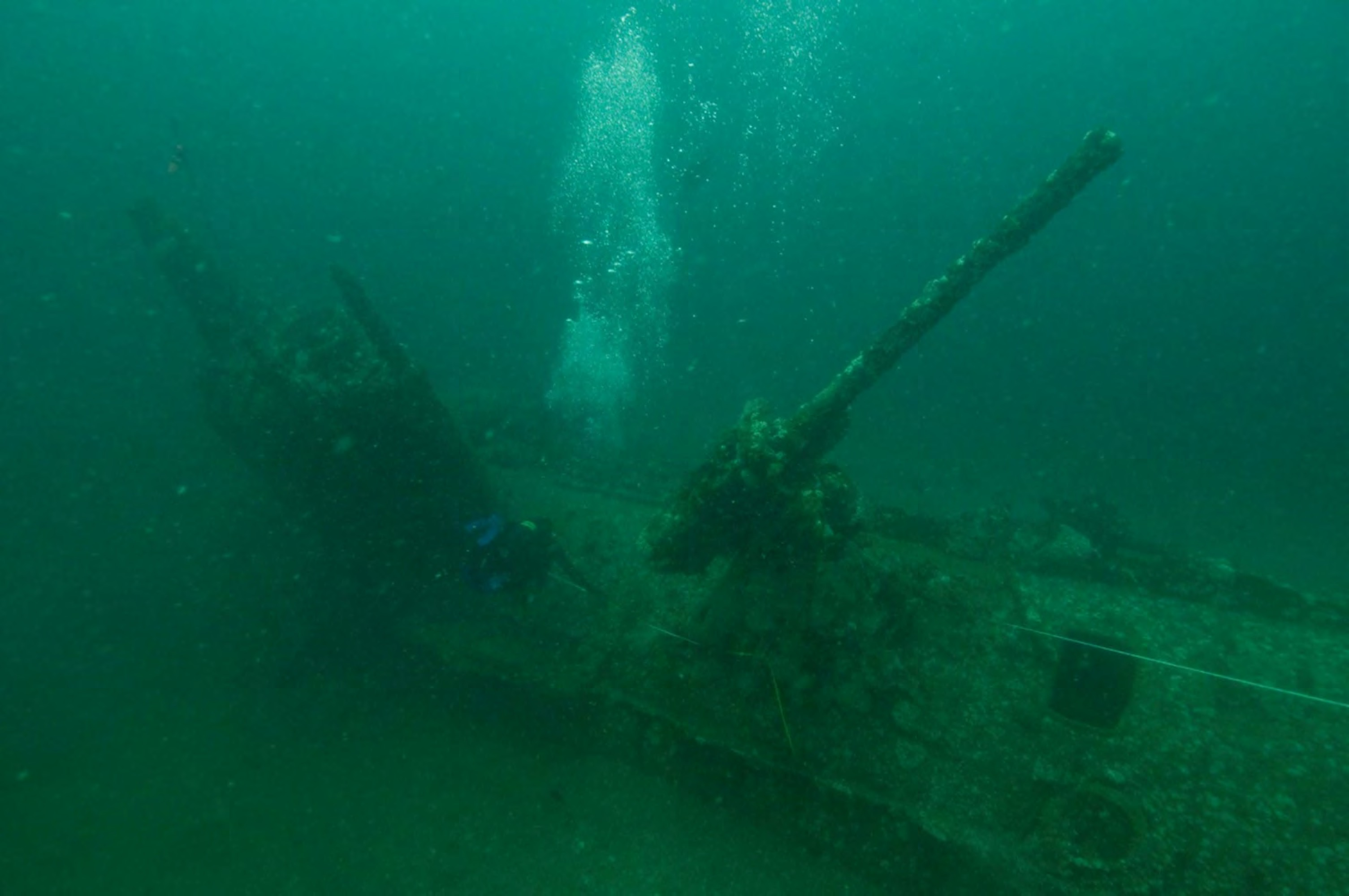
Deck gun

The hatch of U-85 is on display in the Graveyard of the Atlantic Museum; the submarine herself still serves as an attraction for divers. The Labrador current influences the site and visibility can be low. The majority of the debris lies within a 100 metres (330 ft) radius of the wreck. The wreck site was listed on the National Register of Historic Places in 2015.

The Enigma machine was recovered from the wreck by private divers (Jim Bunch, Roger & Rich Hunting) and in 2003 the German government agreed to allow the machine to be displayed at the Graveyard of the Atlantic Museum, in Hatteras, North Carolina.

== Summary of raiding history ==
Date	Ship	Nationality	Tonnage	Fate
10 September 1941	Thistleglen	United Kingdom	4,748	Sunk
9 February 1942	Empire Fusilier	United Kingdom	5,408	Sunk
10 April 1942	Chr. Knudsen	Norway	4,904	Sunk
Total amount of tonnage:			15,060 gross register tons	

== Bibliography ==
- Bishop, Chris (2006). Kriegsmarine U-Boats, 1939–45. London: Amber Books. ISBN 978-1-904687-96-2.
- Busch, Rainer; Röll, Hans-Joachim (1999a). German U-boat commanders of World War II: a biographical dictionary. Translated by Brooks, Geoffrey. London, Annapolis, Md: Greenhill Books, Naval Institute Press. ISBN 1-55750-186-6.
- Busch, Rainer; Röll, Hans-Joachim (1999b). Deutsche U-Boot-Verluste von September 1939 bis Mai 1945 [German U-boat losses from September 1939 to May 1945]. Der U-Boot-Krieg (in German). Vol. IV. Hamburg, Berlin, Bonn: Mittler. ISBN 3-8132-0514-2.
- Hickam, Homer "Torpedo Junction" Naval Institute Press
- Gröner, Erich; Jung, Dieter; Maass, Martin (1991). German Warships 1815–1945, U-boats and Mine Warfare Vessels. Vol. 2. Translated by Thomas, Keith; Magowan, Rachel. London: Conway Maritime Press. ISBN 0-85177-593-4.
