= USCGC Triton (WPC-116) =

Ferryboat, former patrol boat

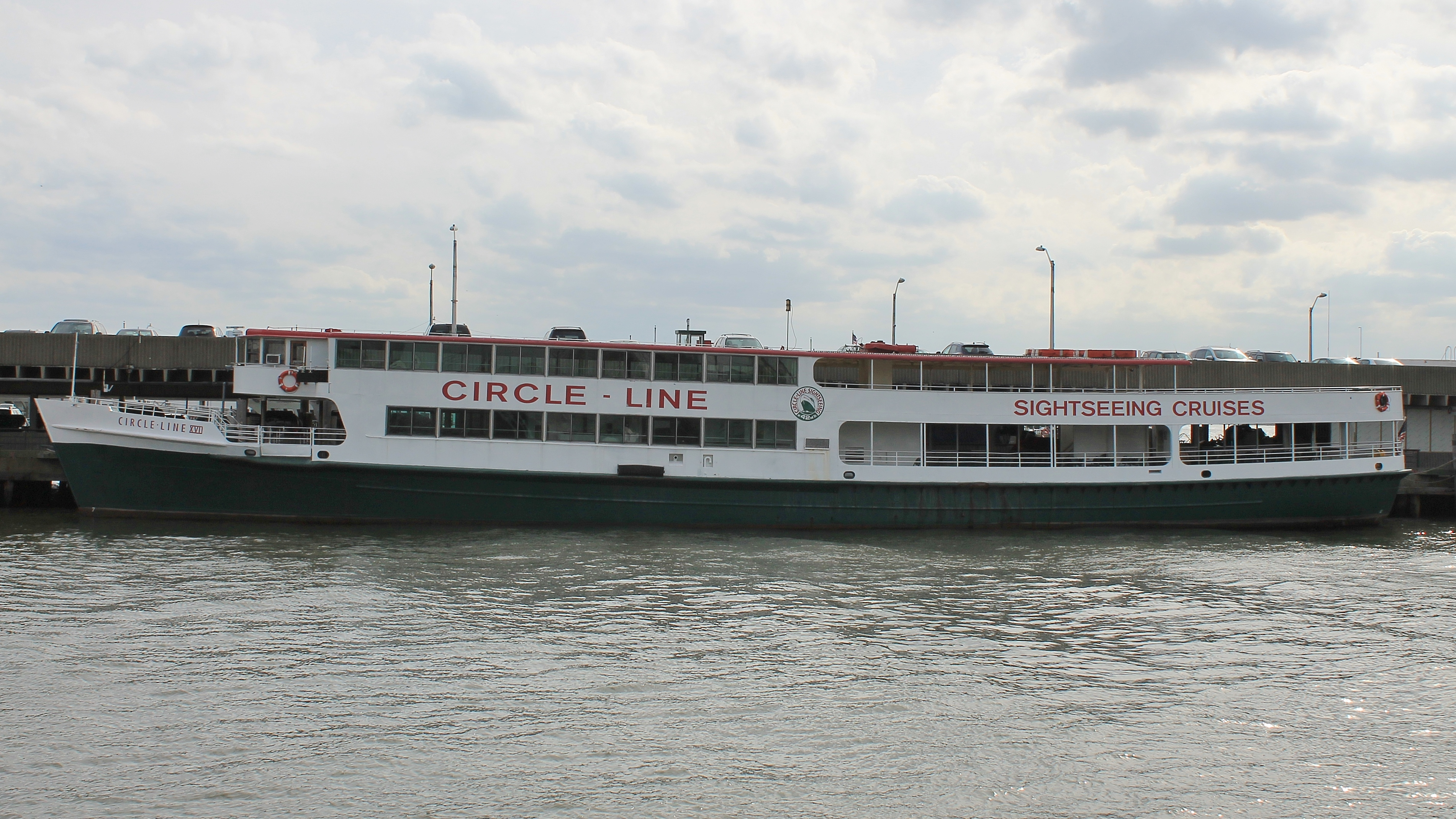
- Triton as Circle Line XVII in 2016.

History

United States
- Name: Triton
- Ordered: 17 November 1933
- Completed: 1934
- Commissioned: 20 November 1934
- Decommissioned: 1967
- Fate: Repowered and converted to passenger vessel for Circle Line in New York City in 1973

United States
- Name: Circle Line XVII
- Owner: Circle Line Sightseeing Cruises
- Acquired: 1973
- Identification: MMSI number: 366957240; Callsign: WYS6549
- Status: In service

General characteristics
- Class & type: Thetis-class patrol boat
- Displacement: 337 long tons (342 t)
- Length: 165 ft (50 m)
- Beam: 25 ft 3 in (7.70 m)
- Draft: 8 ft 6 in (2.59 m)
- Speed: 16 kn (30 km/h; 18 mph)
- Complement: 50
- Armament: 1 × 3-in gun; 2 × 1-pounders

USCGC Triton (WPC-116), a steel-hulled, diesel-powered Thetis-class patrol boat of the United States Coast Guard, was the fourth commissioned ship of the United States to be named for Triton, a Greek demigod of the sea who was the son of Poseidon and Amphitrite. She served almost simultaneously with the submarine of the same name. Today, she serves as a tour boat in New York City for Circle Line Sightseeing Cruises, and carries the name Circle Line XVII.

== History ==
=== Coast Guard service ===
The contract for her construction was let on 17 November 1933 to the Marietta Manufacturing Company, Point Pleasant, West Virginia. She was commissioned as Coast Guard Patrol Boat No. 16 on 20 November 1934.

Assigned to the homeport of Gulfport, Mississippi, Triton operated in the Gulf of Mexico from at least 1 January 1935. On 1 July 1941, four months in advance of the directive whereby the United States Coast Guard was transferred from the United States Department of the Treasury to the United States Navy, Triton and five of her sister ships were turned over to the Navy. This action occurred simultaneously with the establishment of the four Sea Frontiers.

Four Thetis-class patrol boats, including Triton, were assigned to the East Coast Sound School, Key West, Florida, for duty as patrol and training vessels. Their collateral duties included operating under the aegis of Commander, Task Force 6, on Gulf patrol duties.

==== World War II ====
At the time of the Japanese attack on Pearl Harbor, 7 December 1941, Triton was operating out of Key West. In or around February 1942, Triton was classified as a patrol craft and given the hull classification symbol WPC-116.

Although American warships had been actively engaged in patrol and escort missions in the Battle of the Atlantic even before Pearl Harbor, their techniques for combating the dangerous German U-boats were, in January and February 1942, still far from adequate. U-boats operating off the eastern seaboard experienced what they called "the happy time," before American convoys could be organized. In some cases, Allied ships would be sunk because they were silhouetted by lights in non-blacked out cities along the shoreline.

Triton's antisubmarine warfare (ASW) training missions were conducted along with local patrol and escort duties out of Key West from 1941 into 1945. She had her first brush with what she presumed to be an enemy submarine on 21 February 1942. On that day, she made one attack but without success. Over the next few days, upon occasion joined by PC-445 and Hamilton, Triton conducted more attacks but did not make any strikes.

On 9 June 1942, when SS Lake Ormoc reported an enemy submarine on the surface in her vicinity, Triton directed Thetis to make the search. Triton, meanwhile, contacted the submarine R-10 which had been conducting exercises with the patrol vessels in that same area. When PC-518 took over the job of escorting R-10 back to Key West, Florida, Triton joined Thetis in search of the submarine. Eventually, PC-518 and Noa joined the hunt. Triton attacked with depth charges but, after a further search, concluded that the target was probably a tidal rip in the Gulf Stream, not a submarine.

Triton's next recorded ASW operation came soon thereafter, during the concentrated search and destroy mission mounted to find the U-boat which torpedoed the American steamer SS Hagan on the night of 10 June. The hunt, which involved radar-equipped United States Army Air Forces B-18 Bolo bombers, three destroyers, several PCs, and Triton and Thetis, took three days. On 12 June, in an area well known for false contacts, Triton attacked what she thought to be a submarine but later evaluated to be otherwise. Later that day, although not picking up propeller noises, the contact seemed strong to Triton's sonar operator, and the ship attacked. Again, the result was the same—negative.

The next day, however, was different. Thetis picked up U-157 trying to escape the "dragnet" and destroyed her in a single depth charge attack. That patrol craft recovered two pairs of leather submariner's pants and a tube of lubricant marked "made in Düsseldorf." There were no survivors. Triton took part in further attacks, along with the other ships of the hunter-killer group based on Key West; but, by that point, the enemy submersible had already been killed.

Triton remained with the Sound School, apparently, into 1945. On 10 February, while PC-1546 was engaged in "Robot Bomb Patrol," she picked up what she evaluated as a submarine contact. She and Triton, also in the vicinity, then conducted attacks but found no evidence that a kill had been made.

==== Post World War II ====
Triton apparently remained in the Gulf of Mexico region for the remainder of her active service in the Coast Guard. Reverting to Treasury Department control after the end of World War II, Triton was reclassified from WPC-116 to WMEC-116 (Medium Endurance Cutter) sometime in 1966. Her post-war duty station was at Corpus Christi, Texas, until 1967.

=== Tour ship ===
She was sold as government surplus and converted into a twin-deck passenger excursion vessel for Circle Line Sightseeing in New York City. Her two Winton 158-6 direct-drive diesels were replaced with two quad sets of four GM 6-71 diesels per shaft. Her electrical system was converted to AC with two 60 kW generators each powered by a GM 6-71. She has been a passenger excursion vessel named Circle Line XVII since 1973 and is still running as of March 2016.

== Awards ==
- American Defense Service Medal with "Fleet" clasp
- American Campaign Medal
- World War II Victory Medal
- National Defense Service Medal with star
