= USCGC Dione =

American patrol boat and merchant ship (1934–1992)

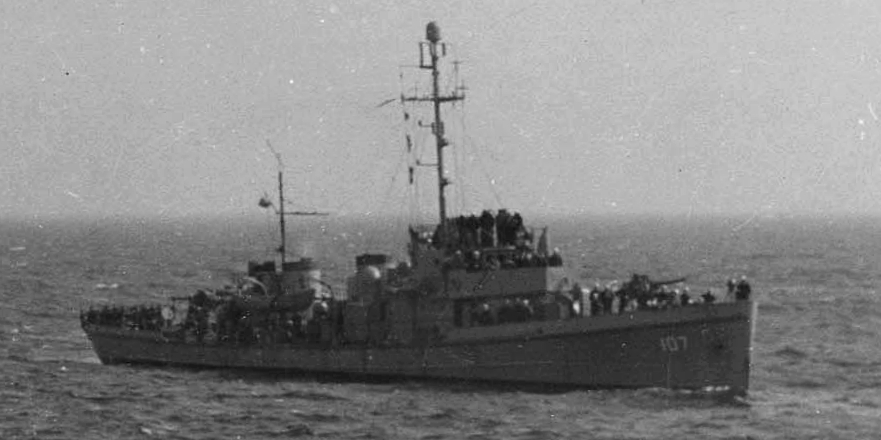
- USCGC Dione on 17 May 1945

History

United States
- Name: Dione
- Namesake: Dione
- Builder: Manitowoc Shipbuilding Corporation
- Laid down: 10 November 1933
- Launched: 30 June 1934
- Sponsored by: Unita Risch
- Commissioned: 5 October 1934
- Decommissioned: 23 July 1947
- Delivered: 28 September 1934
- Recommissioned: 4 February 1951
- Decommissioned: 8 February 1963
- Cost: US$258,000
- Yard number: Building number: P-13; Hull number: 277
- In service: 1934–1947; 1951–1963
- Home port: Norfolk, Virginia (1934–1943; 1945–1947); Tompkinsville, Staten Island (1943–1944); Freeport, Texas (1952–1963)
- Identification: Designation: P-13 (assigned 1934); WPC-107 (assigned 1942); Signal letters: NRGV
- Fate: Sold as a supply ship on 24 February 1964

General characteristics 1933 construction
- Class & type: Thetis-class patrol boat
- Displacement: 337 long tons (342 t)
- Length: 165 ft (50 m) overall; 160 ft (49 m) between perpendiculars
- Beam: 25 ft 3 in (7.70 m) maximum; 23 ft 9 in (7.24 m) at waterline
- Draft: 7 ft 8 in (2 m)
- Decks: 2 (main deck and berth deck)
- Installed power: 2 × Winton, 6 cyl., Model 158 diesels; 1,340 hp (1,000 kW)
- Propulsion: 2 × three-bladed propellers
- Speed: 16 kn (30 km/h; 18 mph) (maximum)
- Range: 1,750 statute miles (2,820 km) (maximum sustained speed)
- Boats & landing craft carried: 2 × 19 ft (5.8 m) dories
- Capacity: 7,700 US gal (29,000 L; 6,400 imp gal)
- Complement: 5 officers, 39 men
- Sensors & processing systems: Wireless telegraphy; World War I-era sonar
- Armament: 1 × 3-inch/23 gun; 2 × 1 lb (0.45 kg) guns

General characteristics 1941 or 1942 rearm (Note: Homer Hickam's Torpedo Junction states that the rearmament took place in May 1942, but the Coast Guard website entry for Dione says it took place sometime in 1941.)
- Armament: 1 × 3-inch/23 gun; 2 × depth charge tracks; 1 × Y-gun depth charge launcher

General characteristics 1945 refit
- Displacement: 350 long tons (360 t)
- Draft: 10 ft (3 m)
- Complement: 7 officers, 68 enlisted
- Sensors & processing systems: SF radar; QCN-1 sonar
- Armament: 2 × 3-inch/50 guns; 2 × 20 mm/80 guns; 2 × depth charge tracks; 2 × Mousetrap anti-submarine rocket launchers; 2 × Y-gun depth charge launchers

USCGC Dione (WPC-107) was a Thetis-class patrol boat operated by the United States Coast Guard from 1934 to 1963. She and the other members of the class were designed to enforce Prohibition in the United States by stopping the smuggling of alcohol. Built by the Manitowoc Shipbuilding Corporation in Manitowoc, Wisconsin, Dione was laid down in November 1933, launched in June 1934, and was commissioned into service in October. Prohibition was repealed in December 1933, so the cutter had no use in her planned capacity; she instead conducted search and rescue operations out of her station in Norfolk, Virginia. She was assigned to patrol duty off Virginia and North Carolina after the start of World War II.

At the outbreak of the Second Happy Time in January 1942, (Note: The event was called "happy" by German officers rather than Americans ones, due to their successes of sinking Allied merchant ships with minimal German losses.) Dione became the only large ship in the Fifth Naval District capable of opposing German U-boats. The cutter patrolled the waters off North Carolina, which were nicknamed "Torpedo Alley" due to the high concentration of U-boats operating there. From January to June 1942, she rescued survivors of torpedoed ships, escorted Allied convoys, and hunted U-boats—though the cutter never sank one. In 1945, Dione was transferred to New England with two sister ships to escort surrendered U-boats to American ports. The only escorted submarine was U-1228, which was brought to Portsmouth, New Hampshire in May.

After the war, Dione served out of Norfolk until she was decommissioned in July 1947 due to a lack of personnel. She was recommissioned in February 1951, and became the first Coast Guard Cutter to be stationed in Freeport, Texas. She operated in the Gulf of Mexico, serving in a search and rescue capacity until she was once more decommissioned in February 1963. The cutter was placed in reserve for about a year before being sold as a supply ship in February 1964.

Dione was operated as a merchant ship in the Gulf Coast region by three companies and under four different names: Dione, Big Trouble, Delta I, and Al Rashid. In April 1969, Delta I caught fire while underway in the Caribbean Sea, and only her hull was salvaged. The ship was rebuilt and underway by March 1970. She last seen in service in 1992, owned by Sabik Inc and named Al Rashid. Her combined military and civilian service lasted 58 years.

== Development ==
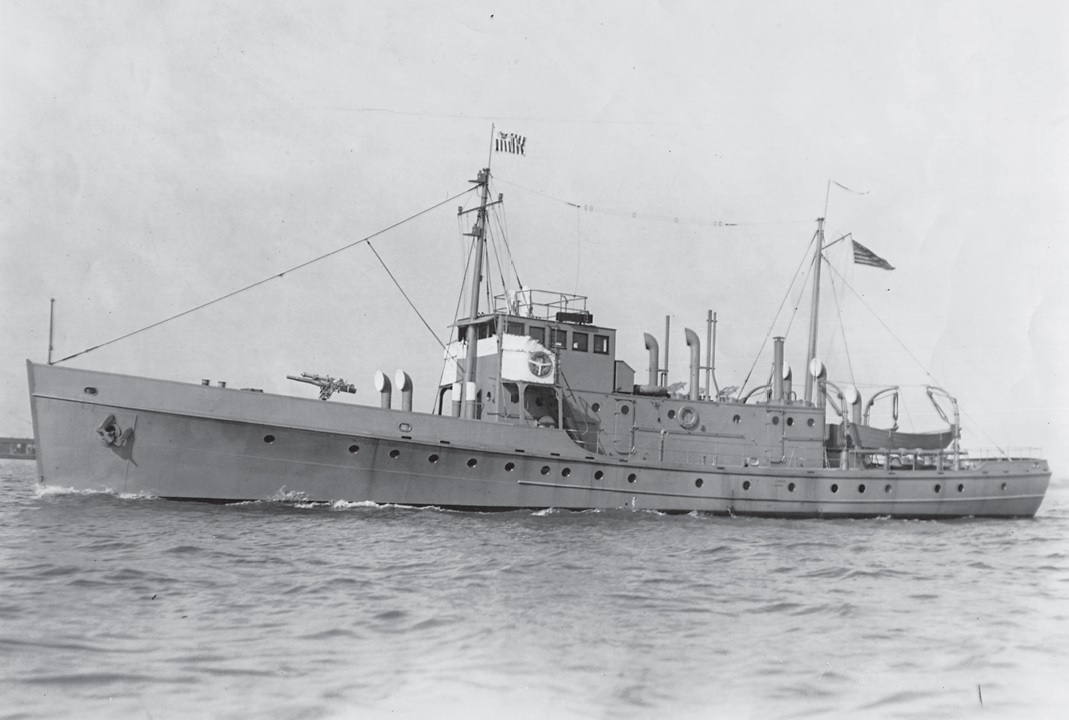
USCGC Jackson in 1927. She was a member of the 125-foot (38 m) Active-class of patrol boats that preceded the Thetis class.

The Eighteenth Amendment to the United States Constitution, ratified on 16 January 1919, prohibited the "manufacture, sale, or transportation" of intoxicating liquors. It took effect one year later on 17 January 1920 alongside its enabling legislation, the Volstead Act, which began the period of Prohibition in the United States. The Volstead Act was enforced by local police departments, the Bureau of Prohibition, the United States Customs Service and the Department of the Treasury via the Coast Guard. The Coast Guard's roles were to protect life and property at sea, maintain military readiness, and counteract seaborne smuggling.

For the first four years of prohibition, the Coast Guard treated enforcement as a secondary duty compared to its other tasks, and operated about 30 cutters large enough to operate at sea. By 1924, it began to dedicate more resources to intercept smugglers but was quickly overwhelmed and able to only intercept an estimated 5% of smuggled alcohol. That year, it was supplemented with old destroyers and minesweepers on loan from the US Navy. While the older vessels helped fill gaps off the coast as a stop-gap measure, they were expensive to operate and performed poorly. The Coast Guard then began to build a fleet of purpose-built patrol boats for Prohibition enforcement. These cutters varied in size and capability and were used to create a continuous buffer of enforcement that stretched from the open ocean to inner harbors.

A common tactic by smugglers was to use large, seagoing, mother ships that loitered off the coast and supplied alcohol to smaller boats; those craft then brought the alcohol ashore. The Coast Guard ordered the construction of the 125 ft (38 m)-long Active class cutters in the 1920s to trail and intercept mother ships, and the experience was used to develop the next class of sea-going cutters. The 165-foot (50 m) "B"-class was the Thetis class. It was called the "B" class to differentiate it from the 165-foot "A" class, which referred to the Algonquin class of patrol boats. The Thetis class was ordered in the 1930s and designed based on results of the Active class's experiences. The design was intended to balance speed, seaworthiness, range, radio equipment, and armament along with inshore and offshore operations. Eighteen Thetis-class cutters were built.

The Eighteenth Amendment was repealed on 5 December 1933 with the Twenty-first Amendment—a little under a year before Dione was commissioned. The cutter never operated in the capacity that she and her sister ships were constructed for: enforcing Prohibition in the United States.

== Construction ==
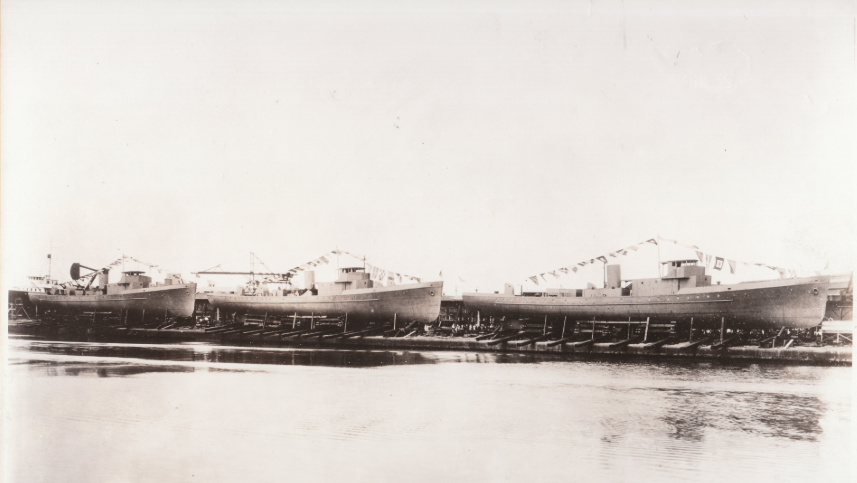
Dione (left) on the ways, alongside her sister ships Electra and Pandora

A close-up of Dione

Originally designated Patrol Boat 13 (building number P-13), with the hull number 277, the cutter was built by the Manitowoc Shipbuilding Corporation in Manitowoc, Wisconsin, and would later be named Dione. The cutter's keel was laid down on 10 November 1933, and her contract was entered the same day with a price of US$242,800. The launch of Dione and two of her sister ships, Electra and Pandora, was originally to occur on 23 June 1934; the chief government inspector and shipyard officials postponed it by one week. Dione was finally launched alongside her sister ships on 30 June, each cutter leaving the ways in intervals of twenty minutes beginning at 1100. Dione was christened by Unita Risch, president of Wisconsin Department of the American Legion Auxiliary. Champagne, rather than sparkling water, was used to christen the cutter for the first time in a ship's launching in Manitowoc since Prohibition; it was also the first time that three vessels of that size had been launched broadside at one time. Around 10,000 people attended the triple launching.

As the first of the three Thetis-class cutters in Manitowoc to be completed, Dione was delivered on 28 September and then undertook her sea trials. The cutter was proclaimed satisfactory at her trials and was commissioned on 5 October. She was named for Dione, a Titaness and the mother of the goddess Aphrodite in Greek mythology. Dione cost US$258,000 to construct. The cutter's signal letters were NRGV.

== Design and specifications ==
General arrangement plans of a Thetis-class patrol boat. Depicted are the berth deck, main deck, and two layers of superstructure.

Dione had a length overall of 165 feet (50 m), a length between perpendiculars of 160 feet (49 m), a maximum beam of 25 ft 3 in (7.70 m), and a beam at waterline of 23 ft 9 in (7.24 m). When she was constructed in 1933, the cutter had a draft of 7 ft 8 in (2 m). Her displacement was 337 long tons (342 tonnes) while fully loaded. She had a complement of 5 officers and 39 men. Her hull was made of steel.

A 3"/23-caliber gun aboard Dione's sister ship Icarus

The Thetis-class patrol boats had two decks: the main deck and berth deck. The latter was subdivided into compartments by six transverse watertight bulkheads. The forwardmost spaces were the chain locker and bosun's store, (Note: The bosun's store was a room used to store paints and oils.) which were located foward of the shared enlisted quarters. Immediately aft of the enlisted quarters were four staterooms for the cutter's five officers, followed by the fuel tanks with a fuel capacity of 7,700 U.S. gallons (29,000 L) of diesel fuel. These fuel tanks were subdivided by two bulkheads. Aft of the tanks was the engine room, followed by separate enlisted and officer messrooms further aft. On the main deck was a two-layered superstructure, which consisted of the deckhouse and pilot house. The deckhouse—the bottom layer of the superstructure—held the cutter's heads, the radio room, and the captain's quarters. Atop the deckhouse was the pilot house, an auxiliary diesel generator, three 18 in (46 cm) searchlights, and two 1-pounder guns on either side of the pilot house. Mounted on the bow was a 3-inch/23-caliber gun supplied by a magazine located in the keel below the bow. Behind the superstructure were two funnels. On both sides of the aft funnel were the cutter's boats, which were 19 ft (5.8 m) dories.

The cutters were propelled by two Winton 6-cylinder, 4-stroke diesel engines. Each engine developed 670 brake horsepower (500 kW) brake horsepower at 450 rpm and had a cylinder bore of 14 in (36 cm) and a stroke of 16 in (41 cm), for a total of 1,340 brake horsepower (1,000 kW). The engines turned two three-bladed propellers. The cutters had a maximum speed of 16 knots (30 km/h; 18 mph), a maximum sustained speed of 14 knots (26 km/h; 16 mph), a cruising speed of 11 knots (20 km/h; 13 mph), and an economic speed of 6 knots (11 km/h; 6.9 mph). They had a range of 1,750 statute miles (2,820 km) (Note: A statute mile is the same as a regular mile; it is referred to as such to differentiate it from the nautical mile.) while traveling at their maximum sustained speed, a range of 3,000 statute miles (4,800 km) while traveling at her cruising speed, and a range of 6,417 statute miles (10,327 km) while traveling at her economic speed.

== Coast Guard service ==
=== Pre-war ===
Dione departed Manitowoc the same day she was commissioned—5 October 1934. She passed through the Great Lakes and docked in Ogdensburg, New York, for repairs to her oil purifier on 15 October. The cutter traveled up through the St. Lawrence River and through the Gulf of St. Lawrence. Dione stopped in Philadelphia on 30 October to be outfitted with her weaponry, (Note: Dione could not be fitted with her weapons in Manitowoc due to a treaty with Canada that forbade the construction of warships on the Great Lakes.) and docked at the Coast Guard base on the Elizabeth River on 1 November in order to take on fuel and provisions.

Dione was stationed in Norfolk, Virginia. The cutter primarily operated in a search and rescue capacity, responding to vessels that had signaled that they were in distress, taking injured seamen to Norfolk, and locating the wreckage of downed planes. She also operated in various miscellaneous capacities, such as breaking through ice to allow ships access to the Smith and Tangier Islands in February 1936 and accompanying vessels participating in a Hampton One-Design race in August 1941. In November 1937, Dione joined the search for survivors of the sunken cargo ship Tzenny Chandris, which had sunk in a storm off Hatteras, North Carolina, on the night of 12–13 November. Multiple lifeboats were found empty, but 15 survivors were eventually found clinging to wreckage by the cutter Mendota and were subsequently taken to Norfolk.

=== World War II ===
Following the beginning of World War II, (Note: World War II began in September 1939, though the US only entered in December 1941.) Dione was assigned to both the Fifth Naval District—which contained the waters off Virginia and North Carolina—and the Eastern Sea Frontier, a Navy operational command. She was based out of Naval Operating Base Norfolk. Dione was ordered to conduct patrol duty of the waters between Norfolk and Morehead City, North Carolina, covering the shipping lanes that passed by the Outer Banks of North Carolina and going as far out as the Gulf Stream. She also traveled to the lightships that operated off the Outer Banks to deliver and receive mail. On 1 November 1941, President Franklin D. Roosevelt signed Executive Order 8929, which transferred control of the Coast Guard from the Department of the Treasury to the Navy "for the duration of the emergency." According to the United States Coast Guard, the cutter's two 1 lb (0.45 kg) guns were removed in 1941. Installed were two racks to hold depth charges and a Y-gun depth charge launcher, which was designed to throw depth charges over the sides of the cutter and into the water.

==== Second Happy Time (1942) ====
This map shows the waters of the Fifth Naval District off North Carolina and Virginia which Dione patrolled during the Second Happy Time

The waters off the Outer Banks of North Carolina are nicknamed the "Graveyard of the Atlantic" due to the high number of ships lost at sea off the coast. The sandbars shift due to rough waves and unpredictable weather. During World War II, this region also earned the additional nickname "Torpedo Alley" (alternatively Torpedo Junction) due to the high number of U-boats patrolling off the Outer Banks. During the time period that lasted from January to June 1942 and was referred to as the "Second Happy Time" by Kriegsmarine officers as well as Karl Dönitz—Admiral of the Kriegsmarine and in charge of U-boats, 397 Allied ships were sunk by U-boats. Adolphus Andrews, the rear admiral in charge of the Eastern Sea Frontier, compiled a group of twenty ships to help defend the East Coast of the United States. This consisted of Dione, six Active-class patrol boats, four 110-foot (34 m) cruiser submarines built before World War I, three Eagle-class subchasers, two gunboats from 1905, and four large yachts that had been converted for military service. In addition to being the fastest vessel of the fleet, Dione was the only one that was large enough to be capable of opposing the U-boats that operated in Torpedo Alley.

===== January–February =====
Dione was under the command of Lieutenant Nelson McCormick at the start of the Second Happy Time in January 1942. McCormick came to the conclusion that Dione was too far away from ships, when they issued distress signals, to be able to assist them. Thus, he ordered his crew to conduct more aggressive and offensive patrols. After determining that U-boats generally attacked at night, McCormick decided to abandon his usual routine in favor of grid-searching the waters off the Outer Banks for U-boats; these searches utilized a World War I-era sonar system and other types of sound-detection gear.

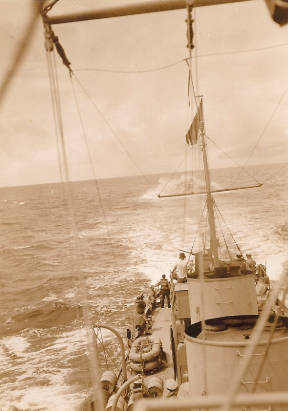
Dione deploying depth charges, 1942

At the end of January, Dione dropped six depth charges after her sonar operator reported an underwater object 20 miles (32 km) off Oregon Inlet. Two airplanes made several runs on a rapidly spreading patch of oil. They reported to McCormick that they saw something long and narrow. An oar and a boat hook eventually surfaced from the object, and when brought aboard were found to have been from the shipwreck of Francis E. Powell, an oil tanker sunk by U-130 on 27 January. In early February, Dione was ordered to Little Creek Section Base to pick up a new master, Lieutenant James Alger. McCormick was kept aboard Dione as the executive officer, and to command the cutter when intricate maneuvers were required. The Coast Guard did not explain the reassignment. On Alger's first day, Dione's sonar operator called out two echoes; the second resulted in Alger giving an order to drop depth charges. Two life rafts were dispatched to collect samples of oil that bubbled to the surface. It was then discovered that Dione had dropped depth charges on a sunken oil tanker. On 12 February, the cutter's sonar operator reported a periscope off Dione's port side. Alger ordered general quarters and had depth charges dropped from both the Y-gun and the racks that detonated at a deoth of either 100 feet (30 m) or 50 feet (15 m). Dione's lights and equipment abruptly went dead after her propellers came out of the water. The cutter's engines were stopped, and her electrical power was later restored. No U-boat was ever spotted.

Later that month, on 19 February, the cutter towed the minesweeper USS Paramount to Morehead City after she had been grounded at the entrance to Ocracoke Inlet. Dione set off for Cape Henry late at night on 27 February to assist the torpedoed freighter North Sea. The freighter was found by Dione early the next morning. Reportedly, a U-boat's attack on North Sea had been halted due to a storm that had tossed the U-boat about, preventing it from accurately aiming its deck gun and shelling the freighter. Dione towed the damaged freighter to Little Creek, as North Sea had lost her steering capabilities in the attack, and arrived by the end of the day. In February 1942, the Thetis-class patrol boats were issued alpha-numeric designations that began with WPC—PC stood for patrol craft, and the W marked that they were part of the Coast Guard. Dione was issued the designation WPC-107.

===== March–April =====
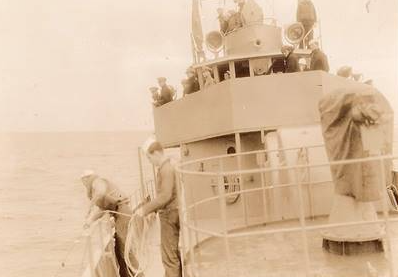
Dione's crew rescuing that of a torpedoed ship, 1942

On 15 March, Dione received a distress signal from the oil tanker Australia. The tanker had been torpedoed by U-332 about 20 miles (32 km) away from the cutter. Dione spotted Australia just over an hour after receiving the call, and the cutter's sonar operator had picked up an echo from the U-boat within two. Dione launched depth charges but had no success. Dione rescued the crew of the storage tanker Acme early in the morning of 18 March. The tanker had been torpedoed by U-124 one nautical mile (1.9 km; 1.2 mi) west of the Diamond Shoals Light Buoy just before midnight the previous day. The cutter also picked up the survivors of the freighter Kassandra Louloudis, which had been torpedoed by the same U-boat that attacked Acme just after midnight on 18 March. The cutter took the survivors of both ships to Norfolk. On 20 March, Dione's sonar made contact with a U-boat. A Coast Guard airplane from the Elizabeth City Air Station dropped two depth charges. On 23 March, she responded to the distress signals of the oil tanker Naeco, torpedoed by U-124. The cutter rescued at least ten survivors from a lifeboat and two more from the water, all of whom were taken to Norfolk. Three days later, on 26 March, the crew of Dione spotted flames from the oil tanker Dixie Arrow and traveled several miles to investigate. The tanker's survivors had already been rescued by the destroyer USS Tarbell, and the cutter encountered nothing but debris. Dione then headed south to the waters off Hatteras, North Carolina. On 5 April, the cutter responded to the torpedoed oil tanker Byron D. Benson, and pulled one survivor from the water. On 7 April, U-552 torpedoed the oil tanker British Splendour. Dione dropped depth charges on the U-boat which reportedly almost hit, though U-552 managed to escape.

Dione escorting a convoy, 1942; her Y-gun can be seen behind the sailor in the foreground

Dione rendezvoused with the destroyer USS Dickerson on 14 April, near the Diamond Shoals Light Buoy, to escort a convoy. Lieutenant Dick Bacchus had taken over as the cutter's navigator and executive officer, arriving on 11 April from USCGC Modoc; Alger remained aboard as the commander. The convoy was later joined by another cutter, and escorted two freighters north past North Carolina. After Dickerson relieved both cutters of duty, Dione headed back south for a nightly patrol. On the morning of 15 April, the cutter met up with Dickerson once more to escort a convoy, this time consisting of two British trawlers, two American tankers, and an American freighter. The tankers were quicker than the cutter, and she had issues keeping up. Alger chose to be aggressive despite the fact that the cutter was supposed to remain close by the convoy, ranging out and dropping depth charges on any suspected echoes to "keep the U-boat[s] off balance." For the next few days, Dione escorted convoys during the day and patrolled the waters for U-boats during the night. The convoys were nicknamed "bucket brigades" after the old-fashioned method of transporting buckets during a fire. These convoys traveled during the day and then docked in ports overnight; this was possible on the East Coast due to its abundance of good harbors. No ships were lost to U-boats near Cape Hatteras or Cape Lookout after the establishment of the "bucket brigade" convoy system. On 18 April, Dione was observed dropping depth charges on a U-boat, with no visible results.

On 19 April, Dione led a convoy of nine civilian vessels alongside another 88-foot cutter. The convoy passed Cape Hatteras without incident. A Navy aircraft then spotted an incoming torpedo and Alger ordered evasive maneuvers. The torpedo missed Dione by about 20 yards (18 m) but struck the oil tanker Axtell J. Byles. The tanker was only damaged and was still maneuverable. Dione dropped eight depth charges over the course of two runs in response to the attack. The tanker, moving under her own power, arrived in Hampton Roads that evening for repairs. The convoys began to run at night following the attack on Axtell J. Byles. Dione began patrolling around the Wimble Shoals Buoy after her escort missions were finished, she began searching for U-boats near the spot where Axtell J. Byles had been hit on 25 April. She would continue dropping depth charges for the next few days. According to Homer Hickam's 1989 book Torpedo Junction, Dione was ordered back to Little Creek for repairs and rearmament on 29 April.

===== May–June =====
According to Hickam, the repairs to Dione were finished on 13 May. Leaving Little Creek, she was accompanied by The Saturday Evening Post's reporter Charles Rawlings and photographer Jack Manning. The cutter escorted two ships and afterwards dropped depth charges on an unknown sonar ping that the writer from The Saturday Evening Post had called "Wimble Willy." The photographs were published in a 1942 article.

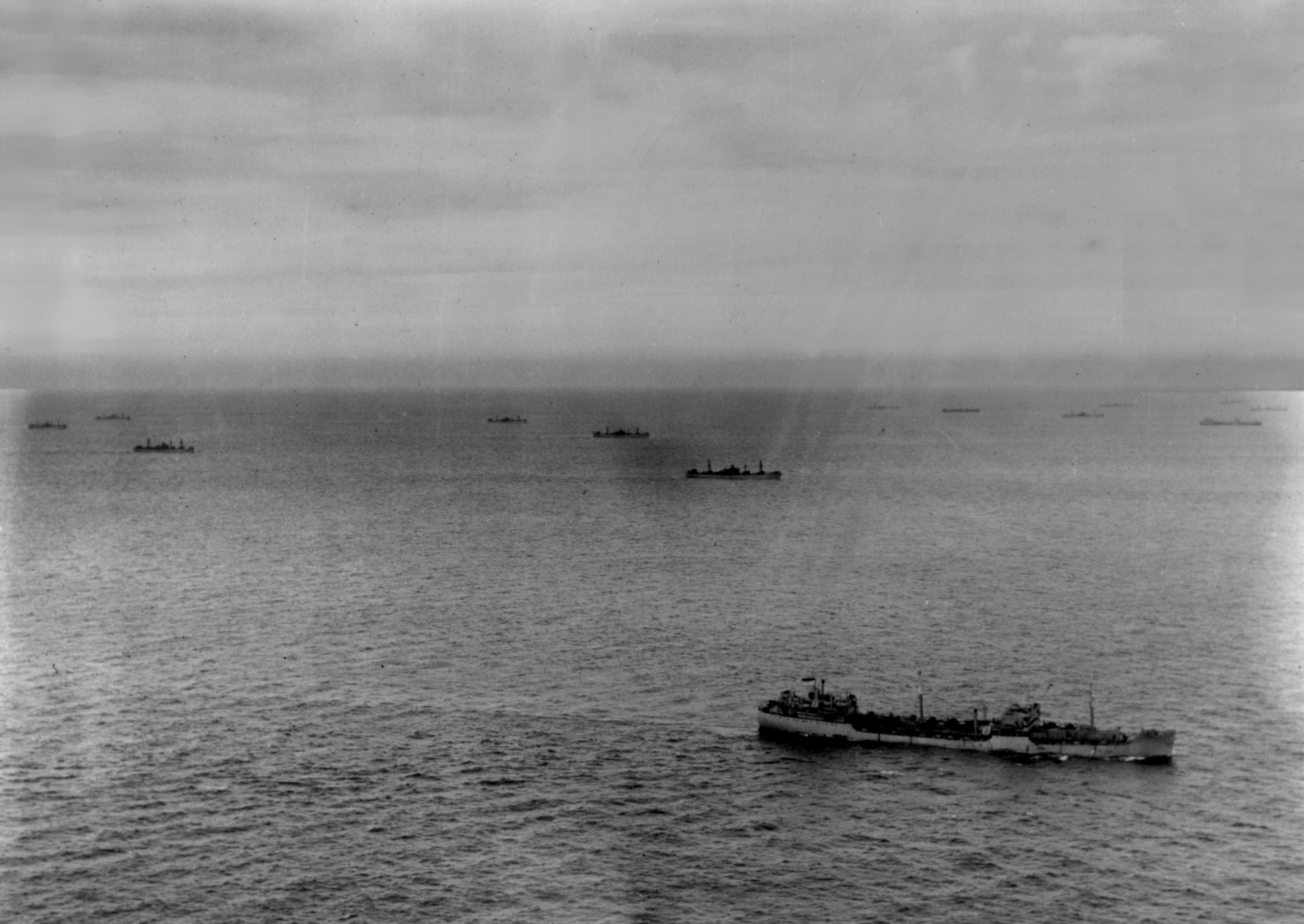
A convoy off the coast of North Carolina during World War II. Dione escorted similar convoys during the latter half of the Second Happy Time

On 18 May, Dione left Norfolk to join a convoy heading to Key West, Florida. On 20 May, crews experienced difficulty with the port engine. It was decided that she would continue on the convoy running on one engine while her other one was repaired. Dione traveled in the starboard quarter of the convoy and occasionally traveled further away from the convoy to listen for sonar pings. The cutter was eventually forced to fall to the rear position after a ship began lagging behind. The convoy reached Florida on 23 May. In May, Dione met up with the destroyer USS Ellis. The two vessels completed support missions and responded to reports from Coast Guard aircraft that alleged there were two damaged and submerged U-boats roughly 50 miles (80 km) off the coast of New Jersey; the duo then depth-charged the suspected submarines.

On 15 June, a convoy Dione was escorting formed a single-file line in preparation to enter the Chesapeake Bay. The fifth oil tanker in line, Robert C. Tuttle, struck a mine and began to sink within view of vacationers in Virginia Beach. The oil tanker Esso Augusta broke the formation as her crew believed that Robert C. Tuttle had been torpedoed by a U-boat, and Esso Augusta ended up striking a second mine as a result. Dione dropped a spread of eight depth charges, and her ninth caused another explosion. Eyewitnesses claimed to have seen a U-boat, but naval officials concluded that the incident was due to mines laid in the Thimble Shoal Channel between Virginia Beach and Virginia's eastern shore. On 24 June, at 1900 hours, the cutter made an underwater contact while escorting a northbound convoy of eleven ships. Five minutes later, Dione dropped one depth charge with no results. After sunset, at 1910 hours, two other ships in the convoy, Nordland and Manuela, were torpedoed by U-404. Dione made a sweeping search for the U-boat, which seemed to be on the starboard side of the convoy. Nordland caught fire and sank, and her survivors were rescued by Norwich City. U-404 attempted a second attack but was stopped by Dione and an aircraft.

Dione made an underwater contact the next day, 25 June, dropping five depth charges. Large amounts of oil bubbled to the surface. A doubtful contact was made just two days later, on 27 June, at 1054 hours. The cutter dropped four depth charges but yielded no results. Dione was taken to Norfolk for repairs to her starboard engine at the end of the month. They lasted a week, and the cutter was back into action at the beginning of July. She continued her convoy escort duties into July and August, though the U-boat threat off the Outer Banks had become non-existent by then. Following the end of the Second Happy Time, the crew of Dione began to refer to the period as the "Battle of Torpedo Junction."

==== September 1942–1944 ====
Dione was listed as a convoy escort unit and conducted that duty in the North Atlantic Ocean, escorting convoys that covered the New York – Key West route. She was based out of Tompkinsville, Staten Island, from December 1943 to December 1944; Thompkinsville was the site of an Eastern Sea Frontier Base.

==== 1945 ====
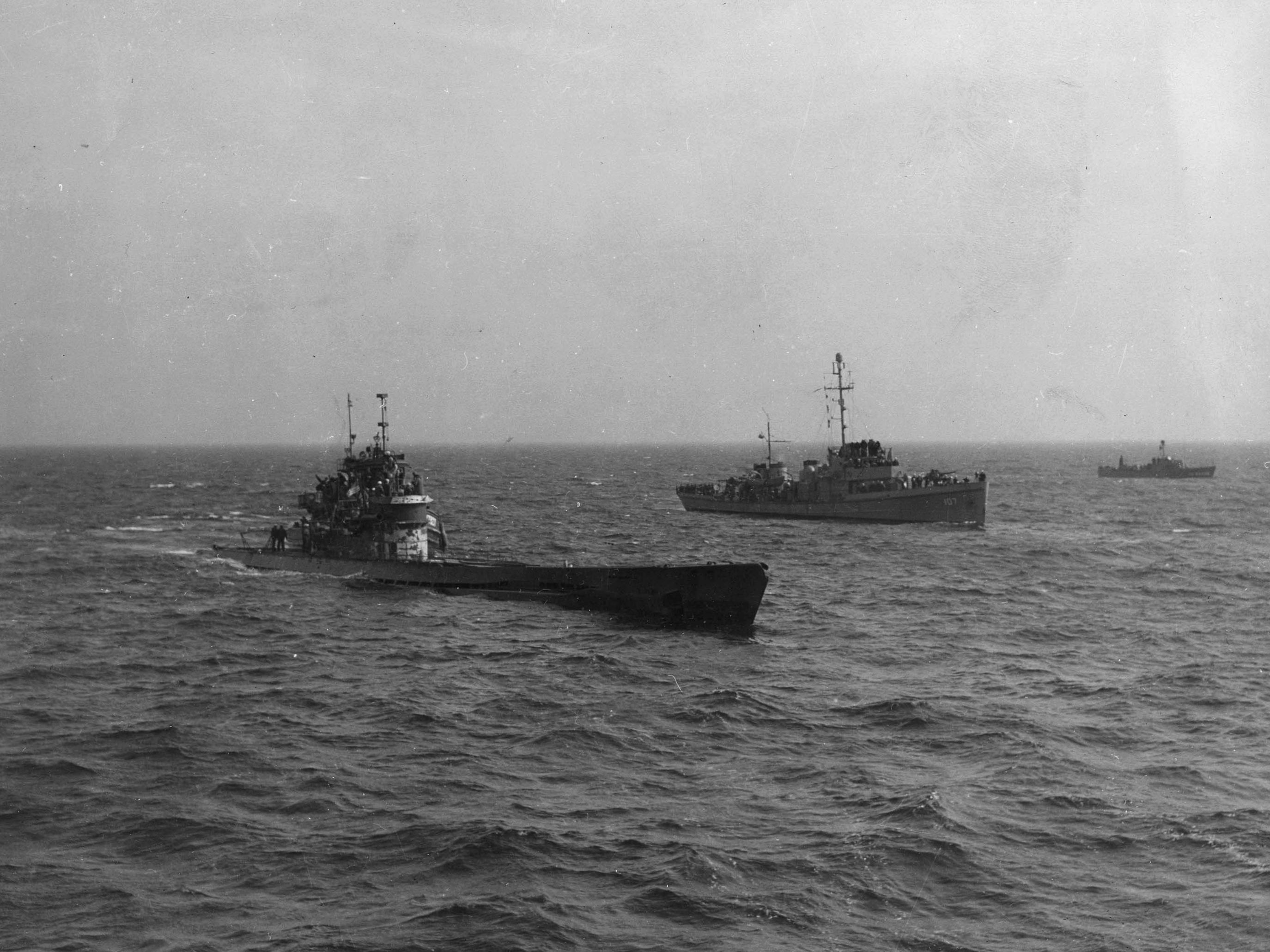
Dione (center) escorts U-1228 to Portsmouth, New Hampshire, on 17 May 1945

In 1945, Dione underwent a major refit. Her 3-inch/23-caliber gun was removed. In addition to her Y-gun and two depth charge racks, the cutter was fitted with two single-mount 3-inch/50-caliber guns, two single-mount 20 mm/80 -caliber cannons, two "Mousetrap" anti-submarine rocket launchers, and an additional Y-gun. Her wireless set and World War I-era sonar system were replaced with an SF radar system and a QCN-1 sonar system. Dione's displacement was increased to 350 long tons (360 t) and her draft was increased to 10 feet (3 m). Her complement was also increased to 7 officers and 68 enlisted personnel.

Following VE Day in May, the cutter was selected as one of six patrol vessels to serve as the Navy's "Surrender Group" for the First Naval District off New England alongside her sister ships Argo and Nemesis. The role of the Surrender Group was to help escort surrendered Axis vessels to American ports, where they would then be acquired by the United States government. Dönitz, now serving as President of Germany following the death of Adolf Hitler, had broadcast an order for all U-boats to surrender to Allied ports in early May. On 17 May, Dione rendezvoused with U-1228, a U-boat that had fled to Allied waters following the German surrender. It had received its surrender orders on 9 May and was instructed to head to St. John's, Newfoundland. The U-boat bypassed St. John's due to poor conditions and headed to a new surrender point at Casco Bay. U-1228 was escorted to Portsmouth, New Hampshire, by USS Neal A. Scott, arriving at 0600 hours on 17 May. Dione escorted the U-boat into Portsmouth later that day. Dione was sent back to the Fifth Naval District in June, where she assumed air-sea rescue duty.

=== Post-war ===
On 1 January 1946, jurisdiction over the Coast Guard was given back to the Department of the Treasury via Executive Order 9666, signed by President Harry S. Truman. From 1945 to 1947, Dione was used by the Coast Guard for law enforcement and search and rescue. She was decommissioned on 23 July 1947, in Cape May, New Jersey, where she spent several years laid up in storage due to a lack of personnel. The cutter was recommissioned on 4 February 1951, in Curtis Bay, Maryland, after a shakedown cruise in the Caribbean. Starting in 1952, Dione was assigned to the Eighth Coast Guard District and based in Freeport, Texas; she was the first cutter to be based in the city. Reportedly, Freeport competed with the city of Corpus Christi to be the location where Dione was stationed. The cutter was originally scheduled to arrive on 13 March 1952 but was delayed until 19 March due to rough weather on her shakedown cruise. She was met with a yacht escort upon her arrival in Freeport that day. Local schools were closed so students could visit Dione, and an enlisted men's dance and officer's dinner was held. The day was officially proclaimed "Coast Guard Day" by the cities of Freeport, Velasco, Clute, and Lake Jackson. Dione was based in the Freeport Lifeboat Station.

Dione operated in a similar capacity as she had in postwar Norfolk, that being a combination search and rescue and law enforcement. Among many other incidents, the cutter responded to the distress signal of a Mexican motor vessel in 1956, towed the disabled USCGC Iris in 1957, and helped put out a fire that had started aboard the Freeport sulfur barge FS-20 in 1959. In 1953, per international rules, the cutter was required to install a forward masthead light 16 feet (4.9 m) above the hull, and install an after range light—the horizontal distance had to be 18 feet (5.5 m). She was also the first of five 165 feet (50 m)-long cutters to undergo repairs to her hull in 1960. It was discovered that there was internal hull corrosion, which had been concealed by insulation, furnishings, and her C strake (Note: A ship's strake is a longitudinal course of plating that stretches from her bow to her stern.) had several leaks; attempts to use welding arcs to fix the latter ended up "burning through the basic plate" and resulted in Dione's entire strake needing to be replaced. As a result of the experience with Dione, a routine was established to inspect the hulls of the remainder of the cutters.

Dione remained in Freeport until 1963, when she was set to be decommissioned. A farewell party was held for the crew on 31 January. Dione left Freeport on 2 February. She arrived in Levingston Shipyard in Orange, Texas, on 4 February. The cutter was decommissioned on 8 February, and her custody was transferred to the Texas Group of the Atlantic Reserve Fleet—the Atlantic Reserve Fleet, Orange—that same day. Dione was sold as a supply ship on 24 February 1964.

== Commercial service ==
- Delta I (Note: The name change from Delta I to Al Rashid, which took place in late 1969, was not reflected in the March 1970 article in the Tampa Times that covered the completion of the ship's rebuild.) underway on 27 March 1970, following the completion of her rebuild in Tampa, Florida

History

United States
- Name: Dione (1964–December 1967); Big Trouble (December 1967–February 1969); Delta I(February–Late 1969); Al Rashid (Late 1969–1992)
- Owner: Palmer Decker Boat Company (1964–September 1967); Big Trouble Inc. (December 1967–February 1969); Delta Boats Inc. (February–March 1969); Sabik Inc. (March 1969–1992)
- Operator: Mideast Trading Company (c. March 1970)
- Port of registry: Port Arthur, Texas (1964–1967); New Orleans, Louisiana (1967–1992)
- In service: 1964–1992
- Refit: 1969–1970
- Identification: Official number: 297193; Call sign: WD4627; IMO number: 7515080 (as Al Rashid)
- Fate: Last seen in 1992

General characteristics
- Type: Supply ship (as sold in 1964); Geophysical exploration ship (as Delta I, pre-1970); Jack-of-all-trades ship (Post-1970); Supply ship (as Al Rashid)
- Tonnage: 256 GRT; 174 NRT
- Length: 154.3 ft (47 m)
- Beam: 25.3 ft (7.7 m)
- Draft: 11.3 ft (3.4 m)

After being sold, Dione became a merchant ship, carrying the official number 297193 and the call sign WD4627. She was first owned by the Palmer Decker Boat Company and registered in Port Arthur, Texas, according to the 1965 edition of Merchant Vessels of the United States which had been created during 1964. In March 1967, the Palmer Decker Boat Company was dissolved following a liquidation agreement unanimously executed by the company's shareholders. The ship was seized by a United States Marshal in September 1967 after foreclosure proceedings were filed against the Palmer Decker Boat Company by the Associates Discount Corporation in case 67–1335. The United States District Court for the Eastern District of Louisiana ruled in November that "Dione, her engines, tackle, apparel, etc." should be sold at a court auction to the highest bidder on 7 December.

In the 1969 edition of Merchant Vessels of the United States, created during 1968, the ship is listed under the name Big Trouble, the ownership of Big Trouble Inc., and is registered in New Orleans. Big Trouble was renamed to Delta Boats Inc. in February 1969, and Big Trouble was conveyed to Delta Boats. In March 1969, under the name Delta I, she was sold from Delta Boats to Sabik Inc., still registered in New Orleans.

On 5 April 1969, listed as a geophysical exploration ship, Delta I caught fire while going from Kingston, Jamaica, to Port of Spain, the capital city of Trinidad and Tobago; she was bound for the Persian Gulf. She had left the United States on 25 March. The crew of Delta I failed to extinguish an engine fire and abandoned the ship in her lifeboats. An SOS was received by the American Guantanamo Bay Naval Base in Cuba, which subsequently dispatched search planes. After locating the ship, the planes messaged Kingston for a Jamaican Defense Force Coast Guard patrol boat. The crew were rescued by the Jamaican Defense Force Coast Guard and a salvage vessel was sent to put out the blaze and recover the ship. Delta I was almost completely gutted by the time the fire was extinguished, with only her hull salvageable when she was towed to Tampa, Florida.

The ship was overhauled for almost a year, briefly seized by a United States Marshal in February 1970 pursuant of a ship arrest warrant filed by the Crownwell Corporation—an oil well servicing company whose majority interest had been acquired by private investors in Dubai in January—and Delta I was refitted by March that year as a "jack-of-all trades" ship. She was capable of serving as "an oil rig tender, a crew boat, buoy tender, repair ship with sand blast capacity, and a line-handling vessel for super tankers." The ship was still owned by Sabik despite the seizure, and she was chartered to the Mideast Trading Company.

Al Rashid carried the IMO number 7515080 and was listed as a supply ship in the 1978–1979 edition of Lloyd's Register of Shipping. She had a length of 154.3 feet (47 m), a beam of 25.3 feet (7.7 m), and a draft of 11.3 feet (3.4 m). She had a gross register tonnage of 256 and a net register tonnage of 174.

The fate of the former Dione is unknown, though she was last seen in service in 1992 as Al Rashid.
