= SS Kassandra Louloudis =

British, Dutch, and Greek freighter (1919–1942)

- Kassandra Louloudis in 1919 as Bondwoso

History

Netherlands
- Name: War Lurcher (1919); Bondowoso (1919–1936)
- Owner: Wm. Ruys & Sons Company
- Operator: NV Rotterdamsche Lloyd
- Ordered: 1 April 1918
- Builder: William Gray & Company
- Yard number: 914
- Launched: 26 August 1919
- Completed: 25 October 1919
- Home port: Rotterdam
- Identification: Call sign: HNCK (1919–1934); Call sign: PEDO
- Fate: Sold to the Goulandris Brothers of Greece

Greece
- Name: Kassandra Louloudis
- Owner: Goulandris Brothers of Greece
- Port of registry: Andros
- Acquired: 6 June 1936
- Identification: Call sign: SVUC
- Fate: Sunk on 18 March 1942

General characteristics
- Class & type: War-class oil freighter
- Tonnage: 5,106 GRT
- Length: 400 ft (120 m)
- Beam: 52 ft (16 m)
- Depth: 28 ft (8.5 m)
- Installed power: 3 cyl engine, 517 nominal horsepower
- Propulsion: 1 × propeller
- Speed: 10.5 kn (19.4 km/h; 12.1 mph)

SS Kassandra Louloudis was a freighter. She was originally built for the British but was completed for the Dutch in 1919 and sold to the Greeks in 1936. The freighter was sunk on 18 March 1942 by the German submarine U-124 off southern of Cape Hatteras, North Carolina.

== Construction ==
Kassandra Louloudis, was originally ordered on 1 April 1918 as yard number 914 and launched on 26 August 1919 as War Lurcher, was built by William Gray & Company in West Hartlepool, United Kingdom. She was completed on 25 October 1919 as Bondowoso for the Dutch company NV Rotterdamsche Lloyd and registered in Rotterdam. She was given the call sign HNCK.

=== Specifications ===
The freighter had a length of 400 feet (120 m), a beam of 52 feet (16 m), and a depth of 28 feet (8.5 m). She was 5,106 gross register tons. Bondowoso could travel a maximum speed of 10.5 knots (19.4 km/h; 12.1 mph). She had a three-cylinder engine with one propeller, capable of 517 nominal horsepower. The ship was built by Central Marine Engineering Works, a subsidiary of William Gray & Company.

== Service history ==
Bondowoso was originally owned by the Dutch company Wm. Ruys & Sons Company, operated by NV Rotterdamsche Lloyd, and registered in Rotterdam. In 1934, her call sign was changed to PDEO.

On 6 June 1936, the freighter was sold to the Goulandris Brothers of Greece, renamed to Kassandra Louloudis, and registered in Andros. She was given the call sign SVUC.

On 15 January 1941, the freighter departed Hoboken, New Jersey, bound for Athens. She carried 12,000,000 pounds (5,400,000 kg) of foodstuffs, medical supplies, clothing, twenty-five ambulances, and hospital trucks. The cargo cost US$1,176,000.

== Sinking ==
Kassandra Louloudis left New York City on 15 March 1942, bound for Cristóbal, Colón. She carried a cargo of "chain and hoist parts, monkey wrenches, pipe fittings, assorted hardware, conduit, turnbuckles, tires, cash registers, pneumatic tools and parts, brass rods, soap, a steel safe, and nine hundred rolls of roofing mat."

As she approached Diamond Shoals in thick fog on 17 March, she found herself traveling in a group of ships. The ship ahead of the freighter, an American oil tanker named Acme, was struck by a torpedo from U-124 at 23:52 hours (11:52 PM) on 17 March. Kassandra Louloudis' captain ordered his freighter to zig-zag, come to full speed, and head west.

U-124 fired two torpedoes at the freighter. One of them missed, but the other struck the port side of Kassandra Louloudis at 01:14 hours (1:14 AM) on 18 March. The engines were operational, but the freighter's steering gear had been knocked out. An SOS was sent out via an emergency antenna after manually cranking a backup generator. The engines were shut down and the lifeboats were launched, and all 35 men escaped the ship uninjured. They were rescued by USCGC Dione, the cutter that had previously rescued the survivors of Acme. Dione took the survivors of both ships to Norfolk, Virginia.

== Wreck ==
The wreck of Kassandra Louloudis is in 70 feet (21 m) beneath the water. The wreck is fairly intact, though the bow seems to be missing save for some anchor chains. The highest point of the wrecksite are three boilers amidships.
