= USS Calypso (AG-35) =

Ferryboat, former patrol boat

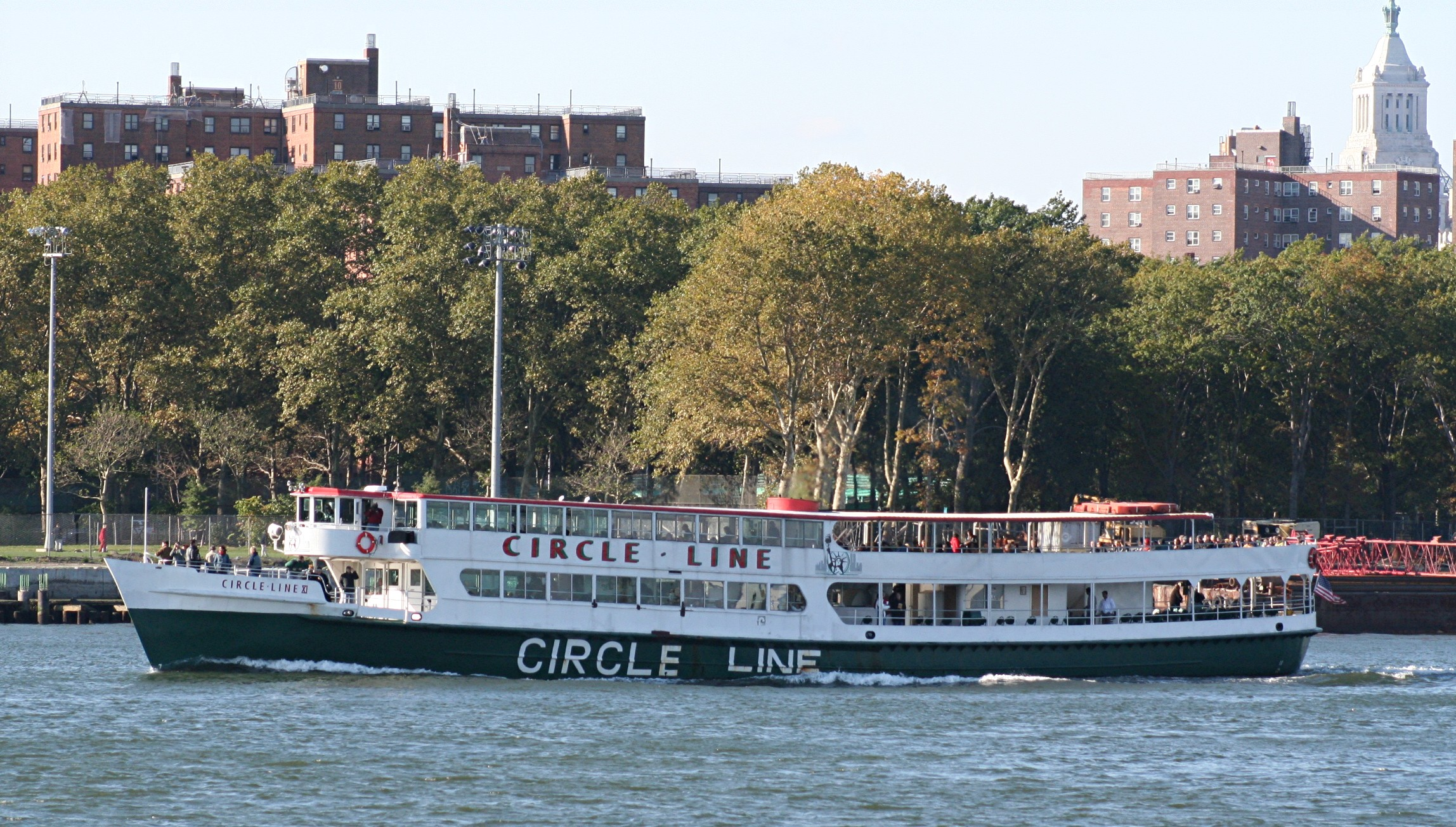
- Calypso as Circle Line XI in 2008.

History

United States
- Name: USS Calypso
- Namesake: Calypso
- Builder: Bath Iron Works
- Launched: 6 January 1932
- Acquired: 17 May 1941
- Commissioned: 17 May 1941
- Decommissioned: 20 January 1942
- Identification: AG-35

United States
- Name: Circle Line XI
- Owner: Circle Line Sightseeing Cruises
- Acquired: 1955
- In service: 1958
- Out of service: 2008
- Fate: Retired 2008

General characteristics
- Class & type: Thetis-class patrol boat
- Displacement: 357 tons
- Length: 165 ft (50 m)
- Beam: 25 ft 3 in (7.70 m)
- Draft: 13 ft 2 in (4.01 m)
- Speed: 16 knots

The third USS Calypso (AG-35) was launched 6 January 1932 for the United States Coast Guard as USCGC Calypso (WPC-104) by the Bath Iron Works in Bath, Maine. She was initially stationed at San Diego, California, and transferred to Baltimore, Maryland in 1938. She was transferred from the Coast Guard to the U.S. Navy on 17 May 1941 and commissioned the same day.

Calypso was based at the Washington Navy Yard as a tender to her sister ship, the presidential yacht Potomac. In this capacity, her operations were confined largely to the Potomac River and Chesapeake Bay until 22 July 1941, when she put out for a cruise to Nova Scotia. During a portion of this cruise she had on board President Franklin D. Roosevelt, bound for the Atlantic Charter Conference in Argentia Bay, Newfoundland, with Prime Minister Winston Churchill of the United Kingdom. Her other movements were to provide cover for the president's travels. Returning to Washington, D.C., on 23 August, Calypso was decommissioned 20 January 1942 and returned to the Coast Guard.

Calypso served as a Coast Guard-crewed cutter on the Eastern Sea Frontier defending the East Coast from German submarine attacks on merchant shipping and stationed at Norfolk, Virginia. She rescued 42 people from SS Buarque and 54 people from Arbutan in February and March 1942. On 15 September 1943 she rescued 60 sailors from the torpedoed patrol vessel USS Plymouth despite heavy seas and sharks. The Coast Guard subsequently decommissioned her on 18 July 1947.

In 1955, Calypso was acquired by Circle Line Sightseeing Cruises of Manhattan, New York and converted into a tour boat. She was renamed Circle Line XI and provided river-based tours of New York City for over 50 years before being retired in 2008. She was replaced by a new vessel named Circle Line Manhattan.

== References used ==
- "Circle Line's WWII Cutter May Take Its Final Manhattan Cruise". Going Coastal Magazine. 15 September 2008.
- Canney, Donald L. (1995). U.S. Coast Guard and Revenue Cutters, 1790–1935. Naval Institute Press, Annapolis, Maryland. ISBN 978-1-55750-101-1.
- Dropkin, Les (January 2002). "The Thetis Class Coast Guard Patrol Boats" (PDF). Potomac Association.
- Priolo, Gary P. "USCGC Calypso (WPC-104)". NavSource. Nav Source Naval History.
- Scheina, Robert L. (1982). U.S. Coast Guard Cutters & Craft of World War II. Naval Institute Press, Annapolis, Maryland. ISBN 978-0-87021-717-3.
- Scheina, Robert L. (1990). U.S. Coast Guard Cutters & Craft, 1946–1990. Naval Institute Press, Annapolis, Maryland. ISBN 978-0-87021-719-7.
