= Thetis-class patrol boat =

US Coast Guart cutter boats

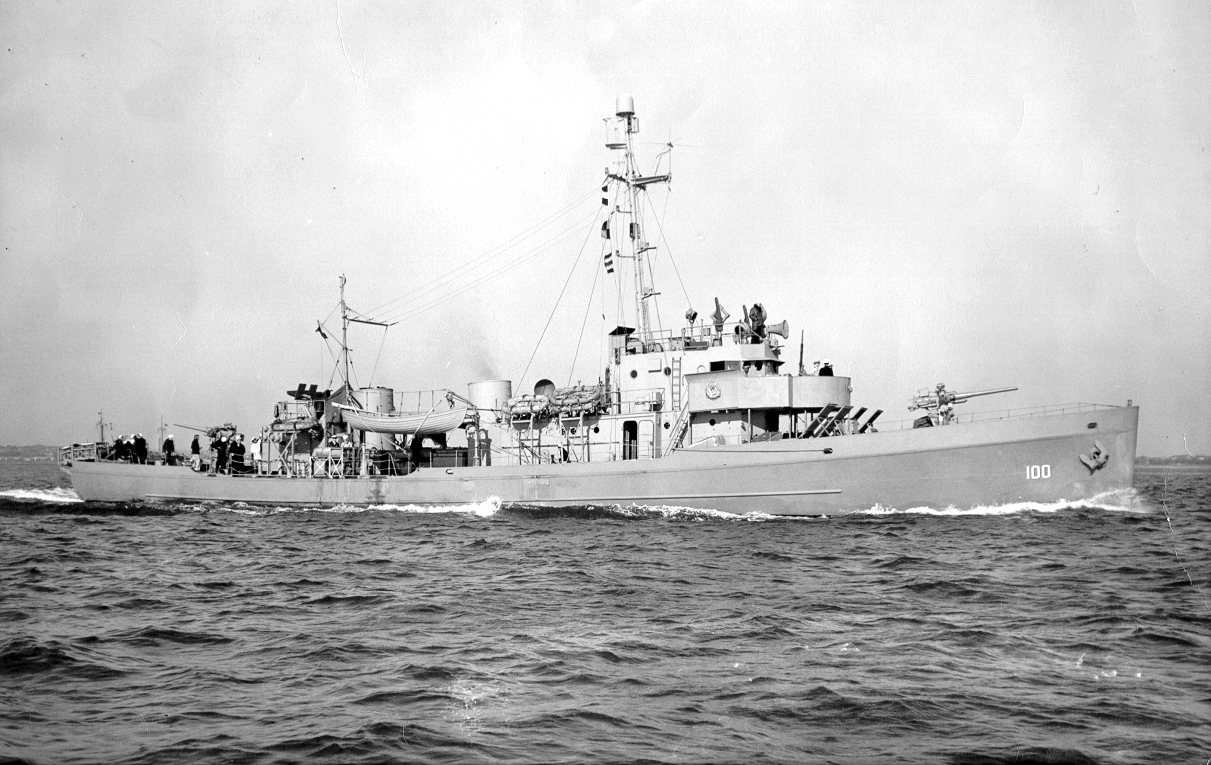
- USCGC Argo (WPC-100) underway during World War II, circa 1944

Class overview
- Name: Thetis class
- Operators: United States Coast Guard
- Built: 1931–1934
- In commission: 1931–1967
- Completed: 18
- Preserved: 1

General characteristics
- Type: Patrol boat
- Displacement: 337 long tons (342 t) (1933); 350 long tons (360 t) (1945)
- Length: 165 ft (50 m)
- Beam: 25 ft 3 in (7.70 m)
- Draft: 7 ft 8 in (2.34 m) (1933); 10 ft 0 in (3.05 m) (1945)
- Installed power: 1,340 bhp
- Propulsion: 2 × Winton Model 158 6-cylinder diesels 1,340 bhp (1,000 kW)
- Speed: 11 kn (20 km/h; 13 mph) cruising; 16 kn (30 km/h; 18 mph) maximum
- Range: 1,750 statute miles (14 knots); 3,000 statute miles (11 knots); 6,417 statute miles (6 knots)
- Complement: 44 (1933); 75 (1945)
- Sensors & processing systems: None (1933; SF radar (1945); QCO sonar (1945)
- Armament: 1933; 1 × 3-inch gun; 1 × 1-pounder gun; 1941; 1 × 3-inch gun; 1 × Y-gun; 2 x depth charge tracks; 1945; 2 x single-mount 3-inch/50-caliber gun; 2 x single mount 20 mm/80 cannon; 2 x depth charge tracks; 2 x Y-guns; 2 x Mousetraps

Thetis-class patrol boats, also called the Argo-class patrol boats, were a class of 18 steel-hulled cutters of the United States Coast Guard built from 1931 to 1934.

== Development ==
On 17 January 1920, the Volsted Act went into force in the United States. The law enforced the Eighteenth Amendment, which banned the "manufacture, sale, or transportation" of most alcohol and began the period of Prohibition. The Volsted Act, in turn, was enforced by police departments, the Bureau of Prohibition, the Customs Service, the Treasury Department, and the USCG. The USCG's role was to prevent seaborn alcohol smuggling, a role initially deemed small and manageable. By 1924, the service was overwhelmed by the volume of smugglers and struggled to intercept 5% of violators. Aside from normal duties, it shifted to impose a blockade along 5,000 miles (8,000 km) of American coastline. For the new role, new cutters, patrol boats, and ex-USN destroyers joined the fleet to patrol at sea as Prohibition enforcement became the first priority for the USCG. While the ships helped fill gaps off the coast, they were expensive to operate and performed poorly. In the 1930s, the USCG began to build purpose-build patrol boats to take over enforcement. These new ships varied in size and capability, and were used to create a continuous buffer of Prohibition enforcement that stretched from the open ocean to inner harbors.

A common tactic by smugglers was to use large, seagoing, "mother ships" that loitered off the coast and supplied alcohol to smaller boats that then brought the drinks ashore. The USCG built the 125 ft (38 m)-long Active class cutters to trail and intercept mother ships, and the experience was used to develop the next class of sea-going cutters. The resulting 165-foot "B"-class, named for the cutters' overall length and also known as the Argo and Thetis-class, resulted. The design was intended to balance and exceed in speed, seaworthiness, range, radio equipment, and armament. Eighteen cutters were built, and they were large and fast enough to intercept the mother ships.

== Ships ==
- USCGC Argo (WPC-100)
- USCGC Ariadne (WPC-101)
- USCGC Atalanta (WPC-102)
- USCGC Aurora (WPC-103)
- USCGC Calypso (WPC-104)
- USCGC Cyane (WPC-105)
- USCGC Daphne (WPC-106)
- USCGC Dione (WPC-107)
- USCGC Electra (WPC-187)
- USCGC Galatea (WPC-108)
- USCGC Hermes (WPC-109)
- USCGC Icarus (WPC-110)
- USCGC Nemesis (WPC-111)
- USCGC Nike (WPC-112)
- USCGC Pandora (WPC-113)
- USCGC Perseus (WPC-114)
- USCGC Thetis (WPC-115)
- USCGC Triton (WPC-116)
