= USCGC Pandora =

US Coast Guard patrol boat (1934–1959)

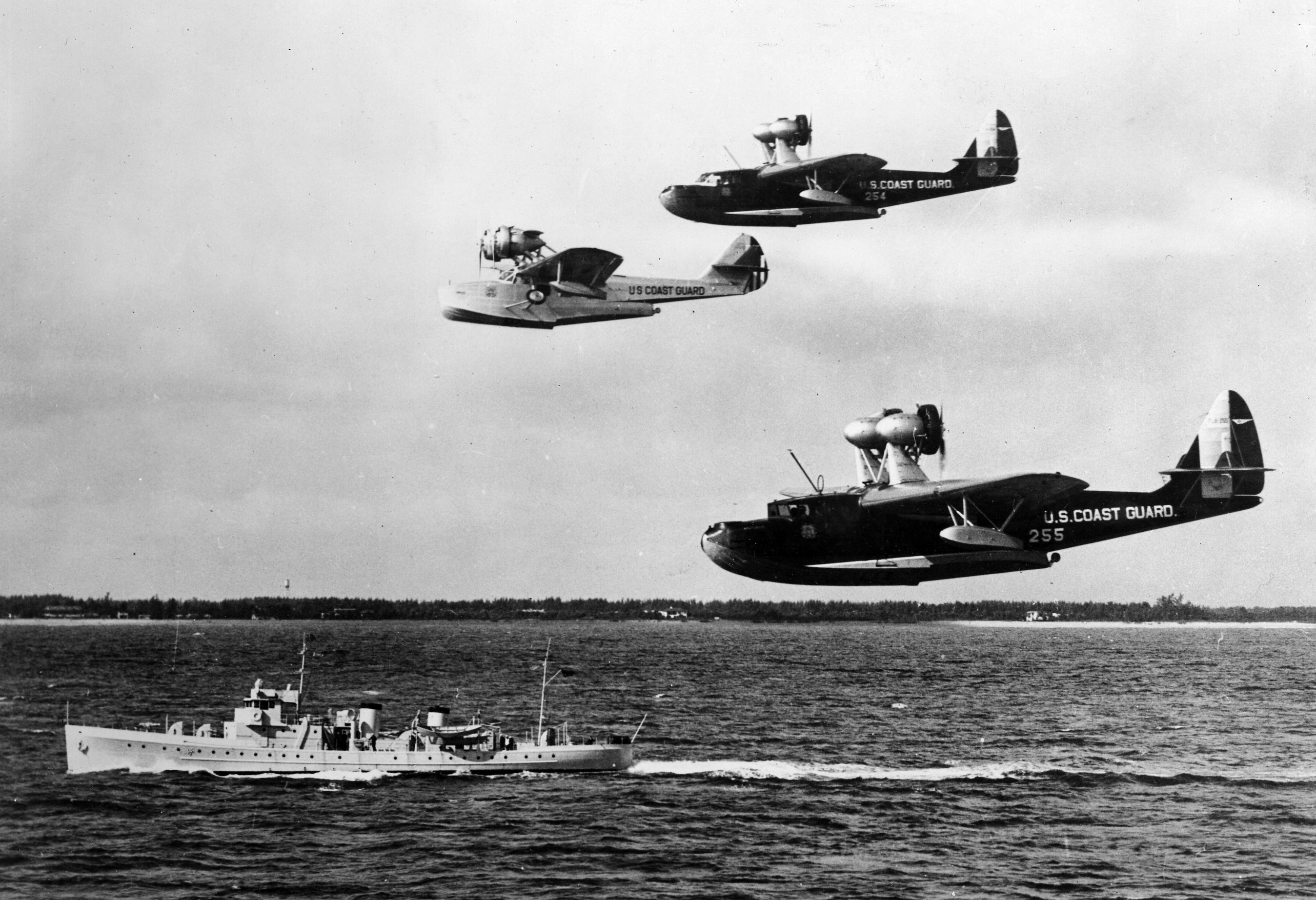
- Three Coast Guard seaplanes greet USCGC Pandora as she arrives at Miami on 6 December 1934

History

United States
- Name: Pandora
- Namesake: Pandora, a Greek mythological figure
- Builder: Manitowoc Shipbuilding Corporation
- Cost: US$258,000
- Yard number: Hull number: 273
- Launched: 30 June 1934
- Sponsored by: Margaret Hughes
- Commissioned: 1 November 1934
- Decommissioned: 1 May 1959
- In service: 1934–1959
- Refit: 1941; 1945
- Home port: Miami, Florida (1934–1939); Key West, Florida (1939–1959)
- Identification: Designation: P-13 (assigned 1934); WPC-113 (assigned 1942); Signal letters: NRGO
- Fate: Sold for scrap, 4 November 1959

General characteristics (1933 construction)
- Class & type: Thetis-class patrol boat
- Displacement: 337 long tons (342 t)
- Length: 165 ft (50 m)
- Beam: 25 ft 3 in (7.70 m)
- Draft: 7 ft 8 in (2 m)
- Installed power: 2 × Winton, 6-cyl, Model 158 diesels; 1,340 hp (1,000 kW)
- Speed: 16 kn (30 km/h; 18 mph)) (maximum); 11 kn (20 km/h; 13 mph) (cruising)
- Range: 3,000 mi (4,800 km) (cruising)
- Complement: 5 officers, 68 men
- Armament: 1 × 3-inch/23 gun; 2 × 1 lb (0.45 kg) guns

General characteristics (1941 refit)
- Armament: 1 × 3-inch/23 gun; 2 × depth charge tracks; 1 × Y-gun

General characteristics (1945 refit)
- Complement: 7 officers, 68 men
- Armament: 2 × 3-inch/50; 2 × single 20mm/80 guns; 2 × depth charge tracks; 2 × Mousetraps; 1 × Y-gun

USCGC Pandora (WPC-113) was a Thetis-class patrol boat and United States Coast Guard Cutter. She was commissioned in November 1934 and was based in Florida. She patrolled the Eastern Sea Frontier during World War II, and then the Gulf of Mexico during the postwar years. She was decommissioned in 1959 and sold for scrap.

== Design ==
Pandora had an overall length of 165 feet (50 m), a beam of 25.25 feet (7.70 m), and a draft of 7.67 feet (2.34 m). Her displacement was 337 long tons (342 tonnes). She had a complement of 5 officers and 68 men. The cutter was propelled by two Winton 6-cylinder, Model 158 diesel engines. They were capable of producing 1,340 brake horsepower (1,000 kW). She had a maximum speed of 16 knots (30 km/h; 18 mph) and a cruising speed of 11 knots (20 km/h; 13 mph); she had a radius of 3,000 miles (4,800 km) while traveling at her cruising speed. She was armed with a 3-inch/23-caliber gun and two 1 lb (0.45 kg) guns.

== Construction ==
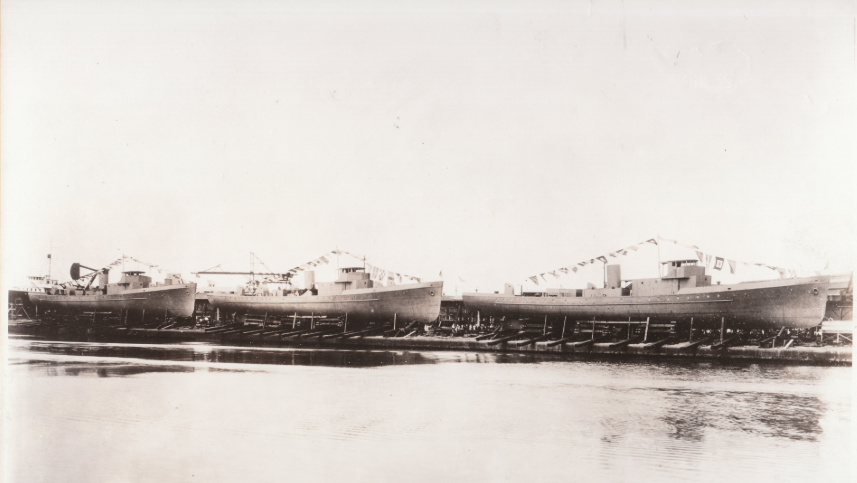
Pandora (right) alongside her sister ships Dione and Electra, 1934

Pandora was a 165-foot (B) Thetis-class patrol craft, designated hull number 273, built by the Manitowoc Shipbuilding Company in Manitowoc, Wisconsin. The launch of the cutter and her two sister ships, Dione and Electra, was originally to occur on 23 June; the launch was postponed one week per an announcement by the chief government inspector and shipyard officials. The cutter was launched alongside her sisters on 30 June 1934. Pandora was christened by Margaret Hughes, niece of Congressman James F. Hughes of De Pere. She was commissioned 1 November 1934. The cutter was named for Pandora, the woman that opened her namesake box and let human ills out into the world in Greek mythology. She was assigned the building number P-15 and the signal letters NRGO. She cost US$258,000 to construct.

== Service history ==
Pandora was stationed at Miami, arriving 6 December 1934. She was headquartered there until 1939, when she was transferred to Key West. She participated in a "Goodwill Cruise" in January 1940, visiting Mexico and Central America. The cutter was transferred to the US Navy on 1 November 1941 after the issuing of Executive Order 8929 and was assigned to the Eastern Sea Frontier. She was re-armed with two racks to hold depth charges and a Y-gun depth charge launcher, which was designed to throw depth charges over the sides of the cutter and into the water.

The cutter served as a naval coastal patrol and rescue craft out of Key West for the duration of World War II. Sometime in February 1942, the Thetis-class patrol boats were issued alpha-numeric designations, that began with WPC. Pandora was designated WPC-113.

In 1945, the cutter underwent a refit. Her complement was increased to 7 officers and 68 men. She was equipped with two mousetrap anti-submarine rocket launchers, two single 20 mm/80 guns, and two 3-inch/50-caliber naval guns. Her 3-inch/23-caliber gun was removed. Pandora was returned to the Treasury Department on 1 January 1946, patrolling the Gulf of Mexico until she was decommissioned on 1 May 1959 and sold for scrap on 4 November 1959.
