= USCGC Atalanta =

United States Coast Guard patrol boat

History

United States
- Name: USCGC Atalanta
- Namesake: Atalanta
- Builder: Lake Union Dry Dock Company, Seattle
- Launched: 16 June 1934
- Commissioned: 20 Sep 1934
- Decommissioned: 1 August 1950
- Identification: WPC-102
- Fate: Sold, 7 December 1954

General characteristics
- Class & type: Thetis-class patrol boat
- Displacement: 337 long tons (342 t) (1933); 350 long tons (360 t) (1945)
- Length: 165 ft (50 m)
- Beam: 25 ft 3 in (7.70 m)
- Draft: 7 ft 8 in (2.34 m) (1933); 10 ft 0 in (3.05 m) (1945)
- Installed power: 1,340 bhp
- Propulsion: 2 × Winton Model 158 6-cylinder diesels 1,340 brake horsepower (1,000 kW)
- Speed: 11 kn (20 km/h; 13 mph) cruising; 16 kn (30 km/h; 18 mph) maximum
- Range: 1,750 statute miles (14 knots); 3,000 statute miles (11 knots); 6,417 statute miles (6 knots)
- Complement: 44 (1933); 75 (1945)
- Sensors & processing systems: None (1933; SF Radar (1945); QCO Sonar (1945)
- Armament: 1933; 1 × 3 inch gun; 1 × 1-pounder; 1941; 1 × 3 inch gun; 1 × Y-gun; 2 x depth charge tracks; 1945; 2 x single-mount 3"/50 caliber gun; 2 x single mount 20mm/80 cannon; 2 x depth charge tracks; 2 x Y-guns; 2 x Mousetraps

USCGC Atalanta (WPC-102) was a 165-foot (50 m), steel-hulled, diesel-powered Thetis-class patrol boat of the United States Coast Guard.

== History ==
She was launched on 16 June 1934 at the Seattle shipyard of Lake Union Dry Dock & Machine Works, one of 18 Thetis-class patrol boats. She was commissioned on 20 September 1934 and assigned to Seattle, Washington where she conducted rescue and law enforcement operations as well as annual Bering Sea patrols. In September 1942, Atalanta was assigned to the United States Navy Western Sea Frontier where she conducted convoy escort and patrol duty. She was one of the early ships in the "Alaskan Navy".

Atalanta was decommissioned on 1 August 1950 and was placed in mothball at the Coast Guard mooring in Kennydale, Renton, Washington. On 7 December 1954, she was sold to Birchfield Boiler, Inc., of Tacoma, Washington, for $7,156.
