= USCGC Thetis (WPC-115) =

United States Coast Guard patrol boat

History

United States
- Name: Thetis
- Builder: Bath Iron Works, Bath, Maine
- Completed: 9 November 1931
- Commissioned: 1 December 1931
- Decommissioned: 1 July 1947
- Fate: Sold 1 July 1948

General characteristics
- Class & type: Thetis-class patrol boat
- Displacement: 337 long tons (342 t)
- Length: 165 ft (50 m)
- Beam: 25 ft 3 in (7.70 m)
- Draft: 8 ft 6 in (2.59 m)
- Speed: 16 kn (30 km/h; 18 mph)
- Complement: 50
- Armament: 1 × 3"/23 gun; 2 × 1-pounder guns (1932)

USCGC Thetis (WPC-115), a steel-hulled, diesel-powered Thetis-class patrol boat of the United States Coast Guard.

== History ==
=== Coast Guard service ===
The contract for her construction was awarded to the Bath Iron Works, Bath, Maine on 21 January 1931. She was commissioned as Coast Guard Patrol Boat No. 1 on 1 December 1931.

Assigned to the homeport of Stapleton, New York in 1931 she was transferred to Boston, Massachusetts in 1935. On 1 July 1941, four months in advance of the directive whereby the United States Coast Guard was transferred from the United States Department of the Treasury to the United States Navy, Thetis and five of her sister ships were turned over to the Navy. This action occurred simultaneously with the establishment of the four Sea Frontiers.

Four Thetis-class patrol boats, including Thetis, were assigned to the East Coast Sound School, Key West, Florida, for duty as patrol and training vessels. Their collateral duties included operating under the aegis of Commander, Task Force 6, on Gulf patrol duties.

=== World War II ===
At the time of the Japanese Attack on Pearl Harbor on 7 December 1941, Thetis was operating out of Key West. In or around February 1942, Thetis was classified as a patrol craft and given the hull classification symbol WPC-115.

Thetis's antisubmarine warfare (ASW) training missions were conducted along with local patrol and escort duties out of Key West from 1941 to June 1945. On 13 June 1942, Thetis located U-157 and sunk her in a single depth charge attack. On 7 January 1944 she rescued seven survivors from USS St. Augustine which had accidentally been rammed by merchant tanker Camas Meadows off the coast of Cape May, New Jersey.

=== Post war service ===
In June 1945, Thetis was assigned to air-sea rescue service with the Third Coast Guard District. She was decommissioned on 1 July 1947 and sold on 1 July 1948.

== References used ==
- "St Augustine PG-54". HistoryCentral.com. History Central.
- Canney, Donald L. (1995). U.S. Coast Guard and Revenue Cutters, 1790–1935. Naval Institute Press, Annapolis, Maryland. ISBN 978-1-55750-101-1.
- Dropkin, Les (January 2002). "The Thetis Class Coast Guard Patrol Boats" (PDF). Potomac Association.
- Scheina, Robert L. (1982). U.S. Coast Guard Cutters & Craft of World War II. Naval Institute Press, Annapolis, Maryland. ISBN 978-0-87021-717-3.
