= USCGC Argo =

United States Coast Guard boat

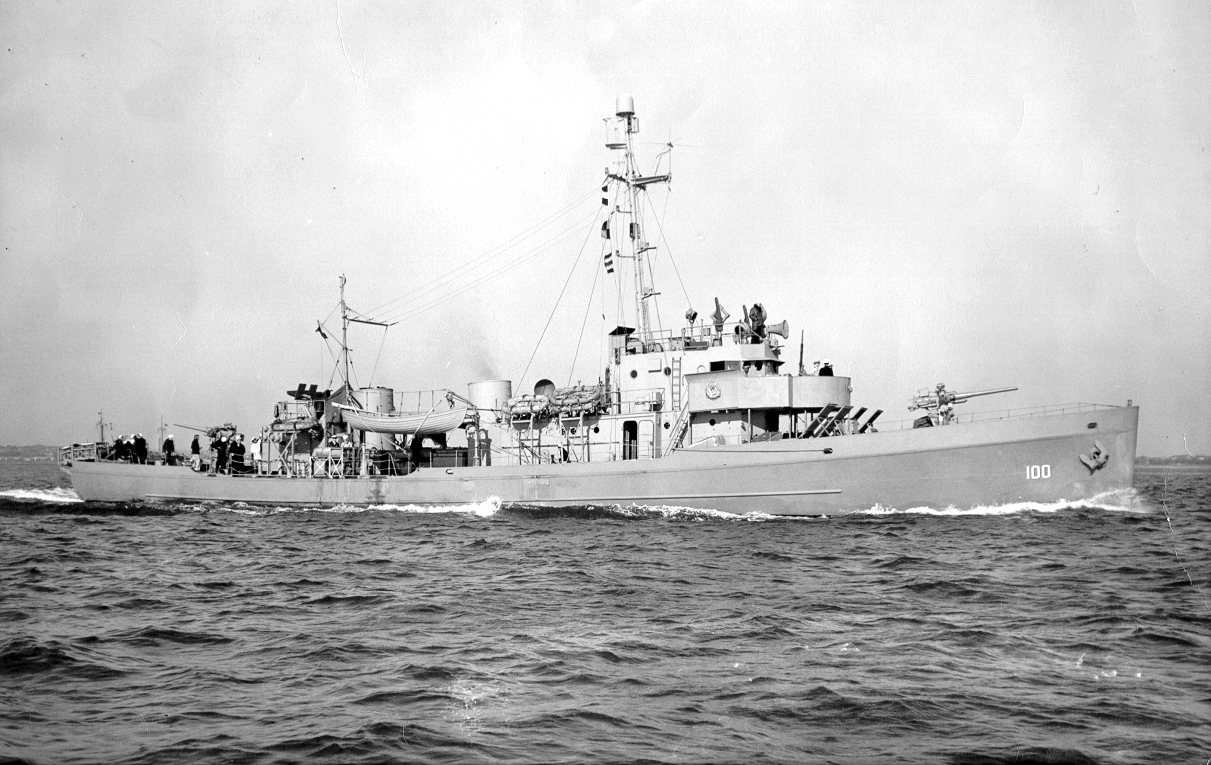
- USCGC Argo (WPC-100) underway during World War II, circa 1944.

History

United States
- Name: USCGC Argo
- Namesake: Argo
- Builder: John H. Mathis & Company
- Launched: 12 November 1932
- Commissioned: 6 January 1933
- Decommissioned: 30 October 1948
- Identification: WPC-100
- Fate: Sold, 2 November 1955

United States
- Name: Sightseer XII
- Owner: Circle Line Sightseeing Cruises
- Identification: MMSI number: 367032250; Callsign: WM8392
- Status: In service

General characteristics
- Class & type: Thetis-class patrol boat
- Displacement: 337 long tons (342 t)
- Length: 165 ft (50 m)
- Beam: 25 ft 3 in (7.70 m)
- Draft: 7 ft 8 in (2.34 m)
- Propulsion: 2 × Winton Model 158 6-cylinder diesels 1,340 brake horsepower (1,000 kW)
- Speed: 11 kn (20 km/h; 13 mph) cruising; 16 kn (30 km/h; 18 mph) maximum
- Complement: 44
- Armament: 1 × 3 inch gun; 1 × 1-pounder

USCGC Argo (WPC-100) was a Thetis-class patrol boat belonging to the United States Coast Guard launched on 12 November 1932 and commissioned on 6 January 1933.

== Coast Guard career ==
Argo was built by John H. Mathis Company in Camden, New Jersey in 1932 and entered service on 6 January 1933. Her initial homeport was Stapleton, New York until 13 March 1934 when she was transferred to Newport, Rhode Island. She remained in Newport until early 1942. During this time she served on United States Coast Guard Academy cadet training cruises in the Atlantic.

Early in 1942 Argo was attached to the Atlantic Fleet as a convoy escort. While on escort duty on 22 June 1942, Argo made a depth charge attack in which the charges failed to explode. On the 27th of the same month, she made another contact at 10:45 but ended the search fifteen minutes later. Two minutes later a ship in the convoy was torpedoed and at 01:49 Argo found a contact at 1,500 yards (1,400 m) with the target moving slowly to the right. The cutter closed to 650 yards (590 m) but lost contact at 150 yards (140 m) and released a five-charge pattern and sighted a large oil bubble upon completion of the attack. Investigating the location where the charges were released, her crew observed a large area of bubbles and an oil slick leading to the horizon, presumably in the vicinity but beyond where the attack was made. At 02:10 she released a pattern of three charges and oil was still coming to the surface. She then released one charge at a depth of over 300 feet (91 m) (rather than the other set for 200 ft, 61 m). Presuming the submarine was destroyed, she changed course to rejoin the convoy.

While Argo was in convoy on 6 January 1944, the merchant tanker Camas Meadows and the Navy gunboat USS St. Augustine collided. St. Augustine sank quickly and Argo rescued 23 survivors and picked up six bodies. Crewmembers from Argo and her sister ship Thetis were recognized for their actions following the collision.

Sometime after 24 March 1944 Argo was placed in reduced commission at the Chelsea Navy Base near Boston, Massachusetts.

On 11 May 1945, three days after the surrender of Germany, while patrolling off the east coast, Argo participated in the surrender of three German submarines: U-805, U-234 and U-873. The cutter took aboard a number of prisoners and escorted the German submarines to Portsmouth Navy Yard in Portsmouth, New Hampshire without incident.

=== Post war service ===
Later in 1945, Argo was assigned to the First Coast Guard District and was assigned to rescue duty. Her new homeport was Rockland, Maine. In 1947 the commander of First Coast Guard District requested to place Argo in "out of commission, in reserve" status due to manpower shortages. The request was not initially approved. The establishment of the Weather Patrol Program strained Coast Guard manpower and the Argo was placed in reserve status. The buoy tender USCGC Spar towed the vessel to Cape May, New Jersey where she was laid up.

== Later career ==
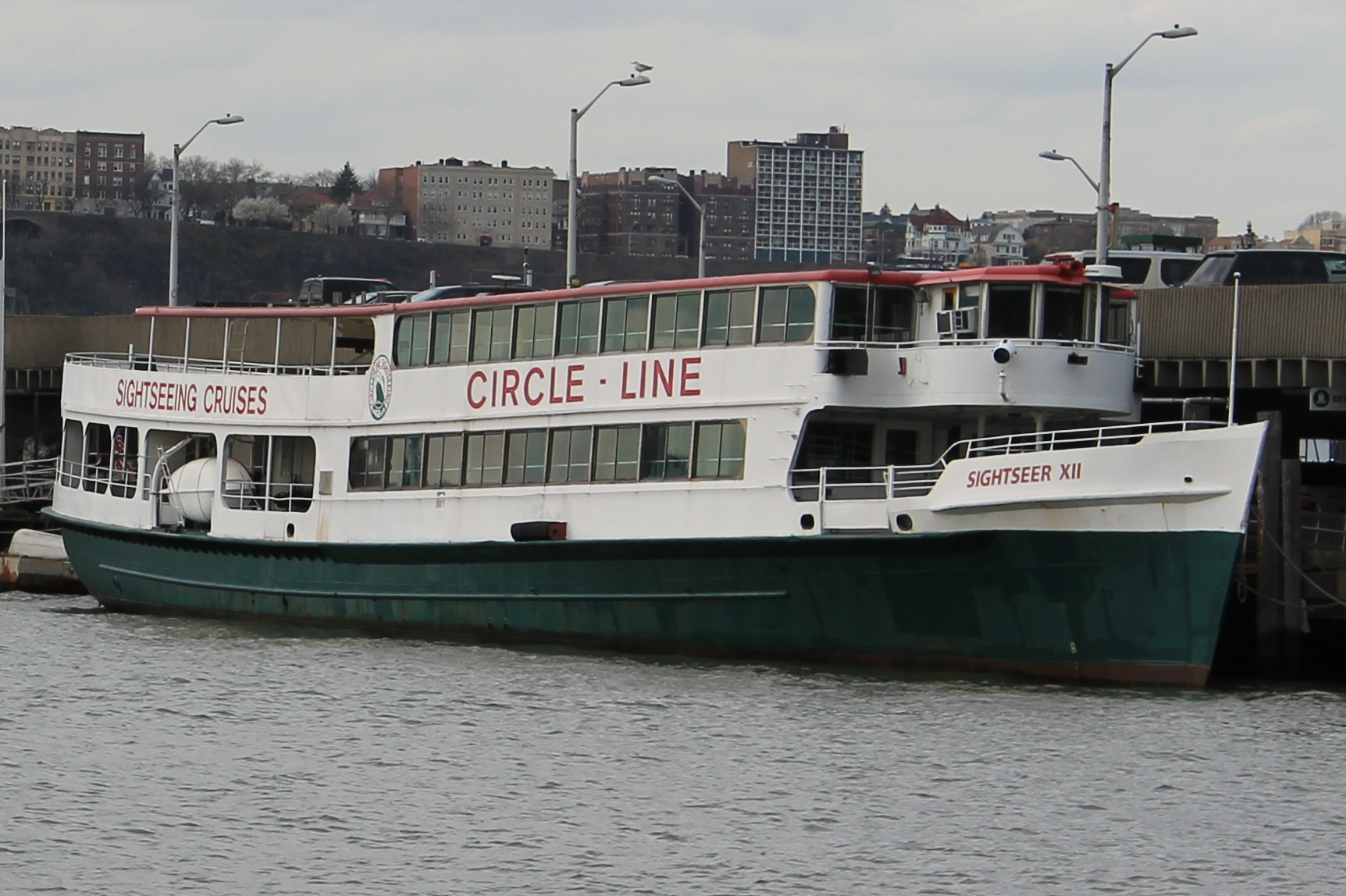
Argo as Sightseer XII in 2016.

Argo was decommissioned on October 30, 1948 and sold on 2 November 1955 to A.T. Davies, Birchfield Boiler, Inc. of Tacoma, Washington for $15,564. She was eventually acquired by Circle Line Sightseeing Cruises of New York City and greatly modified for passenger service. She was re-engined with eight General Motors 6-71 Quad diesel engines (four per shaft) and Falk reverse/reduction gears with individual hydraulically operated clutches for each engine. As of early 2017, she was serving in New York Harbor as Sightseer XII.

== Awards ==
- American Defense Service Medal
- American Campaign Medal
- European-African-Middle Eastern Campaign Medal
- World War II Victory Medal

== See also ==
- List of United States Coast Guard cutters
