= USS Potomac (AG-25) =

Yacht of US President Franklin D. Roosevelt

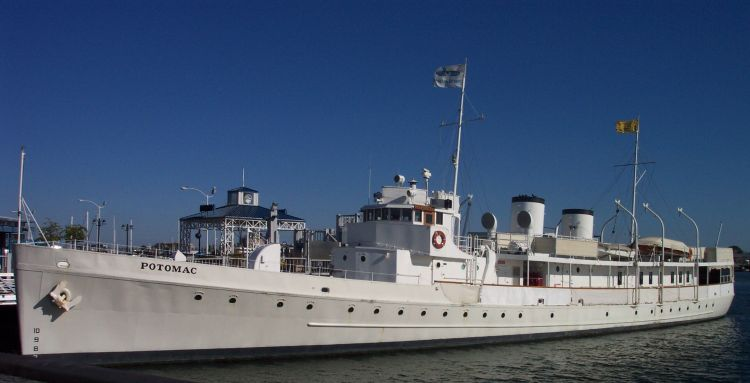
- USS Potomac at Oakland, California

History

United States
- Name: USCGC Electra
- Builder: Manitowoc Shipbuilding Company, Manitowoc, Wisconsin
- Laid down: 5 March 1934
- Launched: 30 June 1934
- Commissioned: 25 October 1934
- Identification: MMSI number: 367166810; Callsign: WBF7534
- Fate: Transferred to the Navy, 8 November 1935

United States
- Name: USS Potomac
- Namesake: Potomac River
- Acquired: 8 November 1935
- Commissioned: 1936
- Decommissioned: 15 November 1945
- Renamed: Potomac, 30 January 1936
- Reclassified: AG-25, 11 November 1935
- Stricken: 25 February 1946
- Fate: Returned to the Coast Guard, 23 November 1945
- Status: Museum ship

General characteristics
- Type: Thetis-class patrol boat
- Displacement: 370 long tons (376 t) light; 416 long tons (423 t) full
- Length: 165 ft (50 m)
- Beam: 23 ft 9 in (7.24 m)
- Draft: 8 ft 1 in (2.46 m)
- Propulsion: 2 × Winton Model 6-158 diesel engines, 1,340 shp (999 kW); 2 × three-blade propellers
- Speed: 13 knots (24 km/h; 15 mph)
- Complement: 45
- Armament: 1 × 3"/23 caliber gun
- USS Potomac
- U.S. National Register of Historic Places
- U.S. National Historic Landmark
- Oakland Designated Landmark
- Location within Oakland, California Location within California Location within the United States
- Location: Jack London Square, Oakland, California
- Coordinates: 37°47′43″N 122°16′48.4″W
- Built: 1934
- NRHP reference No.: 87000068
- ODL No.: 95

Significant dates
- Added to NRHP: 20 February 1987
- Designated NHL: 14 December 1990
- Designated ODL: 1985

USS Potomac (AG-25), formerly USCGC Electra, was Franklin D. Roosevelt's presidential yacht from 1936 until his death in 1945. On 3 August 1941, she played a decoy role while Roosevelt held a secret conference to develop the Atlantic Charter.

USS Potomac and USS Sequoia are the last two existing U.S. presidential yachts, after USS Williamsburg was scrapped in January 2016. Potomac is now preserved in Oakland, California, as a National Historic Landmark and the only presidential yacht open to the public.

== Service history ==
=== 1934–1945 ===
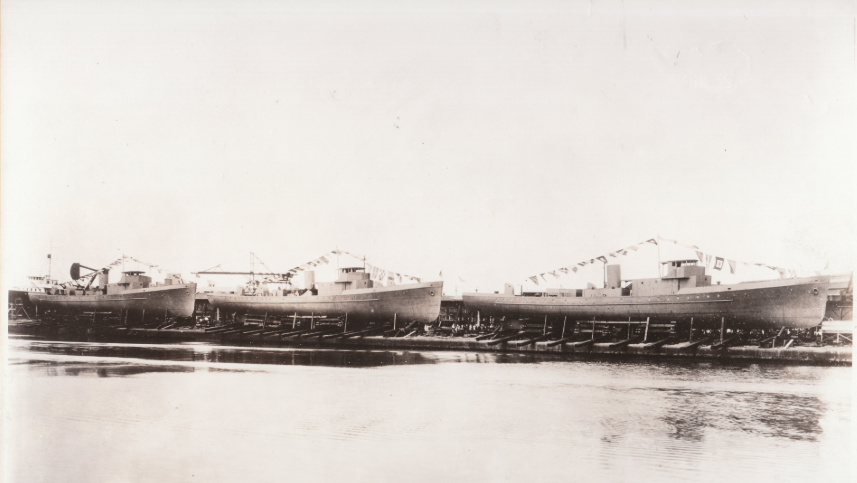
Electra (center) in 1934, before her launching, alongside her sisters Dione and Pandora

Potomac was built in 1934 by the Manitowoc Shipbuilding Company in Manitowoc, Wisconsin, as the United States Coast Guard Cutter Electra. Commissioned on 25 October 1934, Electra was a submarine chaser that served in anti-bootlegging operations. She was chosen to be the new presidential yacht after the Secret Service deemed USS Sequoia a fire hazard. The thought of having a wooden boat that could easily catch fire was not appealing to President Franklin D. Roosevelt, who as a child witnessed his aunt burn to death in an oil lamp accident. He also wanted a vessel in which he could move independently and take fishing trips. Electra was officially renamed USS Potomac on 30 January 1936, converted to serve as a presidential yacht and commissioned into the United States Navy on 2 March 1936.

There were approximately $60,000 in upgrades made while converting the ship into a presidential yacht, to make the vessel wheelchair-accessible and more accommodating. These upgrades included the conversion of the aft smokestack to a false one, a new salon, installation of brass fixtures, the presidential stateroom and bath, three guest cabins and teak decks. Additions to the fantail included a vast leather settee, patio furniture and bulletproof glass. In the false smokestack, there was an elevator with a pulley system designed so that President Roosevelt could transport himself to the boat deck. The fantail couch is designed so that each sitting party has their legs completely stretched out when sitting back and the president could sit equally as his guests with his legs supported. An antiaircraft machine gun was installed and mounted when the president was on board. Ship ballast was added to the vessel to account for these upgrades. However, the ship still rolled as far as 48 degrees in rough waters, causing many a guest to turn to the rail. The president, being the sailor he was, was affected little.

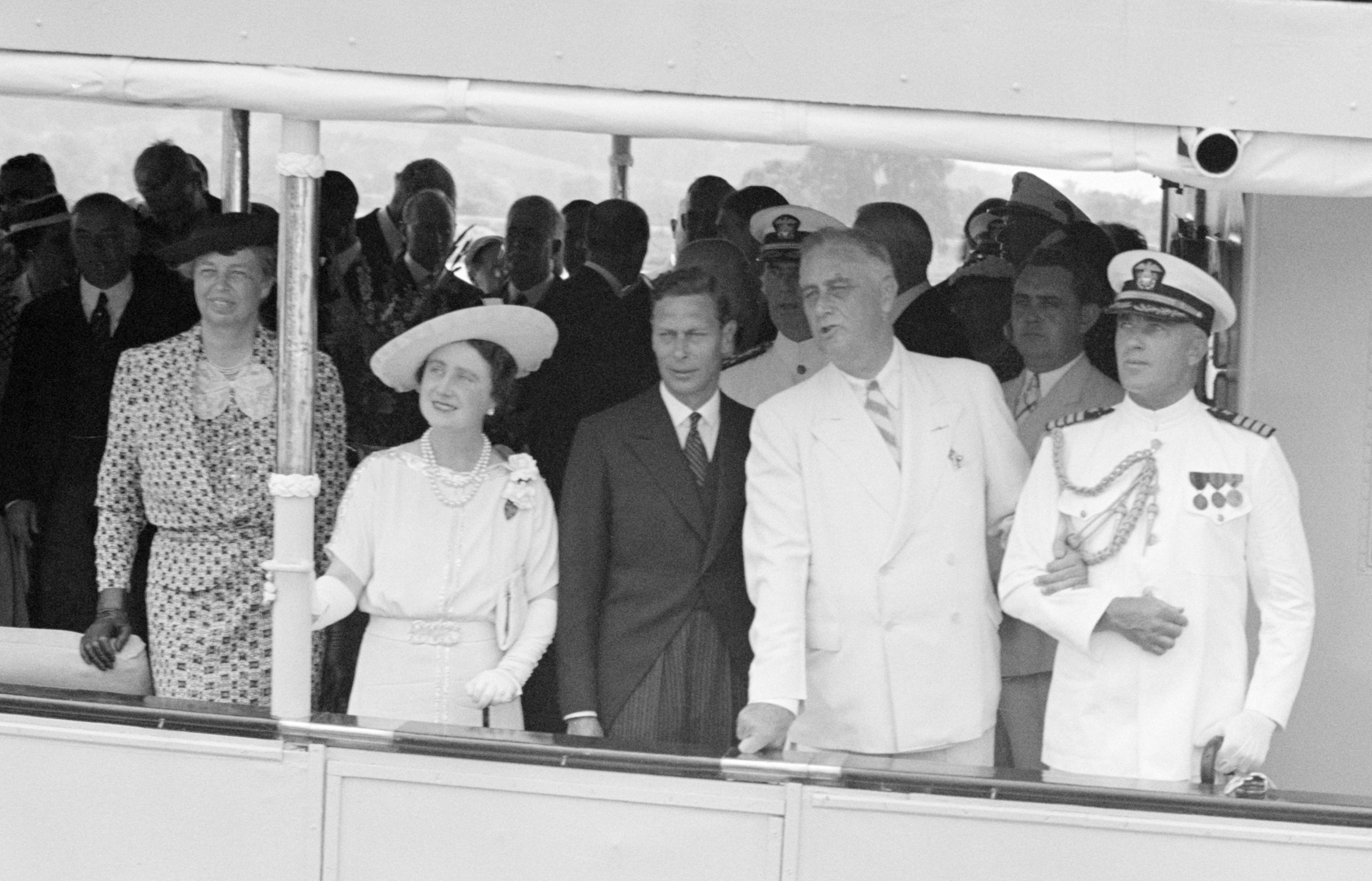
Franklin and Eleanor Roosevelt with George VI and Queen Elizabeth, sailing from Washington, D.C., to Mount Vernon on USS Potomac (9 June 1939)

In the following years, USS Potomac was heavily used by President Roosevelt for fishing trips and informal political meetings. Potomac served as a place where relationships were built and deals were made. In 1939 the United Kingdom's King George VI and Queen Elizabeth travelled with the Roosevelts aboard Potomac to George Washington's home at Mount Vernon. This was the first visit by British royalty to an American president. The ship now commissioned USS Potomac was categorized as AG-25, indicating the Navy ship designation of Auxiliary Miscellaneous and number 25th in this designation, and was known informally as the “Floating White House”.

It is rumored that the National Labor Relations Act of 1935 was signed on board the ship. Ship logs have been recovered documenting voyages to the Gulf of Mexico and Dry Tortugas, Florida. On 28 March 1941, President Roosevelt delivered a fireside chat to the nation from the radio room of USS Potomac in which he stated "the time calls for courage and more courage." After the bombing of Pearl Harbor, the yacht was considered a potential target and used more cautiously by the president.

On 3 August 1941, President Roosevelt left Washington to board Potomac at the submarine base at New London, Connecticut. Potomac then sailed for Apponagansett Bay, Massachusetts, where the president did some fishing and entertained guests including Crown Princess Märtha of Norway. Eventually Potomac anchored in Menemsha Bight in Vineyard Sound, where the heavy cruiser USS Augusta already lay at anchor. In the early hours of 5 August Potomac came alongside Augusta and the president and his party transferred to the warship. Augusta then proceeded at high speed to Newfoundland for a clandestine meeting between Roosevelt and Winston Churchill. During this meeting, Roosevelt and Churchill agreed to the Atlantic Charter, laying out the principles of the Allied partnership during World War II and setting the scene for the United Nations to plan the post-war peace.

In the meantime and for security purposes, the President's flag continued to be flown from Potomac while she transited the Cape Cod Canal in New England waters. A Secret Service man, approximating the president in size and affecting his mannerisms when visible from a distance, played a starring role in the deception. Press releases issued daily from Potomac led all who read them to believe that the president was really embarked on a pleasure cruise on his yacht. After the meetings, Augusta returned the president to Potomac on 14 August.

After President Roosevelt's death, Potomac was decommissioned by the Navy, and returned to the US Coast Guard in November 1945.

=== 1945–1980 ===
USS Potomac was decommissioned by President Harry S. Truman, who chose the larger USS Williamsburg as his presidential yacht. Unlike his predecessor, Truman was not a sailor and could not handle the extreme rolling on the Potomac. Being an accomplished classical pianist, Truman also wanted a grand piano aboard his yacht, which the Potomac could not accommodate. The Coast Guard decommissioned Potomac on 23 May 1946.

After being decommissioned, Potomac remained docked in Cambridge, Maryland and served with the Maryland Tidewater Fisheries Commission as one of forty fishery enforcement boats for the clam, crab, fish and oyster fishermen of the area until 1960. To accommodate President Roosevelt's need for wheelchair accessibility, a concealed elevator had been installed inside what had been one of Potomac's smokestacks to carry the president from the main deck to the boat deck. This smokestack-elevator shaft was removed and now sits in Cambridge at Long Wharf park as a monument to the former president and his 1935 visit to Cambridge on the previous presidential yacht, USS Sequoia.

Potomac was sold to Warren G. Toone in April 1960 and ostensibly used as a private ferry boat between Puerto Rico and the Virgin Islands. In reality she was used for offshore gambling. In 1962, there was a failed attempt to attend the World's Fair in Seattle due to engine trouble in Long Beach. She was registered in 1963 by Hydro-Capital in Newport Beach, California as a museum ship with call sign WA9710. Records show Potomac's home port was Los Angeles from 1963 to 1967. In January 1964 she was purchased by Elvis Presley for US$55,000 as a gift to the March of Dimes, so they could auction it, but they kindly declined and therefore it was then offered to St. Jude Children's Research Hospital, in Memphis, to sell as a fund raiser. The hospital was able to sell the yacht that same year for US$65,000. Potomac was then registered in 1967 to Marie Augustina Pagliasso of Sanger, California with the call sign WA9710. In January 1970, the vessel was out of documentation. It was rumored that there were plans to turn the yacht into a floating disco.

=== 1980–present ===
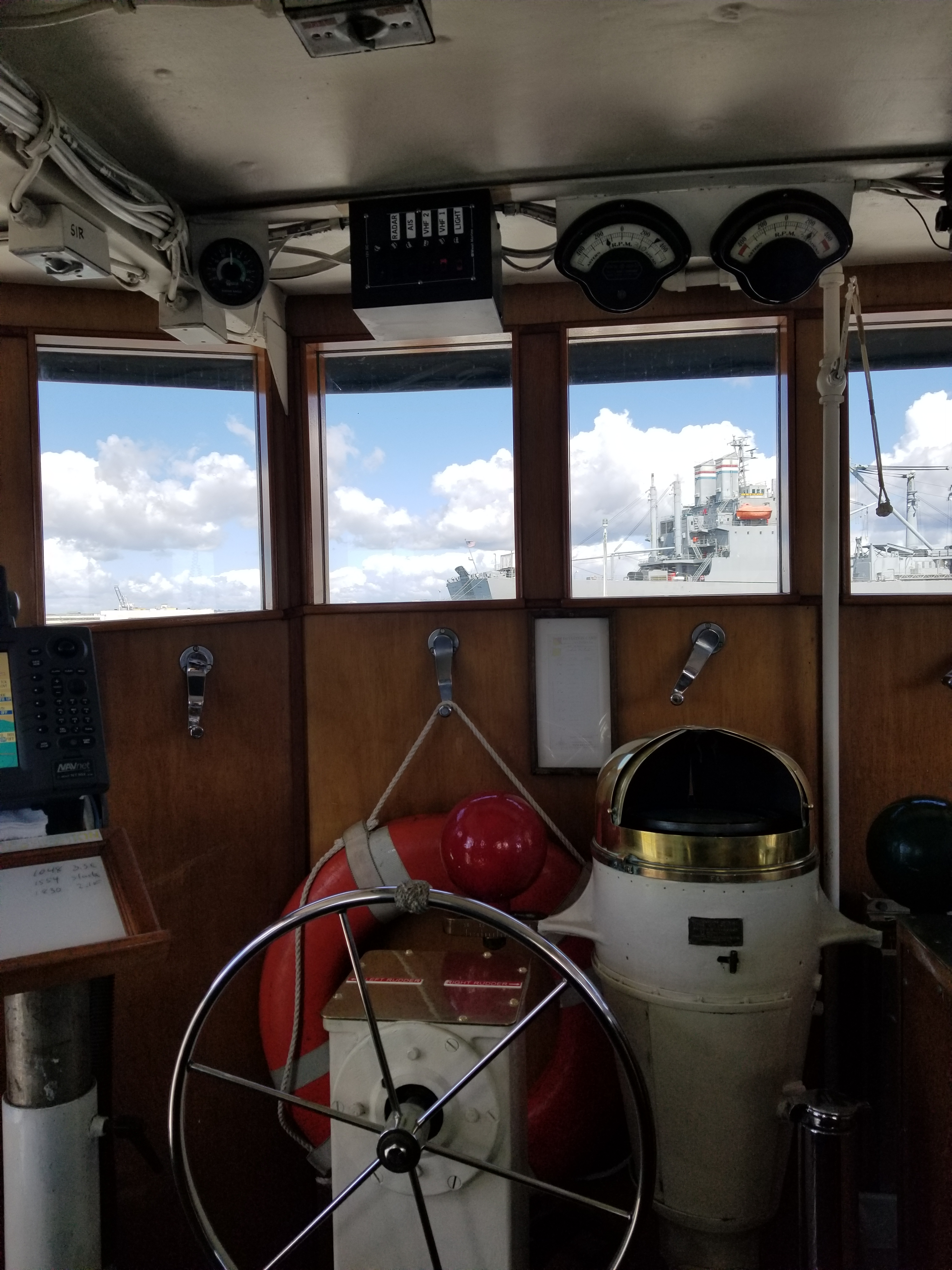
Inside the wheelhouse of USS Potomac

In 1980, Potomac was involved in a large-scale drug-running operation in Mexico, which led to a drug bust at San Francisco's Pier 26. No drugs were found aboard the yacht, but drugs were found aboard the yacht it had been traveling with. Potomac was seized by the United States Customs Service and towed to nearby Treasure Island, where she sank.

The vessel is said to have sunk due to a hull that had not been properly maintained and experienced thinning. It had been taking in water for some time.

After being refloated by the U.S. Navy just two weeks later, Potomac was sold to the first and only bidder, the nearby Port of Oakland, for $15,000.

==== Association for the Preservation of the Presidential Yacht Potomac ====
The non-profit Association for the Preservation of the Presidential Yacht Potomac, also known as the Potomac Association, was formed in 1983 to restore and operate the yacht. With a $2.5 million government grant, James Roosevelt, FDR's eldest son, and the Association began restoring Potomac. In April 1993, she sailed her first cruise as a restored vessel. The yacht became a culturally significant attraction in Oakland when it was opened to the public at Jack London Square in the summer of 1995.

A team of volunteers, crew and donors work to uphold the legacy of the historic presidential yacht. She continues to be berthed at Jack London Square and preserved by the Potomac Association, chaired by Michael Roosevelt, a grandson of FDR. She is open to dockside tours and regular cruises on San Francisco Bay.

== In popular culture ==
Potomac was used in June 2011 to film shipboard scenes of the Paul Thomas Anderson film The Master. Actors Joaquin Phoenix, Philip Seymour Hoffman, Amy Adams and others shot scenes aboard the yacht while docked and under way.

== Awards ==
- American Defense Service Medal
- American Campaign Medal
- World War II Victory Medal

== See also ==
- USS Sequoia (presidential yacht)
- List of official vehicles of the president of the United States, which includes the other presidential yachts
