= German submarine U-157 (1941) =

German World War II submarine

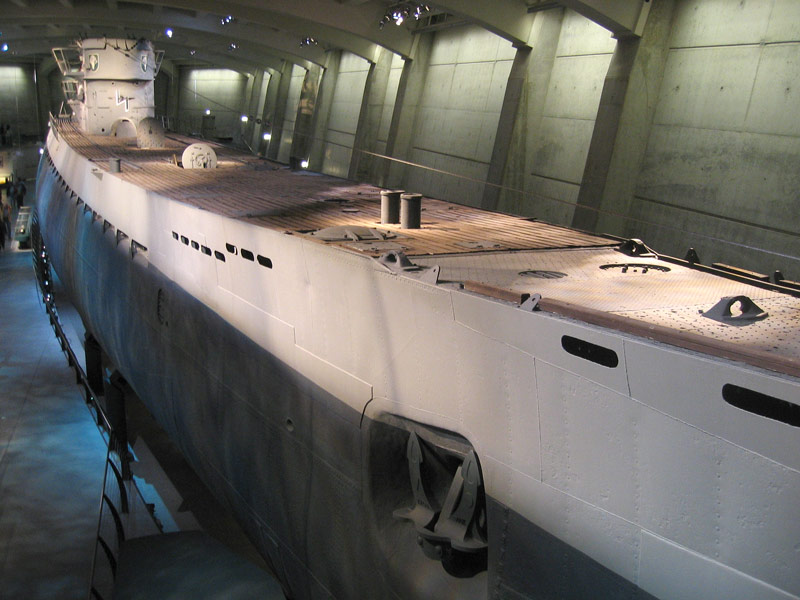
- U-505, a typical Type IXC boat

History

Nazi Germany
- Name: U-157
- Ordered: 25 September 1939
- Builder: DeSchiMAG AG Weser, Bremen
- Yard number: 999
- Laid down: 21 October 1940
- Launched: 5 June 1941
- Commissioned: 15 September 1941
- Fate: Sunk, 13 June 1942

General characteristics
- Class & type: Type IXC submarine
- Displacement: 1,120 t (1,100 long tons) surfaced; 1,232 t (1,213 long tons) submerged
- Length: 76.76 m (251 ft 10 in) o/a; 58.75 m (192 ft 9 in) pressure hull
- Beam: 6.76 m (22 ft 2 in) o/a; 4.40 m (14 ft 5 in) pressure hull
- Height: 9.60 m (31 ft 6 in)
- Draught: 4.70 m (15 ft 5 in)
- Installed power: 4,400 PS (3,200 kW; 4,300 bhp) (diesels); 1,000 PS (740 kW; 990 shp) (electric)
- Propulsion: 2 shafts; 2 × diesel engines; 2 × electric motors
- Speed: 18.3 knots (33.9 km/h; 21.1 mph) surfaced; 7.7 knots (14.3 km/h; 8.9 mph) submerged
- Range: 13,450 nmi (24,910 km; 15,480 mi) at 10 knots (19 km/h; 12 mph) surfaced; 64 nmi (119 km; 74 mi) at 4 knots (7.4 km/h; 4.6 mph) submerged
- Test depth: 230 m (750 ft)
- Complement: 48 to 56
- Armament: 6 × torpedo tubes (4 bow, 2 stern); 22 × 53.3 cm (21 in) torpedoes; 1 × 10.5 cm (4.1 in) SK C/32 deck gun (180 rounds); 1 × 3.7 cm (1.5 in) SK C/30 AA gun; 1 × 2 cm FlaK 30 AA guns

Service record
- Part of: 4th U-boat Flotilla; 15 September 1941 – 31 May 1942; 2nd U-boat Flotilla; 1 – 13 June 1942
- Identification codes: M 13 974
- Commanders: K.Kapt. Wolf Henne; 15 September 1941 – 13 June 1942
- Operations: 2 patrols: 1st patrol: 30 April – 10 May 1942; 2nd patrol: 18 May – 13 June 1942
- Victories: 1 merchant ship sunk (6,401 GRT)

German submarine U-157 was a Type IXC U-boat of Nazi Germany's Kriegsmarine during World War II. The submarine was laid down on 21 October 1940 at the DeSchiMAG AG Weser yard in Bremen, launched on 5 June 1941, and commissioned on 15 September under the command of Korvettenkapitän Wolf Henne. After training with the 4th U-boat Flotilla, U-157 was transferred to the 2nd U-boat Flotilla for front-line service on 3 June 1942.

== Design ==
German Type IXC submarines were slightly larger than the original Type IXBs. U-157 had a displacement of 1,120 tonnes (1,100 long tons) when at the surface and 1,232 tonnes (1,213 long tons) while submerged. The U-boat had a total length of 76.76 m (251 ft 10 in), a pressure hull length of 58.75 m (192 ft 9 in), a beam of 6.76 m (22 ft 2 in), a height of 9.60 m (31 ft 6 in), and a draught of 4.70 m (15 ft 5 in). The submarine was powered by two MAN M 9 V 40/46 supercharged four-stroke, nine-cylinder diesel engines producing a total of 4,400 metric horsepower (3,240 kW; 4,340 shp) for use while surfaced, two Siemens-Schuckert 2 GU 345/34 double-acting electric motors producing a total of 1,000 metric horsepower (740 kW; 990 shp) for use while submerged. She had two shafts and two 1.92 m (6 ft) propellers. The boat was capable of operating at depths of up to 230 metres (750 ft).

The submarine had a maximum surface speed of 18.3 knots (33.9 km/h; 21.1 mph) and a maximum submerged speed of 7.3 knots (13.5 km/h; 8.4 mph). When submerged, the boat could operate for 63 nautical miles (117 km; 72 mi) at 4 knots (7.4 km/h; 4.6 mph); when surfaced, she could travel 13,450 nautical miles (24,910 km; 15,480 mi) at 10 knots (19 km/h; 12 mph). U-157 was fitted with six 53.3 cm (21 in) torpedo tubes (four fitted at the bow and two at the stern), 22 torpedoes, one 10.5 cm (4.13 in) SK C/32 naval gun, 180 rounds, and a 3.7 cm (1.5 in) SK C/30 as well as a 2 cm (0.79 in) C/30 anti-aircraft gun. The boat had a complement of forty-eight.

== Service history ==
=== First patrol ===
U-157 sailed from Kiel on 30 April 1942, around the British Isles, and arrived at Lorient, France, eleven days later on 10 May.

=== Second patrol ===
The U-boat left Lorient on 18 May 1942 and sailed across the Atlantic to the Caribbean Sea. There, on 11 June, she torpedoed and sank the unescorted 6,401 GRT American tanker Hagan about five miles off the north coast of Cuba. The ship, loaded with 22,676 barrels of blackstrap molasses, was hit in the engine room, destroying the engines and causing at least one boiler to explode. About a minute later a second torpedo struck, and the tanker began to sink by the stern. The crew abandoned ship in two lifeboats, but two officers and four crewmen were lost. The boats, containing 38 men, both landed in Cuba.

=== Fate ===
U-157 was sunk two days later, on 13 June 1942, south-west of Key West, Florida, in position 24°13′N 82°03′W, by depth charges from USCGC Thetis, a U.S. Coast Guard cutter assigned to the Eastern Sea Frontier Squadron at Key West. All 52 crew were lost.

== Summary of raiding history ==
Date	Name	Nationality	Tonnage (GRT)	Fate
11 June 1942	Hagan	United States	6,401	Sunk
