= USS Abarenda (IX-131) =

US Navy storage tanker (1916–1943)

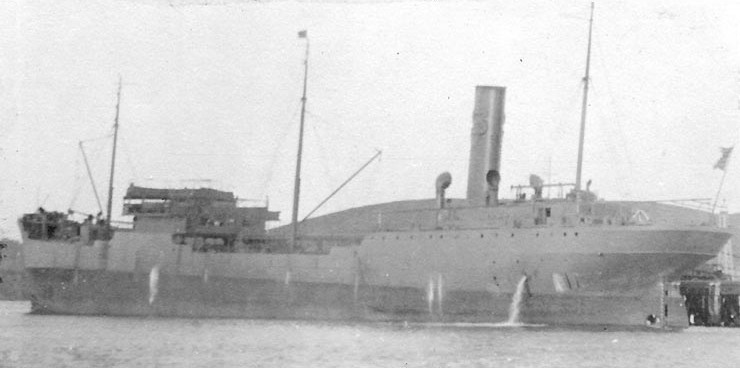
- SS Acme when she was inspected by the Twelfth Naval District in December 1917.

History

United States
- Name: Acme
- Namesake: Acme Oil Company
- Owner: Standard Transportation Company, Inc., New York City (1916–1931); Standard-Vacuum Transportation Company, Inc., New York (1931–1935); Socony-Vacuum Oil Company, Inc., New York (1935–1942); War Shipping Administration (1942–1943)
- Builder: Union Iron Works, San Francisco, California
- Yard number: 125
- Laid down: 1916
- Launched: 29 April 1916
- Commissioned: 22 June 1916
- Identification: Official number: 214173; LGCM (radio call sign)
- Fate: Requisitioned by the WSA 3 November 1943
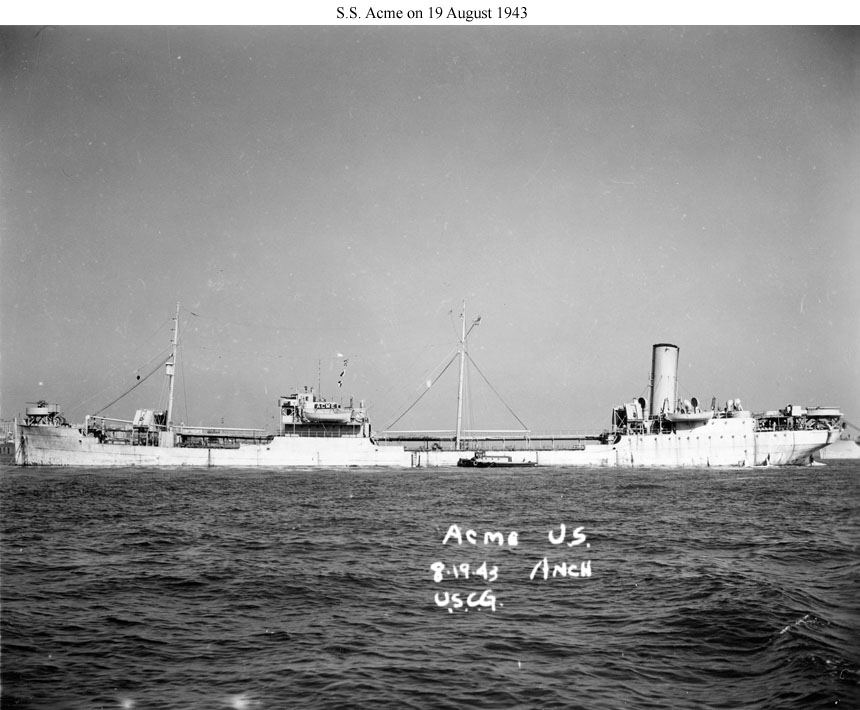
- SS Acme at anchor, 19 August 1943, location unknown, shortly before being acquired by the USN.

History

United States
- Name: Abarenda
- Acquired: 26 February 1944
- Commissioned: 18 April 1944
- Decommissioned: 28 February 1946
- Renamed: 3 November 1943
- Stricken: 20 March 1946
- Identification: Hull symbol: IX-131; Code letters: NJMT
- Fate: Scrapped at Shanghai, 1948

General characteristics
- Class & type: tanker (design became EFC Design 1047)
- Type: Floating storage tanker
- Tonnage: 6,895 GRT (Acme 1918)
- Displacement: 19,410 long tons (19,720 t)
- Length: 435 ft (133 m)
- Beam: 56 ft (17 m)
- Draft: 25 ft 6 in (7.77 m)
- Installed power: 3 × Single-ended Scotch boilers; 2,500 shp (1,900 kW)
- Propulsion: 1 × Vertical triple-expansion steam engine; 1 × screw
- Speed: 10.2 kn (18.9 km/h; 11.7 mph)
- Complement: 10 officer 110 enlisted

The second USS Abarenda (IX-131) was a storage tanker, one of many miscellaneous-class Navy vessel crewed by the United States Coast Guard during World War II. The ship was built as Acme in 1916 and operated commercially in the Pacific through the war. After the war, Acme operated in U.S. waters between Texas and Atlantic coast ports. Early in WW II the tanker was torpedoed with loss of eleven crew. The ship, undergoing repairs, was delivered to the War Shipping Administration (WSA) which operated the ship under various charter agreements including bareboat charter to the U.S. Navy which renamed the ship Abarenda designated IX-131. Until February 1946 the tanker fueled ship in the Philippines and was then decommissioned, returned to WSA and laid up in WSA's reserve fleet there until sold for scrapping in January 1948.

== Design and construction ==
Acme was an oil tanker laid down in 1916 by the Union Iron Works in San Francisco for the Standard Transportation Company, Inc., launched 29 April 1916 and delivered for service 22 June 1916. Though naval and other records that may be derivative show the tanker as a United States Shipping Board (established 7 September 1916) vessel of the Emergency Fleet Corporation (established 16 April 1917) Design 1047 the ship was launched before either organization existed. The design of Acme and sister tankers was adopted by the EFC as Design 1047.

Acme was registered with call sign LGCM at 6,895 GRT, 435 ft (132.6 m) length between perpendiculars, 56 ft (17.1 m) beam with crew of 35 and indicated horsepower of 2,600 and home port of New York, New York with owner Standard Transportation Company.

Acme was designed for transporting oil in bulk to Far Eastern ports that had been served by British ships before the outbreak of World War I. She, along with four more ships that were to follow her, had been designated "A" boats by the Marine Transportation Department.

== Service history ==
=== World War I ===
During World War I, Acme filled in for British ship that had been commandeered by the British Admiralty. Her first voyage was to China. She would continue her San Francisco to China route for the next five years with only rare trips to New York for loads to Singapore via the Suez Canal. After the United States entered World War I, only Acme and two of her sister ships were available for Standard Transportation to use in the Pacific, this was mainly because on her return trips she would load coconut oil in the Philippines, which because of its 12 percent glycerin content made it a valuable war cargo. The tanker was inspected in the Twelfth Naval District and assigned the identification number (Id. No.) 2103 but was not taken for naval service.

=== Post war service ===
Acme started running a route from the "Texas-oil-coast" to "ports-north-of-Hatteras" in 1925. She changed owners in 1931 and 1935, but she didn't change names.

=== World War II ===
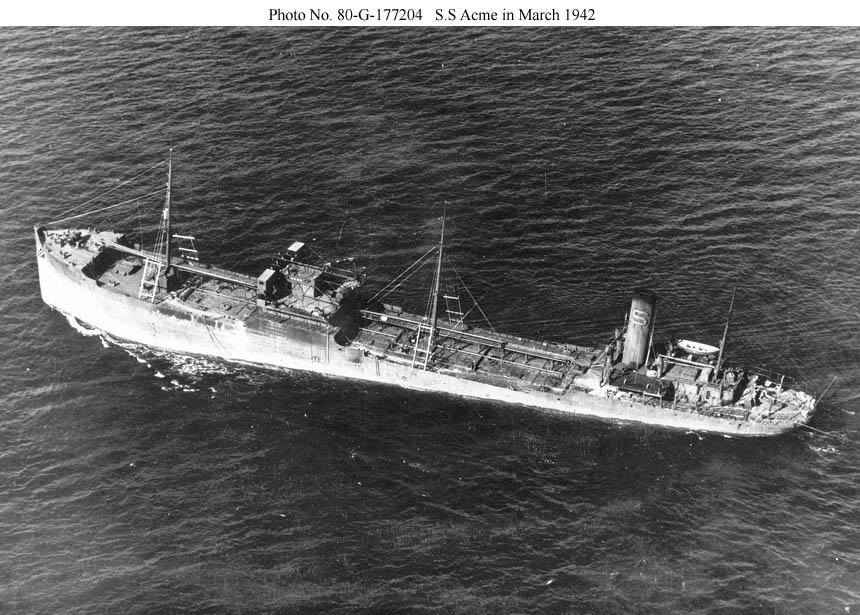
SS Acme under tow after being torpedoed in the stern on 17 March 1942 by U-124 off North Carolina. She was abandoned by her crew but was later towed by Navy and Coast Guard vessels to Lynnhaven Roads, VA., and then to Newport News for repairs.

Acme was sailing for Corpus Christi, Texas, from New York, on 17 March 1942, about 1 nmi (1.9 km; 1.2 mi) west of Diamond Shoal Light, North Carolina, (35.05°N 75.20°W) when she was damaged by a torpedo from U-124. Eleven of her crew were killed with the surviving 20 abandoning ship. They were rescued by USCGC Dione and landed at Norfolk, Virginia, with Acme being towed to Lynnhaven Roads, Virginia, and later to Newport News, Virginia, for repairs. The War Shipping Administration requisitioned her about a month later while she was still in dock.

After repairs Acme served in transatlantic convoys, with deliveries of fuel to Guantanamo Bay Naval Base, on occasion.

In September 1943, the WSA obtained full title to Acme when they traded six obsolete tankers for three new tankers.

In anticipation of her acquisition by the Navy, Acme was renamed Abarenda on 3 November 1943 and simultaneously classified IX-131. She was purchased by the Navy on 26 February 1944 and commissioned on 18 April 1944.

Abarenda was assigned to Service Squadron 10 as a floating storage tanker. She served at Manus Island in the Admiralty Islands and was damaged there by the November 1944 USS Mount Hood (AE-11) explosion. On 20 February 1945 she headed for the Philippines. The tanker arrived at Leyte on 13 March and, for the remainder of the War, dispensed fuel to the warships of the 3d/5th Fleet.

=== Post war and decommissioning ===
Following the end of World War II, Abarenda fueled the ships supporting the occupation forces in the Far East and continued that duty until 28 February 1946 at which time she was decommissioned in the Philippines. Returned to the WSA that day, she was berthed with that organization's reserve fleet at Subic Bay. Her name was struck from the Navy list on 20 March 1946 and she resumed the name Acme while in the WSA reserve fleet.

Sold on 29 January 1948 to the Asia Development Corp., Shanghai, China, along with 15 other vessels, for scrapping, she was delivered to her purchaser on 3 March 1948.
