= USS St. Augustine =

Gunboat of the United States Navy

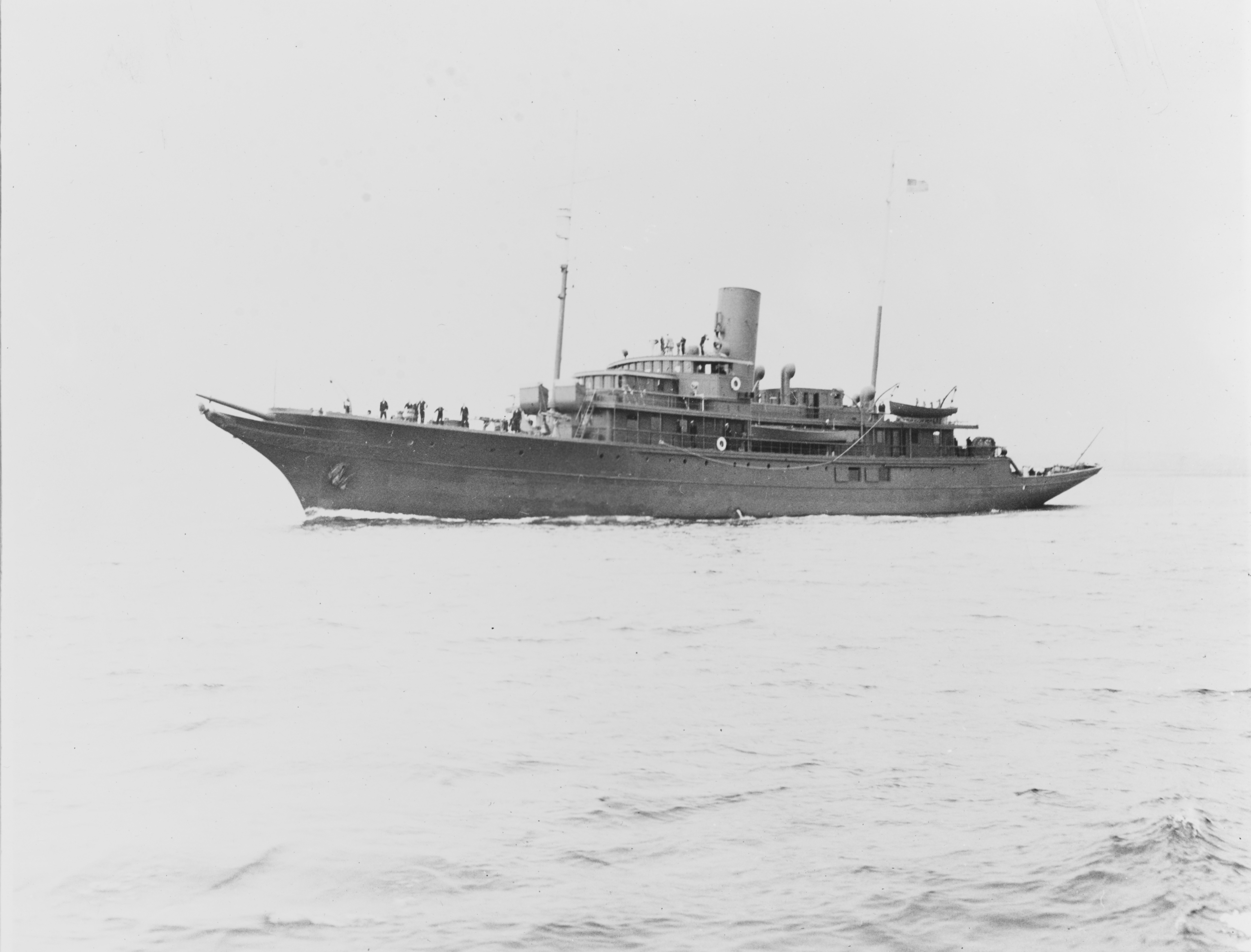
- USS St. Augustine

History

United States
- Name: Viking
- Namesake: Viking
- Owner: George L. Baker
- Builder: Newport News Shipbuilding and Dry Dock Co., Newport News, Virginia
- Cost: $1,250,000
- Launched: 1929
- Fate: Sold in 1938

United States
- Name: Noparo
- Namesake: An acronym blending parts of the first names of the owners three children (Norman, Pamela and Robert)
- Owner: Norman B. Woolworth
- Acquired: 1938
- Fate: Acquired by the US Navy, 5 December 1940

United States
- Name: USS St. Augustine
- Namesake: St. Augustine, Florida
- Builder: Bethlehem Steel Corp., Boston, Massachusetts (Conversion)
- Acquired: 5 December 1940
- Commissioned: 16 January 1941
- Stricken: 22 January 1944
- Fate: Sunk in collision, 6 January 1944

General characteristics (USS St. Augustine)
- Type: Patrol gunboat
- Displacement: Full: 1,720 long tons (1,748 t)
- Length: 272 ft 2 in (82.96 m)
- Beam: 36 ft (11 m)
- Draft: 14 ft 6 in (4.42 m)
- Propulsion: Turbo-electric; 2 × shafts
- Speed: 14 knots (16 mph; 26 km/h)
- Complement: 185
- Armament: 2 × 3 in (76 mm)/50 cal guns

USS St. Augustine (PG-54) was a patrol gunboat of the United States Navy during World War II, originally built in 1929 as the steel-hulled yacht Viking (later named Noparo).

== History ==
USS St. Augustine (PG-54) was built in 1929 by Newport News Shipbuilding and Dry Dock Co. in Newport News, Virginia. She was originally a steel-hulled yacht named Viking and later named Noparo. She was purchased by the US Navy on 5 December 1940 and was sent to Bethlehem Steel Corp. in Boston, Massachusetts where she was converted into a patrol gunboat. She was named St. Augustine on 9 January 1941 and commissioned as USS St. Augustine on 16 January 1941.

St. Augustine was assigned to the 1st Naval District and operated out of Boston as a patrol ship until 1942. She was transferred to the Eastern Sea Frontier where she escorted convoys between New York City and various Caribbean ports. On the night of 6 January 1944, while leading a convoy from New York to Guantanamo Bay, Cuba, St. Augustine was accidentally rammed by merchant tanker Camas Meadows off the coast of Cape May, New Jersey. St. Augustine foundered within five minutes, and 115 of the 145 crewmembers on board were killed.
