= SS India Arrow =

Steam tanker built in 1921

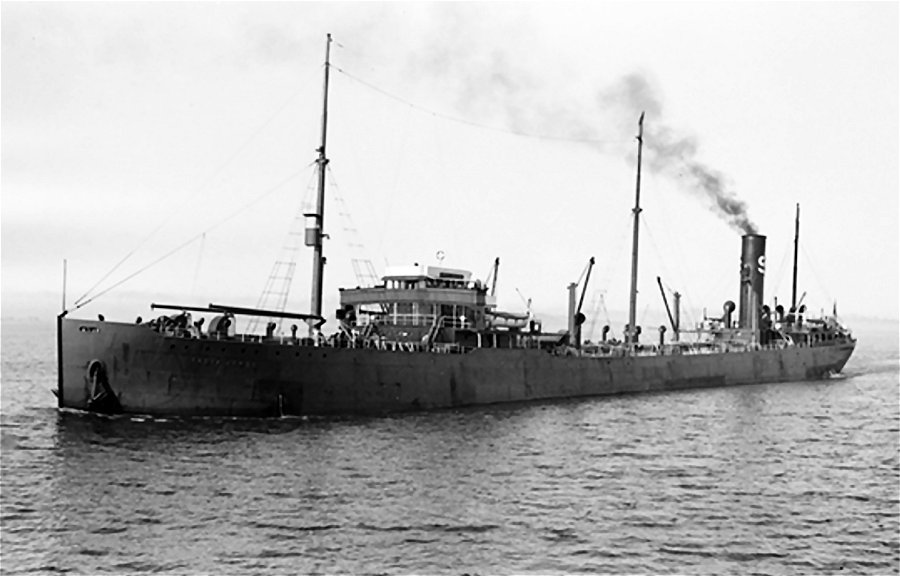

History

United States
- Name: India Arrow
- Owner: Standard Oil Co. (1918–1930); Socony-Vacuum Oil Co. (1930–1942)
- Operator: Standard Transportation Company (1920–1931); Standard-Vacuum Transportation Company (1931–1935); Socony-Vacuum Oil Co. (1935–1942)
- Builder: Bethlehem Shipbuilding Corp., Quincy
- Yard number: 1387
- Laid down: 3 March 1920
- Launched: 28 January 1921
- Sponsored by: Mrs. Harry Dundas
- Completed: 24 February 1921
- Commissioned: 17 March 1921
- Maiden voyage: 21 October 1921
- Home port: New York
- Identification: US Official Number 221086; Code letters MCLT (1918–1933); Call sign KDHP (1934–1942)
- Fate: Sunk, 4 February 1942

General characteristics
- Class & type: Arrow-class oil tanker
- Tonnage: 8,327 GRT; 5,176 NRT; 12,290 DWT
- Length: 468.3 ft (142.7 m)
- Beam: 62.7 ft (19.1 m)
- Draft: 28 ft 2 in (8.59 m) (mean)
- Depth: 32.0 ft (9.8 m)
- Installed power: 636 nhp, 3,200 ihp (2,400 kW)
- Propulsion: Bethlehem Shipbuilding Corp. 4-cylinder quadruple-expansion steam engine
- Speed: 11 knots (20 km/h; 13 mph)

SS India Arrow was a steam Arrow-class oil tanker built in 1921 by Bethlehem Shipbuilding Corporation of Quincy, Massachusetts for Standard Oil Co., with intention of transporting oil and petroleum products between the United States and the Far East. During the first eight years the tanker was chiefly employed in the Pacific trade, carrying cargo between Gulf ports and a variety of destinations in East Asia. In late 1920s the tanker was moved to serve intercoastal trade routes while still making occasional trips to Asia. In early 1930s she was permanently assigned to trade routes between the Gulf and the ports on the United States East Coast, where she remained for the rest of her career.

India Arrow was torpedoed and sunk by the German submarine U-103 in February 1942 during one of her routine trips from Texas to New York. Twenty-six of her crew died as a result.

== Design and construction ==
Early in 1919, Standard Oil Co. decided to add four more tankers of approximately 12,500 deadweight tonnage to its existing fleet, expanding their oil-carrying business. A contract for these vessels was awarded to the Bethlehem Shipbuilding Corporation. India Arrow was the third of these four ships (China Arrow, Japan Arrow and Java Arrow being the other three) and was laid down at the Fore River Shipyard in Quincy on 3 March 1920 (yard number 1387) and launched on 28 January 1921, with Mrs. Harry Dundas, wife of the general manager of the British India branch of the Standard Transportation Company, serving as the sponsor. The ship was shelter-deck type, had two main decks and was built on the Isherwood principle of longitudinal framing providing extra strength to the body of the vessel. The tanker had a cargo pump room located amidships, and had ten double main cargo tanks constructed throughout the vessel with a total capacity to carry approximately 3,665,700 US gallons of oil. The ship was equipped with wireless of De Forest type and had electric lights installed along the decks.

As built, the ship was 468.3 feet (142.7 metres) long (between perpendiculars) and 62.7 ft (19.1 m) abeam, and had a depth of 32.0 ft (9.8 m). India Arrow was originally assessed at 8,327 gross register tons (GRT) and 5,176 net register tons (NRT) and carried approximate deadweight tonnage of 12,290 on a mean draft of 28 feet 2 inches (8.59 m). The vessel had a steel hull, and a single 636 Nhp (3,200 ihp) vertical surface-condensing direct-acting reciprocating quadruple-expansion steam engine made by Bethlehem Shipbuilding Corp., with cylinders of 24-inch (61-centimetre), 35 in (89 cm), 51 in (130 cm) and 75 in (190 cm) diameter with a 51 in (130 cm) stroke, that drove a single-screw propeller and moved the ship at up to 11 knots (13 mph; 20 km/h). The steam for the engine was supplied by three single-ended Scotch marine boilers fitted for oil fuel.

The sea trials were held on 25 and 26 February 1921 in the Massachusetts Bay during which the vessel performed satisfactorily. Following their completion the tanker returned to Boston and upon adding finishing touches was transferred to her owners on 17 March 1921.

== Operational history ==
After delivery to Standard Oil in March 1921, India Arrow remained berthed in Boston for the next six months due to overabundance of available tonnage and scarcity of cargo. She sailed from Boston to New York in mid-October for loading and departed for Hong Kong on 21 October 1921 carrying 10,800 tons of kerosene. After stopping at San Francisco for fuel in mid-November, the vessel reached her destination on December 17. After unloading her cargo the tanker proceeded to Penang to load a cargo of oil and then continued on to Rotterdam which she reached on 17 February 1922 before returning to New York on March 14, thus successfully concluding her maiden voyage.

After conducting one more trip to the Far East and several trips between Gulf ports of Texas and New York, India Arrow departed Sabine on 20 October 1922 bound for Colombo. After discharging her cargo there in December, the tanker returned to New York on 22 January 1923, thereby completing another round-the-world journey. During 1923 the tanker alternated trips from Gulf ports to China and New York. From late 1923 until 1927 the vessel was primarily employed to transport petroleum products from the refineries of Southern California to Chinese, and occasionally Japanese, ports.

In September 1923, the tanker stumbled across her sister Standard Arrow in the Pacific Ocean, damaged due to a storm. India Arrow towed her sister ship 800 miles (1,300 km) to Yokahama, Japan.

In February 1925, India Arrow, while on her regular trip to Shanghai, ran into some rough weather and was hit by a huge wave which washed away both the forward and after wheelhouses, caused other damage about the decks and injured several crew members. The tanker managed to safely reach her destination where she was repaired before resuming her normal service. Starting in 1927 the tanker was mainly used on two intercoastal routes transporting either petroleum products from San Pedro to New York or oil from various Texas ports to several ports along the East Coast of the United States such as Baltimore, New York, Boston and Providence.

On 30 December 1927 India Arrow and several other ships were berthed in Hoboken, when a fire started in the plant of Union Ship Scaling Company and quickly spread along the pier. As the fire advanced, the steamers SS Seneca and SS Hendrik Hudson also caught fire, while several other vessels were pulled away from their berthing positions up the river to save them from spreading flames. At the time India Arrow was high and dry ready to go into dry dock for repairs. She was let down the slipway immediately once the fire was noticed and then dragged away up-stream for safety. Seneca completely burned down in the fire and was declared a total loss, while Hendrik Hudson had her bow charred but did not suffer further damage.

While being mainly employed in the intercoastal trade, she continued to make occasional trips to the Far East and other foreign destinations. For example, India Arrow sailed from Beaumont in May 1928 carrying a full cargo of gasoline to Colombo, Madras and Calcutta. On 18 April 1929 the tanker arrived at Colón from San Pedro with one of her summer tanks leaking. After transferring her cargo into another tank, India Arrow was able to proceed to her destination the next day. In 1931 the vessel conducted another round-the-world trip departing Beaumont in April and returning to San Pedro in late August after first delivering oil to Colombo and then from Batum to Hong Kong. In October 1934 she was chartered for one trip to carry oil from Tampico to Aruba. The tanker then returned to her usual trade of carrying crude oil from the terminals of Magnolia Petroleum Company in Beaumont, Humble Oil in Corpus Christi, and Texas Company in Port Arthur and Port Neches to the refineries in the Northeast of the United States. The vessel remained in that role through the end of her career. In November 1938 India Arrow was one of the tankers chartered by the United States Navy to bring high-octane gasoline from Beaumont to Yorktown.

=== Sinking ===
India Arrow departed for her last voyage from Corpus Christi on 27 January 1942 carrying 88,369 barrels of diesel fuel bound for New York. The tanker was under command of captain Carl Samuel Johnson and had a crew of nine officers and twenty nine men. In the evening of February 4 the tanker was approximately 35 nautical miles (65 km) off Five Fathom Bank, a bar just east of North Wildwood, and running a non-evasive course. At approximately 18:45 local time the ship was suddenly struck on her starboard side by a single torpedo fired by German U-boat U-103 around the #10 hold, just aft of the engine room. The resulting explosion threw several people overboard and immediately set the ship on fire. The radio operator was able to send a short S.O.S. signal before a complete loss of engine power caused the electrical dynamo to go dead. The crew was able to lower only two out of vessel's four lifeboats as the ship was rapidly sinking. The captain and two other crewmen got into one lifeboat and managed to safely get away from the stricken tanker. A dozen more crewmembers got into the second lifeboat; it never emerged, however, and most likely was crushed under the keel of the sinking tanker. Nine people were lifted from the water into the lone remaining lifeboat bringing the total number of survivors to twelve. U-103 soon surfaced approximately 250 yards away, and proceeded to fire six to seven shots into the bow section of the ship setting it also on fire. India Arrow sank quickly stern first in an approximate position 38°33′30.5″N 73°50′04.5″W at about 19:00 local time.

After receiving the distress call from India Arrow—but no location coordinates—the 5th Naval District requested the tanker's estimated position from the ship owners, and upon receiving the information dispatched patrol boat Tourmaline to search for survivors in the early afternoon of February 5. Several planes were also dispatched from the Norfolk Air Station. After locating the wreck with her bow still protruding out of the water, Tourmaline searched the area but found no survivors. In the meantime, the survivors started rowing towards the shore as they could clearly see the reflected lights of Atlantic City in the distance. After a thirty-six hour long struggle against the wind and the waves, they were finally spotted by captain Marshall of the 24-foot long fishing motor boat Gitama about 12 nautical miles (22 km) offshore and taken to Ocean City where they arrived at 08:55 on February 6.
