= Backhaul =

Backhaul may refer to:

- Backhaul (telecommunications), in telecommunications, concerned with transporting traffic between distributed sites (typically access points) and more centralized points of presence
- Backhaul (broadcasting), in the broadcast TV industry, the point-to-point transmission, usually by satellite, of a feed from a remote location to the studio
- Backhaul (trucking), in the transportation world, when a truck takes a load back to its originating terminal, e.g. to get a driver home
