= USS Standard Arrow =

American oil tanker (1916–1946)

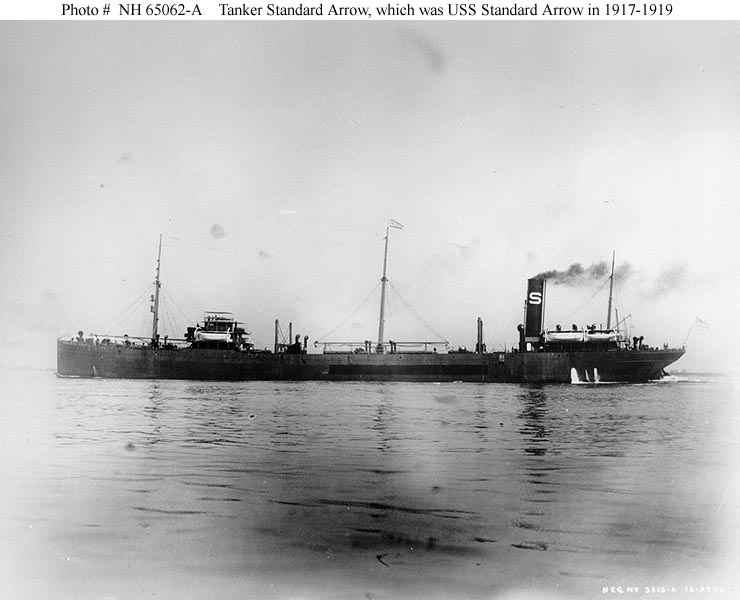
- SS Standard Arrow in commercial service, probably prior to her U.S. Navy service.

History
- Name: 1916: Standard Arrow; 1944: Signal; 1946: Standard Arrow
- Owner: Standard Oil Company
- Operator: 1916: Standard Oil Company; 1917–19: U.S. Navy, as USS Standard Arrow (ID-1532); 1944–46: U.S. Navy, as USS Signal (IX-142)
- Port of registry: United States
- Builder: New York Shipbuilding Company, Camden, New Jersey
- Yard number: 167
- Launched: 15 May 1916
- Completed: August 1916
- Commissioned: 22 August 1917, as USS Standard Arrow
- Decommissioned: 29 January 1919
- Renamed: USS Signal, April 1944
- Commissioned: 4 April 1944, as USS Signal
- Decommissioned: c. 20 February 1946
- Renamed: Standard Arrow
- Stricken: 12 March 1946
- Fate: Scrapped, April 1947

General characteristics as USS Standard Arrow
- Class & type: Arrow-class oil tanker
- Tonnage: 7,794 GRT
- Displacement: 18,275 long tons (18,568 t)
- Length: 485 ft 3 in (147.90 m)
- Beam: 62 ft 7 in (19.08 m)
- Draft: 27 ft (8.2 m)
- Propulsion: Steam engine
- Speed: 12 knots (22 km/h; 14 mph)
- Complement: 86
- Armament: 2 × 5 in (130 mm) guns

General characteristics as USS Signal
- Displacement: 15,333 long tons (15,579 t)
- Length: 485 ft (148 m)
- Beam: 62 ft 6 in (19.05 m)
- Draft: 27 ft (8.2 m)
- Installed power: 2,000 shp (1,500 kW)
- Propulsion: Three S. E. Scotch boilers; one vertical quadruple-expansion steam engine, 220 pounds per square inch (1,500 kPa); one shaft
- Speed: 10.2 knots (18.9 km/h)
- Complement: 101 or 111
- Armament: 1 × 5 in (130 mm)/51-caliber gun mount; 1 × 3 in (76 mm)/50 gun mount

USS Standard Arrow (ID-1532) was a United States Navy tanker in commission from 1917 to 1919. She was built as SS Standard Arrow, the first of the Arrow class oil tankers, for the Standard Oil Company of New York (Socony). In World War II, she was again acquired by the U.S. Navy from Standard Oil and commissioned as USS Signal (IX-142) a station tanker in the Pacific from 1944 to 1946.

== Construction, acquisition, and commissioning ==
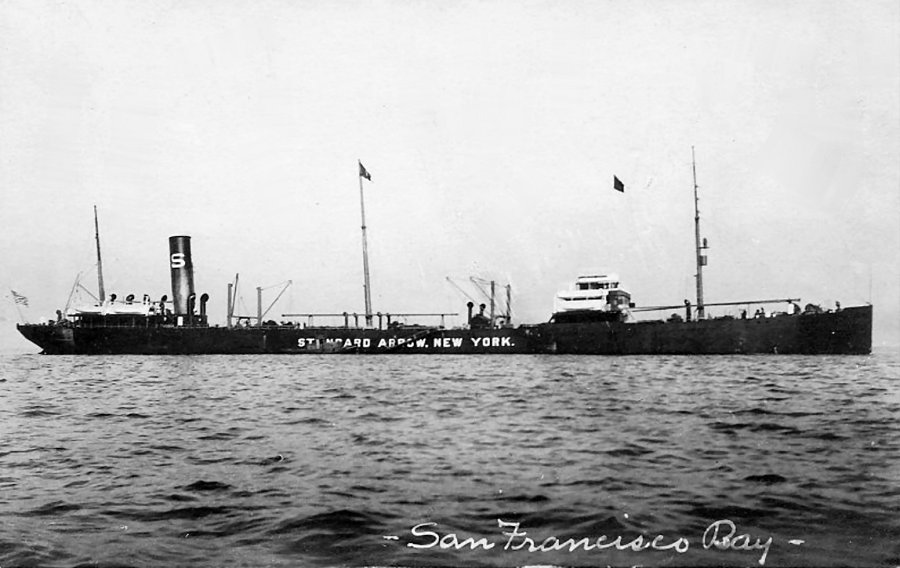
Standard Arrow prior to her acquisition

SS Standard Arrow was built as a commercial tanker in 1916 at Camden, New Jersey, by the New York Shipbuilding Company for the Standard Transportation Company of New York City.

The U.S. Navy acquired Standard Arrow from Standard Transportation under a bareboat charter on 22 August 1917 for use during World War I. She was assigned the Naval Registry Identification Number (Id. No.) 1532 and commissioned as USS Standard Arrow the same day at Mare Island Navy Yard in Vallejo, California.

== Operational history ==
=== United States Navy service as USS Standard Arrow, 1917-1919 ===
Standard Arrow was on a voyage from Devonport, England, to New York City when the Naval Overseas Transportation Service was established on 9 January 1918 and she was assigned to it. She arrived at New York on 19 January 1918 and was refitted for Navy duty. She then loaded a cargo of fuel oil and departed New York for Devonport on 4 February 1918. However, she collided with the tanker SS Norman Bridge that day, damaged her steering gear, and sprang a leak in her forward hold. She returned to port, discharged her cargo to tanker USS Maumee (AO-2), and was drydocked until 25 February 1918. Standard Arrow then replenished her cargo and sailed with a convoy for England, arriving at Portsmouth on 16 March 1918. Between that day and 17 December 1918, she made five additional trips to Europe.

Upon her arrival at New York City on 17 December 1918, Standard Arrow was scheduled for demobilization. She was decommissioned on 29 January 1919 and transferred to the United States Shipping Board.

=== Service with Socony ===
Standard Arrow led a boring and uninteresting career carrying petroleum products. In September 1923, Standard Arrow was damaged in a storm while sailing through the Pacific Ocean. She was located by her younger sister, India Arrow, and was towed 800 miles (1,300 km) to Yokahama, Japan, for repairs.

=== United States Navy service as USS Signal, 1944-1946 ===
The U.S. Navy again acquired Standard Arrow on 4 April 1944 for World War II service and commissioned her as the miscellaneous auxiliary USS Signal (IX-142) the same day.

Signal operated in the Pacific Ocean for the remainder of World War II, carrying and storing oil for Service Squadron 10, based at Majuro Atoll and Ulithi Atoll, and serving as station tanker at those atolls.

In February 1946, the Navy transferred Signal to the Maritime Commission, which placed her in its reserve fleet at Mobile, Alabama. She was returned to her owner on 20 February 1946 and her name was stricken from the Navy List on 12 March 1946.

=== Later career ===
Once again named SS Standard Arrow, she resumed commercial operations for about a year. The tanker was sold to H. H. Buncher company in early 1947. She was broken up in Mobile, Alabama, in April 1947, by Liberty Industrial Salvage Inc.
