= SS Java Arrow =

American oil tanker (1921–1959)

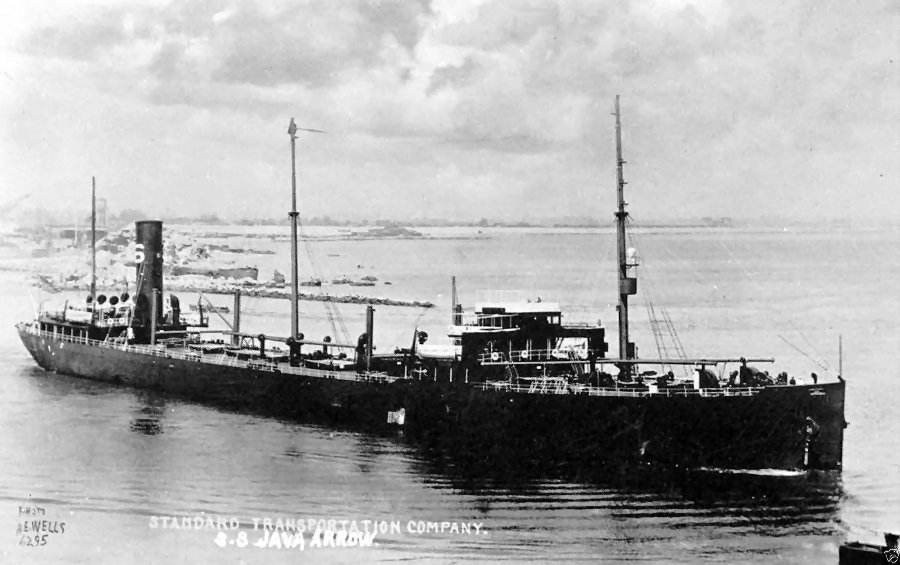
- Java Arrow in 1921

History

United States
- Name: Java Arrow (1921–1943); Kerry Patch (1943–1944; 1946–1948); Celtic (1944–1946); Radketch (1946–1949); Gale (1949–1955); Sugar (1955–1959)
- Owner: Socony (1921–1942); War Shipping Administration (1942–1943; 1946–1948); US Navy (1943–1946); Radocean Tanker Corporation (1948–1949); Radmar Trading Corporation (1949–1959); Cantieri Navali del Golfo (1959)
- Operator: Socony (1921–1943); US Navy (1943–1946); Radocean Tanker Corporation (1948–1949); Soc. Armadora Valenciana SA (1949–1955); Marine Charters Inc. (1955–1959); Cantieri Navali del Golfo (1959)
- Port of registry: New York, New York
- Builder: Bethlehem Shipbuilding Company, Quincy
- Yard number: 1388
- Launched: April 30, 1921
- Completed: May 24, 1921
- Commissioned: January 17, 1944
- Decommissioned: February 6, 1946
- In service: 1921–1959
- Renamed: 1943 (to Kerry Patch); 1944 (to Celtic); 1946 (to Kerry Patch); 1948 (to Radketch); 1949 (to Gale); 1955 (to Sugar)
- Homeport: New York, New York
- Identification: US official number: 221272; Naval identification: IX-137 (1944–1946)
- Fate: Broken up in La Spezia, March 1959

General characteristics
- Class and type: Arrow-class oil tanker
- Tonnage: 8,327 GRT; 13,325 DWT
- Displacement: 20,000 tons
- Length: 485 feet (148 m)
- Beam: 62.5 feet (19.1 m)
- Depth: 31.5 feet (9.6 m)
- Propulsion: 1 screw
- Speed: 10.6 knots (12.2 mph; 19.6 km/h)
- Complement: 114 men
- Armament: 1x 4"/50-caliber gun, 1x 3"/50-caliber gun, 8x Oerlikon 20mm guns (1944–1946)

SS Java Arrow was an American steam-powered oil tanker. She was built in 1921 as a member of the Arrow-class and was operated by the Standard Oil Company of New York (Socony) until World War II. The tanker was then operated by six different entities under five different names until 1959: Celtic, Kerry Patch, Radketch, Gale, and Sugar.

== Construction ==
Java Arrow constructed by the Bethlehem Steel Company in Quincy, Massachusetts as yard number 1388. The tanker was launched on April 30, 1921, and she entered service on May 24 of that same year. She was assigned the official number 221272, and was registered in New York.

=== Specifications ===
Java Arrow was 485 feet (148 m) long, 62.5 feet (19.1 m) wide, and had a depth of 31.5 feet (9.6 m). She was 8,327 gross register tons, 13,325 deadweight tons, and had a displacement of 20,000 tons. Her capacity was 99,742 barrels. She had a quadruple expansion steam engine capable of producing 3,200 horsepower. She had a maximum speed of 10.6 knots (12.2 mph; 19.6 km/h).

== Service history ==
=== Interwar ===
Java Arrow's very first voyage was to India via the Suez Canal, with a backhaul stop in Balikpapan, a city in the Dutch East Indies, while on her way to Europe. Java Arrow sailed East Asia until 1931, when she was transferred to the East Coast of the United States.

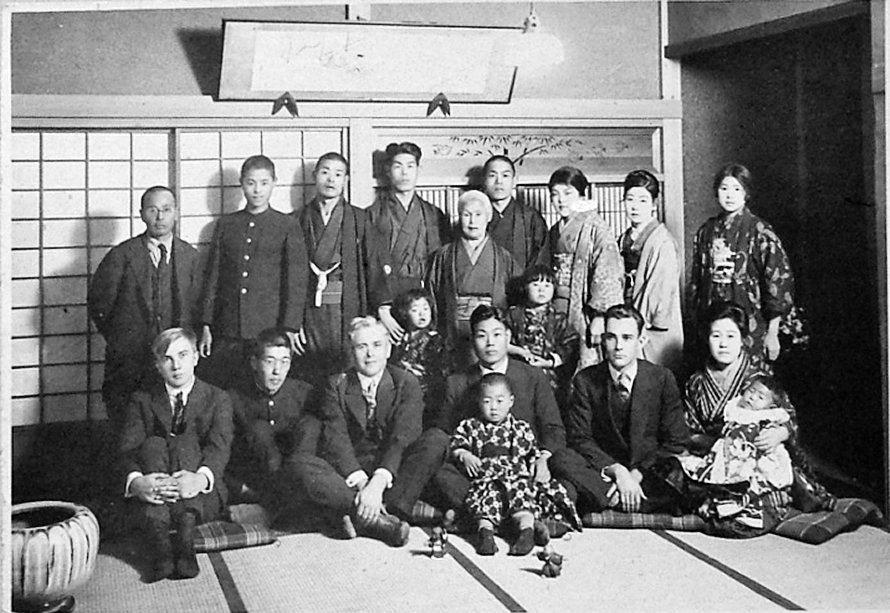
Crewmen from Java Arrow and Dashin Maru No. 3 in Japan, 1926

In February 1926, Java Arrow was sailing from Singapore to the United States when it discovered the wrecked Daishin Maru No. 3, a Japanese cargo ship. She had been caught in a storm in the Tsugaru Strait, which had exhausted the ship's fuel supply. She had drifted south for around six weeks, the crew eating rats caught by the ship's cat—and later the cat itself—to stay alive. Two or three weeks in, two lifeboats with 14 or 15 people had been launched in hopes of finding land—though they did not return. After her 17 crew members were rescued by Java Arrow via heaving lines, they were first taken to San Francisco and eventually back to Japan. The cargo ship was left as a derelict, later located by the Japanese government and taken to Yokohama for repairs.

=== World War II ===
Java Arrow was taken by the War Shipping Administration (WSA) in 1942 and placed into service with the United States Merchant Marine.

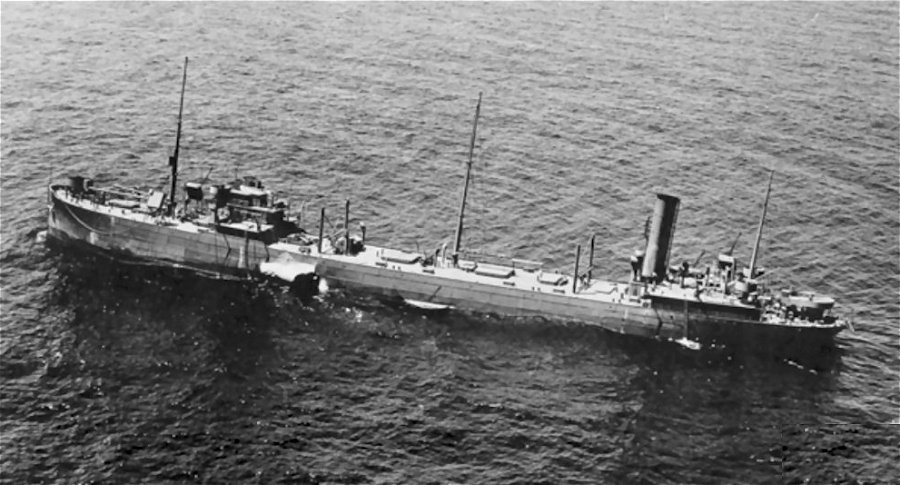
Java Arrow listing to starboard after being torpedoed; note the two torpedo holes on her port side

During her first voyage as a merchant mariner, Java Arrow was torpedoed by the German submarine U-333. Passing eight miles (13 km) off Vero Beach, Florida and sailing in ballast on May 5, 1942, two torpedoes were fired by U-333 at 5:43 AM. The first struck just aft of the bridge and the second struck the stern, demolishing the engine room, killing two officers, and causing the ship to stop. An SOS signal was sent out, listing Java Arrow's position as 27°35'N, 80°08'W. Most of the tanker's 45 men—seven officers, 32 crewmen, and six armed guards—abandoned her in a lifeboat after 20 minutes. The remaining crew followed just ten minutes later in a second lifeboat. Believing Java Arrow to be doomed, Captain Hennechin ordered the lifeboats to row away from the tanker. They were picked up on May 6 by USS PC-483 and taken to Miami and Fort Pierce.

The tanker was still afloat upon the arrival of the US Coast Guard, and Java Arrow was bordered by a USCG officer who determined that she could be repaired and put back into service. The tanker's starboard anchor chain was cut by a local welder, allowing the tugs Ontario and Bafshe to tow the tanker to Port Everglades while escorted by multiple US Coast Guard vessels. Java Arrow was later taken to Norfolk, Virginia, for permanent repairs—her engine was replaced with one from the British motor tanker Kars. The tanker was renamed Kerry Patch in 1943.

She was acquired by the US Navy in Noumea, New Caledonia, on January 17, 1944, and was renamed Celtic. The tanker was listed as a miscellaneous unclassified ship, given the designation IX-137. She was given one 4"/50-caliber gun, one 3"/50-caliber gun, and eight Oerlikon 20mm guns. Crewed by 114 men, she served as a station tanker in Efate, Espiritu Santo, Port Purvis, Gavutu, Empress Augusta Bay, and Noumea and until March 31, 1945. On that day, she joined a convoy bound for Leyte, arriving on May 25. She served there until July 1, when she sailed for Okinawa, arriving on July 17. She sailed back for Mobile, Alabama, on October 29—she arrived on December 11. She was decommissioned on February 6, 1946.

=== Post-war ===
The tanker was returned to the WSA that same year for disposal, on December 24—Christmas Eve. She was named back to Kerry Patch before being bought by the Radocean Tanker Corporation in April 1948 and renamed Radketch. In June 1949 she was bought by Soc. Armadora Valenciana SA, a subsidiary of Radmar Trading Corporation. She was registered in Panama and her name was changed to Gale. Her name was changed yet again to Sugar in 1955 after ownership was given to Marine Charters Inc. She was finally sold in January 1959 to Cantieri Navali del Golfo, and broken up at La Spezia in March.

A marker commemorating U-333's attack on Java Arrow was dedicated on March 23, 2002, by the Indian River County Historical Society.
