= SS St. Elwyn =

British World War II cargo steamship

History

United Kingdom
- Name: St. Elwyn
- Namesake: Elwen
- Owner: South American Saint Line Ltd
- Operator: B&S Shipping Co, Ltd
- Port of registry: Newport
- Builder: JL Thompson & Sons, Sunderland
- Yard number: 589
- Launched: 17 August 1938
- Completed: October 1938
- Identification: UK official number 162147; call sign GFGY
- Fate: sunk by torpedo, 28 November 1940

General characteristics
- Type: cargo ship
- Tonnage: 4,940 GRT, 2,937 NRT
- Length: 415.1 ft (126.5 m)
- Beam: 58.2 ft (17.7 m)
- Draught: 24 ft 11 3/4 in (7.6 m)
- Depth: 24.8 ft (7.6 m)
- Decks: 1
- Installed power: 320 NHP
- Propulsion: 1 × screw; 1 × compound steam engine via reduction gearing, 1 × steam turbine via double-reduction gearing
- Crew: 40
- Sensors & processing systems: wireless direction finding, echo sounding device
- Notes: sister ships: St. Helena, St. Margaret, St. Clears, St. Rosario

SS St. Elwyn was a cargo steamship that was built in England in 1938 and owned by the South American Saint Line. A German U-boat sank her in the Atlantic Ocean in 1940, with the loss of 24 of her crew.

St. Elwyn was one of a relatively small number of steamships that had a White combination engine, which was a high-speed four-cylinder compound steam engine that drove the propeller shaft via single-reduction gearing, and whose exhaust steam powered a steam turbine that drove the same shaft via double-reduction gearing.

In 1946 the South American Saint Line renamed another steamship St. Elwyn. She had been built in 1940 as Charlton Hall.

== Building ==
In 1936 J.L. Thompson and Sons built a set of three sister ships in Sunderland on the River Wear for South American Saint Line. St. Helena was launched in April 1936 and completed that July. St. Margaret was launched in May 1936 and completed that August. St. Clears was launched in July 1936 and completed that September. Thompson's later built two more sisters to the same design. St. Rosario was launched in September 1937 and completed that December. St. Elwyn was launched on 17 August 1938 and completed that October.

Each of the five ships had almost identical dimensions and engines. St. Elwyn had a registered length of 415.1 ft (126.5 m), beam of 58.2 ft (17.7 m) and depth of 24.8 ft (7.6 m). Her tonnages were 4,940 GRT and 2,937 NRT. Their combination of a high-speed four-cylinder compound steam engine with an exhaust steam turbine, plus reduction gearing from both engines to the propeller shaft, was one that White's had developed and demonstrated in their ship Adderstone since 1934. White's system was as economical as earlier combinations of a reciprocating engine with an exhaust turbine, but with the advantages of being lighter and more compact.

South American Saint Line registered St. Elwyn in Newport. Her UK official number was 162147 and her wireless telegraph call sign was GFGY.

== Second World War service ==
St.Elwyn's movements early in the Second World War seem to have been in and out of the Thames Estuary. She was a member of two convoys that assembled off the coast of Southend-on-Sea in Essex. Convoy FN 9 left Southend on 22 September, steamed north, and reached Methil in Fife two days later. Convoy OA 27 left Southend on 29 October and dispersed at sea on 2 November. St. Elwyn was carrying general cargo and bound for Rio de Janeiro.

In 1940, St. Elwyn's movements were mostly in and out of Liverpool. Her homeward voyages from South America were via Freetown, Sierra Leone, to join an SL convoy to reach home waters. On 24 January 1940 St. Elwyn, carrying grain and general cargo, left Freetown with Convoy SL 18, but she had to drop out of the convoy and return to Freetown. On 1 February she left Freetown again, in Convoy SL 19, which joined the faster Convoy SL 19F on 16 February, and reached Liverpool on 20 February.

On 31 May 1940 St. Elwyn, carrying general cargo, left Freetown with Convoy SL 34, which reached Liverpool on 15 June. By 8 July she was in the Thames Estuary again, leaving Southend with Convoy FN 217, which reached Methil two days later. From Methil she continued with Convoy OA 182, which dispersed at sea on 14 July. Off the Firth of Clyde on 20 July she joined Convoy OB 186, which had left Liverpool that day, and which dispersed at sea two days later.

On 3 October 1940, St. Elwyn, carrying a corgo of wheat, left Freetown with Convoy SL 50. She reached Liverpool with SL 50 on 26 October. On 18 November she left Methil with Convoy EN 28, which reached Oban in Argyll on 22 November. Her cargo was coal.

== Loss ==
On 24 November 1940, St. Elwyn left Liverpool with Convoy OB 249, which dispersed at sea four days later. Her Master was Captain Edward Thomas Alexander Daniells, DSC and Bar, Royal Naval Reserve. Daniells served on minesweepers in the First World War. By December 1915 he was a sub-lieutenant, and he was awarded the DSC for "bravery and devotion to duty". By October 1917 he was a lieutenant, and a bar was added to his DSC for "in recognition of [his] gallantry when one of H.M. minesweepers struck a mine."

On 28 November, Convoy OB 249 dispersed at sea, and St. Elwyn continued independently on a zig-zag course. At 0951 hrs U-103 sighted her, attempted a submerged attack, but was prevented by the ship's zig-zagging. By evening U-103 had caught up with St. Elwyn again. At 2024 hrs one torpedo from U-103 hit St. Elwyn amidships near her bridge. At 2027 hrs the U-boat hit her with a second torpedo, and St. Elwyn sank by her stern at position 55°30′N 19°30′W.

Captain Daniells and 23 of his crew were killed. Also killed were three passengers from Didsbury in Manchester: a mother, grandmother, and two-year-old daughter from the same family. 16 crew members survived. A Reardon Smith Lines steamship, Leeds City, rescued them and landed them at Gourock on the Firth of Clyde.

== Sister ships ==
U-boats sank St. Helena in April 1941 and St. Margaret in February 1943. All of St. Helena's crew survived, but St. Margaret's Chief Engineer and two of his engine room crew were killed.

St. Clears and St. Rosario survived the war. South American Saint Line sold both ships early in the 1950s. In 1951 a German owner bought St. Clears and renamed her Konsul Nimtz. In 1960 she was sold again, renamed Norelg, and registered under the Panamanian flag of convenience. In 1962 she was wrecked in a typhoon and scrapped in Hong Kong. In 1952 a Swedish owner bought St.Rosario and renamed her Katia. In 1958 she was renamed Katia Banck. In 1963 or 1965 a Greek owner bought her and renamed her Ypermachos. She was scrapped in 1969.

== Bibliography ==
- Hardy, AC (1954) [1948]. Modern Marine Engineering. Vol. I (revised ed.). London: Caxton Publishing.
- Lloyd's Register of Shipping (PDF). Vol. II.–Steamers and Motorships of 300 tons gross and over. London: Lloyd's Register of Shipping. 1939 – via Southampton City Council.
