= MV Henry Stanley =

UK cargo ship sunk in 1942

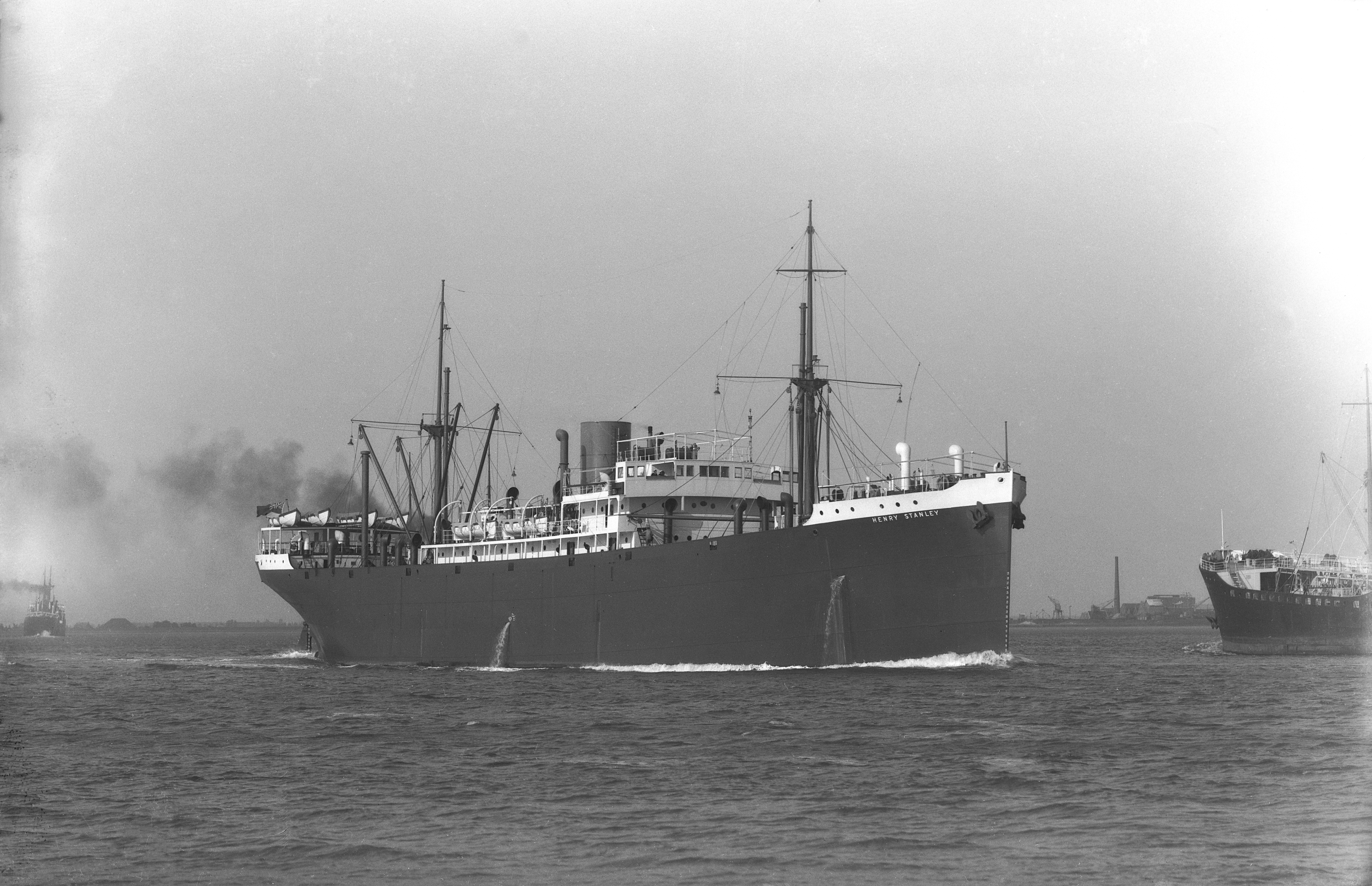
- Henry Stanley, probably in the Scheldt

History

United Kingdom
- Name: Henry Stanley
- Namesake: Henry Morton Stanley
- Owner: 1929: African Steamship Co Ltd; 1935: Elder Dempster Lines Ltd
- Operator: 1929: Elder Dempster & Co Ltd; 1935: Elder Dempster Lines Ltd
- Port of registry: 1929: London; 1935: Liverpool
- Route: Liverpool – West Africa
- Builder: Ardrossan Dockyard Ltd, Ardrossan
- Yard number: 342
- Launched: 21 June 1929
- Completed: August 1929
- Identification: UK official number 161382; until 1933: code letters LFRC; by 1931: call sign GSJV
- Fate: Sunk by torpedo, 6 December 1942

General characteristics
- Class & type: Explorer-class cargo ship
- Tonnage: 4,028 GRT, 2,188 NRT
- Length: 370.5 ft (112.9 m)
- Beam: 51.6 ft (15.7 m)
- Depth: 20.1 ft (6.1 m)
- Decks: 3
- Installed power: 8-cylinder 4-stroke diesel; 650 NHP
- Propulsion: 1 × screw
- Speed: 12.5 knots (23 km/h)
- Capacity: 12 passengers
- Crew: 44, plus 8 DEMS gunners
- Notes: lead ship of eight sister ships

MV Henry Stanley was a UK cargo motor ship that traded between Liverpool and West Africa. She was launched in 1929 in Scotland and sunk in 1942 in the North Atlantic.

Henry Stanley was built for the African Steamship Company Ltd, a subsidiary of Elder, Dempster & Company Ltd. In 1932 the parent company was reorganised as Elder Dempster Lines and in 1935 the African Steamship Co fleet was absorbed into the main Elder Dempster fleet.

== Explorer-class motor ships ==
Henry Stanley was launched on 21 June 1929 and completed that August. She was the lead ship of the "Explorer" class of eight cargo ships built for companies owned by Elder, Dempster & Co. Four were built for the African SS Co and four were built for the British & African Steam Navigation Co Ltd. The Elder Dempster Lines fleet absorbed all eight ships in 1935.

The class was built in four pairs. The Ardrossan Dockyard Ltd built Henry Stanley and Mary Kingsley at Ardrossan in Ayrshire. Archibald McMillan & Son built David Livingstone and Mary Slessor at Dumbarton. D. and W. Henderson and Company built William Wilberforce and Macgregor Laird in Glasgow. Harland and Wolff built Edward Blyden and Alfred Jones in Govan.

Henry Stanley, David Livingstone and Mary Slessor were launched in 1929. Their five sisters were launched in 1930.

Each of the eight ships had a single screw, driven by an eight-cylinder, single-acting, four-stroke diesel engine. John G. Kincaid & Company built Burmeister & Wain-type engines under licence for Henry Stanley and Mary Kingsley. Harland and Wolff built the engines for the other six ships of the class.

== Registration and service ==
Elder, Dempster registered Henry Stanley in Liverpool. Her UK official number was 161382, and her code letters were LFRC. By 1931 her call sign was GSJV, and by 1934 this had superseded her code letters.

Henry Stanley's trade was general cargo to West Africa and West African produce to Liverpool. In the Second World War, Henry Stanley continued to trade between Britain and West Africa, sailing in SL and other convoys when possible, but also unescorted. Her ports of call included Bathurst, Cape Coast, Dakar, Freetown, Santa Cruz de Tenerife and Takoradi.

== Loss ==
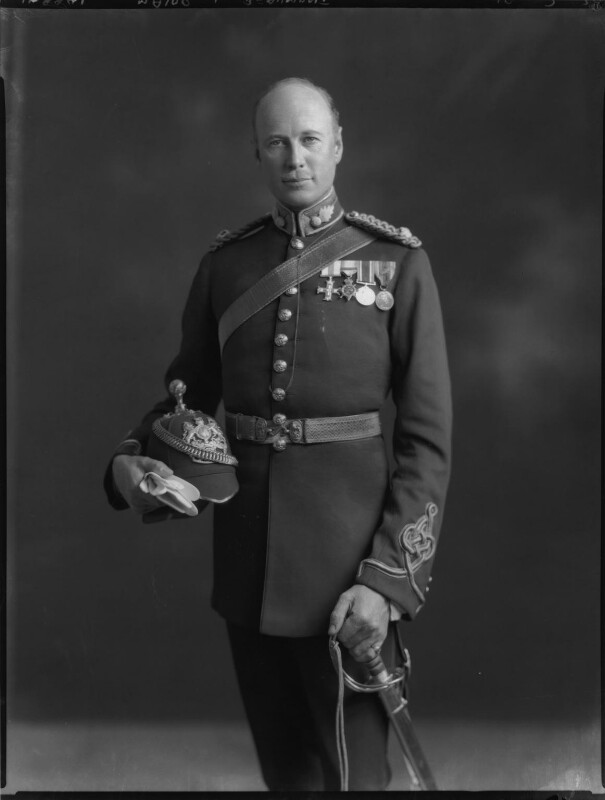
Colonel Lionel Beaumont-Thomas

On 26 or 28 November 1942 Henry Stanley left Liverpool carrying 11 or 12 passengers, including a British Army Colonel and former MP, Lionel Beaumont-Thomas; two Royal Navy officers; and a Blue Funnel Line Captain, Ramsay Brown. Brown had survived the sinking of two of his commands that year: Glenshiel in April, and Deucalion in August when taking part in Operation Pedestal. On 10 November, Brown had been awarded the Distinguished Service Cross for his actions aboard Deucalion, and the King's Commendation for his actions aboard Glenshiel. Henry Stanley carried 4,000 tons of general cargo, plus a small amount of gelignite.

For the first week she sailed with Convoy ON 149, which was bound for New York. On 5 December, when the convoy dispersed, Henry Stanley set course unescorted for Freetown. She maintained a speed of 12 kn (22 km/h; 14 mph) on a zigzag course.

On the night of 6/7 December German submarine U-103 torpedoed Henry Stanley, hitting her starboard side in number one hold, forward of the bridge. Her Master, Henry Jones, immediately gave orders to stop her engine and abandon ship. Her passengers and crew were embarked in her four lifeboats, which were launched and stood off at a safe distance from the ship. U-103 then hit Henry Stanley with a second torpedo, which exploded in number three hold aft of the bridge. The explosion detonated the gelignite in the cargo and Henry Stanley quickly sank about 580 nmi (1,070 km; 670 mi) west or north-west of the Azores.

Sources disagree as to the position where U-103 sank Henry Stanley. A British account gives it as 48°50′N 39°30′W. U-103 recorded it as 40°35′N 39°40′W.

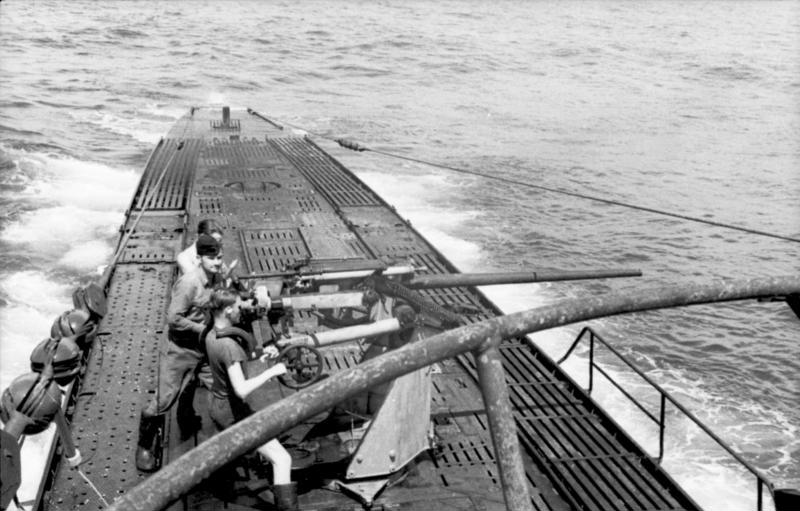
U-103's foredeck and 105 mm gun

About 45 minutes later U-103 surfaced and approached within 30 ft (9 m) of the lifeboats. U-103's commander, 'Oberleutnant zur See Gustav-Adolf Janssen, ordered Captain Jones to come alongside U-103. Jones was commanding lifeboat number two, whose occupants included Captain Brown, Colonel Beaumont-Thomas and the RN lieutenant commander. Jones feared his passengers could be taken prisoner, so he claimed that the swell was too heavy and that the boat could be damaged were he to bring it alongside the u-boat.

Janssen replied "I don't care a damn about your crew". Jones took off his coat and gave it to Captain Brown, putting him in command of the boat. Jones swam to U-103, was taken prisoner and was given a dry set of underwear. Janssen questioned Jones, who claimed Henry Stanley carried only general cargo. having witnessed the explosion in number three hold Janssen did not believe him. Janssen convinced himself the ship had come from Halifax, Nova Scotia and was bound for French North Africa with supplies for Operation Torch.

During the day a gale blew up, so Janssen looked for the lifeboats to see if their occupants needed help. In the heavy sea U-103 shipped water over her stern, which flooded her engine room to a depth of 0.5 metres (20 in). Janssen was forced to submerge to get out of the gale, which continued for three days and nights. U-103 returned to Lorient Submarine Base, where Captain Jones was landed on 29 December as a prisoner of war. He was taken to Germany, interrogated at Wilhelmshaven naval base and held in solitary confinement for 17 days. For the rest of the war he was held prisoner at Marlag und Milag Nord. None of Henry Stanley's four lifeboats or their occupants was seen again. Richard Jones was the sole survivor.

== Bibliography ==
- Cowden, James E (1981). The Price of Peace Elder Dempster 1939–1945. Liverpool: Jocast Ltd. ISBN 0-9507480-0-5.
- Haws, Duncan (1990). Elder Dempster Lines. Merchant Fleets. Vol. 20. Hereford: Travel Creatours Ltd Publications. ISBN 0-946378-17-7.
- Lloyd's Register of Shipping. Vol. II.–Steamers and Motorships of 300 Tons Gross and Over. London: Lloyd's Register of Shipping. 1930 – via Southampton City Council.
- Lloyd's Register of Shipping. Vol. II.–Steamers and Motorships of 300 Tons Gross and Over. London: Lloyd's Register of Shipping. 1934 – via Southampton City Council.
- Mercantile Navy List. London: Registrar General of Shipping and Seamen. 1931 – via Crew List Index Project.
