= MV Seaforth (1938) =

British merchant ship, sunk in 1941

History

United Kingdom
- Name: Seaforth
- Owner: Elder Dempster Lines
- Operator: Elder Dempster Lines
- Port of registry: Liverpool
- Route: Liverpool – West Africa
- Builder: Caledon Shipbuilding & Engineering
- Yard number: 369
- Launched: 22 November 1938
- Completed: February 1939
- Identification: UK official number 166259; call sign GPPZ
- Fate: Sunk by torpedo, 18 February 1941

General characteristics
- Type: Cargo ship
- Tonnage: 5,459 GRT, 3,211 NRT
- Length: 378.0 ft (115.2 m)
- Beam: 52.7 ft (16.1 m)
- Depth: 21.3 ft (6.5 m)
- Decks: 3
- Installed power: 598 NHP, 3,100 bhp
- Propulsion: 4-cylinder 2-stroke diesel
- Speed: 12.5 knots (23 km/h)
- Capacity: 12 passengers
- Crew: 47 plus 2 DEMS gunners
- Notes: sister ships: Sansu, Sangara

MV Seaforth was an Elder Dempster Lines cargo motor ship that traded between Liverpool and West Africa. She was launched in 1938 in Scotland and sunk in 1941 in the North Atlantic.

== Building ==
Caledon Shipbuilding & Engineering Company built Seaforth at its Stannergate yard in Dundee, launching her on 22 November 1938 and completing her in February 1939. William Doxford & Sons of Sunderland made her engine, which was a four-cylinder, single-acting two-stroke diesel rated at 598 NHP or 3,100 bhp.

Seaforth was the first of three sister ships. Sansu and Sangara were launched in 1939 by Scotts Shipbuilding and Engineering Company in Greenock. They differed from Seaforth by having six-cylinder MAN diesel engines that Scotts built under licence.

== Service ==
Seaforth's trade was general cargo to West Africa and West African produce to Liverpool.

The Second World War began less than seven months after she entered service. From October 1939 until November 1940 she sailed in OB convoys outbound from Liverpool to the North Atlantic and SL convoys from Freetown in Sierra Leone to Liverpool. Her ports of call included Douala in Cameroon in October 1939 and Funchal in Madeira in February 1940.

After November 1940 Seaforth sailed unescorted.

== Loss ==
Early in 1941 Seaforth sailed from Liverpool to West Africa. On her return voyage she was carrying nine or ten passengers bound for Liverpool.

The German submarine U-103 sighted Seaforth in a heavy sea at 1355 hrs on 18 February. The u-boat did not attack until after sunset, at 2130 hrs, when she fired a torpedo that missed. Seaforth transmitted a wireless distress message stating that a u-boat was attacking her.

At 2133 hrs U-103 fired a second torpedo, which hit Seaforth amidships. Seaforth's crew launched her lifeboats. At 2150 hrs U-103 fired a third torpedo, which hit Seaforth in the stern. She sank quickly thereafter. No survivors were ever found.

Sources disagree as to the position where U-103 sank Seaforth. Seaforth gave her position as 58°50′N 12°40′W, about 370 nautical miles (690 km) northwest of Ireland. U-103 recorded the position as 58°48′N 18°17′W, about 300 nautical miles (560 km) south of Iceland.

== Bibliography ==
- Cowden, James E (1981). The Price of Peace Elder Dempster 1939–1945. Liverpool: Jocast Ltd. ISBN 0-9507480-0-5.
