= USS Muscatine (ID-2226) =

Cargo ship of the United States Navy

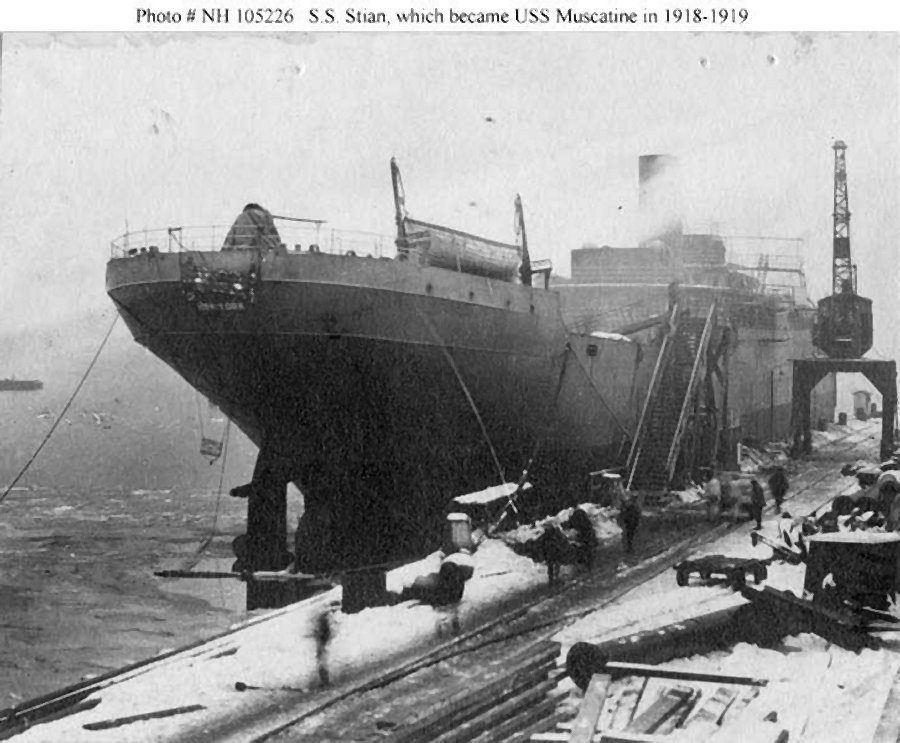
- USS Muscatine (ID-2226)

History

United States
- Name: Muscatine
- Namesake: A city and county in Iowa named for a Native American word meaning "dweller in the prairie"
- Builder: Standard Shipbuilding Corp., Shooters Island, New York
- Laid down: 20 October 1917 as SS Scandinavic
- Acquired: by the U.S. Navy 28 April 1918
- Commissioned: 2 May 1918 as USS Muscatine (ID 2226)
- Decommissioned: 16 July 1919 at New York City
- Renamed: Stian (date unknown); Muscatine (date unknown)
- Stricken: date unknown
- Fate: Sold in 1929
- Notes: Sunk 21 May 1942

General characteristics
- Type: commercial refrigerator ship
- Displacement: 10,502 tons
- Length: 392 ft 6 in (119.63 m)
- Beam: 52 ft (16 m)
- Draft: 23 ft (7.0 m)
- Propulsion: not known
- Speed: 10.5 knots
- Crew: 108 crew members
- Armament: one 5-inch gun and one 3-inch gun

USS Muscatine (ID-2226) was a Norwegian refrigerator ship (reefer ship) obtained by the U.S. Navy from the United States Shipping Board (USSB) during World War I. She served for the duration of the war, carrying "beef and butter" for military personnel in Europe.

She returned to commercial service after the war and later was renamed Floridian and Elizabeth. During World War II, she was struck by torpedoes from a German submarine and sank in the Yucatán Channel.

== Built at Shooters Island ==
Muscatine, a refrigerator ship built in 1917 as Stian by Standard Shipbuilding Corps., Shooters Island, New York, for the Norwegian firm Salveson, Chr. & Co., was commandeered by the United States Shipping Board and transferred to the U.S. Navy on 28 April 1918. She was commissioned on 2 May 1918.

== World War I service ==
After refitting and loading a mixed cargo of U.S. Navy supplies, Muscatine cleared Halifax, Nova Scotia, Canada, in convoy on 30 May 1918 bound for France. Arriving at St. Nazaire on 14 June 1918, she discharged her cargo, proceeded to Verdun-sur-Mer, and departed in convoy for New York on 7 July 1918. In the subsequent months the ship made five more round trip voyages to St. Nazaire with cargoes of beef and butter.

After completing her last run early in July 1919, Muscatine was decommissioned at New York City on 16 July 1919 and returned to the U.S. Shipping Board.

== Subsequent career and fate ==
In 1929, Muscatine was sold to F. D. M. Stracham of Savannah, Georgia, and in 1930 she was renamed Floridian. In 1936, she was renamed Elizabeth.

During World War II, Elizabeth was torpedoed and sunk on 21 May 1942 in the Yucatán Channel by the German submarine German submarine U-103 under the command of Werner Winter. Six of her 42 crew were lost.
