= SS China Arrow =

Steam tanker built in 1920

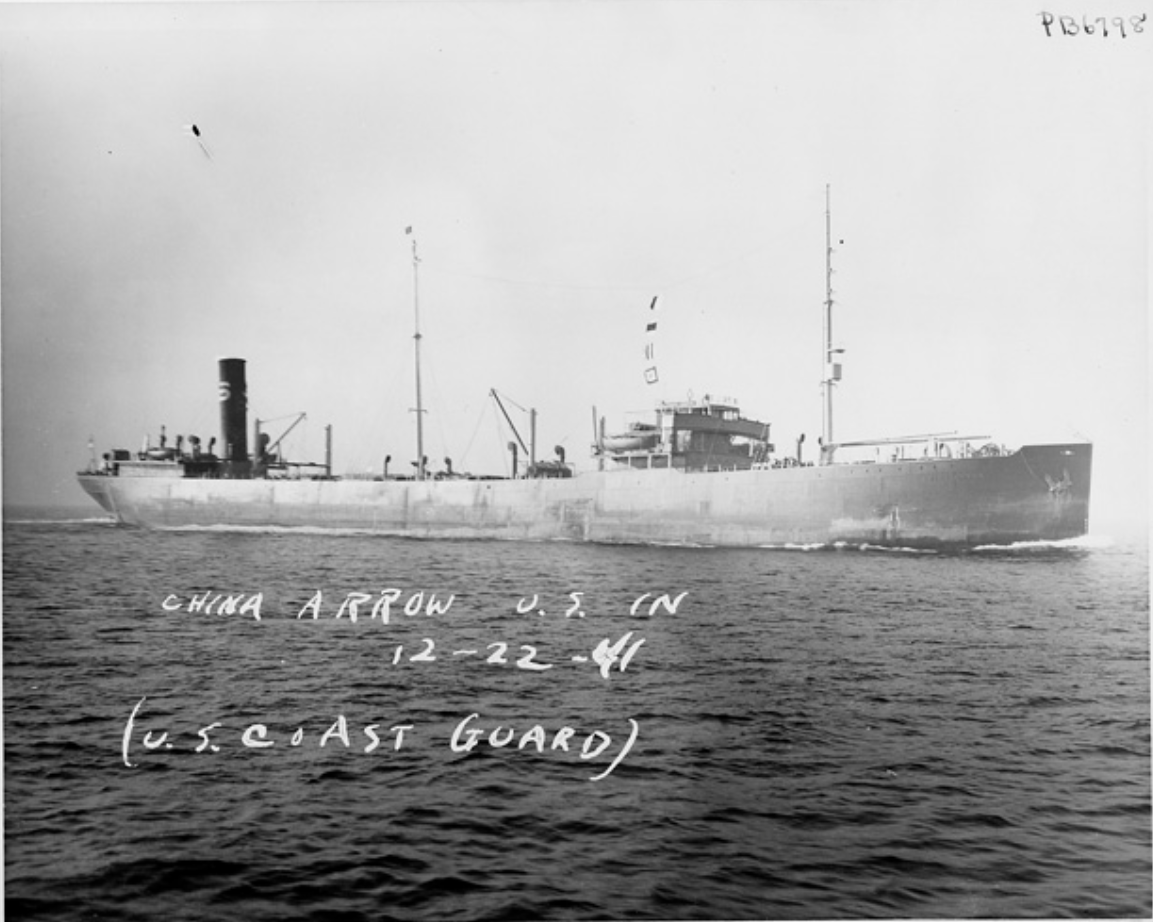
- China Arrow in December 1941, shortly before her sinking.

History

United States
- Name: China Arrow
- Owner: Standard Oil Co. (1918–1930); Socony-Vacuum Oil Co. (1930–1942)
- Operator: Standard Transportation Company (1920–1931); Standard-Vacuum Transportation Company (1931–1935); Socony-Vacuum Oil Co. (1935–1942)
- Builder: Bethlehem Shipbuilding Corp., Quincy
- Yard number: 1385
- Launched: 2 September 1920
- Sponsored by: Miss Fredericka H. Fales
- Completed: 30 September 1920
- Commissioned: 1 October 1920
- Maiden voyage: 12 October 1920
- Home port: New York
- Identification: US Official number 220680; Code letters MBQG (1918–1933); Call sign KDGW (1934–1942)
- Fate: Sunk, 5 February 1942

General characteristics
- Class & type: Arrow-class oil tanker
- Tonnage: 8,403 GRT; 5,228 NRT; 13,950 DWT
- Length: 468.3 ft (142.7 m)
- Beam: 62.7 ft (19.1 m)
- Draft: 27 ft 1 in (8.26 m) (mean)
- Depth: 32.0 ft (9.8 m)
- Installed power: 636 nhp, 3,200 ihp (2,400 kW)
- Propulsion: Bethlehem Shipbuilding Co. 4-cylinder quadruple expansion
- Speed: 11 knots (20 km/h; 13 mph)

SS China Arrow was a steam Arrow-class tanker built in 1920 by Bethlehem Shipbuilding Corporation of Quincy for Standard Oil Co., with intention of transporting oil and petroleum products between United States and the Far East. During the first part of her career the tanker was used to carry oil and gasoline between United States and Asia, later becoming a coastal tanker serving the East Coast of the United States. The ship was torpedoed and sunk in February 1942 on one of her regular trips by German submarine U-103.

== Design and construction ==
Early in 1919, Standard Oil Co. decided to expand its oil carrying business by adding four more tankers of approximately 12,500 deadweight to its existing fleet. A contract for these vessels was awarded to the Bethlehem Shipbuilding Corp. China Arrow was the first of the four ships and was laid down at the Fore River Shipyard in Quincy (yard number 1385) and launched on 2 September 1920, with Miss Fredericka H. Fales, daughter of F.S. Fales, President of Standard Transportation Company, serving as the sponsor. The ship was shelter-deck type, had two main decks and was built on the Isherwood principle of longitudinal framing providing extra strength to the body of the vessel. The ship was equipped with wireless of De Forest type and had electrical lights installed along the decks. The tanker had a cargo pump room located amidships, and had ten double main cargo tanks constructed throughout the vessel with a total capacity to carry 3,665,700 US gallons of oil.

As built, the ship was 468.3 feet (142.7 m) long (between perpendiculars) and 62.7 feet (19.1 m) abeam, and had a depth of 32.0 feet (9.8 m). China Arrow was originally assessed at 8,403 GRT and 5,228 NRT and had deadweight tonnage of approximately 13,950. The vessel had a steel hull, and a single 636 Nhp (3,200 ihp) vertical surface-condensing direct-acting reciprocating quadruple expansion steam engine, with cylinders of 24-inch (61 cm), 35-inch (89 cm), 51-inch (130 cm) and 75-inch (190 cm) diameter with a 51-inch (130 cm) stroke, that drove a single screw propeller and moved the ship at up to 11 knots (13 mph; 20 km/h). The steam for the engine was supplied by three single-ended Scotch marine boilers fitted for oil fuel.

The sea trials were held on 1 October 1920 in the Massachusetts Bay during which the vessel managed to reach maximum speed of 11.25 knots (12.95 mph; 20.84 km/h) and a mean speed of 11.13 knots (12.81 mph; 20.61 km/h) exceeding contract requirements. Following successful completion of full load run, the ship was transferred to her owners and sailed for Philadelphia and from there proceeded on her shakedown trip down to Gulf ports of Texas to load her first cargo destined for the Far East.

== Operational history ==
After delivery to Standard Oil, China Arrow was assigned to Arrow Line and proceeded to Beaumont and Sabine to load her cargo. She departed Port Arthur on October 12 carrying 10,640 tons of oil for Wusong and other Chinese ports. After stopping at San Francisco for fuel in early November, the vessel reached Tianjin on December 4. Upon unloading her cargo the tanker returned to San Francisco in ballast on 6 January 1921 thus successfully concluding her maiden voyage. China Arrow conducted three more trips from California refineries to China before being laid up together with several other vessels in August 1921 due to shortage of cargo. The tanker was reactivated at the end of September 1921 and departed for another trip to China on October 3 carrying 4,000,000 barrels of kerosene. For the next twelve months China Arrow remained in the Far Eastern trade carrying oil and kerosene to Hong Kong, Shanghai as well as ports in Japan. On 3 February 1922 China Arrow was raided in Los Angeles by harbor police and prohibition officials resulting in confiscation of large quantities of contraband whiskey and arrest of the vessel's first officer. In April 1922 the tanker transported 80,000 barrels of oil to Japanese-controlled Vladivostok, this being the first oil cargo to Russia in many years. From October 1922 and for the next nine months the ship was chartered by the United Petroleum Company to carry petroleum products between Beaumont and ports in the Northeast of the United States. After the end of the charter the ship returned to her usual Asian service and largely remained there through July 1927. The tanker served mostly ports in Japan and China, but her travels also took her occasionally to places as far away as Calcutta and Madras. In December 1927 the tanker sailed to Buenos Aires carrying nearly 100,000 barrels of gasoline. During 1928 China Arrow served route from San Pedro in California or Beaumont in Texas to ports of New York, Boston and Philadelphia carrying oil, gasoline and kerosene. After a brief return to Asian service in 1929, the tanker was permanently moved to inter-coastal trade and remained in this capacity through the end of her career.

At about 05:00 on 26 July 1938 in thick fog while leaving Boston on her usual trip to San Pedro China Arrow nearly collided with the fishing trawler Dorchester which was rounding Graves Light just off Nahant. Due to low speed of the vessels there was enough time for both of them to change course and barely scrape each other's sides.

In January 1939 Socony-Vacuum decided to retire China Arrow due to her advanced age and joint with the government plan to build a fleet of new, more modern and speedier vessels. After conducting her last voyage to Beaumont in January 1939 China Arrow proceeded to New York in early February 1939 and was laid up there in anticipation of eventual break up. However, due to mounting shipping losses in the early stages of World War II the company was forced to reconsider and in late February 1940 China Arrow was towed to the dockyard of the Maryland Drydock Company where the old tanker was to be completely rebuilt at a cost of approximately $450,000.

On 9 August 1940 it was reported that the Maritime Commission approved charter of two American tankers by the government of the Soviet Union to deliver oil and motor fuel to the Pacific ports of Vladivostok or Nagaevo after the Soviet government bought over 1,000,000 barrels of high-octane automotive gasoline. China Arrow was one of the selected tankers when she was nearing the end of her rebuilding work. She sailed from Baltimore on August 17 for San Pedro upon completion of all the required work and reached her destination on September 5. After completion of all the necessary procedures and loading, the tanker finally sailed from El Segundo for Vladivostok on October 25 carrying a full load of gasoline. While en route, China Arrow was approved for another trip to Russia and after returning from Vladivostok on December 24, sailed four days later with a similar cargo. During her second trip to the Soviet Union China Arrow collided in Vladivostok harbor with an icebreaker and had to go to the Hunter's Point drydock upon arrival in San Francisco for repairs. Following completion of her third and final trip to the Soviet Union in May 1941, China Arrow proceeded to Aruba and delivered a cargo of fuel oil to Philadelphia in June of the same year. After one more trip from the Caribbean to Philadelphia, the tanker was reassigned back to her original route between Beaumont, Corpus Christi and other Gulf ports and New York and Philadelphia where she remained for the rest of her career.

=== Sinking ===
China Arrow departed for her last voyage from Beaumont at the end of January 1942 carrying 81,773 barrels of fuel oil bound for New York. The tanker was under command of captain Paul Hoffman Browne and had a crew of eight officers and twenty nine men. In the morning of February 5 the tanker was off Winter Quarter Shoals, approximately 90 nautical miles (170 km) from the shore and running a zigzag course. At approximately 11:15 local time the ship was suddenly struck on her starboard side in quick succession by two torpedoes fired by German submarine U-103 around #8, #9 and #10 holds. The resulting explosion blew the oil over 100 feet up onto the air and immediately ignited fire in the holds. The steam firefighting system was employed and managed to extinguish the fire in #9 and #10 holds, but failed to do so in hold #8. Seeing that the fire cannot be brought under control, captain Browne ordered the crew to abandon ship. Three lifeboats were lowered and everyone on board with the exception of the captain and radio operator Kenneth W. Maynard left the vessel at approximately 11:40. As the antenna was shot off after the first torpedo impact it was impossible to send the S.O.S signal, but the radioman managed to create an improvised one and send out the distress signal. U-103 surfaced soon after about 500 feet away and the last two remaining crew members on board China Arrow had to hastily leave the ship. The submarine then proceeded to fire between 15 and 20 shots from the deck gun into the damaged vessel causing China Arrow to go down stern first heavily listing on her starboard side at 12:30 in an approximate position 37°44′N 73°18′W. While the lifeboats were well provisioned and had blankets, most men left the vessel in such a haste that many of them had only their pajamas or underwear on. At approximately 15:45 US Army B-25A patrol plane spotted three lifeboats with survivors, and relayed the message to the Inshore Patrol. They also spotted what they claimed to be a diving submarine and proceeded to drop four 500-lbs bombs from approximately 1,000 feet with unknown results. At 16:20 patrol boat PE-56 and the Coast Guard cutter Nike were dispatched to the reported location. The lifeboats managed to stay close together for the next two days while rowing towards the shore, and none of the crew suffered any serious adverse effects. In the afternoon of February 7 Norfolk-based aircraft sighted the lifeboats again and continued circling them until Nike arrived at the scene and picked up all survivors by 19:45. They were then taken to the US Coast Guard station at Lewes where they were all safely landed in the early morning of February 8.

For his heroism and distinguished service under unusual hazards, Captain Browne was awarded the Merchant Marine Distinguished Service Medal by the President of the United States. For the President the award was given by Admiral Emory S. Land.
