= German submarine U-103 (1940) =

German World War II submarine

Coordinates: 54.326°N 10.164°E

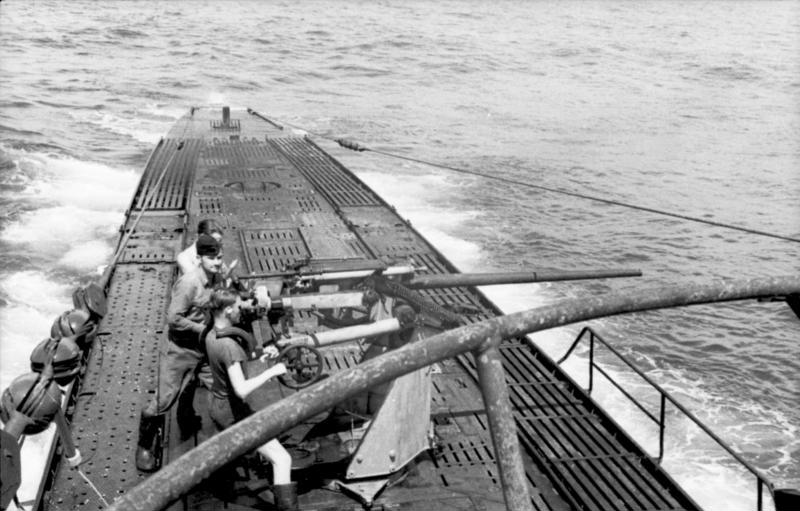
- U-103 in 1939. Looking backwards from the conning tower. Note the width of casing of the Type IX compared to the Type VII U-boat

History

Nazi Germany
- Name: U-103
- Ordered: 24 May 1938
- Builder: AG Weser, Bremen
- Yard number: 966
- Laid down: 6 September 1939
- Launched: 12 April 1940
- Commissioned: 5 July 1940
- Fate: Scuttled on 3 May 1945 at Kiel

General characteristics
- Class & type: Type IXB submarine
- Displacement: 1,051 t (1,034 long tons) surfaced; 1,178 t (1,159 long tons) submerged
- Length: 76.50 m (251 ft) o/a; 58.75 m (192 ft 9 in) pressure hull
- Beam: 6.76 m (22 ft 2 in) o/a; 4.40 m (14 ft 5 in) pressure hull
- Height: 9.60 m (31 ft 6 in)
- Draught: 4.70 m (15 ft 5 in)
- Installed power: 4,400 PS (3,200 kW; 4,300 bhp) (diesels); 1,000 PS (740 kW; 990 shp) (electric)
- Propulsion: 2 shafts; 2 × diesel engines; 2 × electric motors
- Speed: 18.2 knots (33.7 km/h; 20.9 mph) surfaced; 7.3 knots (13.5 km/h; 8.4 mph) submerged
- Range: 12,000 nmi (22,000 km; 14,000 mi) at 10 knots (19 km/h; 12 mph) surfaced; 64 nmi (119 km; 74 mi) at 4 knots (7.4 km/h; 4.6 mph) submerged
- Test depth: 230 m (750 ft)
- Complement: 4 officers, 44 enlisted
- Armament: 6 × torpedo tubes (4 bow, 2 stern); 22 × 53.3 cm (21 in) torpedoes; 1 × 10.5 cm (4.1 in) SK C/32 deck gun (180 rounds); 1 × 3.7 cm (1.5 in) SK C/30 AA gun; 1 × twin 2 cm FlaK 30 AA guns

Service record
- Part of: 2nd U-boat Flotilla; 5 July 1940 – 1 January 1944; 24th U-boat Flotilla; 1 January – 1 March 1944
- Identification codes: M 04 095
- Commanders: K.Kapt. Viktor Schütze; 5 July 1940 – 12 August 1941; Kptlt. Werner Winter; 13 August 1941 – 14 July 1942; Kptlt. Gustav-Adolf Janssen; 15 July 1942 – 13 March 1944; Oblt.z.S. Heinz Murl; 23 January – 18 February 1945; Oblt.z.S. Hans-Norbert Schunck; 31 March – 15 April 1945
- Operations: 11 patrols: 1st patrol: 21 September – 19 October 1940; 2nd patrol: 9 November – 12 December 1940; 3rd patrol: 21 January – 24 February 1941; 4th patrol: 1 April – 12 July 1941; 5th patrol: 10 September – 9 November 1941; 6th patrol: 3 January – 1 March 1942; 7th patrol: 15 April – 22 June 1942; 8th patrol: 21 October – 29 December 1942; 9th patrol: 7 February – 26 March 1943; 10th patrol: a. 24 April – 26 May 1943; b. 25 – 26 July 1943; 11th patrol: a. 18 – 19 September 1943; b. 23 September 1943 – 1 January 1944; c. 3 – 7 January 1944
- Victories: 46 merchant ships sunk (238,944 GRT); 3 merchant ships damaged (28,158 GRT)

German submarine U-103 was a Type IXB U-boat of Nazi Germany's Kriegsmarine that operated during World War II. She was one of the most successful boats in the entire war, sinking 238,944 gross register tons (GRT) of Allied shipping in 11 patrols, in a career lasting more than four years.

U-103 was laid down on 6 September 1939 at DeSchiMAG AG Weser in Bremen as yard number 966. She was launched on 12 April 1940 and commissioned on 5 July under the command of Korvettenkapitän Victor Schütze. After her warm-up, (designed to give her an opportunity to train and repair minor faults), she was deployed into the North Atlantic in September 1940 and saw overwhelming success, sinking 46 ships and damaging three other vessels.

== Design ==
Type IXB submarines were slightly larger than the original Type IX submarines, later designated IXA. U-103 had a displacement of 1,051 tonnes (1,034 long tons) when at the surface and 1,178 tonnes (1,159 long tons) while submerged. The U-boat had a total length of 76.50 m (251 ft), a pressure hull length of 58.75 m (192 ft 9 in), a beam of 6.76 m (22 ft 2 in), a height of 9.60 m (31 ft 6 in), and a draught of 4.70 m (15 ft 5 in). The submarine was powered by two MAN M 9 V 40/46 supercharged four-stroke, nine-cylinder diesel engines producing a total of 4,400 metric horsepower (3,240 kW; 4,340 shp) for use while surfaced, two Siemens-Schuckert 2 GU 345/34 double-acting electric motors producing a total of 1,000 metric horsepower (740 kW; 990 shp) for use while submerged. She had two shafts and two 1.92 m (6 ft) propellers. The boat was capable of operating at depths of up to 230 metres (750 ft).

The submarine had a maximum surface speed of 18.2 knots (33.7 km/h; 20.9 mph) and a maximum submerged speed of 7.3 knots (13.5 km/h; 8.4 mph). When submerged, the boat could operate for 64 nautical miles (119 km; 74 mi) at 4 knots (7.4 km/h; 4.6 mph); when surfaced, she could travel 12,000 nautical miles (22,000 km; 14,000 mi) at 10 knots (19 km/h; 12 mph). U-103 was fitted with six 53.3 cm (21 in) torpedo tubes (four fitted at the bow and two at the stern), 22 torpedoes, one 10.5 cm (4.13 in) SK C/32 naval gun, 180 rounds, and a 3.7 cm (1.5 in) SK C/30 as well as a 2 cm (0.79 in) C/30 anti-aircraft gun. The boat had a complement of forty-eight.

== Service history ==
=== First patrol ===
The boat entered the Atlantic via the gap between the Faroe and Shetland Islands. Her first victory was sinking Nina Borthen in mid-ocean on 6 October. After being hit by a torpedo, the ship developed a list, which the crew corrected. Two more torpedoes hit the ship, which also caused a list. Another torpedo hit broke the vessel in two and she sank with all hands.

On 9 October, U-103 sank Zanes Gounaris and damaged Graigwen and Delphin. Delphin sank the next day. She sank Nora on 13 October and Thistlegarth, 45 nmi (83 km; 52 mi) west northwest of Rockall, on 15 October.

U-103 docked at her new base, Lorient on the French Atlantic coast, on 19 October.

=== Second patrol ===
U-103's second patrol began with her being unsuccessfully attacked by the Flower-class corvette HMS Rhododendron northwest of Ireland on 11 November 1940.

She then sank Daydawn and Victoria on 21 November, Glenmoor on the 27th, and Mount Athos and St. Elwyn on the 28th. The attacks continued with Calabria on 8 December and Empire Jaguar the next day.

The submarine returned to Lorient on 12 December.

=== Third patrol ===
On 13 February 1941 Arthur F. Corwin was damaged by U-103, and sunk by U-96 later that day. On 19 February U-103 sank the Norwegian motor ship Benjamin Franklin. The Flower-class corvette HMS Pimpernel rescued seven survivors, and landed them at Liverpool. The Egyptian steamship Memphis rescued 29 of her crew, but on 28 February Memphis suffered engine failure and sank with all hands.

=== Fourth patrol ===
U-103's fourth patrol was off the coast of West Africa. At 103 days, it was her longest patrol. She sank Polyana 41 nmi (76 km; 47 mi) southwest of the Cape Verde Islands on 24 April 1941. The ship sank with all hands in one minute.

U-103 sank Samsø, Wray Castle, Surat and Dunkwa in the first week of May. When Dunkwa sank, U-103's crew saw that there were 39 survivors in one lifeboat. The U-boat crew righted another boat and provided drinking water.

On 25 May, she sank the cargo ship Radames off the coast of Liberia. The sinking of the Radames was filmed, and is often shown on documentaries about the Battle of the Atlantic.

U-103 sank another seven ships off the African coast before returning to Lorient on 12 July.

=== Fifth patrol ===
U-103's fifth patrol was in the North Atlantic. It sank Niceto de Larrinaga, Edward Blyden and Lapwing west of the Canary Islands on 22 September 1941.

=== Sixth patrol ===
The U-boat's sixth patrol was part of Operation Drumbeat, off the Atlantic coast of the USA. She sank W. L. Stead about 90 nmi (170 km; 100 mi) off the Delaware River on 2 February 1942. The torpedo hit set the ship on fire but wave action soon extinguished it. Using her deck gun, U-103 fired 83 rounds, scoring 17 hits and reigniting the fire. She fired a further two torpedoes. The second missed, but the third detonated the tanker's cargo, sending flames 500 ft (150 m) into the air.

U-103 also sank San Gil on 4 February, and both India Arrow and China Arrow the next day.

=== Seventh patrol ===
U-103 began her seventh patrol by leaving Lorient on 15 April 1942. She sank Stanbank northeast of Bermuda on 5 May. She continued to the Caribbean and the Gulf of Mexico, where she sank another eight merchant ships that month. U-103 returned to Lorient on 22 June.

=== Eighth patrol ===
U-103 sank Tasmania north of Madeira on 31 October 1942, and Henry Stanley in mid-Atlantic northwest of the Azores on 6 December. She captured Henry Stanley's Master. He was eventually sent to the Milag Nord internment camp for merchant seamen.

U-103 also damaged Horata north of the Azores on 13 December.

=== Ninth and tenth patrols ===
On her ninth patrol U-103 sank no ships. She searched the Atlantic off Spain as far west as the Azores and as far south as Morocco, but found no convoys. Having left Lorient on 7 February 1943, she returned there on 26 March.

On U-103'S tenth patrol, on 27 April a Vickers Wellington of No. 172 Squadron RAF equipped with a Leigh Light attacked her. The aircraft found the U-boat with its radar, and dropped six depth charges, but caused no damage. A Whitley bomber of No. 10 OTU (Operational Training Unit) attacked U-103 on 22 May. U-103 returned fire, preventing the aircraft from dropping its depth charges. Plane and submarine both returned safely to their bases.

=== 11th patrol ===
U-103's last operational patrol was officially divided into two parts; the first of which saw her arrive in Brest in France only two days after her departure from Lorient. She then returned to the west African coast but without repeating her earlier success. She sailed to Norway via a reverse in the course of her first patrol and arrived at Bergen on 1 January 1944.

== Fate ==
U-103 left Bergen on 3 January 1944 and reached Kiel on the 7th. In March she was taken out of service and used as a Schulboot (training boat). She went from Gotenhafen to Hamburg in January 1945, and in April from Hamburg back to Kiel. On 3 May 1945 she was scuttled at Kiel.

=== Wolfpacks ===
U-103 took part in nine wolfpacks, namely:

- Störtebecker (5 – 7 November 1941)
- Streitaxt (29 October – 2 November 1942)
- Schlagetot (9 – 21 November 1942)
- Westwall (21 November – 16 December 1942)
- Robbe (16 February – 12 March 1943)
- Wohlgemut (12 – 19 March 1943)
- Amsel 4 (4 – 6 May 1943)
- Rhein (7 – 10 May 1943)
- Elbe 2 (10 – 14 May 1943)

== Summary of raiding history ==
Date	Ship	Nationality	Tonnage (Note: Merchant ship tonnages are in gross register tons. Military vessels are listed by tons displacement.)	Fate
6 October 1940	Nina Borthen	Norway	6,123	Sunk
9 October 1940	Delphin	Greece	3,816	Sunk
9 October 1940	Graigwen	United Kingdom	3,697	Damaged
9 October 1940	Zannes Gounaris	Greece	4,407	Sunk
13 October 1940	Nora	Estonia	1,186	Sunk
15 October 1940	Thislegarth	United Kingdom	4,747	Sunk
21 November 1940	Daydawn	United Kingdom	4,768	Sunk
21 November 1940	Victoria	Greece	6,085	Sunk
27 November 1940	Glenmoor	United Kingdom	4,393	Sunk
28 November 1940	Mount Athos	Greece	3,578	Sunk
28 November 1940	St. Elwyn	United Kingdom	4,940	Sunk
8 December 1940	Calabria	United Kingdom	9,515	Sunk
9 December 1940	Empire Jaguar	United Kingdom	5,186	Sunk
13 February 1941	Arthur F. Corwin	United Kingdom	10,516	Damaged
17 February 1941	Edwy R. Brown	United Kingdom	10,455	Sunk
18 February 1941	Seaforth	United Kingdom	5,459	Sunk
19 February 1941	Benjamin Franklin	Norway	7,034	Sunk
25 April 1941	Polyana	Norway	2,267	Sunk
1 May 1941	Samsø	United Kingdom	1,494	Sunk
3 May 1941	Wray Castle	United Kingdom	4,253	Sunk
6 May 1941	Dunkwa	United Kingdom	4,752	Sunk
6 May 1941	Surat	United Kingdom	5,529	Sunk
9 May 1941	City of Winchester	United Kingdom	7,120	Sunk
11 May 1941	City of Shanghai	United Kingdom	5,828	Sunk
22 May 1941	British Grenadier	United Kingdom	6,857	Sunk
24 May 1941	Marionga	Greece	4,236	Sunk
25 May 1941	Radames	Egypt	3,575	Sunk
25 May 1941	Wangi Wangi	Netherlands	7,789	Sunk
8 June 1941	Elmdene	United Kingdom	4,853	Sunk
29 June 1941	Erani	Italy	6,619	Sunk
22 September 1941	Edward Blyden	United Kingdom	5,003	Sunk
22 September 1941	Niceto de Larringa	United Kingdom	5,591	Sunk
26 September 1941	Lapwing	United Kingdom	1,348	Sunk
2 February 1942	W. L. Steed	United States	6,182	Sunk
4 February 1942	India Arrow	United States	8,327	Sunk
4 February 1942	San Gil	United States	3,627	Sunk
5 February 1942	China Arrow	United States	8,403	Sunk
5 February 1942	Stanbank	United States	5,966	Sunk
17 May 1942	Ruth Lykes	United States	2,612	Sunk
19 May 1942	Ogontz	United States	5,037	Sunk
21 May 1942	Clare	United States	3,372	Sunk
21 May 1942	Elizabeth	United States	4,727	Sunk
23 May 1942	Samuel Q. Brown	United States	6,625	Sunk
24 May 1942	Hector	Netherlands	1,828	Sunk
26 May 1942	Alcoa Carrier	United States	5,588	Sunk
28 May 1942	New Jersey	United States	6,414	Sunk
31 October 1942	Tasmania	United Kingdom	6,405	Sunk
6 December 1942	Henry Stanley	United Kingdom	5,025	Sunk
13 December 1942	Horata	United Kingdom	13,945	Damaged

== See also ==
- List of successful U-boats

== Bibliography ==
- Busch, Rainer; Röll, Hans-Joachim (1999). German U-boat commanders of World War II : a biographical dictionary. Translated by Brooks, Geoffrey. London, Annapolis, Md: Greenhill Books, Naval Institute Press. ISBN 1-55750-186-6.
- Busch, Rainer; Röll, Hans-Joachim (1999). Deutsche U-Boot-Verluste von September 1939 bis Mai 1945 [German U-boat losses from September 1939 to May 1945]. Der U-Boot-Krieg (in German). Vol. IV. Hamburg, Berlin, Bonn: Mittler. ISBN 3-8132-0514-2.
- Edwards, Bernard (1996). Dönitz and the Wolfpacks – The U-boats at War. Cassell Military Classics. pp. 119, 125. ISBN 0-304-35203-9.
- Gröner, Erich; Jung, Dieter; Maass, Martin (1991). German Warships 1815–1945, U-boats and Mine Warfare Vessels. Vol. 2. Translated by Thomas, Keith; Magowan, Rachel. London: Conway Maritime Press. ISBN 0-85177-593-4.
