= Arrow-class oil tanker =

Class of American steam oil tankers (1916–1959)

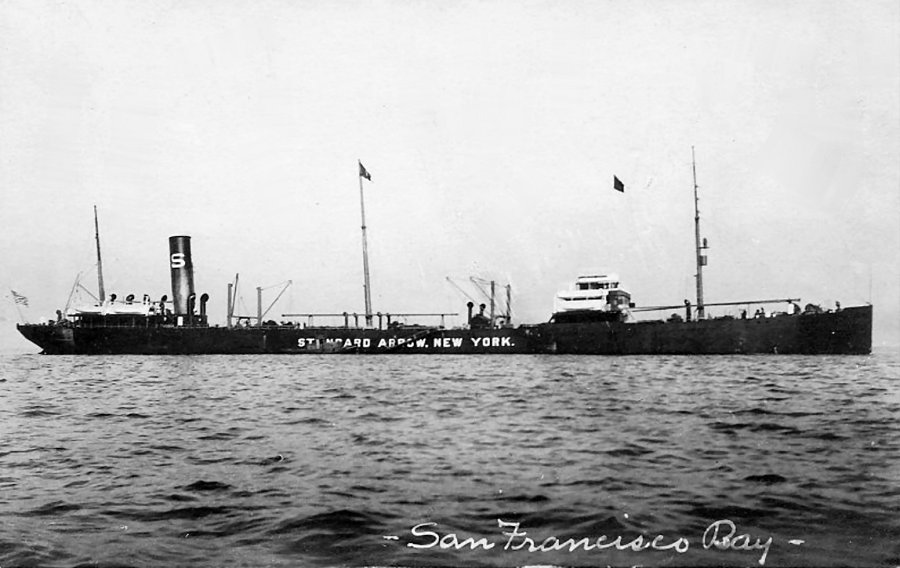
- SS Standard Arrow, the first member of the Arrow class, sometime before her World War I service

Class overview
- Name: Arrow class
- Builders: New York Shipbuilding Corporation; Bethlehem Shipbuilding Corporation
- Operators: Standard Oil Company of New York; Standard Transportation Company; Socony-Vacuum Oil Company; United States Navy; United States Coast Guard; Naval Overseas Transportation Service; War Shipping Administration; Cantieri Navali del Golfo; Corrada Societa Di Navigazione; Brilliant Transportation Company; Radocean Tanker Corporation; Soc. Armadora Valenciana; Commander Trading Corporation; Marine Charters Incorporated
- Preceded by: Barques and clippers
- Succeeded by: T2
- Built: 1916–1921
- In service: 1916–1959
- Planned: 14
- Completed: 12
- Canceled: 2
- Lost: 6
- Scrapped: 6

General characteristics
- Type: Steam-powered oil tanker
- Tonnage: Between 7,749 and 8,403 tons
- Length: Between 467.6–468.3 ft (142.5–142.7 m)
- Beam: 62.7 ft (19.1 m)
- Draft: 26.0 ft (7.9 m)
- Depth: 72–89 ft (22–27 m)
- Propulsion: One triple-screw propeller
- Speed: 11 knots (20 km/h; 13 mph)
- Capacity: Between 82,148–99,742 bbl (13,060.5–15,857.7 m^{3})

The Arrow class consisted of twelve steam-powered oil tankers constructed for the Standard Oil Company of New York (Socony) between 1916 and 1921. They were operated by various subsidiaries of Socony, various other companies, and the US government. They had a total of 43 years in service between 1917 and 1959. The tankers carried petroleum and other oil products in various capacities throughout their lifespans. While the tankers were all designed for service in East Asia, many would sail to places like the Middle East or the Gulf Coast prior to the United States' entry into World War II. Five ships of the class would be sunk by German U-boats during the war, and the remainder were scrapped by the end of 1959.

== Construction ==
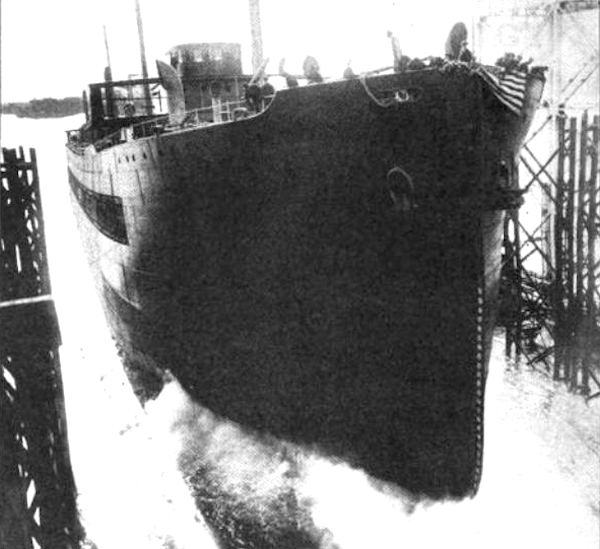
The launching of Empire Arrow on May 24, 1921

Following the outbreak of World War I, Socony began designing a new class of oil tanker designed to replace an aging class of barks and clippers that had been made for the company at the turn of the century. Named the Arrow class, the tankers were designed by naval architect and head of Socony's Marine Transportation Department, Nicholas J. Pluymert. The tankers were designed for the foreign petroleum trade between California and East Asia, with a handful of ships occasionally conducting circumnavigations.

A total of twelve tankers were constructed. The first four tankers were built by the New York Shipbuilding Corporation in Camden, New Jersey. In 1920, the United States Shipping Board authorized Standard Transportation Company to finance the construction of ten more Arrow-class oil tankers under the provisions of the Merchant Marine Act of 1920. The construction of four tankers was contracted to the Bethlehem Steel Company in Quincy, Massachusetts, and four more were contracted to the New York Shipbuilding Corporation.

There were minimal differences between the tankers, as designing one ship would serve as a standard for the others in her class, saving on production costs, construction time, materials, and crew training. The largest difference was in the gross register tonnages of each of the tankers, which varied even between different ships built at the same yard.

== Design and specifications ==
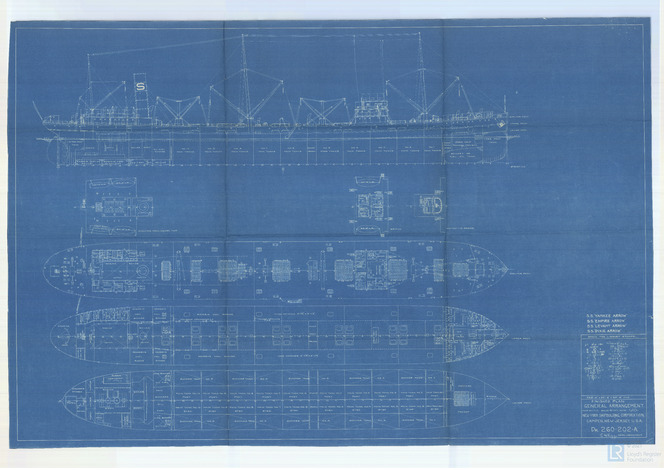
Blueprints for the last four Arrow-class oil tankers built

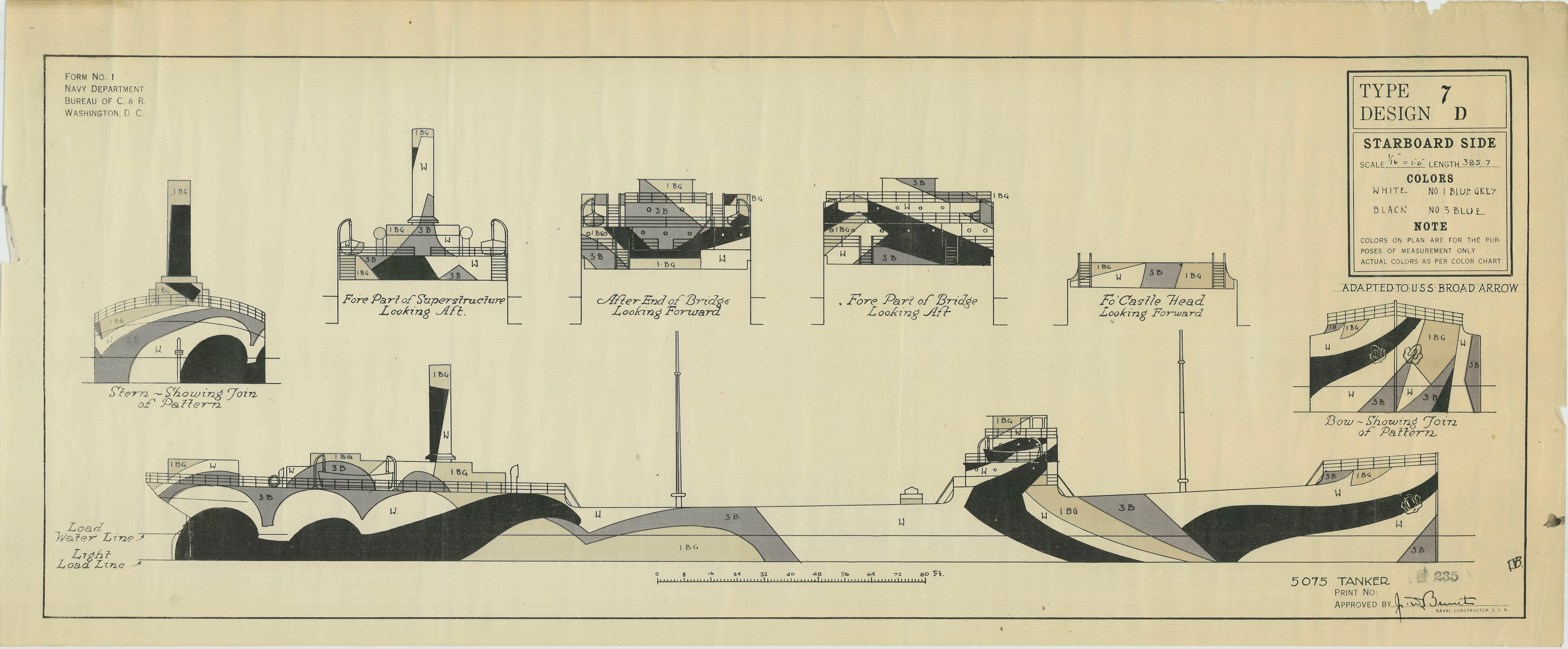
A drawing of Broad Arrow painted in naval camouflage for her World War I service

The first four ships built by New York Shipbuilding—Standard Arrow, Royal Arrow, Sylvan Arrow, and Broad Arrow—all measured 467.6 feet (142.5 m) long and 62.7 feet (19.1 m) wide. While both Standard Arrow and Royal Arrow had a gross register tonnage of 7,794, Broad Arrow added three tons, and Sylvan Arrow added four. The cargo capacity for each of these tankers was initially 99,742 barrels (15,857.7 m^{3}), but Royal Arrow's would be decreased to 82,148 bbl (13,060.5 m^{3}) after being commandeered by the US government in World War I.

In 1919, Socony decided to construct four more Arrow-class oil tankers. This batch of ships—China Arrow, Japan Arrow, Java Arrow, and India Arrow—were constructed by Bethlehem Steel Company in Quincy. All of them were 468.3 feet (142.7 m) long and 62.7 feet wide. China Arrow had a gross register tonnage of 8,403, while the other three had a smaller gross register tonnage of only 8,327.

The final four ships to be constructed were ordered in late 1919, and all of them were built by New York Shipbuilding: Yankee Arrow, Empire Arrow, Levant Arrow, and Dixie Arrow. Each of these ships measured 468.3 feet long and 62.7 feet wide. Each of these ships had a tonnage of 8,046 and a cargo capacity of 99,742 barrels.

Broadly speaking, the Arrow class boasted three masts, the third of which was shorter than the other two. On the tankers' funnels was white "S". The funnel sat atop the aft superstructure, which was a shelter "designed to carry petroleum in bulk with aft positioned machinery." The oil tankers had ten double cargo holds for bulk oil able to carry roughly 4,000,000 US gallons (15,000,000 L) gallons of commercial oil, and had room for a maximum of 400,000 US gallons (1,500,000 L) of fuel that would allow them to steam a maximum length of 46 days.

A tween deck, designed to carry general cargo, was located between the hold and the main deck, and the space was used significantly during service in East Asia. Located on the main deck were five deck cranes, used to transport cargo in and out of the holds. For this purpose, there were eight removable hatches on the main deck. Each of the oil tankers carried either four wooden lifeboats—with two on the forward superstructure and two on the aft superstructure—or six wooden lifeboats—with two on the forward superstructure and four on the aft superstructure—as well as multiple wooden life rafts.

== Service overview ==
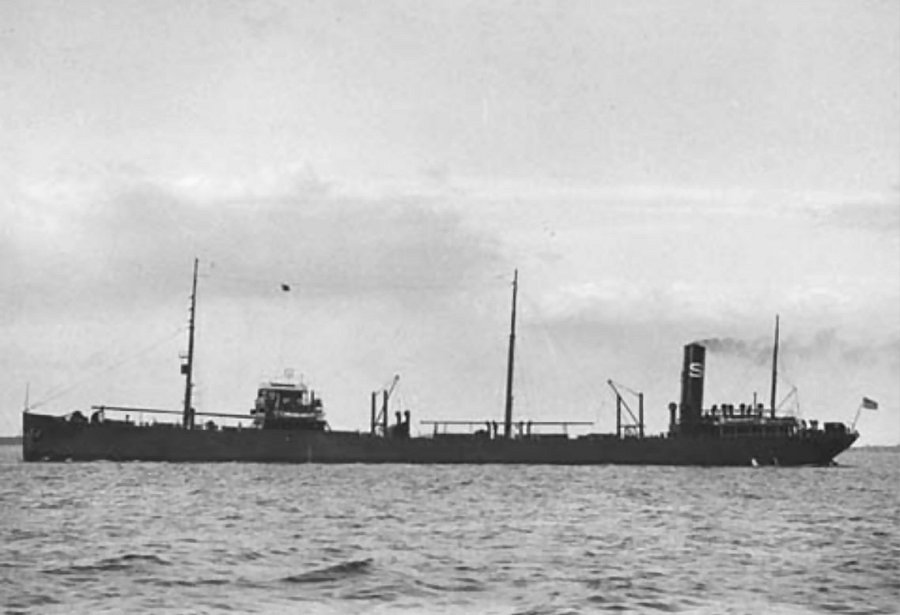
Dixie Arrow in the late 1920s

The Arrow-class oil tankers were designed for service in East Asia, specifically the petroleum trade between there and California. The majority of the class, however, would not operate in this capacity until the early 1920s. During World War I, the tankers of the class that were finished in the 1917–1918 timeframe were acquired by the United States federal government and pressed into service with the US Navy. Standard Arrow, the first ship of the class to be completed, served in civilian capacity for under a year after she was completed in 1916, being commissioned by the US Navy in 1917.

The oil tankers largely set sail from the East Coast and sailed through the Panama Canal on their way to California. They docked in ports located in China, the Philippines, and the Dutch East Indies. Following the 1929 onset of the Great Depression, the Arrow class was limited to only serve in North America. The amount of oil tankers steaming to and from California and through the Panama Canal had lessened since 1927, and the fields in the state would eventually become obsolete in the early 1930s. Arrow-class oil tankers were subsequently limited to the East and Gulf coasts. Two of them—Empire Arrow and Levant Arrow—were scrapped before the onset of World War II.

During World War II, a majority of the members of the Arrow class were pressed into service by the United States Merchant Marine. Seven of the tankers—Broad Arrow, China Arrow, Dixie Arrow, India Arrow, Java Arrow, Sylvan Arrow, and Yankee Arrow—were torpedoed by German U-boats. Java Arrow and Yankee Arrow were both saved and operated in other capacities for the remainder of the war. The United States federal government also acquired several members of the class for service in the US Navy, namely Japan Arrow and Standard Arrow.

The tankers that survived the war were sold to other companies in the latter half of the 1940s and scrapped. The last operating member, Royal Arrow, was scrapped in Italy in 1959. Throughout its lifespan the Arrow class was "wildly admired" and praised, with some considering the tankers "to have reached the height of the reciprocating-engine ship in efficiency and all-round tanker performance."

== Ships ==
=== Broad Arrow ===
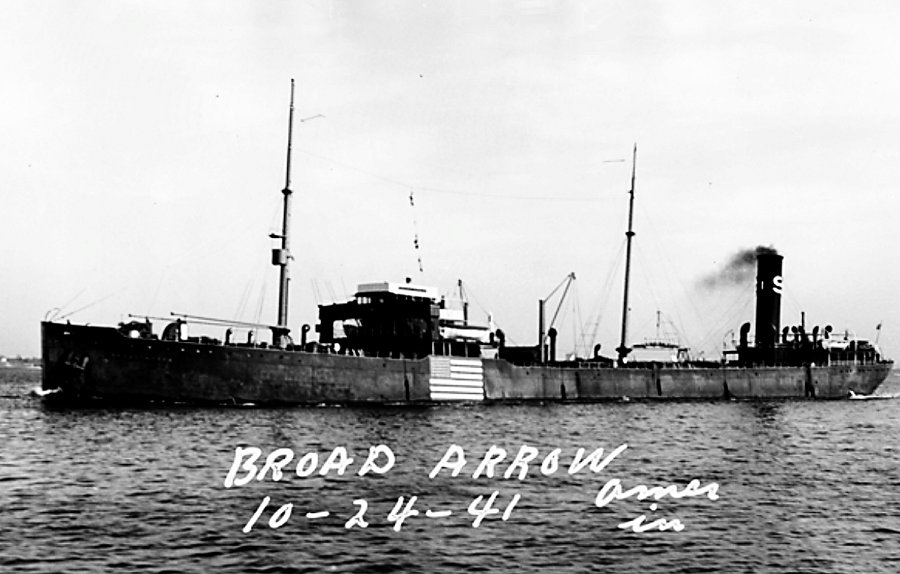
SS Broad Arrow with an American flag hanging off her port side, on October 24, 1941

Work on SS Broad Arrow began when her keel was laid by the New York Shipbuilding Corporation on April 26, 1917. She was launched on December 22 of that year. The tanker was acquired by the US Navy and given to the Naval Overseas Transportation Service on March 12, 1918 and her prefix changed to USS. Broad Arrow carried fuel between the United States and France for the next eleven months, being returned to her owners on February 24, 1919.

The tanker departed Port of Spain, the capital of the British territory of Trinidad and Tobago, on January 5, 1943. She was bound for Rio de Janeiro, the second-largest city in Brazil. Close to midnight on January 8, the tanker was torpedoed by the German submarine U-124. The first torpedo struck the aft magazine and created a massive explosion, causing the tanker to flood rapidly and settle by the stern.

The second torpedo lit the cargo hold aflame, and the fire soon spread to the tanker and the rest of the convoy that Broad Arrow was traveling in. All crew in the engine room and on the bridge were killed by the explosions. The remainder of the crew abandoned ship roughly five minutes after the explosions, without orders, leaving others who were still aboard or in the water. The crew in the lifeboats were picked up by USS PC-577 and taken to Paramaribo, capital of Surinam, the next day. Two survivors then died aboard PC-577 and were buried in the city.

=== China Arrow ===
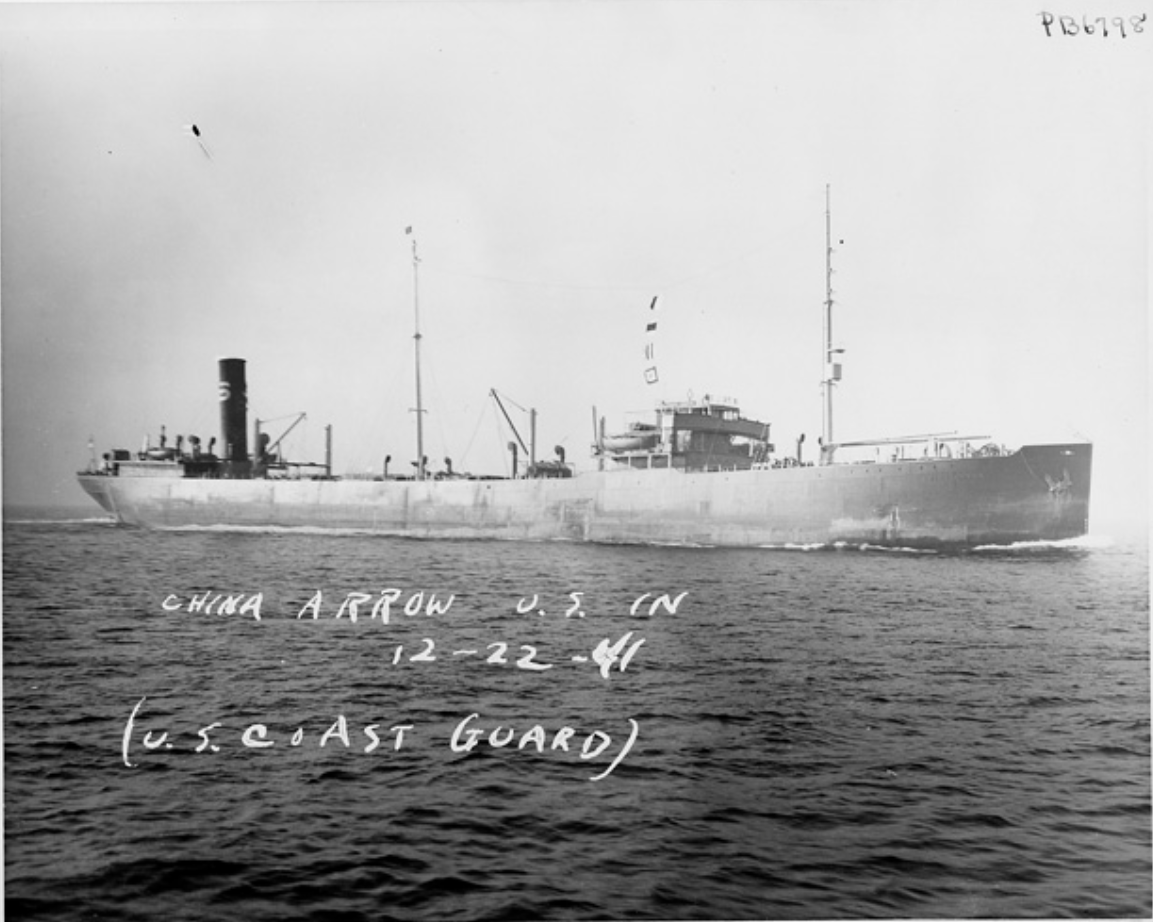
SS China Arrow on December 22, 1941

Construction of SS China Arrow was contracted to the Bethlehem Shipbuilding Corporation in Quincy, Massachusetts, in 1920. She was launched on September 2, 1920, sponsored by Fredericka H. Fales. The tanker was completed on September 30, conducting her sea trials the next day in Massachusetts Bay.

China Arrow's first voyage had her depart from Port Arthur, Texas, on October 12, 1920. The tanker carried 10,640 tons of oil bound for several Chinese ports. The tanker sailed through the Panama Canal, briefly stopping in San Francisco before arriving in China, reaching Tianjin on December 4. China Arrow returned to San Francisco with ballast on January 6, 1921, successfully completing her maiden voyage. The tanker would conduct three more similar trips before being laid up with several other vessels in August 1921 due to a shortage of cargo. She was reactivated in September, remaining in East Asia for the next year. Aside from visiting her namesake country, China Arrow also visited Hong Kong and several ports in Imperial Japan.

China Arrow was removed from East Asia service in 1928, having a largely uneventful career in North America aside from an incident on July 26, 1938. The tanker nearly collided with fishing trawler Dorchester while rounding Graves Light off of Nahant. The two ships narrowly avoided collision, going just slow enough as to scrape one another's sides. It was planned to retire her in January 1939, but she was pressed back into service following severe shipping losses in the early stages of World War II. China Arrow was rebuilt for a cost of $450,000 by the Maryland Drydock Company. The tanker traveled twice to Vladivostok to deliver oil and motor fuel to the Soviet Union before being reassigned to her original route, where she would remain for the rest of her career.

At the end of January 1942, China Arrow departed Beaumont, Texas, carrying 81,773 bbl (13,000.9 m^{3}) of fuel oil to New York. On the morning of February 5, about 90 nautical miles (170 km; 100 mi) off the Virginia coast, U-103 fired two torpedoes, striking the tanker in holds 8, 9, and 10. While the firefighting system extinguished fires in two holds, it failed in hold 8, prompting Captain Paul Browne to order the crew to abandon ship. Three lifeboats were launched, leaving only the captain and the tanker's wireless operator who improvised an SOS after China Arrow's antenna was destroyed. After U-103 surfaced nearby, they left in a fourth lifeboat before the submarine shelled the tanker, sinking her stern-first. A United States Army Air Forces B-25A aircraft spotted the survivors and attacked the submarine, while the United States Navy patrol boat PE-56 and United States Coast Guard cutter Nike were dispatched. The lifeboats stayed together for three days before Nike rescued the crew on February 7, bringing them to Lewes, Delaware.

=== Dixie Arrow ===
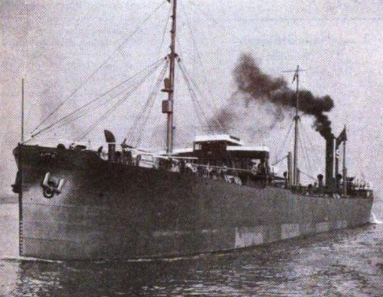
Dixie Arrow during her sea trials on November 23, 1921

SS Dixie Arrow was ordered on November 1, 1919, laid down in Camden on August 11, 1920, making her the last ship of the class to be built. Sponsored and christened by Isabelle Brown of Dallas, Texas, she was launched on September 29. The tanker underwent her sea trials on November 23, and was handed over to Socony on November 29.

Dixie Arrow initially served in East Asia like her sisters, carrying various vegetable oils to Manila after dropping her cargo off in Hong Kong. She carried these oils in her tween deck during her return voyage to the United States. After serving only two years in this capacity, Dixie Arrow was rerouted to all of North America to service ports in New England, Texas, and California. The tanker carried general freight in addition to her regular cargo, occasionally carrying bunker fuel to the Panama Canal for use by transiting vessels. California was removed from the Dixie Arrow's route in 1931, and she began to regularly carry case oil up and down the east coast of the United States. Following the United States' entry into World War II, the tanker began carrying oil to be used in the production of war matériel.

On March 19, 1942, Dixie Arrow left Texas City, Texas, bound for the city of Paulsboro, New Jersey. She carried 86,136 bbl (13,694.5 m^{3}) of crude oil to be used for the Allied war effort, following a forty-fathom (240 ft; 73 m) curve off Cape Hatteras due to the captain's concerns about the shallow depth of the water. The tanker soon sailed into the hunting grounds of German U-boats, and was torpedoed thrice on March 26 by U-71 just around 9:00 AM. Dixie Arrow broke in two due to the explosions. Able seaman Oscar Chappell turned the tanker into the wind to save crewmen trapped by fire on the bow, but was killed by the flames in doing so. Only one of the tanker's lifeboats safely made it away, the other three either being destroyed in the initial explosions or being succumbed by the fire that had engulfed the tanker. The crew was never able to send a distress signal.

The US Navy destroyer USS Tarbell arrived around 9:30 AM, roughly half an hour after Dixie Arrow had been torpedoed. She had been guided by a US Navy seaplane sent from Naval Operating Base Norfolk, which itself had been sent to the scene by a US Coast Guard aircraft that had witnessed the tanker's torpedoing. The destroyer dropped multiple depth charges in hopes of sinking the submarine, though none of them did anything to harm it. USS Tarbell rescued 22 of the tanker's 33-man crew, taking them to Morehead City, North Carolina. The survivors were later transferred to Norfolk, Virginia, for better conditions.

=== Empire Arrow ===
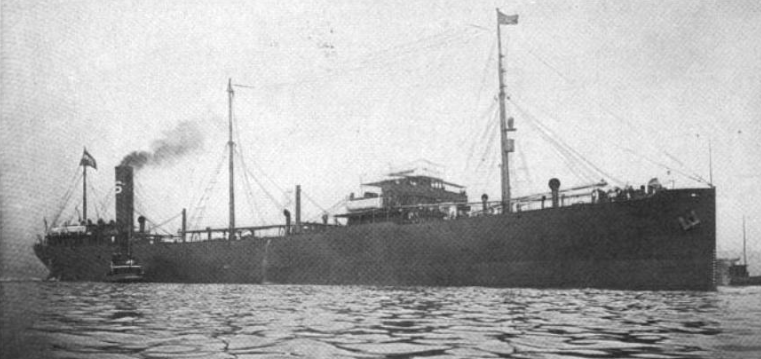
SS Empire Arrow undergoing her sea trials in October 1921

The keel of SS Empire Arrow was laid on September 14, 1920. She was launched on May 24, 1921, from New York Shipbuilding Corporation's South Yard Slipway No. 2 in Camden, New Jersey. The tanker was commissioned on August 7 and completed in September of that year.

Empire Arrow's first voyages were complete circumnavigations, sailing from both the east and west coasts of the United States while bound for the Philippines, China, Japan, and other places in East Asia. The tanker refueled and reloaded her cargo in the Dutch East Indies before conducting backhauls to mainland Europe and the United Kingdom. She was withdrawn from foreign service in 1933, carrying oil from Beaumont, Texas, to New York.

The tanker was in the waters off of New England in 1938 when a hurricane struck, severely damaging the tanker. After being sold in December of that year to Northern Metals Company, the tanker was sent to Philadelphia, Pennsylvania, where she arrived on January 10, 1939. The tanker was broken up that year.

=== India Arrow ===
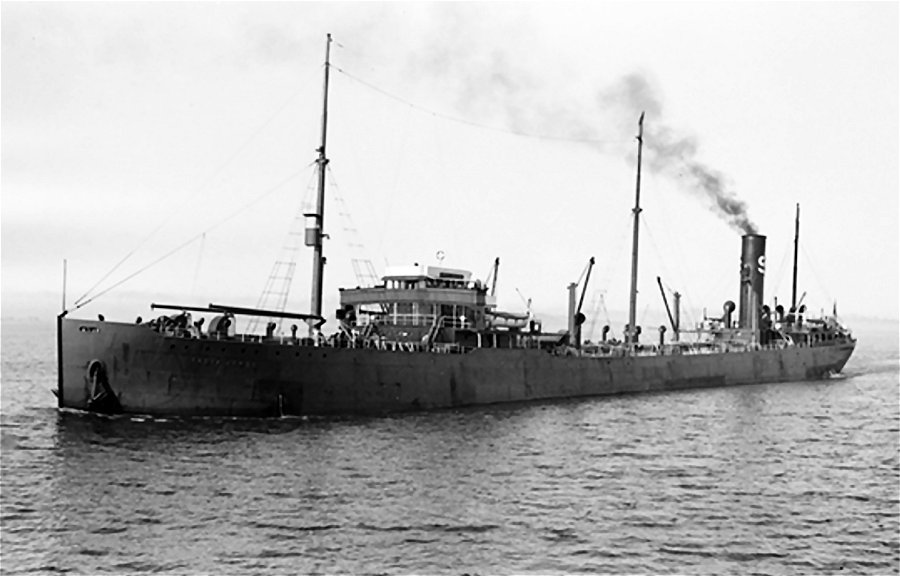
SS India Arrow in 1921

SS India Arrow was laid by the Bethlehem Shipbuilding Company down on March 3, 1920, and launched in the Fore River early the next year on January 28, 1921. She was sponsored by Mrs. Harry Dundas, wife of the manager of Standard Transportation Company's British India branch. The tanker conducted her sea trials in Massachusetts Bay on February 25 and 26, and was transferred to her owners on March 17.

India Arrow was docked in Boston for six months due to an overabundance of ships and a scarcity of cargo. Once underway, however, the tanker sailed from New York to East Asia via the Panama Canal, making backhaul stops in Sumatra's Dutch oil fields and then to Rotterdam via the Suez Canal. Then, after arriving in New York, the tanker would complete the same voyage in reverse. In September 1923, the tanker stumbled across a damaged Standard Arrow in the Pacific Ocean, and towed her sister ship 800 miles (1,300 km) to Yokahama, Japan. India Arrow was transferred to the oil service up and down the east coast in 1930, with an occasional voyage through the Panama Canal to the west coast.

On her final voyage, India Arrow was bound for Carteret, New Jersey, sailing from Corpus Christi, Texas. On the evening of February 4, 1942, she was torpedoed thirty-five miles (56 km) east of Five Fathom Bank by U-103. The tanker caught fire and began to sink from the stern, the crew sending out a distress signal but not the tanker's location. The U-boat began shelling India Arrow from about 250 yards (230 m), firing a total of seven shells at two-minute intervals. Only one lifeboat was successfully launched, with the others either catching fire or flipping over in the oily water. The twelve survivors were picked up by the fishing skiff Gitana and taken to Ocean City, New Jersey, on February 6.

=== Japan Arrow ===
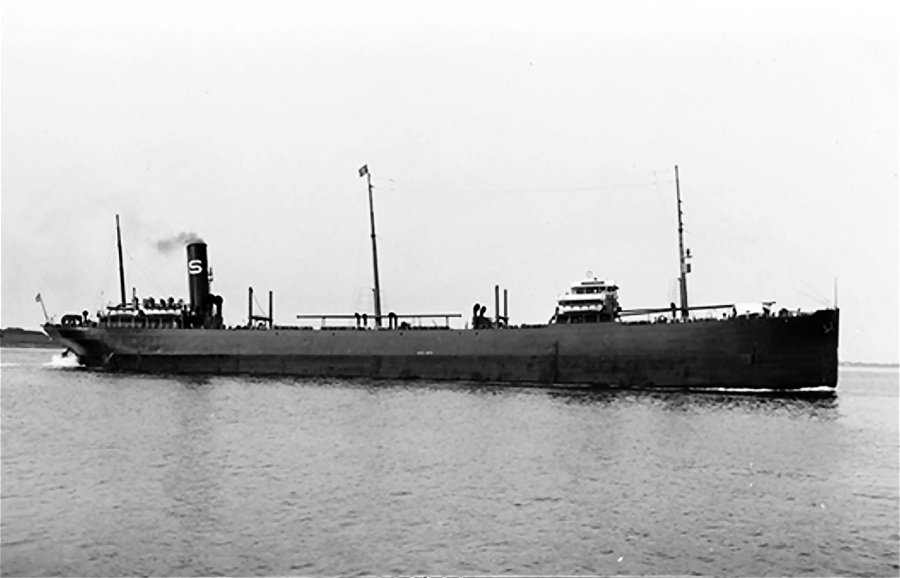
SS Japan Arrow photographed on August 17, 1929

The tanker SS Japan Arrow was launched by the Bethlehem Shipbuilding Company on October 23, 1920, and entered service on November 24. The tanker did not operate in East Asia until August 1925, when she departed the US bound for India via the Suez Canal. Japan Arrow carried oil to nearly all of the countries in East Asia save for her namesake, Japan. Her only experience in the country was when she ran aground near Fuzhou, China, in April 1921 and was towed to Yokahama for fuel and repairs.

She was transferred to the east coast in 1930, carrying oil from Texas to New England save for one voyage in 1939. On that voyage, Japan Arrow carried a fractionating column from New Jersey to Beaumont Texas, to be used in an oil refinery owned by Magnolia Petroleum Company. Cradles were welded to the side of the tanker, and her port list was compensated for by extra ballast in the cargo tanks on the starboard side.

In early 1942, Japan Arrow was renamed to American Arrow to avoid any association with the country and its ideas. She was acquired by the War Shipping Administration in March 1942 and placed into war service, sailing from Abadan, Iran, to ports in South Africa, Australia, and India. After ownership of American Arrow was given to the US government in September 1944, the tanker's name changed once more, this time to Chotauk. The tanker served in the Pacific for the remainder of the war, receiving three campaign medals for her service. After being decommissioned on February 7, 1946, Chotauk was sold to the M. S. Kaplan Company for scrapping, The tanker was broken up at New Orleans in May 1947 by the Southern Shipwrecking Company.

=== Java Arrow ===
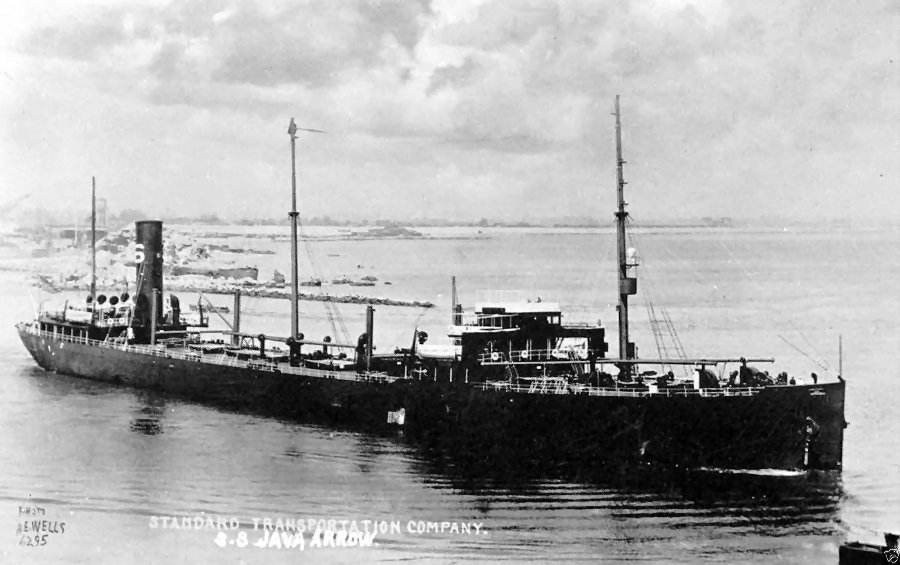
SS Java Arrow in 1921

Constructed by the Bethlehem Shipbuilding Company, SS Java Arrow was launched on April 30, 1921, and entered service on May 24 of that year. The tanker's very first voyage was to India via the Suez Canal, with a backhaul stop in Balikpapan, a city in the Dutch East Indies. Java Arrow sailed East Asia many times until 1931, when she was transferred to the American east coast.

In February 1926, Java Arrow was sailing from Singapore to the United States when it discovered Daishin Maru No. 3, a wrecked Japanese cargo ship. After her 17 crew members were rescued, the wreck was later located by the Japanese government and taken to Yokohama for repairs.

Java Arrow was taken by the War Shipping Administration (WSA) in 1942 and pressed into service with the United States Merchant Marine. During her first voyage, on May 5, 1942, Java Arrow was torpedoed by a German U-boat eight miles (13 km) off the Florida coast. The tanker was damaged but not sunk, and was towed to Port Everglades in June. She was later taken to Norfolk, Virginia, for permanent repairs. She was renamed Celtic in US Navy service, later Karry Patch under the US Coast Guard, and survived through the remainder of the war. She served as a station tanker while operating in the Pacific theater.

The veteran tanker of World War II was decommissioned on February 6, 1946, in Mobile, Alabama. She was transferred once more to the WSA for her planned disposal on Christmas Eve of that year. For unknown reasons, Celtic's decommissioning was delayed until 1948, where she was purchased by Radocean Tanker Corporation and renamed Radketch. The tanker changed owners and names several times over the coming years: She was known as Gale under Soc. Armadora Valenciana and the Commander Trading Corporation in 1949 and 1952, and then as Sugar under Marine Charters Inc. in 1955. She was finally sold in January 1959 to Cantieri Navali del Golfo, and broken up at La Spezia in March.

=== Levant Arrow ===
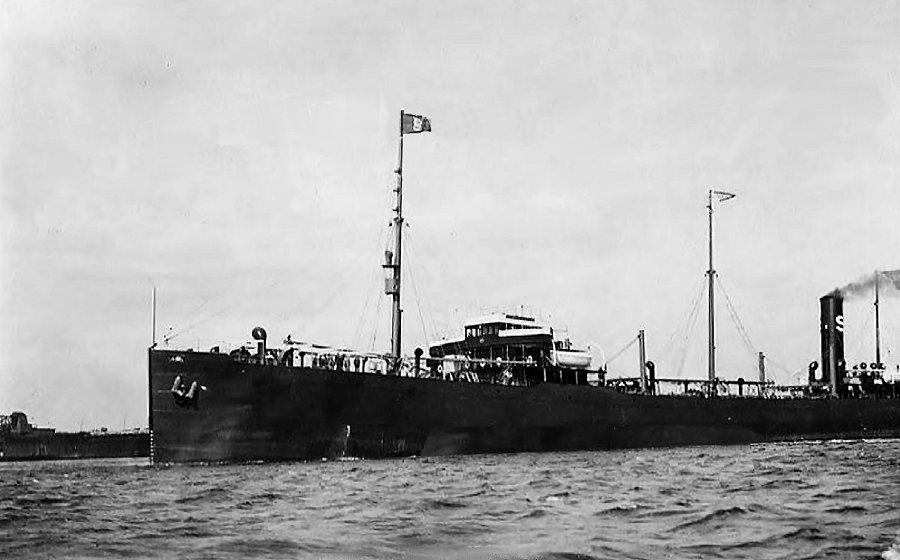
SS Levant Arrow in 1927

The tanker SS Levant Arrow was ordered on April 1, 1920, and her keel was laid on November 4 of that year. She was launched on July 25, 1921, by New York Shipbuilding Corporation, and completed in October 1921.

The tanker's route took her from New England, through the Panama Canal, to west coast cities like San Pedro, and then across the Pacific to Chinese ports such as Dalian. No notable incidents occurred over the course of Levant Arrow's seventeen-year career. The tanker arrived in Philadelphia for scrapping on December 12, 1938, and was broken up by Northern Metals Company in early 1939.

=== Royal Arrow ===
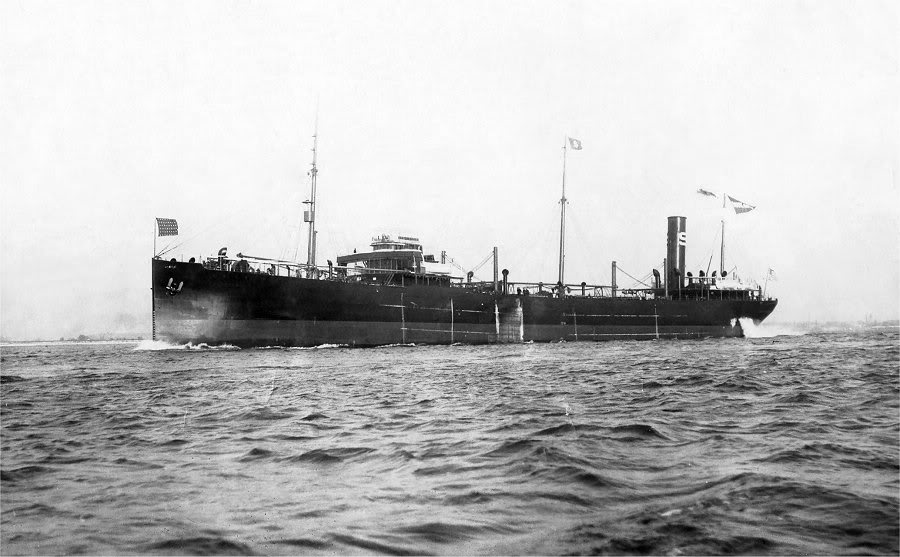
SS Royal Arrow undergoing her sea trials in 1916

SS Royal Arrow was the second Arrow-class oil tanker to be built, launched by New York Shipbuilding Corporation on October 30, 1916. She was completed on December 16, and handed over to Socony shortly after.

The tanker sailed for six round trips from Baton Rouge, Louisiana, and New York, before being sent to the Pacific Ocean for the foreign petroleum trade there. She stayed in the Pacific for the remainder of World War I, being commandeered by the US government to carry coconut oil and copra from the Philippines to the mainland US. Royal Arrow returned to the east coast of the United States in 1922, transferred back to Socony, and would remain there for 19 years, carrying oil between Texas and New England.

On August 24, 1940, the Federal Maritime Commission approved the sale of Royal Arrow and her sister, Sylvan Arrow, to the Petroleum Shipping Company of Panama, a subsidiary of Socony-Vacuum Oil. This came after the passage of the Neutrality Act in November 1939, where many shipping companies transferred ownership of their vessels to a neutral registry in order to bypass the limitations of the act. Royal Arrow was further transferred to Brilliant Transportation Company in April 1941, and her registry was changed to Panamanian.

Upon the US entry into World War II, the tanker was requisitioned for the conflict by the WSA. A gun was installed on the tanker's bow, and she carried war materiel from places like Iran, Australia, and India. She returned to the US in December 1945, still flying the Panamanian flag. When Royal Arrow's final year-by-year certificate expired in December 1946, she was sold as a "going unit" to Corrada Societa Di Navigazione of Genoa, Italy. The tanker was renamed to Laura Corrado, serving the Italian company in the Adriatic. She arrived at the breakers yard at La Spezia, Italy, on July 7, 1959. There, she was scrapped by Cantieri Navali del Golfo.

=== Standard Arrow ===
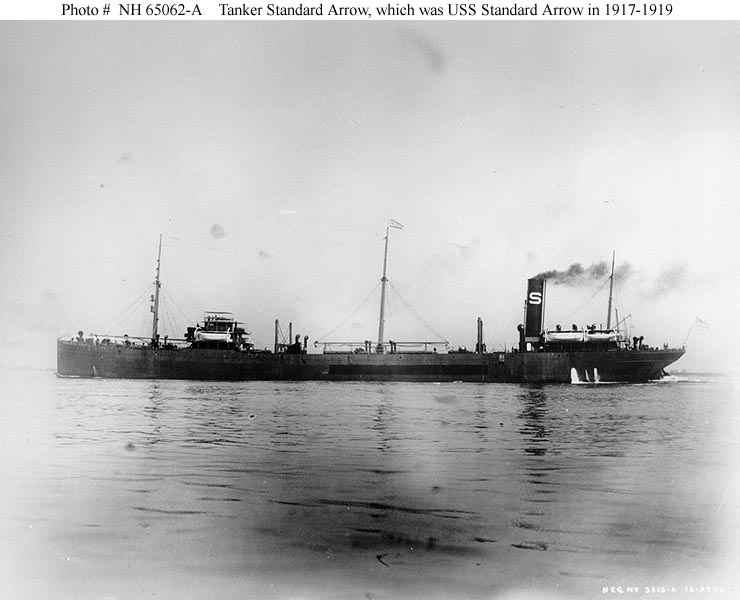
SS Standard Arrow sometime in 1916 or 1917

SS Standard Arrow was the first Arrow-class ship to be built, constructed in May 1916 and first operated by Standard Transportation Company. She was acquired by the US Navy on a bareboat charter and commissioned on August 22, 1917. The tanker was given to the Naval Overseas Transportation Service on January 9, 1918, and assigned to duty in the Atlantic. She departed New York on bound for Devonport, England, arriving on February 4. That same day, she collided with a fellow American tanker, SS Norman Bridge. Standard Arrow discharged her cargo to the tanker USS Maumee, returned to New York, and was placed in drydock until February 25. The tanker reacquired her cargo and made six more trips to Europe before being decommissioned, returned to the Shipping Board, and handed back over to Socony on February 13, 1919.

In September 1923, Standard Arrow was damaged in a storm while sailing through the Pacific Ocean. She was located by her younger sister, India Arrow, and was towed 800 miles (1,300 km) to Yokahama, Japan, for repairs.

Standard Arrow was taken by the US Navy on April 4, 1944. She was commissioned on the same date and renamed USS Signal, supporting the war in the Pacific and carrying oil for Service Squadron 10, which was based at the Majuro and Ulithi atolls. The tanker would remain in service with the Navy until February 20, 1946, where she was returned to her owners and her name was changed back Standard Arrow. She was struck from the Navy's register on March 12, and continued merchant service for roughly a year. The tanker was sold to H. H. Buncher company in early 1947. She was broken up in Mobile, Alabama, in April 1947, by Liberty Industrial Salvage Inc.

=== Sylvan Arrow ===
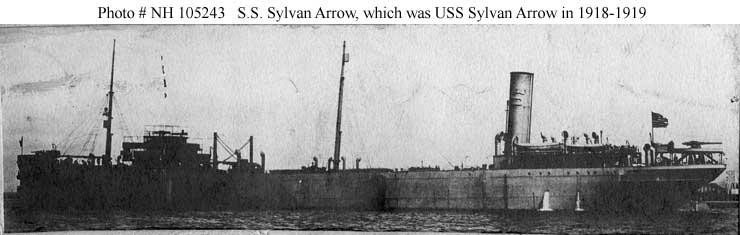
SS Sylvan Arrow in early 1918

SS Sylvan Arrow was launched on October 16, 1917, and commissioned on January 5, 1918. The tanker was immediately pressed into war service, making three transatlantic voyages with war materiel before being acquired by the Naval Overseas Transportation Service in July 1918. She conducted three voyages under the US Navy, carrying oil and biplanes before she was decommissioned on January 21, 1919, and returned to Socony.

The tanker conducted eleven long hauls in the Pacific, transferred to the east coast in 1930. She continued this service until April 1941, when both she and Royal Arrow were transferred to the Brilliant Transportation Company. Shortly after, Sylvan Arrow began flying the Panamanian flag.

In April 1942, the tanker was requisitioned by the WSA while docked in Norfolk, Virginia. She sailed to the Caribbean, joining a convoy of tankers leaving Curaçao bound for Cape Town. On May 20, 1942, Sylvan Arrow was torpedoed by the German submarine U-155. The tanker proceeded to catch fire and was abandoned. A majority of the crew escaped and were picked up by the US destroyer USS Barney. The tanker continued to sail, burning, and was spotted by a returning convoy on May 26. A salvage tug began to tow Sylvan Arrow, before the tanker began to fold in the middle and sank on May 28, 75 miles (121 km) from Trinidad.

=== Yankee Arrow ===
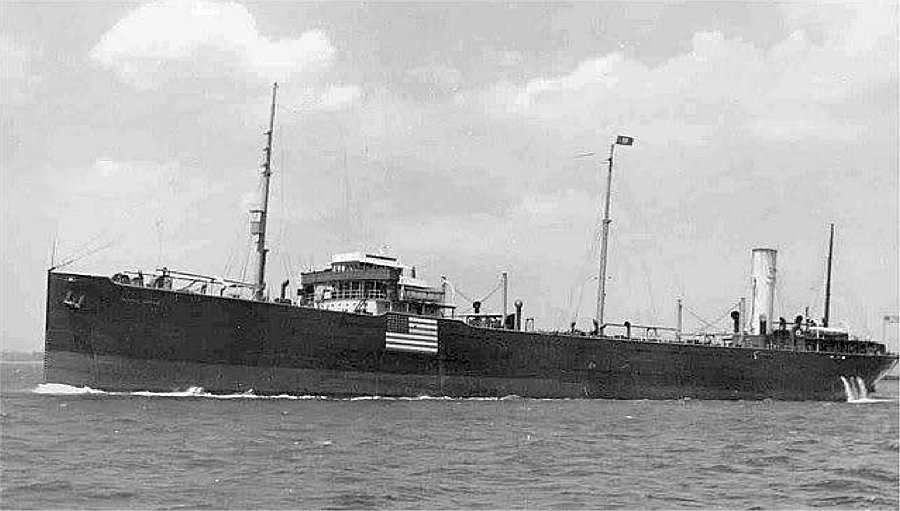
SS Yankee Arrow with an American neutrality marking on her port side

SS Yankee Arrow was launched by New York Shipbuilding Corporation on May 10, 1921, and was completed on August 2 of the same year. The tanker had no notable incidents during her pre-World War II service. After the war's outbreak, she began carrying oil to support the Allies, joining the North African campaign in 1942.

On August 2, 1943, the tanker was sailing in a convoy from Annaba, Algeria, to Bizerte, Tunisia. The convoy began forming a single column to enter the Tunisian port. Sailing off Cape Bon, Yankee Arrow suddenly struck a naval mine off her port bow. The tanker was engulfed by a fire that was brought under control about half an hour later. Her crew did not abandon ship, though the initial blast blew several sailors overboard. Yankee Arrow was heavily damaged and deemed unfit for further war service, being purchased by the WSA and serving as fuel storage off Sicily for several years. The tanker was finally laid up in the port of Marseille, France, in July 1945. In 1948, she was sold to F. Heuvelmans in Antwerp, Belgium. Yankee Arrow was scrapped towards the end of the year.

== See also ==
- Arrow-class gunvessel, Royal Navy ships of a class sharing the same name
- Cedric-class patrol boat, a class of ships originally named the Arrow class
- T2 tanker, class of oil tanker built in the US during World War II
