= Backhaul (trucking) =

In trucking, a backhaul is a hauling cargo back from point B to the originating point A. Since it costs almost as much time to drive empty as fully loaded, the truck is often hired to carry revenue cargo on both the outbound and backhaul legs of a cargo route. This makes economic sense, since it helps to pay for the operating expenses for the trip back to the originating point A for the trucking company and/or trucker. This is a big problem often overlooked in the trucking industry especially because truckers get high-paying loads to offset the empty rig they drive back to the load up point.
