= Ship Characteristics Board =

US Navy unit tasked with coordinating ship design

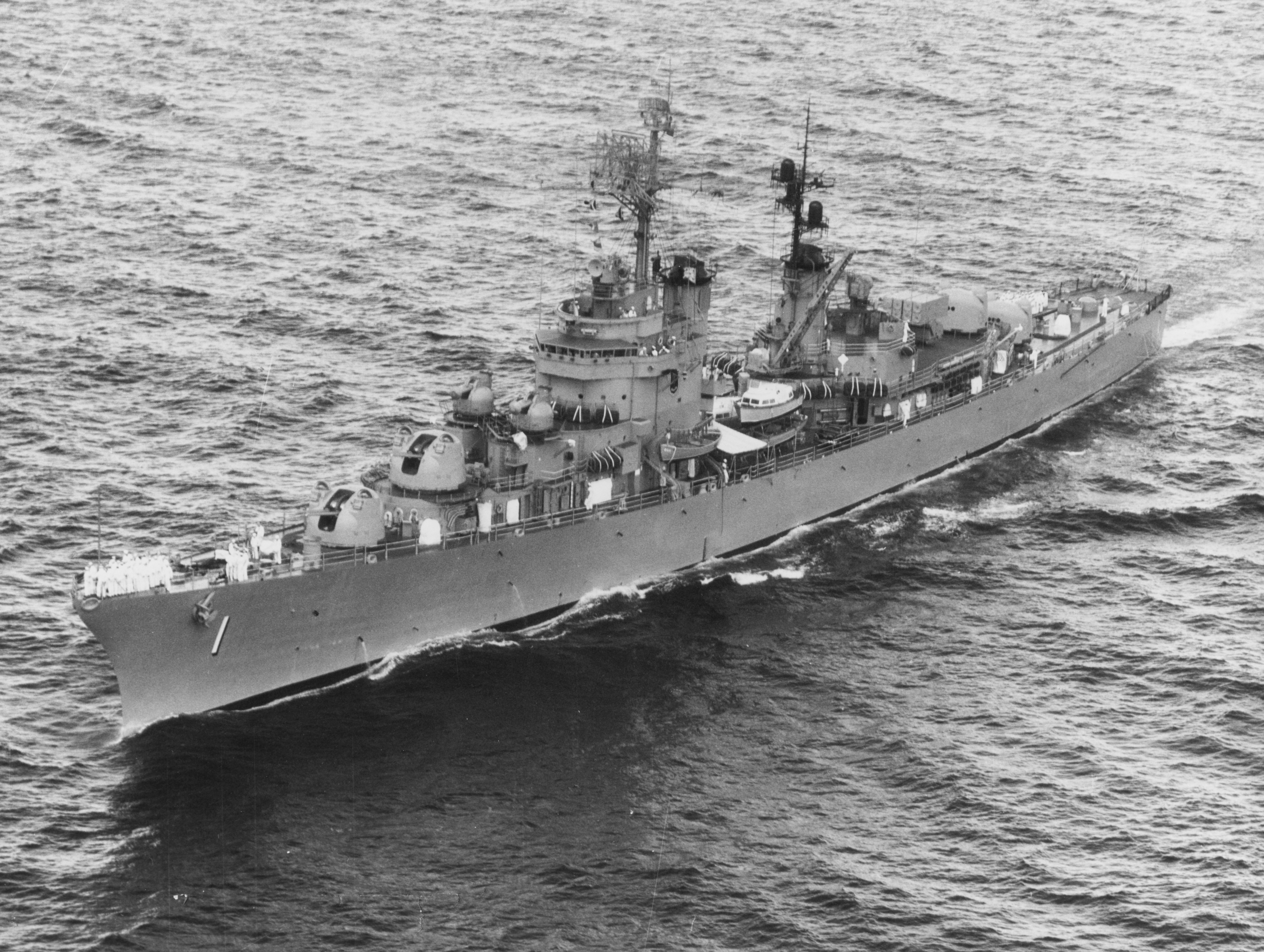
Project SCB 1 result: the USS Norfolk (CLK-1/DL-1)

The Ship Characteristics Board was a unit of the United States Navy.

The purpose of the Ship Characteristics Board was to coordinate the creation of 'ship characteristics' that are essential to the design of naval combatants and auxiliaries. Coordination was required because the operators and the designers of ships had different interests, perceptions, concepts, and constraints: as summarized by the naval historian Norman Friedman, "How to achieve the best possible compromise among competing bureaus has been one of the great dilemmas of 20th-century U.S. naval administration."

This list of SCB projects is a useful exposition of the U.S. Navy's shipbuilding priorities in the first half of the Cold War.

== History ==
The Ship Characteristics Board was founded in 1945 under the Office of the Chief of Naval Operations / OpNav. It was created after the body previously responsible for coordinating ships characteristics, the General Board, had been seen as ineffective in a series of earlier Navy bureau mis-coordinations. The SCB would adjudicate between operational requirements set by the ship operators (the fleets and other operational forces) and the technological and fiscal constraints imposed on the ship designers (the Bureau of Ships / BuShips and the Bureau of Ordnance / BuOrd).

The SCB had nowhere near the same stature as its predecessor [the General Board], since in effect it was separated from the policy- and strategy-planning process. It was far more concerned with the details of design, and included representatives of all the bureaus, who had equal votes. Participants in SCB meetings recall cases in which the Bureau of Medicine and Surgery cast the decisive vote on weapons systems choices. From the surviving records it is not entirely clear who within OpNav worked up the lists of projects on which the SCB worked, at least at first. For a time that was both very important, given the poverty of the [post-World War Two] shipbuilding program and the lack of any integrated U.S. concept of future warfare.

The SCB assigned numbers to its projects beginning in 1946. Not all projects would result in the construction of ships: some projects would remain conceptual only, or would be superseded by later projects.

In 1966 the successors to BuShips and BuOrd (NAVSHIPS and NAVORD) were moved to report to OpNav. The SCB role as an adjudicator became less relevant. During the development of the Oliver Hazard Perry class frigates it was renamed the Ship Acquisition and Improvement Board (SAIB). In the 1980s it was revived as the Ship Characteristics Improvement Board (SCIB), but without its former authority.

=== USS Thresher loss ===
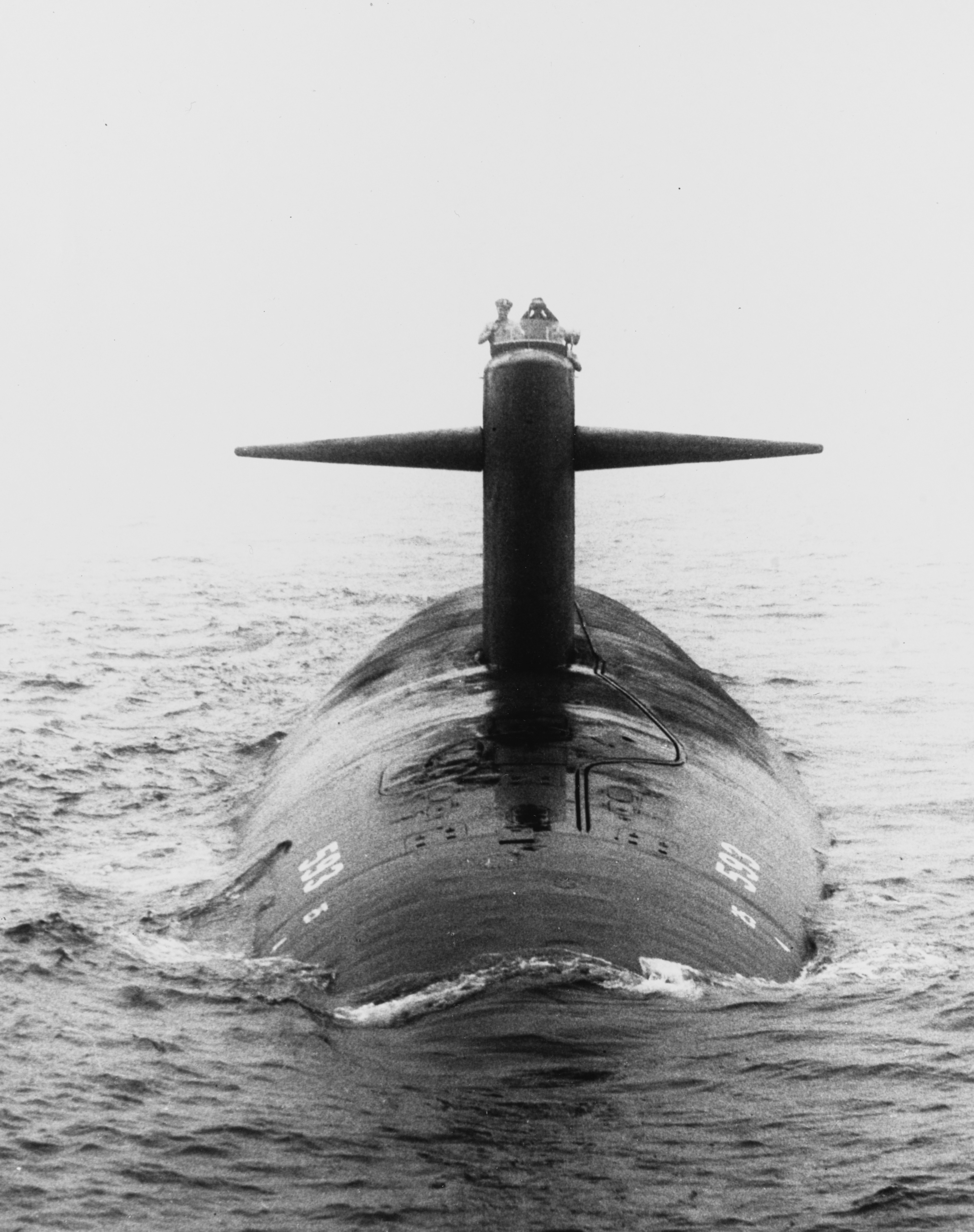
Thresher, the first result of project SCB 188, at sea on 24 July 1961

A decision by the SCB likely contributed to the 1963 loss of the nuclear submarine Thresher. The SCB had ordered BuShips to study increasing the test depth for future submarines from 700 to 1,600 feet, and this increase was approved after November 1956. Thresher's components were too far along in design to accommodate this change, but it was decided that they could be modified to enable a test depth of 1,300 feet. The irony is that the SCB's motives for this change were to enhance safety: not only to support greater combat survivability, but also out of a concern that the increased speed of nuclear submarines could cause them to inadvertently exceed the more shallow test depths while maneuvering.

== List of SCB projects ==
Review of the following lists of SCB projects will show:

- SCB projects which are 'follow on' to earlier projects may be given a new number, or may reuse an earlier number with an appended letter. For example, a project to develop a new Landing Craft Utility (LCU) was begun in 1946 as SCB 25, follow on LCU projects include SCB 25A (unknown date), SCB 149 (August 1954), and SCB 149B (March 1962). Note the eight-year gap between SCB 149 and SCB 149B.
- The start date of an SCB project can be several years before it became a budget line item or an actual ship construction. SCB 157 began in July 1955 as a study for a new amphibious assault helicopter carrier, but a resultant ship (the future Iwo Jima) was not laid down until 2 April 1959. An even more extreme example is SCB 123, which began in 1954, but which saw last ship reconstruction delayed until 1966.
- Close examination of SCB projects will occasionally demonstrate that ship design history is more complicated than first appearances show. For example, the George Washington class of fleet ballistic missile submarines was the first such class to be launched. However, the history of SCB 180 shows that the Ethan Allen class was the first to be designed, and the George Washington class was a subsequent design made for a quickly implemented mobilization effort.
- The budgetary pressures of the Vietnam War, including war driven inflation, are demonstrated in the cancellation of SCB projects 003.68 and 101.68, and the partial cancellation of SCB 002 (the age of the ships was also a factor).

All ship hull classification symbols shown (CLK, SS, DL, CVA, DE, etc.) are the symbols in use at the conception of the project, rather than when construction started. Explanations of these symbols are usually to be found in the linked articles on each ship or class.

=== Sequential numbering of SCB projects ===
SCB projects began in numeric sequence in 1946, and were originally listed in descending priority (the Norfolk hunter-killer cruiser/destroyer leader having top priority, the Tang submarines as second priority, etc.), but such prioritization was eventually dropped. Several of the early projects actually began in 1945 - for example, the Mitscher-class destroyer (which in 1946 was assigned the project number SCB 5) was the ship design that on paper out-performed the projected CL-154 class light cruiser design and led to that cruiser's cancellation in September 1945.

SCB #	Start date	Description	Notes
SCB 1	1946	Norfolk CLK	
SCB 2	1946	Tang class SS	
SCB 2A		Grayback SS original design (see SCB 161)	
SCB 3	1946	Closed cycle engine SSX concept	
SCB 4	1946	CVA concept, merged into SCB 6 by Jun 1946	
SCB 5	1946	Mitscher class DL	
SCB 6	1946	Strategic CVA (aircraft carrier) concept	
SCB 6A		United States class CVA, cancelled 23 Apr 1949	
SCB 7	1946	30 kt DE concept	
SCB 7A		Fletcher class DD ASW mobilization concept	
SCB 8	1946	CVE ASW concept, became SCB 43	
SCB 9	1946	15 kt LST concept	
SCB 9A		Terrebonne Parish-class tank landing ship	
SCB 10	1946	AKA Arctic conversion concept	
SCB 11	1946	CLI Cruiser-icebreaker Arctic picket concept	
SCB 11A		Glacier AGB	
SCB 12	1946	MIGRAINE II SSR conversions: Burrfish, Requin, Spinax and Tigrone	
SCB 12A		MIGRAINE III SSR conversions: Pompon, Rasher, Raton, Ray, Redfin, and Rock	
SCB 13	1946	Northampton CLC	
SCB 14	1946	Paul Revere class APA	
SCB 14E		APA conversion of SS Monterey and SS Mariposa	
SCB 15	1946	Tulare class AKA	
SCB 16	1946	Fast AGC concept	
SCB 17	1946	Fast LSD concept	
SCB 18	1946	LSM Underwater Object Locator conversion concept	
SCB 19	1946 (Dec 1945)	Kentucky BB anti-air concept	
SCB 20	1946	Steel hulled PT concept	
SCB 21	1946	Radiological salvage vessel concept, later ATR rescue tug concept	
SCB 22	1946	Fast AOR concept, led to commissioning of ex-war prize Conecuh as a test	
SCB 22A		YAG conversion concept	
SCB 23	1946	Fast AK concept	
SCB 24	1946	Midget SS concept	
SCB 25	1946	LCU 1466	
SCB 25A		LCU 1608	
SCB 26	1946	Hawaii CB aircraft carrier conversion concept	
SCB 26A	1948	Hawaii CB missile conversion concept	
SCB 27	1946	Oriskany CVA jet aircraft conversion	
SCB 27A		Essex class CVA modification: 8 ships (Note: SCB-27A modifications were Essex, Yorktown, Hornet, Randolph, Wasp, Bennington, Kearsarge, and Lake Champlain)	
SCB 27B		Essex class CVA partial conversion, canceled	
SCB 27C		Essex class CVA modification: 6 ships (Note: SCB-27C modifications were Intrepid, Ticonderoga, Lexington, Hancock, Bon Homme Richard, and Shangri-La)	
SCB 28	1946	Tunny SSG conversion	
SCB 29	1946	LSD Arctic conversions: Gunston Hall and Lindenwald	
SCB 30	1946	ASSP conversions: Perch and Sealion	
SCB 31	1946	Barbero ASSA conversion	
SCB 32	1946	Fast LST concept	
SCB 33	1946	SSG (guided missile submarine) concept	
SCB 34	1946	SSV F2Y seaplane carrier submarine concept	
SCB 35	Dec 1946	Barracuda class SSK	
SCB 36	1948	New LCS(L) concept, merged into SCB 37	
SCB 37	1948	Carronade LSM(R)	
SCB 38		Colorado BB radio control target conversion concept	
SCB 39		Guavina SSO conversion	
SCB 40		SSE (submarine ammunition carrier) concept	
SCB 41		CVL ASW conversion, became SCB 54	
SCB 42		LSD to AV conversion concept	
SCB 43		CVE ASW concepts, cancelled Apr 1954	
SCB 44		Aviation stores issue ship (AVS) concept	
SCB 45		AMS concept	
SCB 45A		Agile class MSO and Acme class MSO	
SCB 45B		Ability class MSO	
SCB 46		DER conversions: 6 ships	
SCB 46A		DER conversions: Vandivier and Wagner	
SCB 46B		DER conversions: 28 ships	
SCB 47		GUPPY II SS conversions	
SCB 47A		GUPPY IA SS conversions	
SCB 47B		Fleet snorkel SS conversions	
SCB 47C		GUPPY IIA SS conversions	
SCB 48		Boston class CAG Terrier missile conversions	
SCB 49		Altair class AKS conversion	
SCB 50		AOR conversion concept	
SCB 51		DE or PCE concept, became SCB 72	
SCB 52		Submersible barge concept for launching V-2 rockets	
SCB 53		DDE conversion	
SCB 54		CVL ASW conversion	
SCB 56	1949	Albacore AGSS Phase I	
SCB 57		Denebola-class AF conversion: 4 ships	
SCB 58	1949	Grouper SSK conversion	
SCB 59		Cylindrical Countermeasures (XMAP) minesweeping device	
SCB 60		LVT modernization	
SCB 60A		LVT(A)5 modernization	
SCB 60B		LVT(3) modernization	
SCB 61		Yard and district craft characteristics	
SCB 61A		YR characteristics	
SCB 61B		YON characteristics	
SCB 61C		YFN characteristics	
SCB 61D		YRB characteristics, became SCB 61N	
SCB 61E		YC characteristics	
SCB 61F		YFB characteristics	
SCB 61G		YCF characteristics	
SCB 61H		YOGN characteristics	
SCB 61J		YRBM characteristics	
SCB 61K		YDT characteristics	
SCB 61L		YFR characteristics	
SCB 61M		YNG characteristics	
SCB 61N		YRB characteristics	
SCB 61P		YTN characteristics	
SCB 61Q		YOG characteristics for JP-5	
SCB 61R		YTM characteristics with cycloidal propulsion	
SCB 62		Minesweeping boat (MSB)	
SCB 63		Tweedy DE ASW upgrade	
SCB 63A		Lewis DE ASW upgrade	
SCB 64	Mar 1950	Nautilus SSN	
SCB 64A	Mar 1950	Seawolf SSN	
SCB 65		X-1 midget SS	
SCB 66		SSM (submarine minelayer) conversion concept, cancelled 1 Oct 1952	
SCB 67	1950	Closed cycle engine SSX concept	
SCB 67A		Closed cycle engine SSX concept, cancelled 26 Oct 1953	
SCB 68	Apr 1950	Mackerel class SST	
SCB 69		Adjutant class MSC	
SCB 69A		MSC concept	
SCB 70		AD mobilization conversion concept	
SCB 71		AP mobilization conversion from SS United States concept	
SCB 72	Oct 1950	Dealey class DE	
SCB 73		ACMU conversions	
SCB 74		Various anti-air upgrades (e.g. Bofors 40 mm guns replaced with 3"/50 caliber guns)	
SCB 74A		Fletcher class DD anti-air upgrades: 40 ships	
SCB 74B		Light Cruisers anti-air upgrades	
SCB 74C		Heavy Cruisers anti-air upgrades	
SCB 74D		Juneau anti-air upgrade	
SCB 74E		Iowa class BB anti-air upgrade concept	
SCB 75	Nov 1950	Thomaston class LSD	
SCB 76		Mobilization DD experiment concept	
SCB 77	Jul 1951	New AKA concept	
SCB 77A	Nov 1952	New AKA with ro-ro capability concept	
SCB 78		Paul Revere APA	
SCB 78A		Francis Marion APA	
SCB 79		DDR (destroyer radar picket) conversions	
SCB 80		Forrestal class CVA	
SCB 81		Technical stores issue ship (AKST) concept	
SCB 82		Neosho class AO	
SCB 83		Hawaii CBC conversion concept	
SCB 84		Sailfish class SSR	
SCB 85	Feb 1951	Forrest Sherman class DD	
SCB 85A		Forrest Sherman class (Hull sub-class) DD	
SCB 86		AK reactivation: Altair, Antares, Alcor and Betelgeuse	
SCB 87		AVP concept	
SCB 88		Gearing class DD completion concept	
SCB 89	May 1951	180-foot PC concept	
SCB 90	May 1951	290-foot PCE concept	
SCB 91		DM concept	
SCB 92		AGC concept	
SCB 93		AKA concept, canceled 4 Jan 1952	
SCB 94	Nov 1951	LCM(6)	
SCB 95		LCM(8)	
SCB 96		LCVP	
SCB 97		Rigel class AF	
SCB 98		ATR concept	
SCB 99		AE mobilization concept	
SCB 100		AF mobilization concept	
SCB 101		AR mobilization concept	
SCB 102		AVS mobilization concept	
SCB 103		ARH mobilization concept	
SCB 104		AK mobilization concept	
SCB 105		AK mobilization concept	
SCB 106		AKS mobilization concept	
SCB 107		AD mobilization concept	
SCB 108		AKST mobilization concept, canceled 26 Mar 1952	
SCB 109		Bittern ACMU	
SCB 110		Midway CVA and Franklin D Roosevelt CVA modernizations	
SCB 110A		Coral Sea CVA modernization	
SCB 111		AVP concept	
SCB 112		AO Arctic concept	
SCB 113		LST Arctic concept	
SCB 114		Suribachi class AE	
SCB 115		AVS (aviation stores ship)	
SCB 116		Darter SS (see also SCB 124)	
SCB 117		DE gas turbine engine, canceled 1955	
SCB 118		Barbero SSG conversion	
SCB 119	Nov 1953	De Soto County class LST	
SCB 120		AP mobilization conversion of passenger liners	
SCB 121		Skate class SSN	
SCB 122	May 1954	Thetis Bay CVHA conversion	
SCB 123		MCS conversions: Catskill, Ozark, Osage, Saugus, and Monitor (last 3 cancelled)	
SCB 124		Improved SCB 116: Growler SS original design (see SCB 161)	
SCB 125		Essex class CVA modification: 13 ships (Note: SCB-125 modifications were Essex, Yorktown, Intrepid, Hornet, Ticonderoga, Randolph, Lexington, Wasp, Hancock, Bennington, Bon Homme Richard, Kearsarge, and Shangri-La)	
SCB 125A		Oriskany CVA modification	
SCB 126		Guardian class AGR conversion	
SCB 127		Kitty Hawk class CVA, preliminary design	
SCB 127A		Kitty Hawk class CVA: Kitty Hawk and Constellation	
SCB 127B		Kitty Hawk class CVA follow on: America	
SCB 127C		Kitty Hawk class CVA follow on: John F. Kennedy	
SCB 128		LCPL	
SCB 128A		LCPL	
SCB 128B		LCPL	
SCB 129	May 1954	Farragut class DL	
SCB 130		Fletcher class DDC (destroyer corvette) conversion concept	
SCB 131	Jun 1954	Claude Jones class DE	
SCB 132		Triton SSRN	
SCB 133		ASRD concept	
SCB 134		Albemarle AV P6M seaplane modification	
SCB 135		Gyatt DDG conversion	
SCB 136		Cove MSI (inshore minesweeper)	
SCB 137		Halibut SSG original design with diesel-electric propulsion	
SCB 137A		Halibut SSGN final design with nuclear propulsion	
SCB 137B		SSGN concept with twice the missile load as Halibut	
SCB 138		ARC conversions: Aeolus and Thor	
SCB 139		YP-654 class	
SCB 140		Galveston class CLG Talos missile conversion	
SCB 140A		Galveston class CLG Talos missile flagship conversions: Little Rock and Oklahoma City	
SCB 141	1954	New LCM(3) concept	
SCB 142		Farragut class (Coontz sub-class) DLG	
SCB 143		Admirable class AM and Auk class AM conversion to PCE concepts	
SCB 144		Essex class CVS FRAM upgrade	
SCB 145		CVL angled flight deck concept	
SCB 146		Providence class CLG Terrier missile conversion: Topeka	
SCB 146A		Providence class CLG Terrier missile flagship conversions: Providence and Springfield	
SCB 147		YTB-752 class harbor tug	
SCB 147A		YTB-760 class	
SCB 148		unknown project	
SCB 149	Aug 1954	LCU 1620	
SCB 149B	Mar 1962	LCU 1625	
SCB 150		Barbel class SS	
SCB 151		Currituck AV P6M seaplane modification, cancelled 21 Aug 1959 after 52 days of construction	
SCB 152	Jul 1955	Fast catamaran LST with causeway concept	
SCB 153		Alternative CV concept, cancelled 14 Sep 1955, influenced SCB 127A and SCB 160	
SCB 154		Skipjack class SSN	
SCB 155	Aug 1955	Charles F. Adams class DDG	
SCB 156		AF conversion, canceled Nov 1955	
SCB 157	Jul 1955	Iwo Jima class LPH	
SCB 158		CN (nuclear cruiser) concept	
SCB 159		Block Island LPH conversion, cancelled 1958	
SCB 160		Enterprise CVAN	
SCB 161		Grayback and Growler SSG final design (see SCB 2A and 124)	
SCB 162	Apr 1956	LCM hydrofoil concept	
SCB 163		CN concept	
SCB 165		CN concept	
SCB 166		Original SSGN design of Thresher / Permit class	
SCB 166A		Improved SSGN design of Thresher / Permit class, changed to SSN under SCB 188	
SCB 167		CN concept	
SCB 168		CN concept	
SCB 169		Long Beach CGN	
SCB 170		Guavina AOSS conversion	
SCB 172		Leahy class DLG	
SCB 172A	Jun 1960	Belknap class DLG	
SCB 173		Albany class CG conversions	
SCB 173A		Baltimore class Polaris missile conversion concept	
SCB 174		Des Moines class CG conversion concept	
SCB 176		Commencement Bay class AV P6M seaplane conversion concept, cancelled 21 Aug 1959	
SCB 177		Tallahatchie County AVB conversion	
SCB 178		Tullibee SSN	
SCB 179		Victory ship conversion to survey ship concept	
SCB 180		Ethan Allen class SSBN	
SCB 180A		George Washington class SSBN	
SCB 182	1957	Albacore AGSS Phase III	
SCB 182A	1959	Albacore AGSS Phase IV	
SCB 183	1956	PCS concept	
SCB 184	1956	SC concept	
SCB 185		Conrad class AGOR	
SCB 187	Jan 1957	Raleigh class LPD	
SCB 187A		Raleigh class LPD with flagship facilities: La Salle	
SCB 187B		Austin class LPD	
SCB 188		Thresher / Permit class SSN	
SCB 188A		Sturgeon class SSN	
SCB 188M		Lengthened Permit class SSNs: Flasher, Greenling, and Gato	
SCB 189		Bainbridge DLGN	
SCB 190		Proteus AS modernization	
SCB 191		Terror Middle East force flagship conversion concept	
SCB 192		Oxford class AGTR conversion	
SCB 194		Hunley class AS	
SCB 196		Sacramento class AOE	
SCB 198		Glover AGFF conversion	
SCB 199		Bronstein class DE	
SCB 199A		Garcia class DE	
SCB 199B		Brooke class DE	
SCB 199C		Knox class DE	
SCB 202	Apr 1958	High Point PCH	
SCB 203		CVAN concept, became SCB 211	
SCB 205		AGMs for range instrumentation	
SCB 206	Nov 1958	Gearing class DD FRAM I	
SCB 207		Dolphin AGSS	
SCB 208		Mars class AFS	
SCB 211		CVAN concept	
SCB 211A		CVAN concept, cancelled in favor of SCB 127C	
SCB 212		Austere DDG (guided missile destroyer) concept, influenced SCB 172A	
SCB 214		Serrano AGS conversion	
SCB 215		Gilbert Islands AGMR conversion	
SCB 216		Lafayette class SSBN	
SCB 216A		Benjamin Franklin class SSBN	
SCB 216 Mod 3		James Madison class SSBN	
SCB 218	Aug 1960	Albemarle ASGL satellite launch concept	
SCB 219	1960	Plainview AGEH	
SCB 220		Nasty class PTF	
SCB 221	Aug 1960	52 foot UDT reconnaissance boat	
SCB 222		Truxtun DLGN	
SCB 223		GUPPY III SS FRAM	
SCB 224		Cimarron class AO jumbo conversion: Mispillion sub-class	
SCB 225		Kingsport AG conversion	
SCB 226		Silas Bent class AGS	
SCB 227	Mar 1961	Typhon DLGN concept	
SCB 228		Wright CC conversion	
SCB 229		Asheville class PGM	
SCB 231		NECPA CC concept	
SCB 232		Suribachi class AE modernization	
SCB 233		Norton Sound AVM modification	
SCB 234		Victory ship AS (submarine tender) conversion	
SCB 236		Sea Lift LSV	
SCB 238		Simon Lake class AS	
SCB 239		Seahawk DD concept	
SCB 240		Forrest Sherman class DDG Tartar missile conversion: 4 ships	
SCB 241		Mitscher class DDG Tartar missile conversion: 2 ships	
SCB 242		Sailfish SS FRAM II refit	
SCB 244		Samuel Gompers class AD	
SCB 245		Narwhal SSN	
SCB 247	Jun 1962	Newport class LST	
SCB 248	Nov 1962	Blue Ridge class LCC	
SCB 250		CVAN concept, canceled in favor of SCB 127C	
SCB 251		Forrest Sherman class (Barry sub-class) DD modernization with ASROC	
SCB 252	Jan 1964	Flagstaff PGH and Tucumari PGH	

=== Block numbering of SCB projects ===
By 1965 the numeric sequence was abandoned and SCB projects were organized by block numbers which arranged projects by ship types (valid until the 1975 ship reclassification), and a two digit suffix denoting the fiscal year of the construction phase of the project. This suffix is not the start date of the project as a concept: SCB 400.65 actually began in November 1962, not in 1965, and SCB 409.68 actually began in February 1965, not in 1968. The existence of successive suffixes also does not necessarily mean that the design of ships of a class in any way changed, such suffixes are listed here for historical note only.

In effect, this new numbering scheme changed the focus of the SCB from design and development to procurement and budget compliance. As a result, unbuilt concept-only designs would largely disappear from the historical record.

1965-1975 SCB block #	Ship type
001-099	Cruisers
100-199	Carriers
200-299	Destroyers/Frigates
_ 200-219	Destroyer Escorts
_ 220-239	Destroyers
_ 240-259	Frigates (past Destroyer Leaders)
_ 260-280	Patrol Frigates
300-399	Submarines
400-499	Amphibious
500-599	Mine Warfare
600-699	Patrol
700-799	Auxiliaries
800-899	Service Craft
900-999	Special Purpose

SCB #	Start date	Description	Notes
SCB 002		Albany class CG AAW modernization (Chicago partially only, Columbus cancelled)	
SCB 003.68		Boston class CAG AAW modernization, cancelled	
SCB 100.68		CVS ASW concept, became SCB 100.71	
SCB 100.71		CVS ASW concept	
SCB 101.66		Midway CVA modernization	
SCB 101.68		Franklin D. Roosevelt CVA modernization, cancelled	
SCB 102.67		Nimitz class CVN	
SCB 103.68		Franklin D. Roosevelt CVA austere refit	
SCB 200.65		Knox class DE (former SCB 199C)	
SCB 222.66		Forrest Sherman class DD ASW modernization (former SCB 251)	
SCB 223.67		DDG	
SCB 224		Spruance class DD	
SCB 226		Ticonderoga class DDG	
SCB 240.65	Mar 1961	Typhon DLGN concept (former SCB 227)	
SCB 241.66		California class DLGN	
SCB 243.66		Farragut class DLG upgrade	
SCB 244.66		Leahy class DLG upgrade	
SCB 246		Virginia class DLGN	
SCB 261		Oliver Hazard Perry class FFG	
SCB 300		Sturgeon-class SSN (former SCB 188A)	
SCB 301		NR-1	
SCB 302		Glenard P. Lipscomb SSN	
SCB 303		Los Angeles class SSN	
SCB 304		Ohio class SSBN	
SCB 350		Grayback LPSS conversion	
SCB 351		Halibut SSN conversion	
SCB 353		James Madison and Benjamin Franklin classes SSBN Poseidon C-3 missile conversion	
SCB 355		Lafayette and Benjamin Franklin classes SSBN Poseidon C-3 conversion	
SCB 400.65	Nov 1962	Blue Ridge class LCC (former SCB 248)	
SCB 401.65	Jul 1955	New Orleans LPH (former SCB 157)	,
SCB 402.65		Austin class LPD (former SCB 187B)	
SCB 403.65		Charleston class AKA	
SCB 404.65		Anchorage class LSD, lead ship only	
SCB 404.66		Anchorage class LSD, follow on ships	
SCB 405.65	Jun 1962	Newport class LST, lead ship only (former SCB 247)	,
SCB 405.66	Jun 1962	Newport class LST: follow on ships (former SCB 247)	,
SCB 406.65		LCU 1627	
SCB 409.68	Feb 1965	Tarawa class LHA	
SCB 500.66		Liberty ship MSS conversion concept	
SCB 501.66		MSO (ocean minesweeper) concept	
SCB 502		MSO modernization	
SCB 600		Asheville class PGM (former SCB 229)	
SCB 602		Pegasus class PHM	
SCB 700.66		Samuel Gompers class follow on: AD-39, cancelled (former SCB 244)	
SCB 701		AVB (aviation logistics support ship)	
SCB 702.65		L Y Spear class AS	
SCB 703.65		Kilauea class AE	
SCB 704		AGB (icebreaker)	
SCB 705		Mars class AFS (former SCB 208)	
SCB 706		Cimarron class AO jumbo conversion: Ashtabula sub-class	
SCB 707		Wichita class AOR	
SCB 708.65		Chauvenet class AGS	
SCB 709		Serrano AGS conversion (former SCB 214)	
SCB 710		Melville class AGOR	
SCB 711.65		Sacramento class AOE (former SCB 196)	,
SCB 713		Mission Buenaventura class AO jumbo conversion	
SCB 714		AS (submarine tender)	
SCB 719		Edenton class ATS	
SCB 720		Fast Deployment Logistic Ship FDL	
SCB 721		Pigeon class ASR	
SCB 723		Chauvenet AGS	
SCB 726		Hayes class AGOR (former SCB 226)	
SCB 728		Wyman AGS	
SCB 734		Gyre class AGOR	
SCB 737		Emory S Land class AS	
SCB 739		Cimarron class AO	
SCB 744		Powhatan class ATF	
SCB 800.65		YP-654 class	
SCB 900.65		Iowa class BB ASGL satellite launch concept	

== CIP ==
The SCB also had a list of projects called Class Improvement Projects. These were usually changes of a lesser scope or risk than SCB projects; many were contingency plans to refurbish reserve ships had it been necessary to reactivate them. No list of CIP numbers is available.

== See also ==
- List of ships of Russia by project number
- Military acquisition
- Naval architecture
- United States Navy bureau system
