= USS Requin =

US Navy diesel-electric submarine (1945–1968)

Coordinates: 40°26′42″N 80°01′07″W

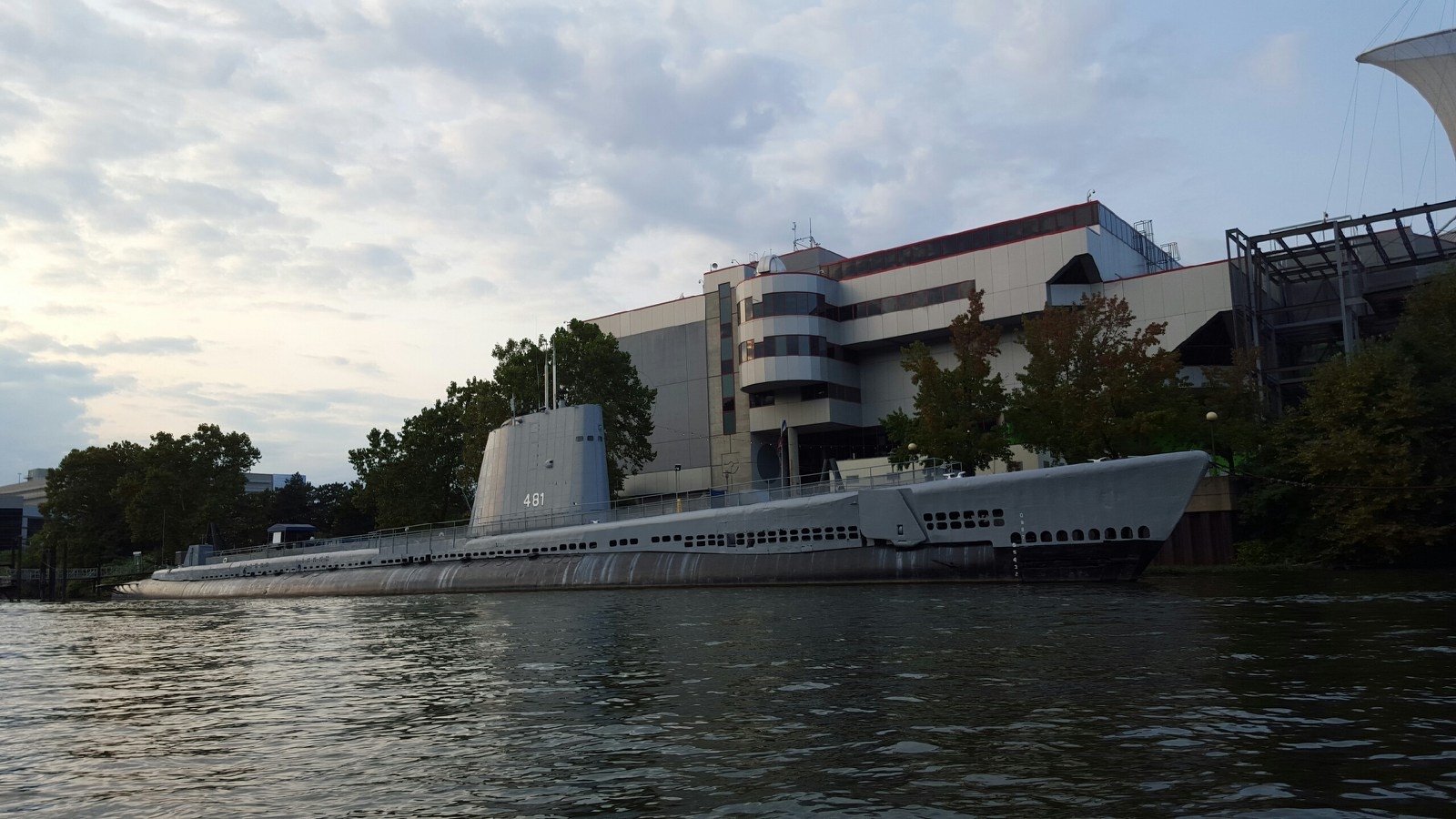
- Requin in dock on the Ohio River in Pittsburgh in 2017.

History

United States
- Name: USS Requin
- Namesake: French word for shark
- Builder: Portsmouth Naval Shipyard, Kittery, Maine
- Laid down: 24 August 1944
- Launched: 1 January 1945
- Commissioned: 28 April 1945
- Decommissioned: 2 December 1968
- Stricken: 20 December 1971
- Fate: Museum ship; Tampa 1972-1986; Pittsburgh 1990-present

General characteristics
- Class & type: Tench-class diesel-electric submarine
- Displacement: 1,570 tons (1,595 t) surfaced; 2,414 tons (2,453 t) submerged
- Length: 311 ft 9 in (95.02 m)
- Beam: 27 ft 4 in (8.33 m)
- Draft: 17 ft (5.2 m) maximum
- Propulsion: 4 × Fairbanks-Morse Model 38D8-⅛ 10-cylinder opposed piston diesel engines driving electrical generators; 2 × 126-cell Sargo batteries; 2 × low-speed direct-drive Elliott electric motors; two propellers; 5,400 shp (4.0 MW) surfaced; 2,740 shp (2.0 MW) submerged
- Speed: 20.25 knots (38 km/h) surfaced; 8.75 knots (16 km/h) submerged
- Range: 11,000 nautical miles (20,000 km) surfaced at 10 knots (19 km/h)
- Endurance: 48 hours at 2 knots (3.7 km/h) submerged; 75 days on patrol
- Test depth: 412 ft (130 m)
- Complement: 10 officers, 71 enlisted
- Armament: 10 × 21-inch (533 mm) torpedo tubes; (6 forward, 4 aft); 28 torpedoes; 1 × 5-inch (127 mm) / 25 caliber deck gun; Bofors 40 mm and Oerlikon 20 mm cannon

USS Requin (hull number SS/SSR/AGSS/IXSS-481) /ˈreɪkwɪn/, a Tench-class submarine, was the only ship of the United States Navy to be named after the requin, French for shark. Since 1990 she has been a museum ship at the Kamin Science Center in Pittsburgh, Pennsylvania.

== Construction and commissioning ==
Requin′s keel was laid down on 24 August 1944 by the Portsmouth Navy Yard in Kittery, Maine. She was launched on 1 January 1945, sponsored by Mrs. Slade D. Cutter, and commissioned on 28 April 1945 with Commander Slade D. Cutter in command.

Initially, Requin carried heavier armament than usual for a fleet submarine, perhaps because Commander Cutter was one of the most decorated submarine commanding officers going to sea. She had an additional 5-inch (127 mm)/25-caliber deck gun, as well as two 24-tube 5-inch (127 mm) rocket launchers, which were intended for use in bombarding Japan during Operation Downfall, the planned invasion of Kyūshū (Operation Olympic) and Honshū (Operation Coronet).

== Shakedown and first conversion ==
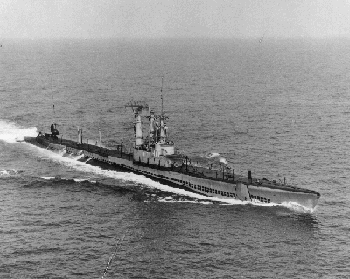
Requin circa 1946

Following shakedown off the New England coast, Requin departed Portsmouth on 3 June 1945 en route to Hawaii. She joined the Pacific Fleet on 13 July at Balboa, Panama, and at the end of the month reached Pearl Harbor. However, two weeks after her arrival, three days before she was to begin her first war patrol, World War II ended, and Requin was ordered back to the Atlantic.

Requin arrived at Staten Island, New York, on 18 September to begin what would be, in the words of Commander Cutter, "a dull and boring assignment," essentially becoming a target for sonar school ships. On 6 January 1946, she sailed for Key West, Florida, where she joined Submarine Squadron 4 (SubRon 4). August through November of that year was spent at the Portsmouth Naval Shipyard in Kittery, Maine, being converted to a radar picket submarine under project MIGRAINE. Her four stern torpedo tubes were removed, along with both of her deck guns and her aft anti-aircraft cannon. Two of her forward torpedo tubes were inactivated, and she was reduced to carrying only ten torpedoes. She also received a new skipper; in October 1946, Commander George L. Street III took command.

== Radar picket operations ==
After leaving the yard, she resumed operations in the western Atlantic and in the fall of 1947 moved north for exercises with her sister radar picket submarine Spinax (SS-489); on 13 November, she crossed the Arctic Circle. Given hull classification symbol SSR-481 on 20 January 1948, Requin began modification to the MIGRAINE II Radar Picket configuration at the Portsmouth Naval Shipyard in Kittery, Maine. In December, she departed the shipyard after completing trials with new radar equipment. She reported to New London, Connecticut for duty with Submarine Squadron 8.

In May 1949, she sailed east for her first deployment with the Sixth Fleet. Arriving at Gibraltar on 14 May, she operated in the Mediterranean Sea until 30 June. Soon after returning to New London, Requin was transferred to Norfolk, Virginia for duty with SubRon 6. Into the spring of 1950, she operated in the western Atlantic, ranging from Nova Scotia to the West Indies. Overhaul occupied most of the summer, and with the end of the year, she prepared for another Sixth Fleet tour. In the Mediterranean from mid-January to mid-May 1951, she resumed operations off the East Coast and in the Caribbean Sea on her return. In August 1952, she was back in European waters. During September, she visited the United Kingdom; then, in October, the submarine transited the Strait of Gibraltar for her regular Sixth Fleet duty.

In 1953, she maintained her schedule of Second and Sixth Fleet operations, but at the end of the year put into Philadelphia, Pennsylvania, for an extensive modernization overhaul that among other changes removed her last anti-aircraft cannon. On 2 May 1955, she sailed for her fifth Mediterranean deployment. Detached at the end of July, she returned to Norfolk. She remained on the East Coast, with cruises to the Caribbean, until November 1957, when she resumed duty with the Sixth Fleet.

== Second conversion ==
From June through August 1959, the Charleston Navy Yard in South Carolina removed all of Requin's radar equipment and improved her streamlining. Upon her conversion to Fleet Snorkel configuration, she was given hull classification symbol SS-481 on 15 August 1959, and rejoined SubRon 6 in Norfolk for operations as a normal attack submarine, a role she retained until her decommissioning.

Requin conducted local operations off the East Coast and in the Caribbean Sea. In the summer of 1961, Requin served as a target for Task Group Alpha led by USS Saratoga CVA 60. Requin conducted a periscope approach on Saratoga and launched a simulated torpedo attack. Then a helicopter dropped an exercise torpedo on Requin, which hit forward and made several re-attacks bouncing down the port side of the submarine. On 20 September 1963, Requin completed her 5000th dive. From 7 January 1964 into May, she operated with the Sixth Fleet, then resumed her Second Fleet duties into 1968, interrupted only twice for extended deployments. Operation UNITAS VII in the fall of 1966 called for Requin to cruise around the South American continent for exercises with various South American navies. Her last Sixth Fleet deployment sent her back to the Mediterranean for duty from 4 April to 27 July 1967.

Requin's last Mediterranean deployment began on 4 April 1967. On 8 June, just as she completed a series of exercises with the U.S. Sixth Fleet, she received word that the U.S. signals intelligence ship Liberty (AGTR-5) was under attack. Requin's crew prepared to go to the defense of Liberty, but received orders from the Sixth Fleet commander to surface and proceed to Crete.

On 28 May 1968, during her last deployment before decommissioning, Requin departed Norfolk, Virginia, as part of the search effort for the missing nuclear attack submarine Scorpion (SSN-589). On 29 June 1968, Requin was reclassified as an auxiliary submarine, AGSS-481, and in October 1968 she began inactivation at Naval Station Norfolk.

== Decommissioning and disposal ==
Decommissioned on 3 December 1968, Requin was towed to St. Petersburg, Florida in February 1969, and served there as a non-powered Naval Reserve training vessel for Naval Reserve Center St. Petersburg, adjacent to Albert Whitted Airport and Coast Guard Air Station St. Petersburg. On 30 June 1971 Requin was reclassified as a miscellaneous auxiliary submarine, IXSS-481, and on 20 December 1971 she was struck from the Naval Vessel Register.

== Preservation ==
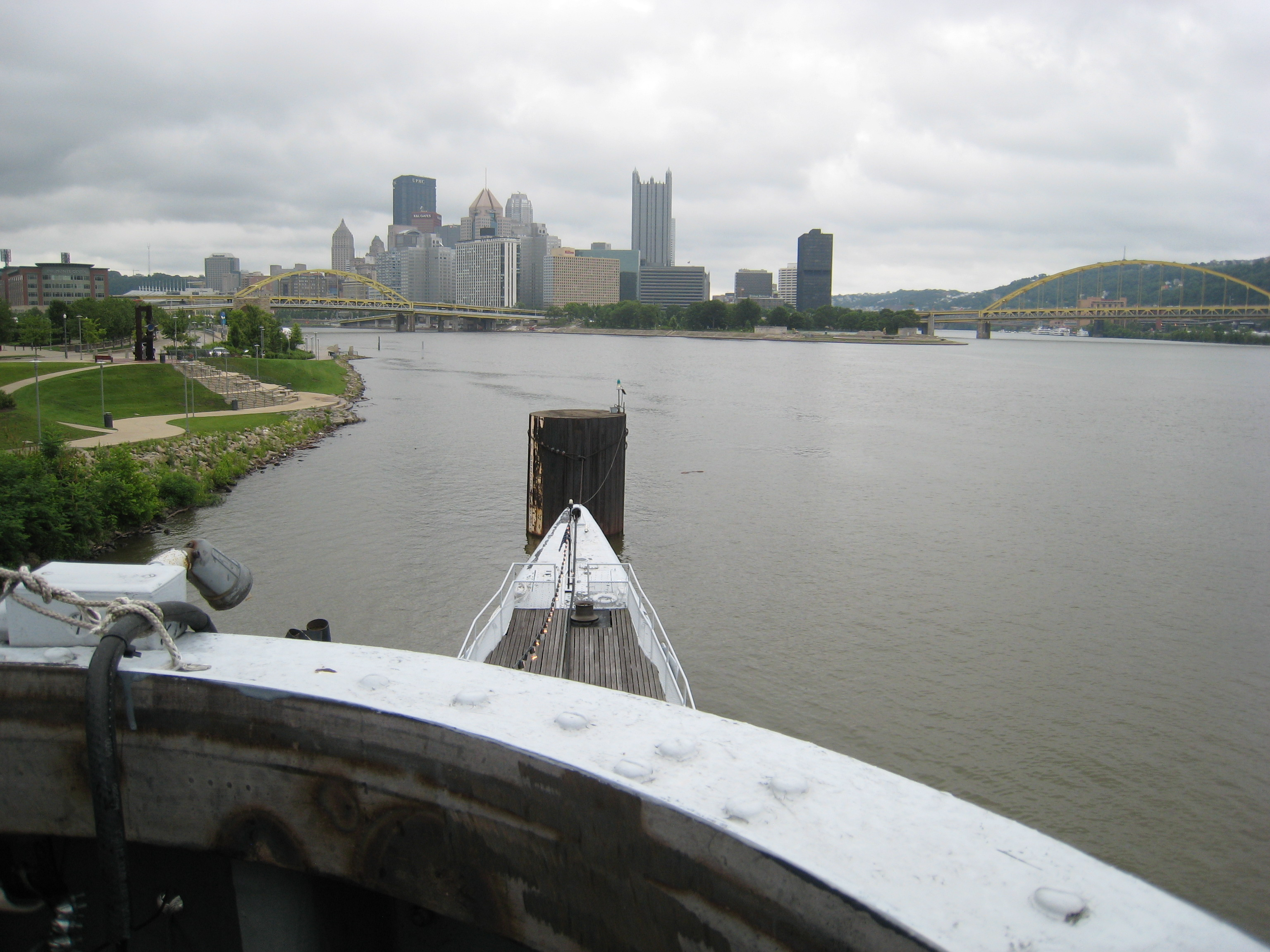
View of Pittsburgh from the sail of USS Requin

On 17 June 1972 Requin was transferred to a non-profit memorial foundation in Tampa, Florida, and docked in the Hillsborough River adjacent to Curtis Hixon Hall and the Tampa Museum of Art, across the river from the University of Tampa, as a tourist attraction. She remained in this role until 1986 when the non-profit organization responsible for the submarine folded due to insolvency and Requin was closed down due to lack of funding and support. Except for briefly reopening in 1988, she essentially remained abandoned at the pier for the subsequent four years.

On 21 February 1990, Senator John Heinz introduced Senate Bill S.2151, which allowed Requin to be transferred as an exhibit for the Kamin Science Center in Pittsburgh, Pennsylvania. On 24 May, Requin was towed to Tampa Shipyard for dry docking and hull repairs in preparation for her move to Pittsburgh. On 7 August, she left International Ship Repair in Tampa under tow to Baton Rouge, Louisiana where, on 11 August, she was lifted onto barges and began her ride up the Mississippi River and Ohio River to Pittsburgh. On 4 September, Requin arrived at the Carnegie Science Center. On 20 October 1990, Requin was dedicated as a memorial and museum exhibit and opened for tours.

== Awards ==
- Asiatic-Pacific Campaign Medal
- World War II Victory Medal
- Navy Occupation Medal with "Europe" clasp
- National Defense Service Medal with star

== Former crew ==
- Lyle Gramley, 1946–47

Robert Moore, 1967–68

== See also ==
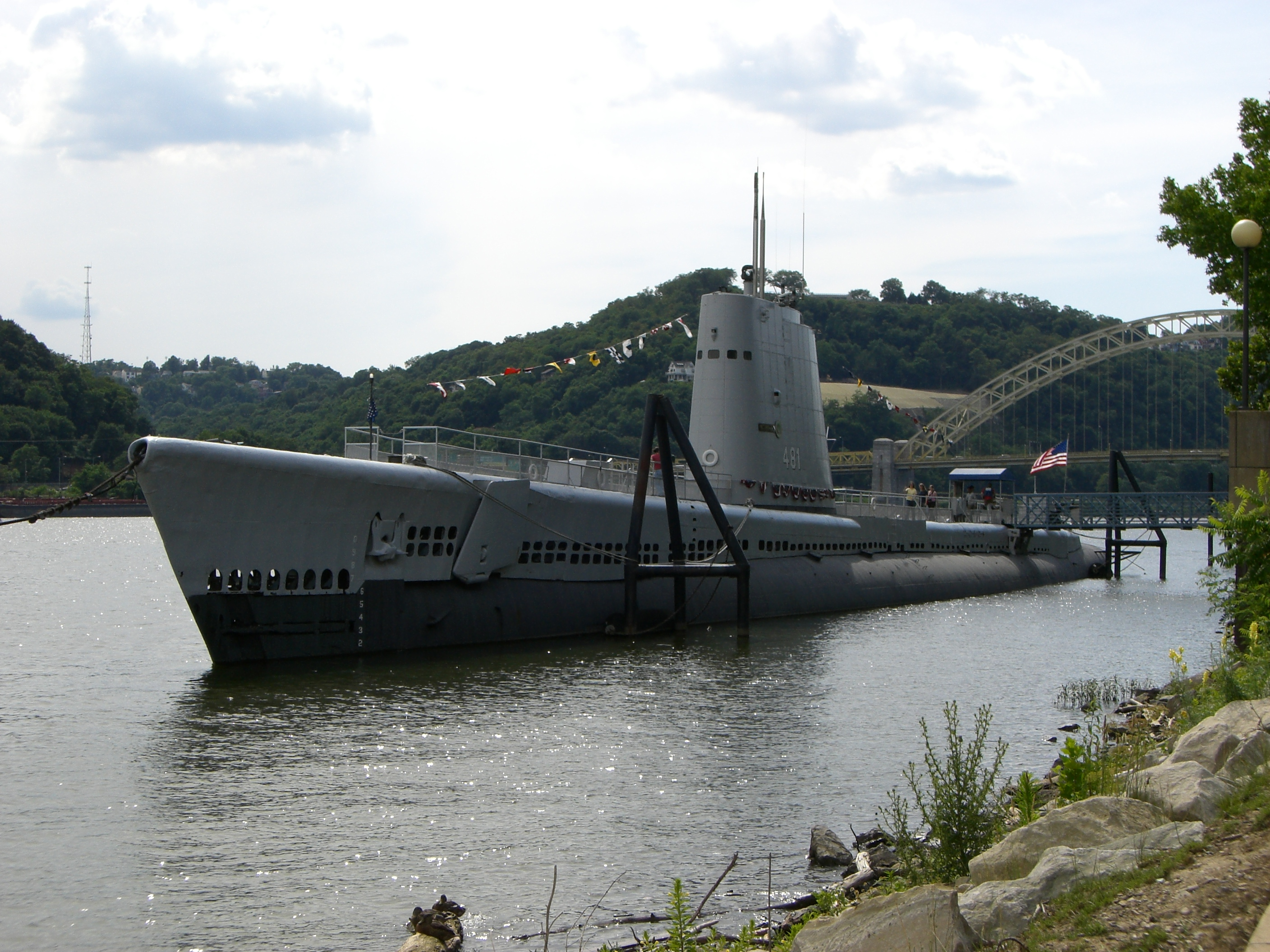
USS Requin (SS-481) as a museum ship.

- USS Torsk (SS-423)
