= Radar picket =

Station used to increase radar detection range

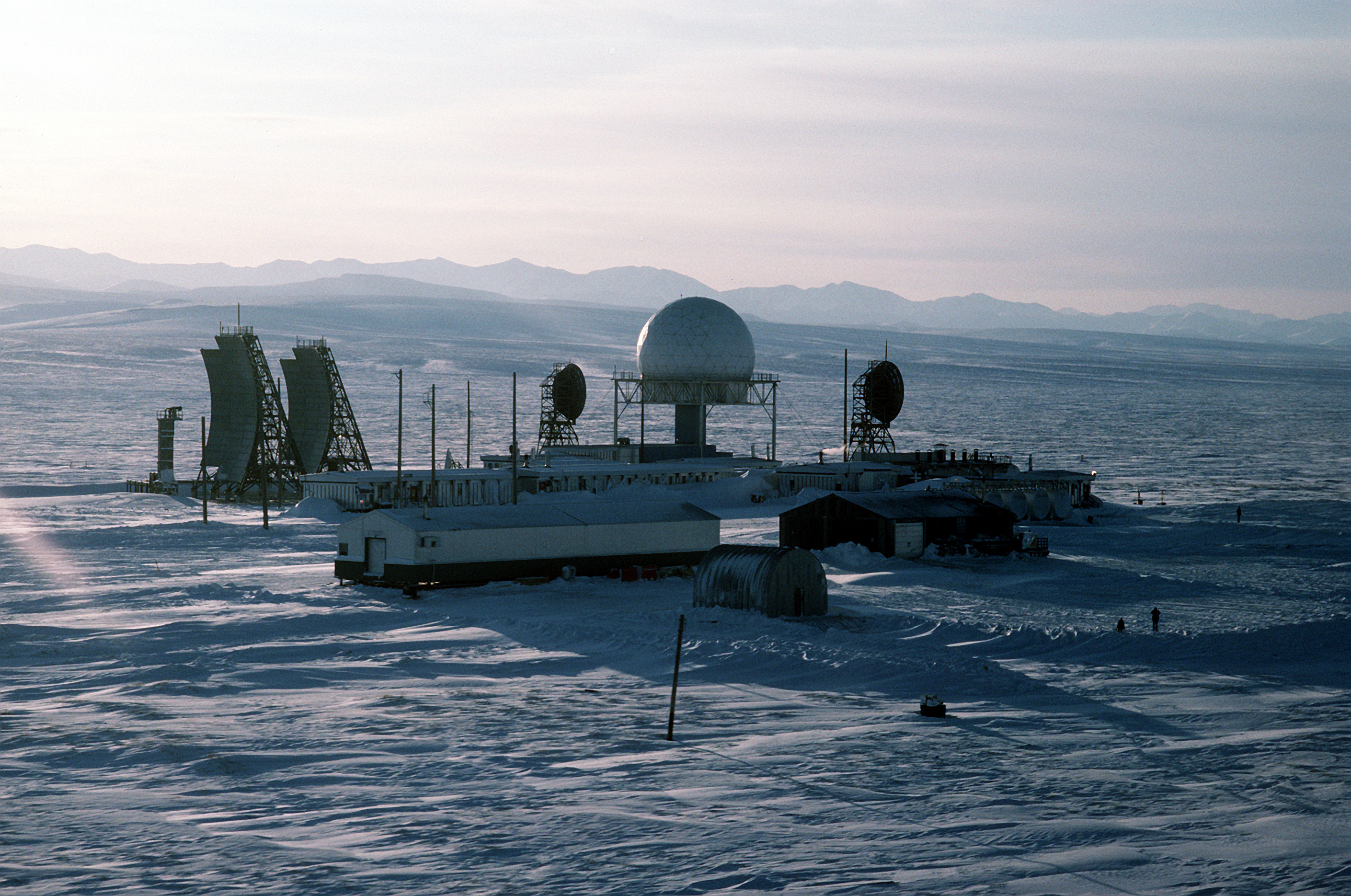
Former radar station at Point Lay, Alaska.

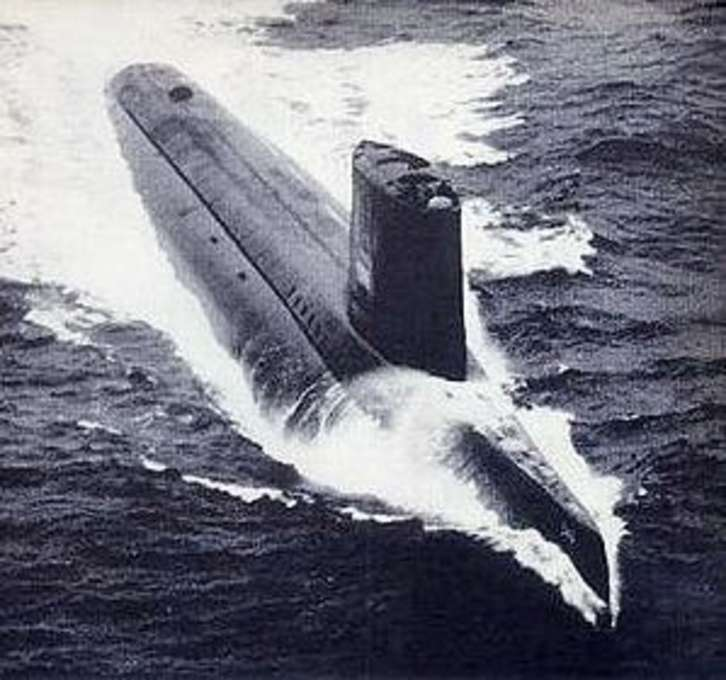
USS Triton (SSRN-586)

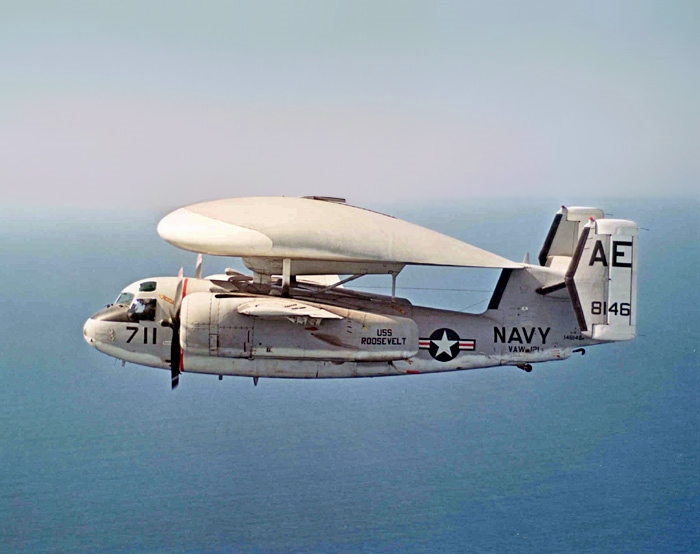
Grumman E-1 Tracer

A radar picket is a radar-equipped station, ship, submarine, aircraft, or vehicle used to increase the radar detection range around a nation or military (including naval) force to protect it from surprise attack, typically air attack, or from criminal activities such as smuggling. The term 'picket' is an old military term for a sentry placed forward of a defensive line, in order to provide an advanced warning. By definition a radar picket must be some distance removed from the anticipated targets to be capable of providing early warning. Often several detached radar units would be placed in a ring to encircle a target to provide increased cover in all directions; another approach is to position units to form a barrier line.

Radar picket units may also be equipped to direct friendly aircraft to intercept any possible enemy. In British terminology the radar picket function is called aircraft direction. A ship performing this function is termed a fighter direction ship. Airborne radar pickets are referred to as Airborne early warning and control (AEW&C) or simply airborne early warning (AEW), depending on capabilities.

In a sense radars intended to track ballistic missiles can be thought of as radar pickets (the early US Ballistic Missile Early Warning System (BMEWS) was originally termed as such), but because such systems also came to be used for tracking orbital satellites and space debris the current preferred term for them is space domain awareness systems.

== World War II ==
=== United Kingdom World War II radar pickets ===
==== UK coastal radar ====
Chain Home or CH was the codename for the ring of coastal early warning radar stations built by the Royal Air Force (RAF) before and during World War II to detect and track aircraft. Chain Home proved decisive during the Battle of Britain in 1940. The Chain Home network was continually expanded, with over 40 stations operational by the war's end. CH was not able to detect aircraft at low altitude, and from 1939 was normally partnered with the Chain Home Low system which could detect aircraft flying at any altitude over 500 ft (150 m). Ports were covered by Chain Home Extra Low, which gave cover down to 50 ft (15 m) but at shorter ranges of approximately 30 miles (50 km). In 1942 the AMES Type 7 radar began to assume the job of tracking of targets once detected, and CH moved entirely to the early warning role.

==== UK World War II AEW&C ====
In late 1944 the Fighter Interception Development Squadron carried out operational trials under Operation Vapour of a Vickers Wellington which was equipped with a modified ASV Mk VI radar set and PPI, as one of the first Airborne Early Warning and Control (AEW&C) aircraft. It operated at an altitude of 4,000 feet over the North Sea to control de Havilland Mosquito and Bristol Beaufighter night fighters intercepting Heinkel He 111 bombers flying from Dutch airbases and their V-1 flying bombs. The Wellington was fitted with a homing beacon so the night fighters could locate and keep station with it. Despite encouraging results, the operational trials ended after the Luftwaffe stopped air launches by mid January 1945.

=== German World War II radar pickets ===
==== Kammhuber Line ====
A map of part of the Kammhuber Line stolen by a Belgian agent and passed-on to the British in 1942. The 'belt' and nightfighter 'boxes' are shown

The Kammhuber Line was the Allied name given to the German night air defense system established in July 1940 by Colonel Josef Kammhuber. The first version of the Line consisted of a series of 'boxes' of radar stations with overlapping coverage, layered three deep from Denmark to the middle of France, each covering a zone about 32 km long (north-south) and 20 km wide (east-west). Each station consisted of a control center with a FuMG A1 Freya radar with a range of about 100 km and a directed searchlight for the night fighters. Later versions of the Line added two Würzburg-Riese radars, with a range of about 30 km. Unlike the early-warning Freya, Würzburgs were accurate (and complex) tracking radars. One Würzburg would lock onto the target as soon as the Freya picked it up, and the second Würzburg would lock onto the night fighter as soon as it entered the box, thereby allowing controllers to get continual readings of the positions of both planes.

The Line was very effective against early RAF Bomber Command tactics. However, on the night of 30/31 May 1942 in its 1,000 plane raid against Cologne, Bomber Command introduced the use of the bomber stream. The concentration of bombers through a few of the boxes resulted in the defenses being overwhelmed. In response, the Germans converted their ground radar into a radar network, which would follow the path of the British bombers, while a controller directed the night fighters into the stream. Measure and counter measure continued until October 1944, when German defenses were no longer able to respond to Germany's deteriorating situation.

==== Kriegsmarine ====
From 1943 Nazi Germany's Kriegsmarine operated 2 radar-equipped night fighter guide ships (Nachtjagdleitschiffe), including the NJL Togo. which was equipped with a Freya radar for early warning and a Würzburg-Riese gun laying radar, plus night fighter communications equipment. From October 1943, Togo cruised the Baltic Sea under the operational control of the Luftwaffe. In March 1944, after the three great Soviet bombing raids on Helsinki, she arrived in the Gulf of Finland to provide night fighter cover for Tallinn and Helsinki. The other one was the Kreta, ex-French Ile de Beauté, sunk in Sept.1943.

=== Japanese World War II radar pickets ===
The Imperial Japanese Navy briefly modified two Ha-101-class submarines (Ha-103 and Ha-105) as dedicated radar pickets in the first half of 1945, but reconverted them to an even more important role as tanker submarines in June of that year.

=== United States World War II radar pickets ===
==== US Navy ====
Radar picket ships first came into being in the US Navy during World War II to aid in the Allied advance to Japan. The number of radar pickets was increased significantly after the first major employment of kamikaze aircraft by the Japanese in the Battle of Leyte Gulf in October 1944. Fletcher-class and Allen M. Sumner-class destroyers with SGA and SC radars were pressed into picket service with few modifications at first – the Allen M. Sumners were the first destroyers to be designed with a combat information center (CIC), which made them ideal for this use. Later, additional radars and fighter direction equipment were fitted, along with more light anti-aircraft (AA) guns for self-defense, usually sacrificing torpedo tubes to make room for the new equipment, particularly the large SP height-finding radars of the era. Deploying some distance from the force to be protected along likely directions of attack, radar pickets were the nearest ships to the Japanese airfields. Thus, they were usually the first vessels seen by incoming waves of kamikazes, and were often heavily attacked.

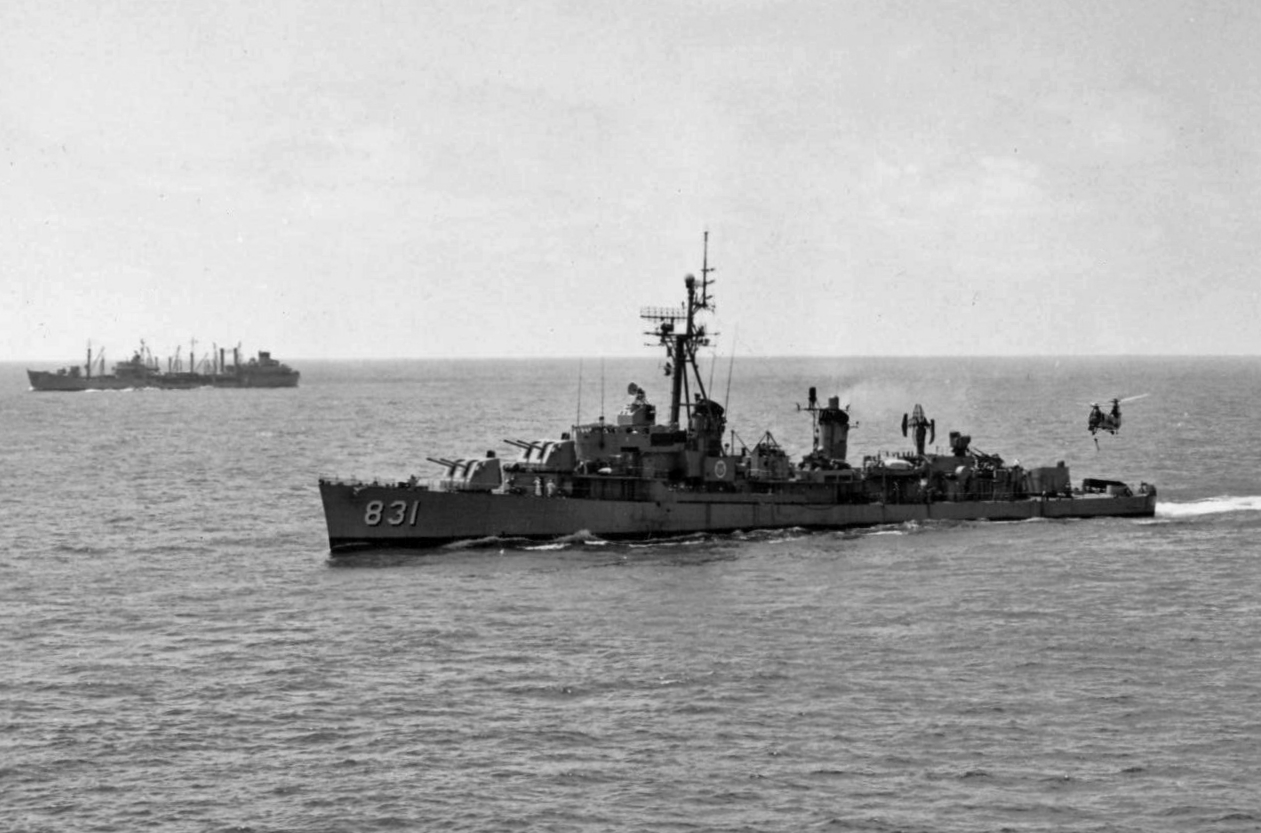
USS Goodrich (DDR-831) underway in 1950s radar picket configuration.

The radar picket system saw its ultimate development in World War II in the Battle of Okinawa. A ring of 15 radar picket stations was established around Okinawa to cover all possible approaches to the island and the attacking fleet. Initially, a typical picket station had one or two destroyers supported by two landing ships, usually landing craft support (large) (LCS(L)) or landing ship medium (rocket) (LSM(R)), for additional AA firepower. Eventually, the number of destroyers and supporting ships were doubled at the most threatened stations, and combat air patrols were provided as well. In early 1945, 26 new construction Gearing-class destroyers were ordered as radar pickets without torpedo tubes, to allow for extra radar and AA equipment, but only some of these were ready in time to serve off Okinawa. Seven destroyer escorts were also completed as radar pickets.

The radar picket mission was vital, but it was also costly to the ships performing it. Out of 101 destroyers assigned to radar picket stations, 10 were sunk and 32 were damaged by kamikaze attacks. The 88 LCS(L)s assigned to picket stations had two sunk and 11 damaged by kamikazes, while the 11 LSM(R)s had three sunk and two damaged.

The high casualties off Okinawa gave rise to the radar picket submarine, which had the option of diving when under attack. It was planned to employ converted radar picket submarines should the invasion of Japan become necessary. Two submarines (Grouper and Finback) received rudimentary conversions during the war with the new SR search radars and the SV search radars mounted vertically as height finders, and two others (Threadfin and Remora) were completed immediately after the war with the same suite, but none were used postwar in this role.

== Cold War ==
=== United States and Canada ===
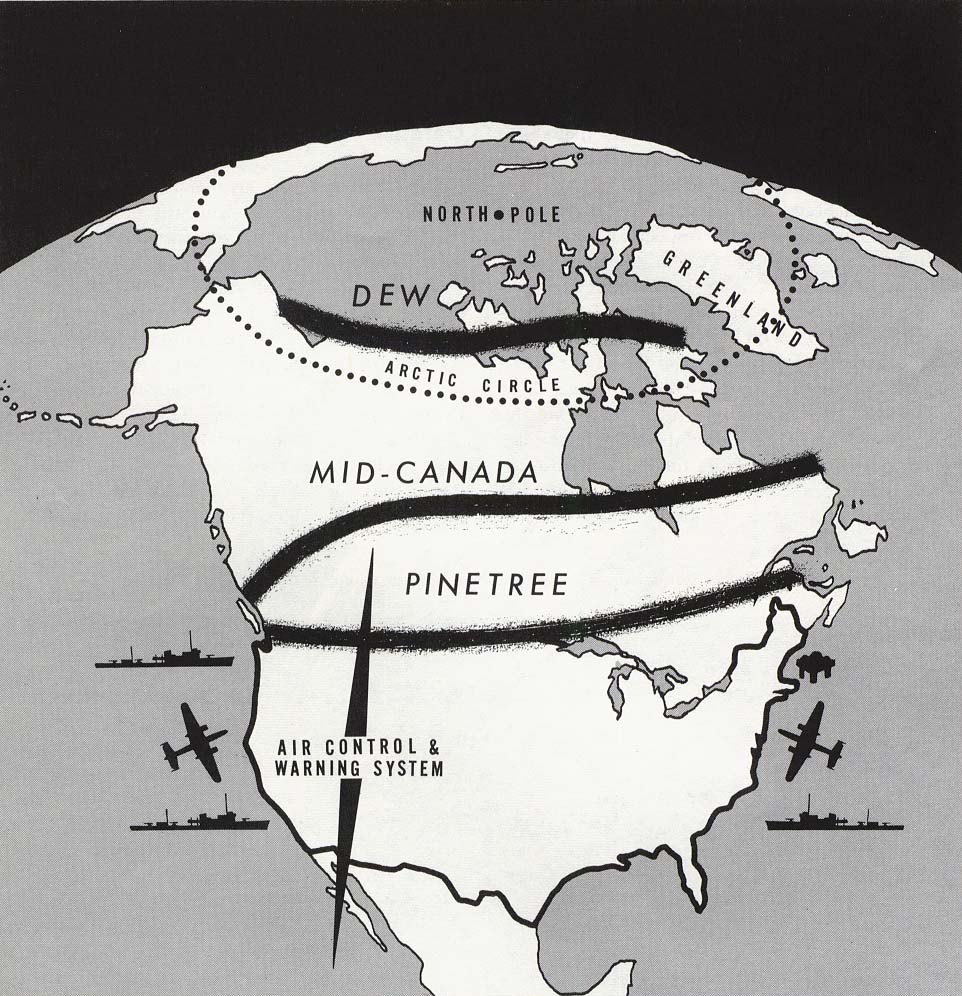
A rough map of the three warning lines. From north to south: the DEW Line, Mid-Canada Line, and Pinetree Line. Off the coasts are the aircraft and ships representing the ocean barrier lines, and a 'Texas Tower'.

During the Cold War, the Royal Canadian Air Force and the United States Air Force jointly built and operated radar picket stations to detect Soviet bombers, and the United States Navy expanded the naval radar picket concept. The wartime radar picket destroyers (DDR) were retained, and additional DDRs, destroyer escorts (DER), submarines (SSR, SSRN), and auxiliaries (YAGR, then AGR) were converted and built in the years 1946–1959. The naval concepts were: 1) every carrier group would have radar pickets deployed around it for early warning of the increasing threat of Soviet air-to-surface missile attack, and 2) radar pickets would form barriers off the North American coasts, thus extending the land based lines. While on station, all of these assets – other than those assigned to fleet defense – were operationally controlled by the Aerospace Defense Command and after May 1958 NORAD.

==== Fixed installations ====
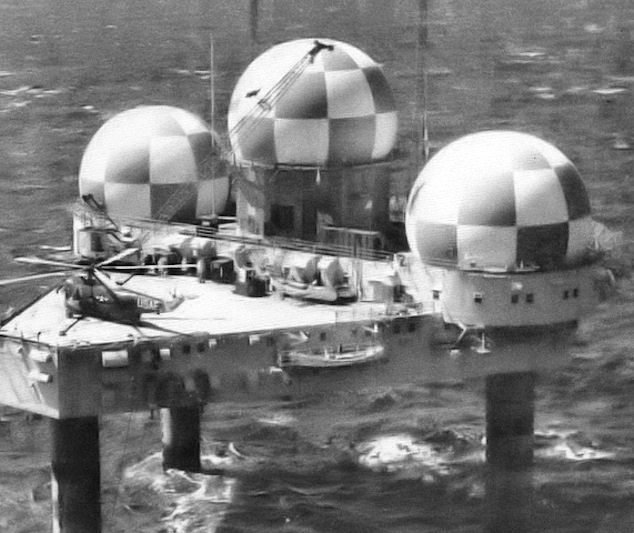
Texas Tower 3

During the 1950s the governments of Canada, Denmark, and the United States built three lines of fixed radar picket sites across Canada, and with the DEW Line into Alaska and Greenland. These were the Pinetree Line (1951), the Mid-Canada Line (1956), and the Distant Early Warning (DEW) Line (1957). The DEW Line would be equipped with AN/FPS-19, and until 1965 AN/FPS-23 radars. There was also a line of radar sites in Alaska extending westward from the end of the DEW Line to the end of the Aleutian Islands, and a line eastward from the Greenland end of the DEW Line to Iceland, the Faroe Islands, and Scotland.

There were also three oil-rig-type offshore radar stations known as "Texas Towers" off the New England coast with AN/FPS-3 (later AN/FPS-20) and AN/FPS-6 radars.

While not designed as pickets per se, coastal and interior fixed radars such as the interim Lashup Radar Network (1949), the Permanent System (1951), and Semi-Automatic Ground Environment (SAGE) (1958), would function as pickets for areas removed from suspected airborne attackers.

==== Command cruiser Northampton ====
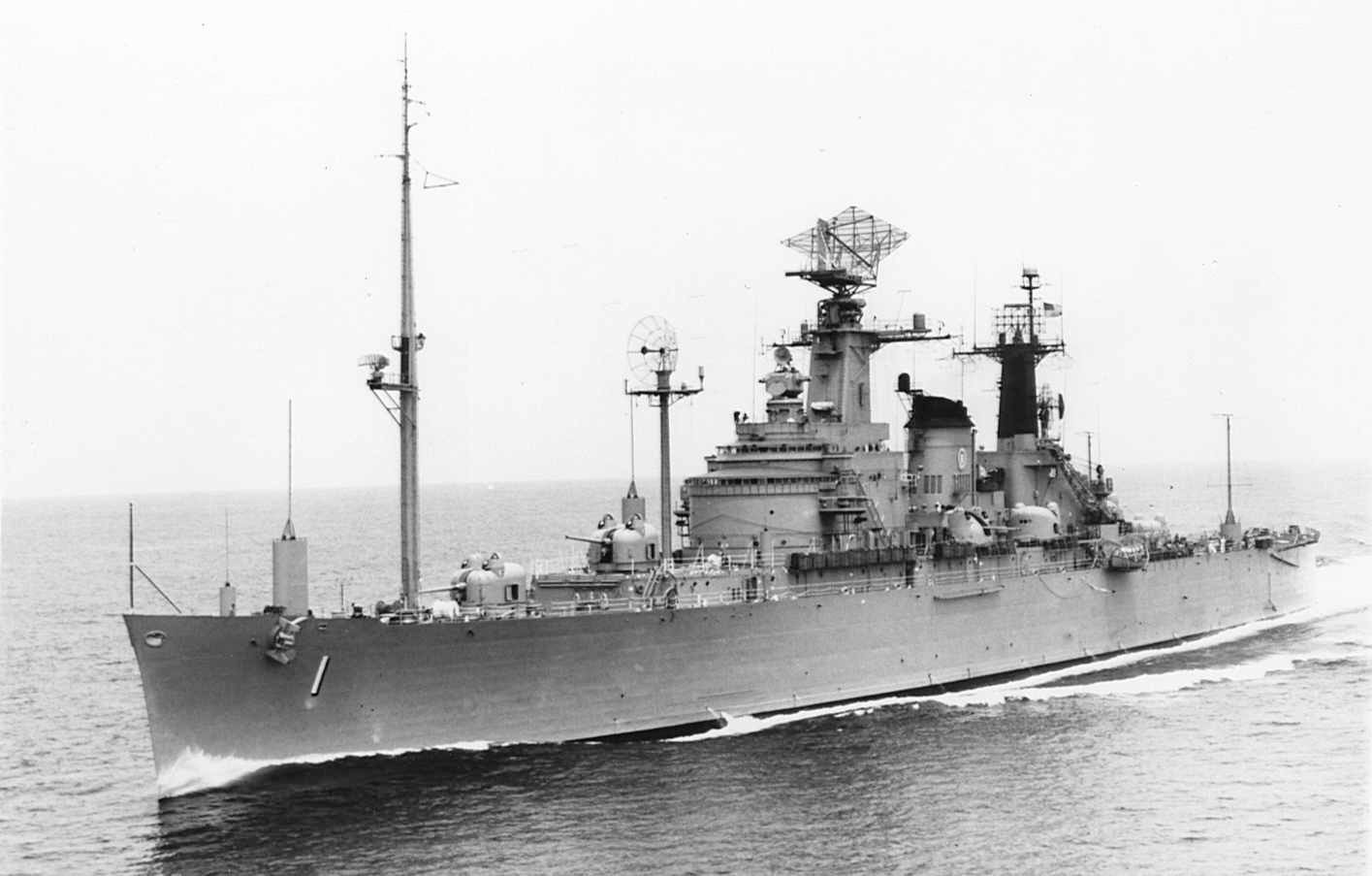
USS Northampton (CLC-1)

When the first supercarrier United States was being designed in 1946, it was thought she would not be able to have an island or masts for radar or other antennas. Therefore, it was decided that a command ship was needed to escort the carrier and act not only in part as a radar picket (although from the center of the task force rather than the periphery as a true picket would), but also as the radar director of aircraft approach and landing on the carrier. The unfinished heavy cruiser Northampton was converted under project SCB 13 into a command cruiser for this and other fleet command roles, with AN/SPS-2 (one of only two ships with this huge installation), AN/SPS-3, and AN/SPS-8 radars. The subsequent invention of the angled flight deck made it possible to install islands and radar on supercarriers, and so this role was eliminated from the Northampton conversion.

==== Converted and purpose-built submarines ====
The U.S. Navy continued to develop radar picket submarines (SSRs) after World War II under Project Migraine, and by 1953, a total of 10 new SSR conversions had been performed with SR-2 and SV-2 radars:

- Migraine I: in 1946 submarine radar picket conversions were performed on Spinax and Requin; these were more extensive than the rudimentary conversions made a year earlier for the planned invasion of Japan. The radar equipment of these diesel submarines took the place of torpedoes in the stern torpedo rooms. The radar antennas were mounted directly on the hull above the equipment, where they suffered spray damage.
- Migraine II (aka project SCB 12) involved raising the antennas off the hull onto masts, moving the equipment to the aft battery room (higher capacity GUPPY batteries were installed forward to compensate), and adding topside fathometers to give a limited under-ice capability. The aft torpedo tubes were removed and the compartment used for berthing and storage. Burrfish and Tigrone were converted, and the two Migraine I submarines were also upgraded to this standard.
- Migraine III (aka SCB 12A) had the most extensive conversion with an added 27.5-foot (8.4 m) compartment for an expanded CIC. The search antenna was moved to an enlarged sail located over the new compartment. Converted were Pompon, Rasher, Raton, Ray, Redfin, and Rock.

In 1956 two large, purpose-built diesel SSRs, the Sailfish class, were commissioned. These were designed under project SCB 84 for a high surface speed with the intent of scouting in advance of carrier groups, and were equipped with large BPS-2 and BPS-3 radars. However, the SSRs did not fare well in this mission. Their maximum surfaced speed of 21 knots was too slow to effectively operate with a carrier group, although it was sufficient for amphibious group operations.

It was thought that nuclear power would solve this problem. The largest, most capable, and most expensive radar picket submarine was the nuclear-powered USS Triton (SSRN-586), designed under project SCB 132 and commissioned in 1959 with the AN/SPS-26 radar (an electronically scanned radar fully adapted for submarine use and intended for Triton, BPS-10, was never completed). The longest submarine built by the United States until the Ohio class Trident missile submarines of the 1980s, Triton's two reactors - the only US submarine so powered - allowed her to exceed 30 knots on the surface.

==== List of radar picket submarines ====
- US Atlantic Fleet
  - USS Pompon (SSR-267)
  - USS Ray (SSR-271)
  - USS Redfin (SSR-272)
  - USS Burrfish (SSR-312)
  - USS Tigrone (SSR-419)
  - USS Requin (SSR-481)
  - USS Sailfish (SSR-572)
  - USS Triton (SSRN-586)
- US Pacific Fleet
  - USS Rasher (SSR-269)
  - USS Raton (SSR-270)
  - USS Rock (SSR-274)
  - USS Spinax (SSR-489)
  - USS Salmon (SSR-573)
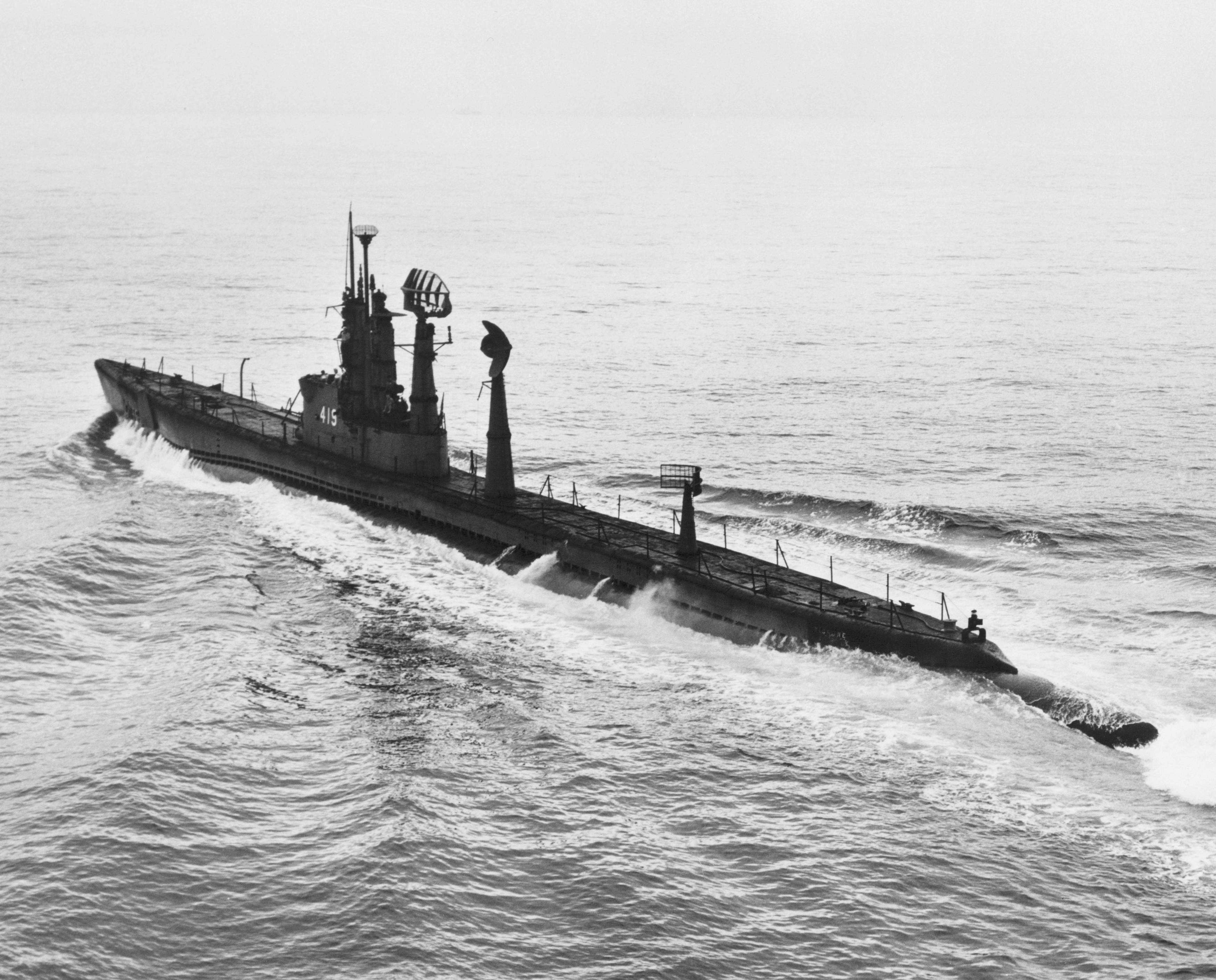
Atlantic Fleet's Tigrone in Migraine II radar picket configuration

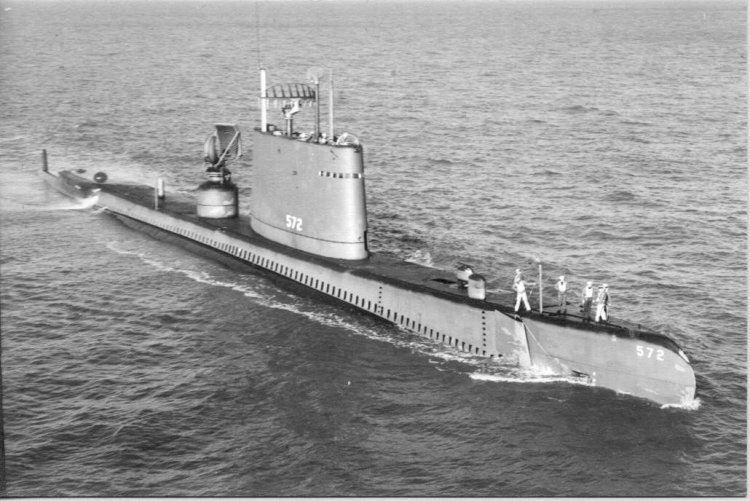
Atlantic Fleet's purpose-built Sailfish with BPS-2 and BPS-3 installations

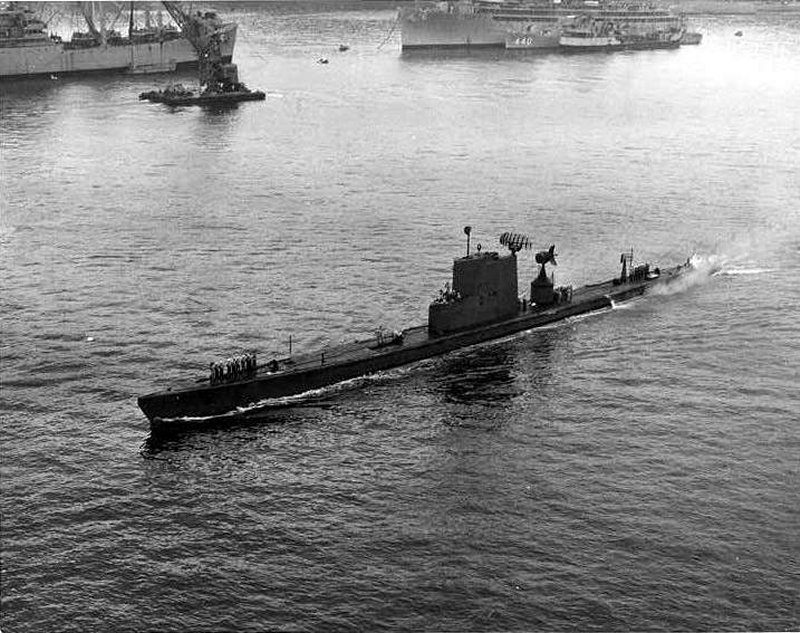
Pacific Fleet's Raton in Migraine III configuration

==== Destroyer escort conversions ====
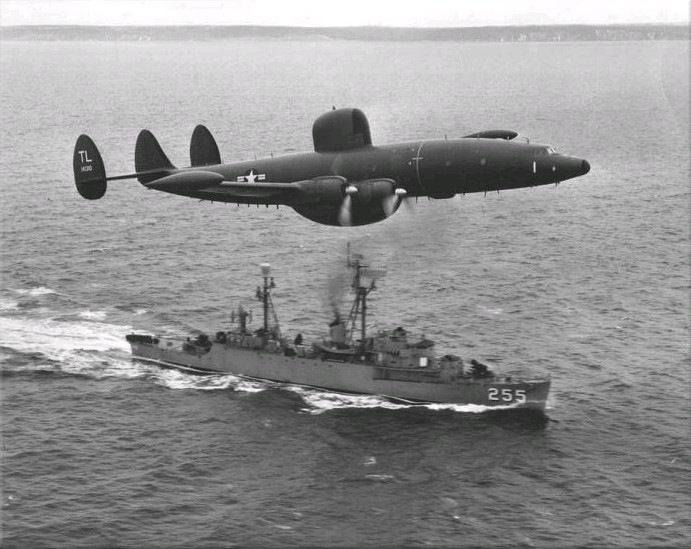
An Atlantic barrier Lockheed WV-2 Warning Star (later EC-121) and the radar picket destroyer escort USS Sellstrom (DER-255) off Newfoundland in 1957.

The 26 wartime Gearing-class DDRs were supplemented by nine additional conversions during the early 1950s. The seven wartime DERs were not considered worth modernizing and were relegated to secondary roles, so 36 additional DER conversions were performed in 1951 through 1958:

- Six diesel-powered Edsall-class DEs were converted into DERs in 1951 and 1952 under project SCB 46: converted were Fessenden, Harveson, Joyce, Kirkpatrick, Otterstetter, and Strickland.
- Two DEs which were unfinished at the end of World War II, Vandivier and Wagner, were completed as DERs in 1954 under SCB 46A. As John C. Butler-class DEs they had steam powerplants and so lacked the endurance of their diesel half sisters. This was an experiment intended to validate the conversion should the design be required for any future mobilization. These two ships would be the first DERs to be retired, in 1960.
- Another 28 Edsall-class DEs would be converted into DERs from 1954 through 1957 under SCB 46B.

The DERs were used in 1955–1965 to form two Barrier Forces known as BarLant and BarPac, which extended the DEW Line from Argentia, Newfoundland to the Azores in the Atlantic, and from Adak, Alaska to Midway in the Pacific.

==== Converted merchant ships ====
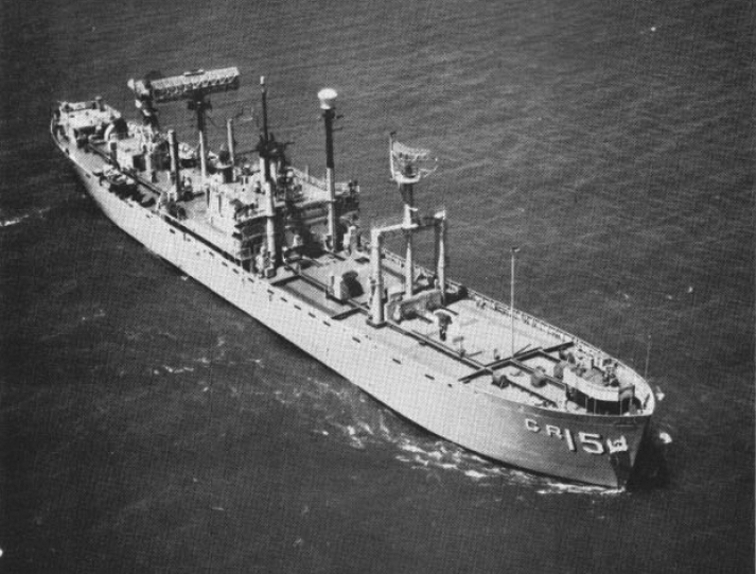
USS Tracer (AGR-15), an ocean radar picket ship

From 1955 to 1965 the United States Navy employed Guardian class radar picket ships (converted under project SCB 126 from the Z-EC2-S-C5 boxed aircraft transport version of the Liberty ship) to create barrier lines off the East and West Coasts. They were equipped with AN/SPS-8 (later AN/SPS-30 on some ships), AN/SPS-12, and AN/SPS-17 radars (the last was specially designed for these ships). Eight were homeported at Treasure Island, California and eight at Davisville, Rhode Island. The hull classification symbol of the ships was initially YAGR, changed to AGR in 1958 (this change moved the ships from the naval yard and district craft category to the naval auxiliary category). The standard crew consisted of 13 officers, 8 chief petty officers, and 125 enlisted.

Picket stations were about 400–500 miles (640–800 km) off each coast and provided an overlapping radar or electronic barrier against approaching aircraft. Typical station duty was about 30–45 days out and 15 days in port. While on station, each ship stayed within a specific radius of its assigned picket station, reporting and tracking all aircraft contacts. Each ship carried qualified air controllers to direct intercept aircraft sent out to engage contacts. While on station additional duties such as search and rescue, weather reporting, fishery studies, and other miscellaneous duties were assigned.

==== Replacement by aircraft ====
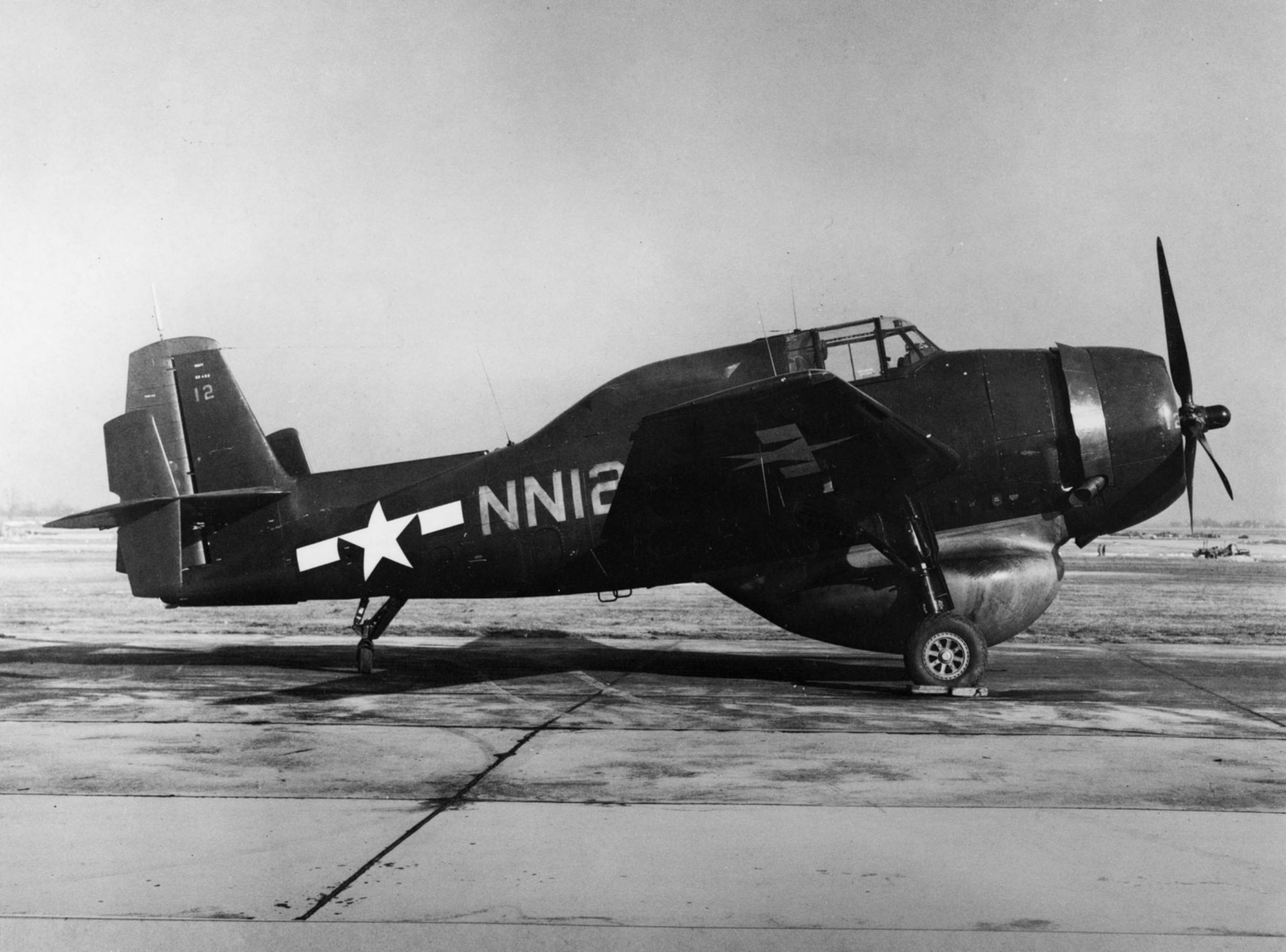
Grumman TBM-3W Avenger

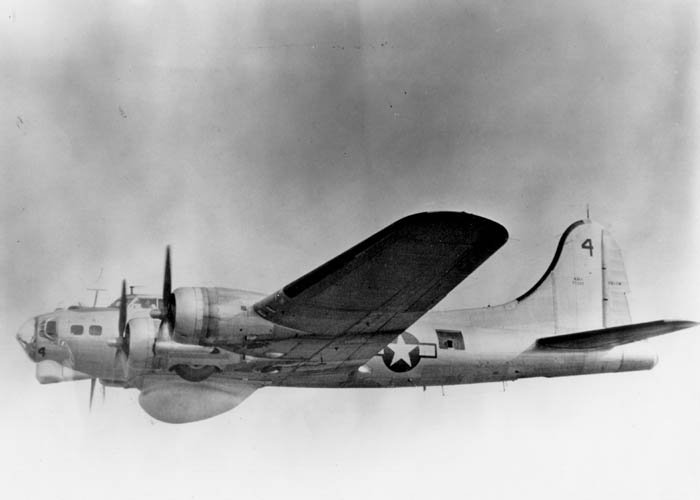
Boeing PB-1W

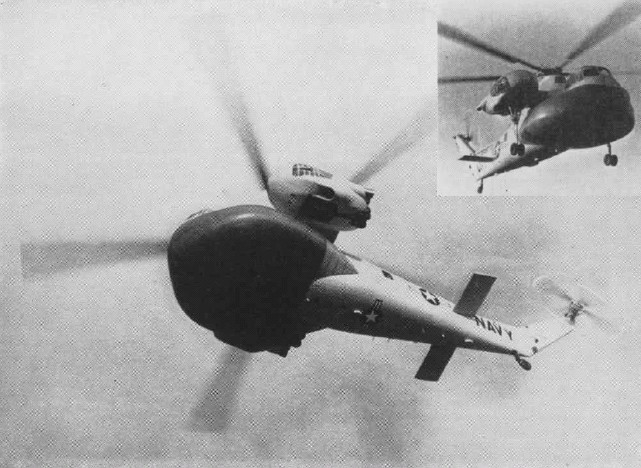
Sikorsky HR2S-1W early warning helicopter

The U.S. Navy began to develop airborne early warning (AEW) aircraft in the last years of World War II under Project Cadillac. The first U.S. AEW aircraft were the 1945 carrier based Grumman TBM-3W Avenger under Project Cadillac I, followed by the 1948 Douglas AD-3W, −4W, and −5W Skyraider and the 1950 Grumman AF-2W Guardian (not to be confused with the AGR ships of the same name); though the Skyraiders and Guardians were built in large numbers, none were very successful as they were too small to function as a full CIC, and all were used more often in the anti-submarine warfare (ASW) role. All of these aircraft used the AN/APS-20 radar. While the 1957 carrier-compatible Sikorsky HR2S-1W helicopter with the AN/APS-20E or AN/APS-32 radar (sources differ) had room for a full CIC it also failed, largely due to excessive vibration, slow speed, and cost.

Another 1945 development was the land based Boeing PB-1W, a naval B-17 variant modified under Project Cadillac II to carry the AN/APS-20 radar and a full CIC; this aircraft entered service too late for combat but was used for further development of the AEW concept.

Far more successful was the land based Lockheed EC-121 Warning Star, which was introduced in 1954 in both Air Force and Navy service as pickets and in other roles with the AN/APS-20 and AN/APS-45 radars, respectively under and atop the aircraft. As pickets the Air Force EC-121s provided radar coverage by flying "Contiguous Barrier" orbits 300 miles offshore, between the coasts and the AGR Guardian picket lines. The Navy version (designated PO-1W, then WV-1, −2, and −3 before 1962) flew over the more distant BarLant and BarPac DER lines. They would later be re-equipped with AN/APS-95 and AN/APS-103 radars. Their main deficiency was lack of endurance, which made them unsuitable for naval fleet coverage.

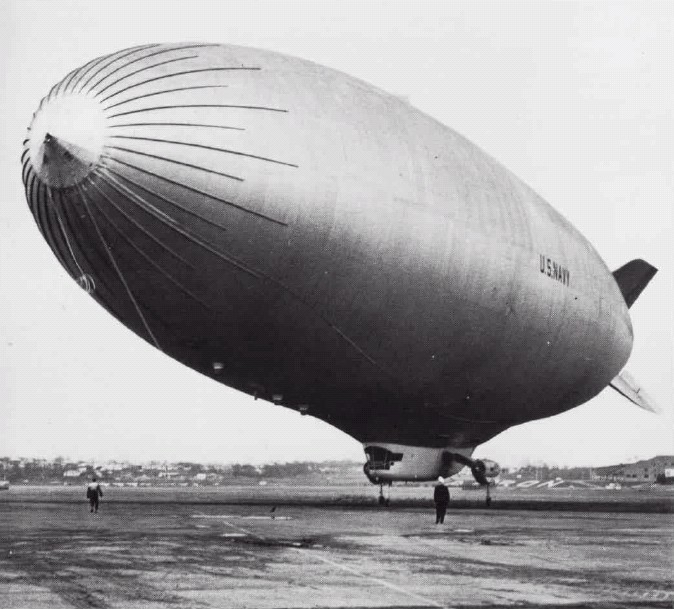
Goodyear ZPG-3W

Perhaps the most successful airborne radar pickets were the nine Goodyear ZPG-2W and ZPG-3W blimps: the −2W blimps were equipped with the AN/APS-20 and AN/APS-69 radars in an arrangement similar to the EC-121s, while the −3W blimps (the largest ever built) had the large AN/APS-70 radar placed inside their gas envelopes. Starting in 1955 they successfully combined airborne early warning radar surveillance and long endurance in all possible roles, but they were fragile, too slow to quickly reach stations far from base, and expensive (their overhead costs also increased after the ASW blimps were retired, having become technically obsolete due to the introduction of higher performance nuclear submarines). They were retired in 1962.

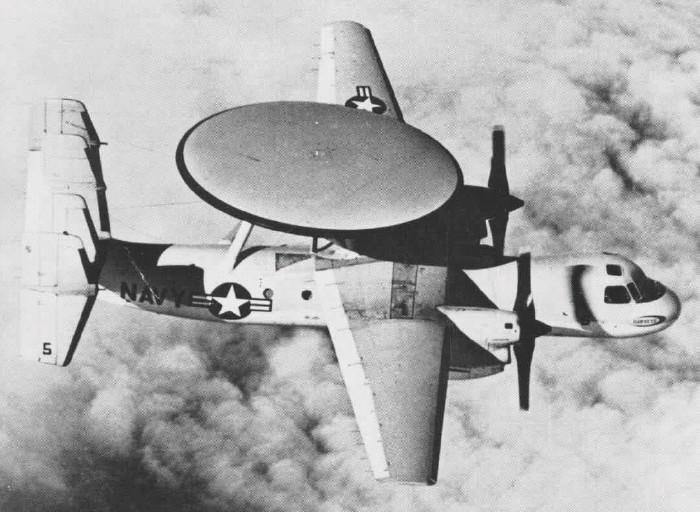
Grumman E-2A Hawkeye

The introduction of the Grumman WF-2 Tracer (later the E-1 Tracer) carrier-based airborne early warning aircraft in 1958 with the AN/APS-82 radar followed by the Grumman E-2 Hawkeye with the AN/APS-120 radar in 1964 doomed the surface and submarine radar pickets as carrier escorts (later E-2 models would see the APS-120 replaced in succession with the APS-125, -139, -145, and AN/APY-9 radar). Airborne radar had now evolved to the point where it could warn of an incoming attack more efficiently than a surface ship. In 1961 the DDRs and SSRs were withdrawn. All but six DDRs received ASW conversions under the FRAM I and FRAM II programs and were redesignated as DDs; the remaining six were somewhat modernized under FRAM II and retained in the DDR role. The SSRs were converted to other roles (the Sailfish class was converted to an attack submarine design under project SCB 242), or scrapped. Triton was left without a mission. She was too large to function as an attack submarine; some alternatives were considered, including serving as an underwater national command post, but she eventually became the first US nuclear submarine to be decommissioned, in 1969.

==== Replacement by OTH radar ====
By 1965, the development of over-the-horizon radar (OTH) made the barrier forces obsolete, and the DERs and the AGR Guardians were retired. The EC-121s would be allocated to other roles. OTH radar also played a small part in the retirement of the obsolete Pinetree Line, Mid-Canada Line, and the AN/FPS-23 radars of the DEW Line.

==== PIRAZ during Vietnam ====
The final use of the radar picket concept by the US Navy was in the Vietnam War. The Gulf of Tonkin Positive Identification Radar Advisory Zone (PIRAZ) guided missile cruisers (and destroyer leaders aka frigates which would later be redesignated as cruisers in 1975) provided significant air control and air defense in that war.

=== United Kingdom ===
==== British coastal radar ====
In the 1950s the Chain Home sites were either retired or converted into the ROTOR network, and then into the Linesman/Mediator network starting in the mid-1960s.

==== British aircraft direction ships ====
The British Royal Navy constructed or converted two types of dedicated aircraft direction ships in the late 1950s and early 1960s. Four World War II Battle-class destroyers and four Weapon-class destroyers were converted 1959–1962 as Fast Air Detection Escorts to accompany fast carrier groups. Also, four Type 61 Salisbury-class frigates were commissioned 1957–1960 to accompany slow carrier or amphibious groups. However, the aircraft direction function was short-lived. With the mid-1960s decision to phase out the fast carriers, the Battle-class ships were placed in reserve 1966–1968 and were scrapped or converted to non-combat roles by 1974. The Salisbury class were relegated to non-combat roles or sold by the end of 1978.

During the Falklands War the Royal Navy suffered from the lack of airborne early warning and used Type 42 destroyers as long-range radar and medium-high altitude missile pickets far from the British carriers.

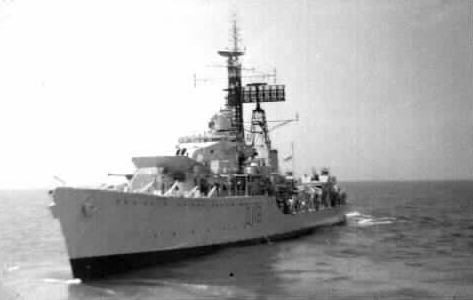
HMS Battleaxe (D118), a Weapon-class destroyer, after aircraft direction conversion

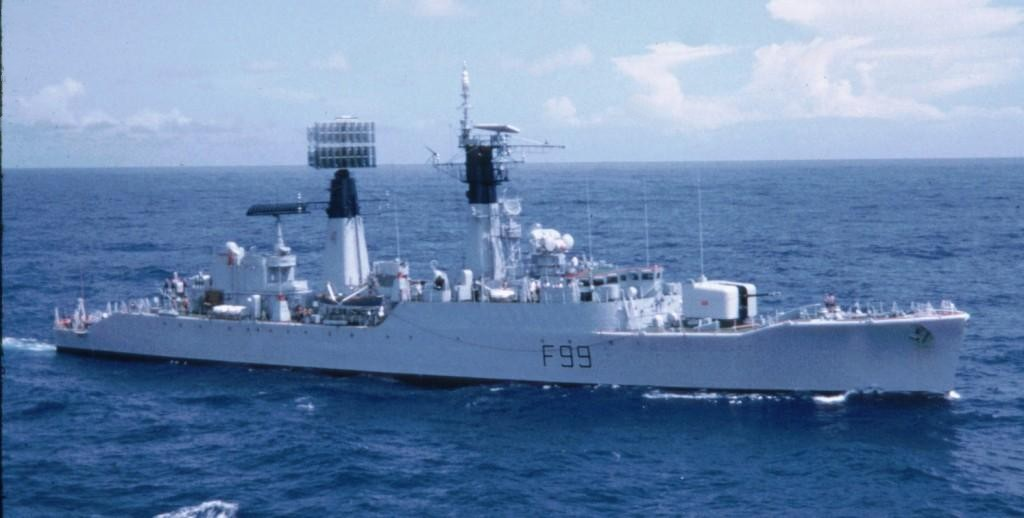
HMS Lincoln (F99), a Salisbury-class frigate, in 1972

==== British AEW ====
The Royal Navy began to operate the AEW version of the Douglas Skyraider in 1951. A more capable aircraft was desired, and the Fairey Gannet AEW.3 was the winner of a competition to replace the Skyraiders. Using the same AN/APS-20 radar as the Skyraiders, the Gannets entered service in 1960 and remained until the last full deck carrier was retired in 1978.

In anticipation of the retirement of the Gannets, in 1972 the RAF converted 12 Avro Shackleton maritime patrol aircraft to an AEW configuration by adding the AN/APS-20 radar to the underside of the aircraft; the last of these were retired in 1991.

=== Soviet Union ===
==== Soviet radar picket ships ====
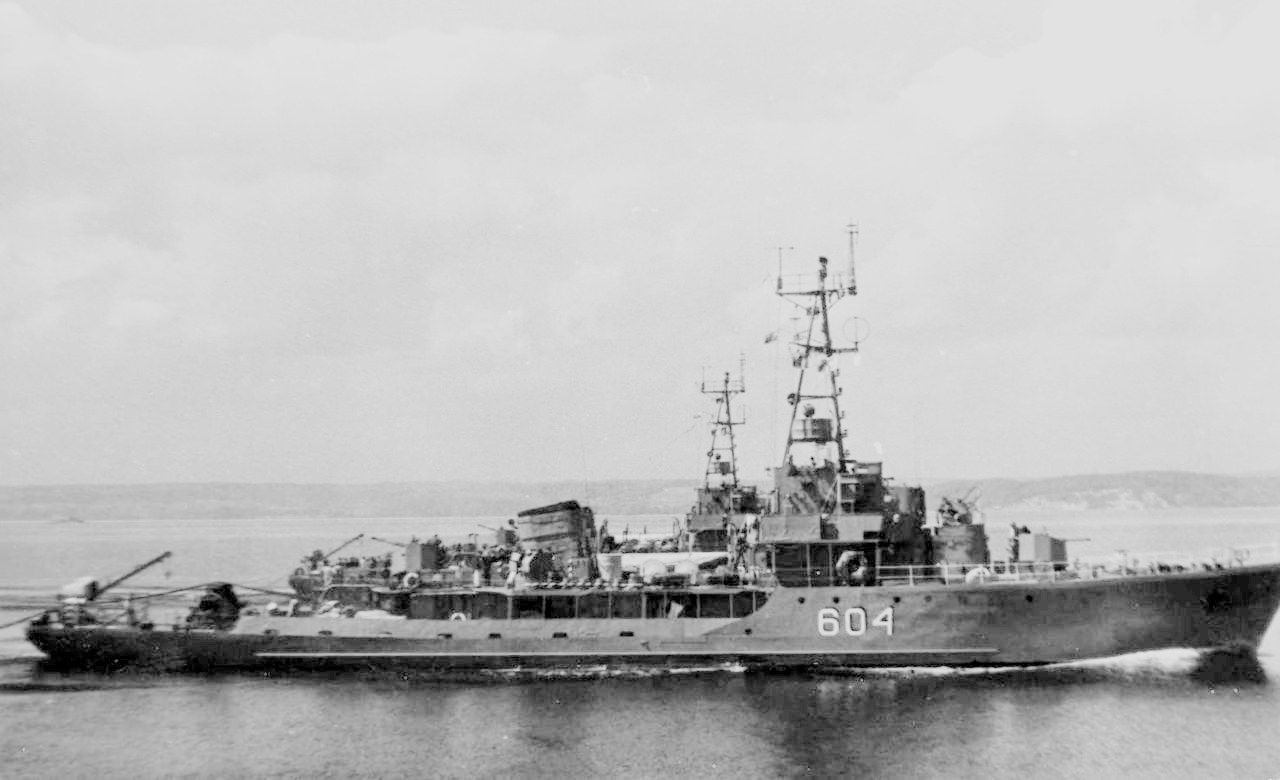
ORP Dzik, a Polish Navy T-43 class minesweeper (official image caption reads 'projektu 254M' but the aft turret has not been removed for the radar)

Twenty T43-class minesweepers were converted to Project 254 KVN-50-class radar picket ships between 1955 and 1959. Modifications involved replacing the aft gun turret with a Pegmantit 8 (NATO reporting name: "Knife Rest-A") or MP-500 radar (NATO: "Big Net") radar. Most were retired during the 1970s or relegated to training duties, with the last withdrawn in 1987.

Fourteen further T43-class minesweepers were converted to Project 258 KVN-6-class radar picket ships between 1973 and 1977 with Kaktus radars. Some were later modified to Project 258M ships with Rubka (NATO: "Strut Curve") radars.

Three T58-class minesweepers were converted to radar picket ships between 1975 and 1977 by replacing the aft 57 mm gun turret with a Pegmantit 10 (NATO: "Knife Rest-B") radar.

Three other projects were cancelled before conversions were made.

- Project 959: Further conversions the T58-class minesweeper with upgraded radar
- Project 962: A fourth cruiser type following on from the Kresta I, Kresta II and Kara designs
- Project 996: Conversion of a Sovremennyy-class destroyer

==== Soviet radar picket submarines ====
Four Project 640 submarines were converted as radar picket boats between 1959 and 1963 by fitting Project 613 submarines with "Boat Sail" radar in an enlarged conning tower. These were known to NATO as "Whiskey Canvas Bag" submarines from the canvas coverings often put over the radar when NATO aircraft approached. While the US radar picket submarines were intended for fleet defense, the Project 640 boats were intended to provide warning of air attacks on Soviet coastal territory.

==== Soviet AEW ====
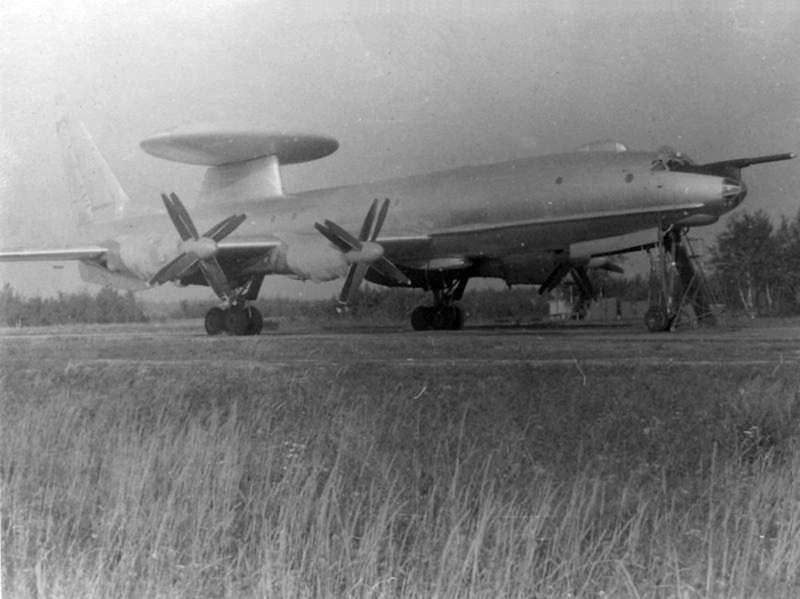
Tupolev Tu-126

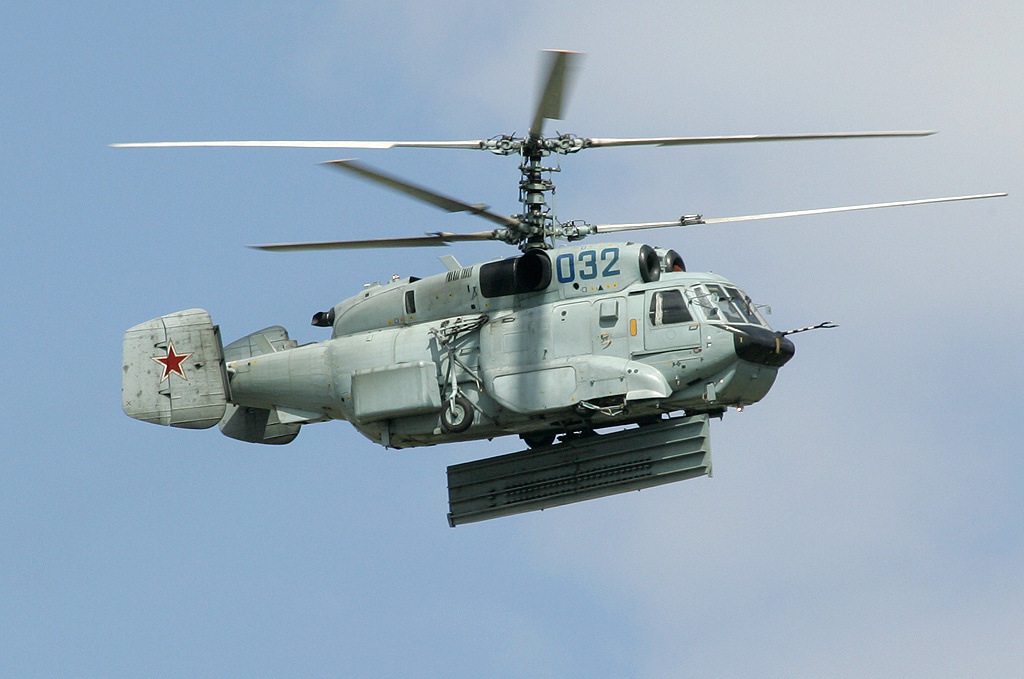
Kamov Ka-31

In 1958 the Soviet Union began development of an aircraft intended to act as an airborne early warning (AEW) radar picket in the far north along the Arctic coast, so that the expense of land stations could be avoided. The result, the Tupolev Tu-126 (NATO: "Moss"), entered service in 1965, but the Liana (NATO: "Flat Jack") radar was ineffective in tracking low flying targets over land, and suffered from reflections from the aircraft's propellers.

The Beriev A-50 "Mainstay" replaced the Tu-126. It first flew in 1978.

In 1979 the development of the Yakovlev Yak-44 was begun; this aircraft would have performed the AEW role aboard later Soviet aircraft carriers. It was similar in layout to the Grumman E-2 Hawkeye, and it would have carried a NPO Vega pulse-doppler radar in a rotodome. The project was cancelled in 1993. At the same time the Soviets began development of the Kamov Ka-31, a AEW helicopter for smaller ships, which would be exported after the collapse of the Soviet Union.

== Late and post-Cold War ==
=== Post-1980 fixed installations ===
In North America SAGE was replaced with the Joint Surveillance System in 1980–1983, and the DEW line was replaced with the North Warning System in 1988–1993..

In Britain the Linesman/Mediator network would be replaced with the Improved United Kingdom Air Defence Ground Environment in the 1990s.

=== Airborne early warning and control systems ===
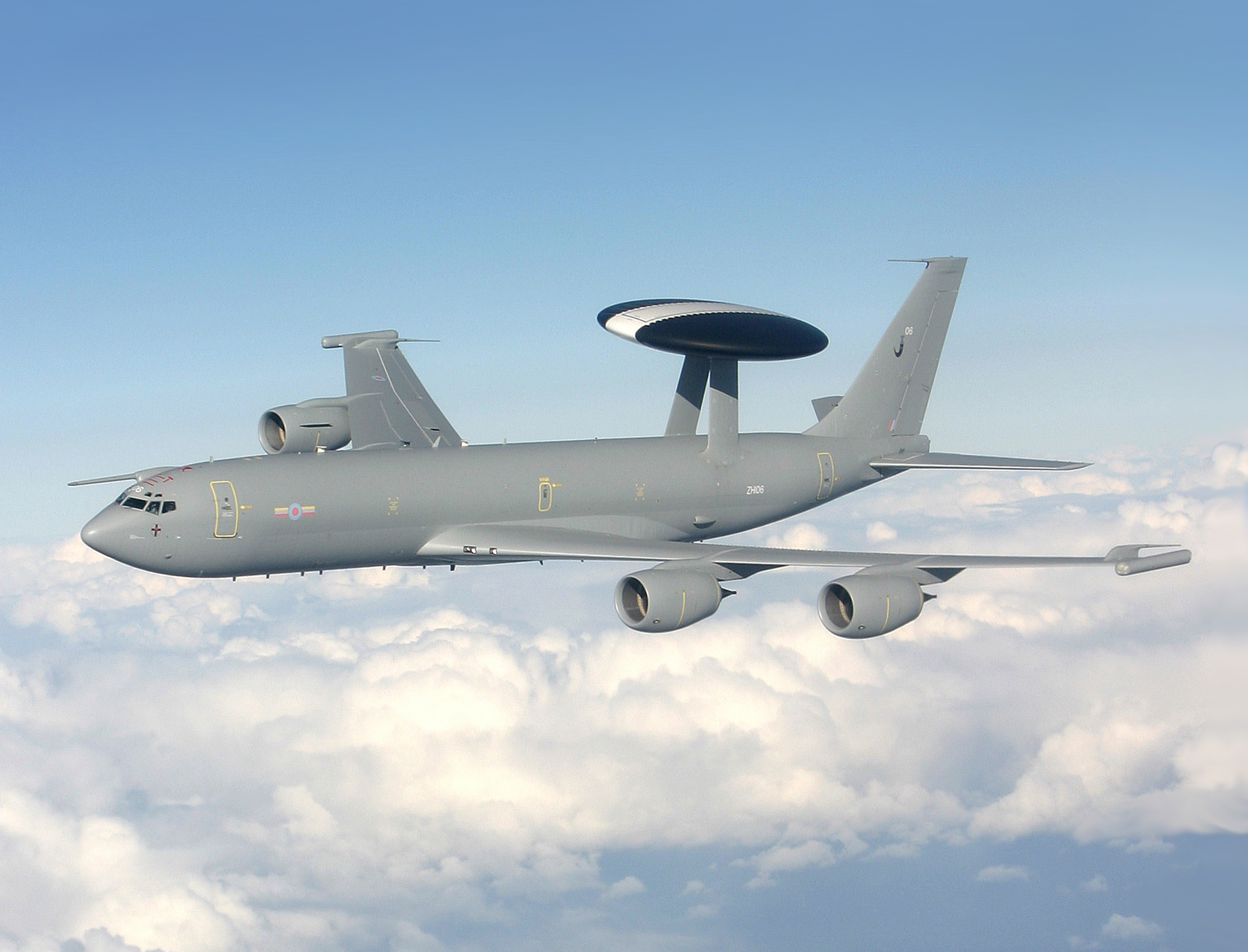
A RAF E-3 Sentry.

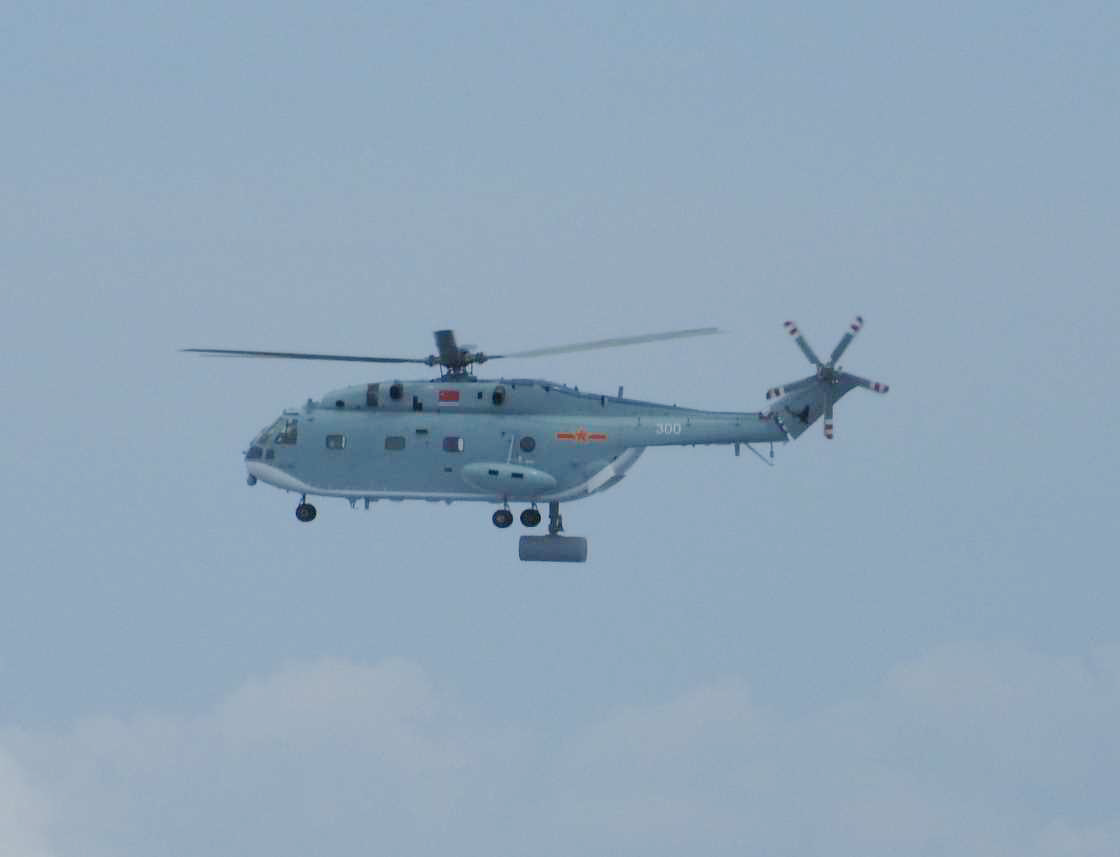
PLANAF Changhe Z-18J.

Airborne early warning and control systems (AEW&C, aka AWACS in the U.S.) were developed to replace the AEW radar pickets of the 1960s. These aircraft have capabilities far beyond their predecessors. They can perform complex command and control of a battlespace in air engagements by directing fighter and attack aircraft strikes. AEW&C units are also used to carry out surveillance, including over ground targets and frequently perform BMC2 (battle management command and control) functions. They are still capable of performing radar picket duties, though they are seldom used in this role.

China is developing the Z-18J AEW variant of the Changhe Z-18 medium lift helicopter, with a lowerable radar antenna in place of the ramp. The radar has a range of 320 km. China is also developing the Xi'an KJ-600 carrier borne AEW&C; first flight was on 29 August 2020.

=== Tethered aerostats ===
Tethered Aerostat Radar System

Beginning in 1980 the United States installed a barrier line of tethered aerostats to detect low flying aircraft over Cuba and the U.S.-Mexican border, known as the Tethered Aerostat Radar System.

Israel developed a similar system, the EL/M-2083, which it sold to India and Singapore.

A similar system, JLENS, was developed starting in 1998 by the United States for tracking cruise missiles and other threats, but was cancelled in 2017.

=== Long endurance unmanned aerial vehicles (UAVs) ===
Proposals have been made to install similar radars on long-endurance UAVs, although there are conflicts between radar power requirements and UAV endurance.

=== Uncrewed naval systems (USVs) ===
The British Government's 2026 Defence Investment Plan (DIP) proposes the introduction of a series of autonomous vessels or USVs for the Royal Navy including the Type 94 "Uncrewed sense platform". The USV was envisaged as functioning as a Radar Picket "to scan the skies for threats to the hybrid navy or the homeland". The numbers of vessels, and the timing of their introduction into service, had yet to be announced.

== See also ==
- Early-warning radar
- List of radars
- List of auxiliaries of the United States Navy § Radar Picket Ships (AGR)
- List of yard and district craft of the United States Navy § Radar Picket Ships (YAGR)
- Picket (military)
- Picket boat
- United States general surveillance radar stations
