= USS Wagner =

John C. Butler-class destroyer escort of the United States Navy

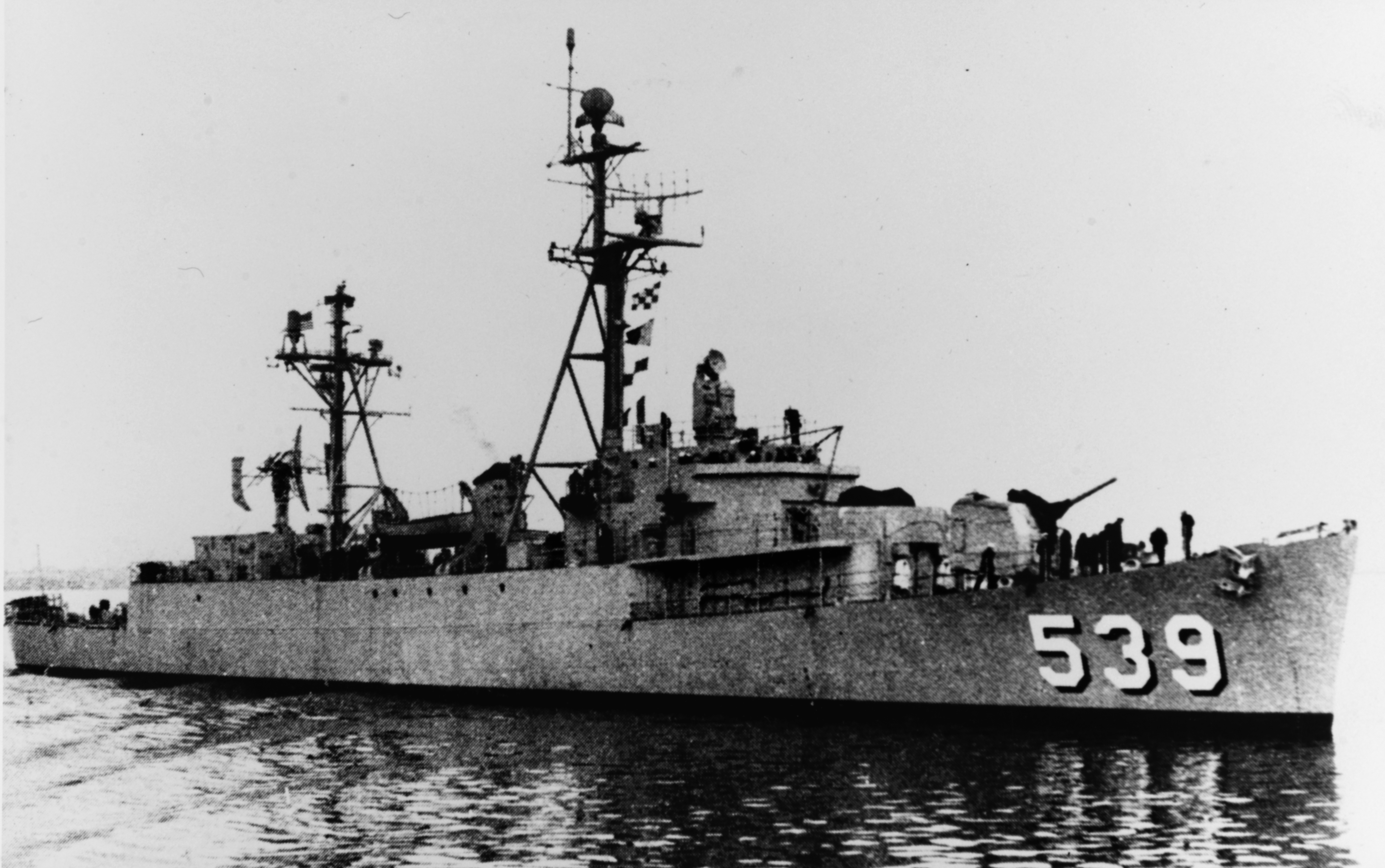

History

United States
- Laid down: 8 November 1943
- Launched: 27 December 1943
- Commissioned: 22 November 1955
- Decommissioned: March 1960
- Stricken: 1 November 1974
- Fate: Sunk as a target

General characteristics
- Displacement: 1,350 long tons (1,372 t)
- Length: 306 ft (93 m) (oa)
- Beam: 36 ft 10 in (11.23 m)
- Draft: 13 ft 4 in (4.06 m) (max)
- Propulsion: 2 boilers, 2 geared steam turbines, 12,000 shp, 2 screws
- Speed: 24 knots
- Range: 6,000 nmi at 12 knots
- Complement: 14 officers, 201 enlisted
- Armament: 2 × 5"/38 guns, 4 (2×2) 40 mm anti-aircraft (AA) guns, 10 × 20 mm AA guns, 3 × 21 inch (533 mm) torpedo tubes, 1 × Hedgehog, 8 × depth charge throwers, 2 × depth charge tracks

USS Wagner (DER-539) was a John C. Butler-class destroyer escort in service the United States Navy from 1955 to 1960. She had been launched in 1943 but her construction was suspended until 1954. She was completed as a radar picket ship. After only five years of service she was laid up and later sunk as a target in 1975.

== History ==
Wagner (DE-539) was laid down on 8 November 1943 at Boston, Massachusetts, by the Boston Navy Yard; launched on 27 December 1943 in a double ceremony with Vandivier; and sponsored by Mrs. Alfred Thomas. The ship was named for Seaman second class William Daniel Wagner, a navy armed guard on SS Steel Navigator when the ship was sunk by German submarine U-610 on 19 October 1942.

Due to adjustments of wartime priorities and postwar cutbacks, construction of Wagner was suspended on 17 February 1947, while the ship was 61.5 percent complete. Towed to the Naval Industrial Reserve Shipyard, Boston, Massachusetts, the ship lay "mothballed" for the next seven years, until 1 July 1954.

=== Conversion to radar picket ship ===
Chosen for completion as a radar picket escort ship, Wagner was towed to the Boston Naval Shipyard (the renamed Boston Navy Yard), where construction was resumed. Re-designated DER-539, Wagner was commissioned on 22 November 1955.

She departed Boston on 4 January 1956 for the Caribbean and conducted shakedown out of Roosevelt Roads, Puerto Rico. Returning north, Wagner joined Escort Squadron 18 and operated out of Newport, Rhode Island. The ship conducted radar picket duty on the seaborne extension of the Distant Early Warning (DEW) line—the Eastern Contiguous Radar Coverage System and the Atlantic Barrier—into late 1959. Primarily operating in the North Atlantic Ocean, Wagner interrupted these lonely vigils in the Atlantic Barrier patrol system with visits to U.S. East Coast ports and an occasional deployment to the warmer climes of the Caribbean for refresher training.

=== Final deactivation ===
As more sophisticated systems diminished the need for these seaborne patrols, Wagner was placed "in commission, in reserve," on 31 March 1960 and arrived at Sabine Pass, Texas, on 1 April to commence lay-up preparations. Decommissioned in June 1960, Wagner lay in the Atlantic Fleet Reserve until struck from the Navy list on 1 November 1974. She was subsequently slated for use as a target.
