= USS Spinax =

Submarine of the United States

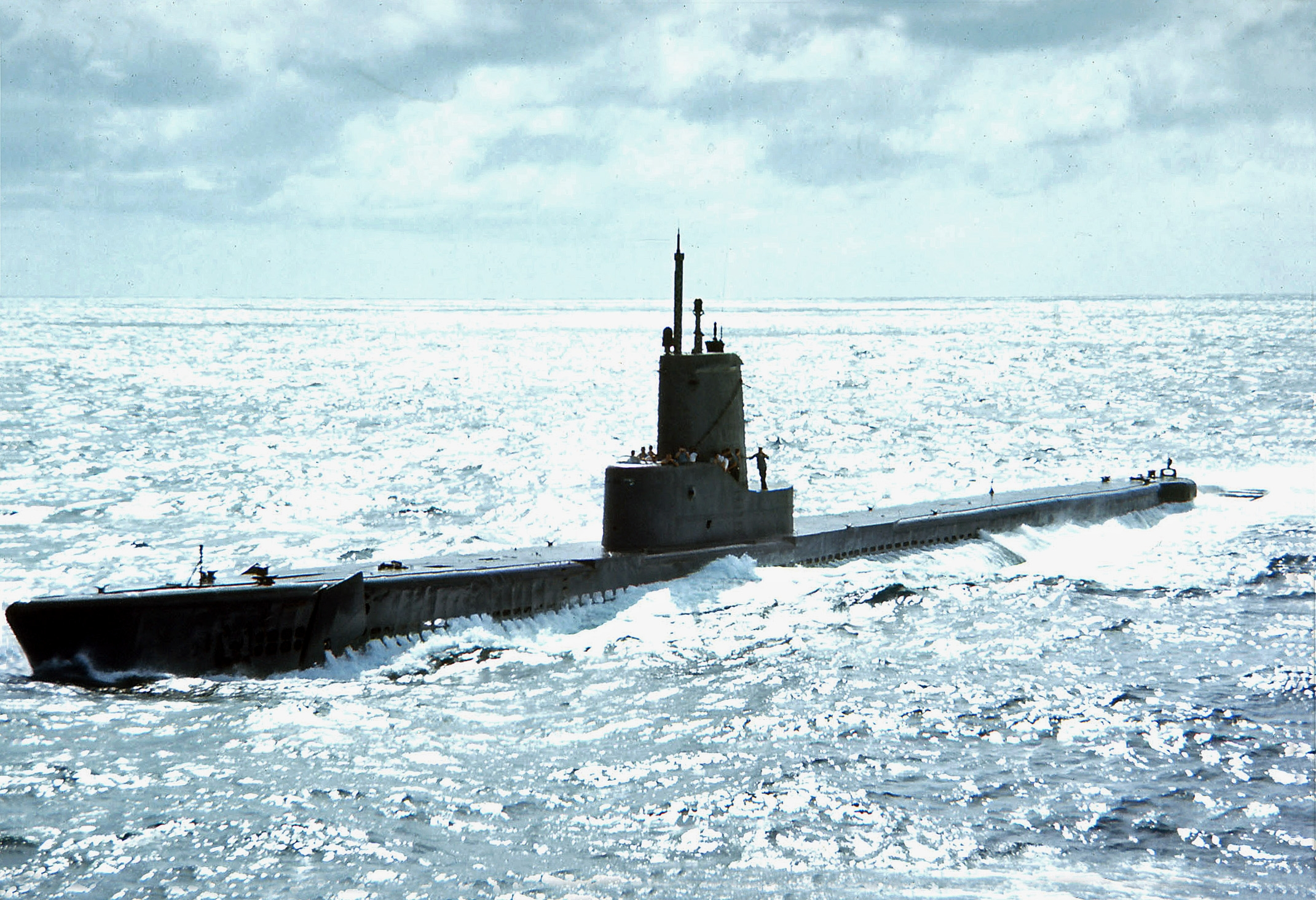
- USS Spinax (SS-489) in November 1965

History

United States
- Builder: Portsmouth Naval Shipyard, Kittery, Maine
- Laid down: 14 May 1945
- Launched: 20 November 1945
- Commissioned: 20 September 1946
- Decommissioned: 11 October 1969
- Stricken: 11 October 1969
- Fate: Sold for scrap, 13 June 1972

General characteristics
- Class & type: Tench-class diesel-electric submarine
- Displacement: 1,570 tons (1,595 t) surfaced; 2,414 tons (2,453 t) submerged
- Length: 311 ft 8 in (95.00 m)
- Beam: 27 ft 4 in (8.33 m)
- Draft: 17 ft (5.2 m) maximum
- Propulsion: 4 × Fairbanks-Morse Model 38D8-⅛ 10-cylinder opposed piston diesel engines driving electrical generators; 2 × 126-cell Sargo batteries; 2 × low-speed direct-drive Elliott electric motors; two propellers; 5,400 shp (4.0 MW) surfaced; 2,740 shp (2.0 MW) submerged
- Speed: 20.25 knots (38 km/h) surfaced; 8.75 knots (16 km/h) submerged
- Range: 11,000 nautical miles (20,000 km) surfaced at 10 knots (19 km/h)
- Endurance: 48 hours at 2 knots (3.7 km/h) submerged; 75 days on patrol
- Test depth: 400 ft (120 m)
- Complement: 10 officers, 71 enlisted
- Armament: 10 × 21-inch (533 mm) torpedo tubes; (6 forward, 4 aft); 28 torpedoes; 1 × 5-inch (127 mm) / 25 caliber deck gun; Bofors 40 mm and Oerlikon 20 mm cannon

USS Spinax (SS/SSR-489), a Tench-class submarine, was the only ship of the United States Navy named after the spinax, one of the spiny sharks (dogfish sharks) scientifically known as Squalidal. Her keel was laid down on 14 May 1945 by the Portsmouth Navy Yard. She was launched on 25 November 1945 sponsored by Mrs. Tom C. Clark, and commissioned on 20 September 1946.

== 1940s ==
Spinax moved to New London, Connecticut, on 15 November and was assigned to Submarine Force, Atlantic Fleet. On 15 December 1946, she sailed for the Caribbean Sea to begin her shakedown cruise which lasted until 28 January 1947. She returned to New London and participated in local operations until November when a fleet exercise took her north of the Arctic Circle near Labrador. In January 1948, designated a radar picket submarine, her hull classification symbol was changed from SS to SSR. After conducting operations in the Caribbean during the first part of the year, she returned to her home yard, Portsmouth Naval Shipyard, in May for an overhaul which lasted until the end of October. In addition to the installation of much radar and communication equipment, the work included the removal of her aft torpedo tubes, demilitarization of two forward tubes, installation of a snorkel system, and conversion of the after room into a combat information center. When she emerged from the yard, Spinax possessed the capabilities of a radar picket destroyer.

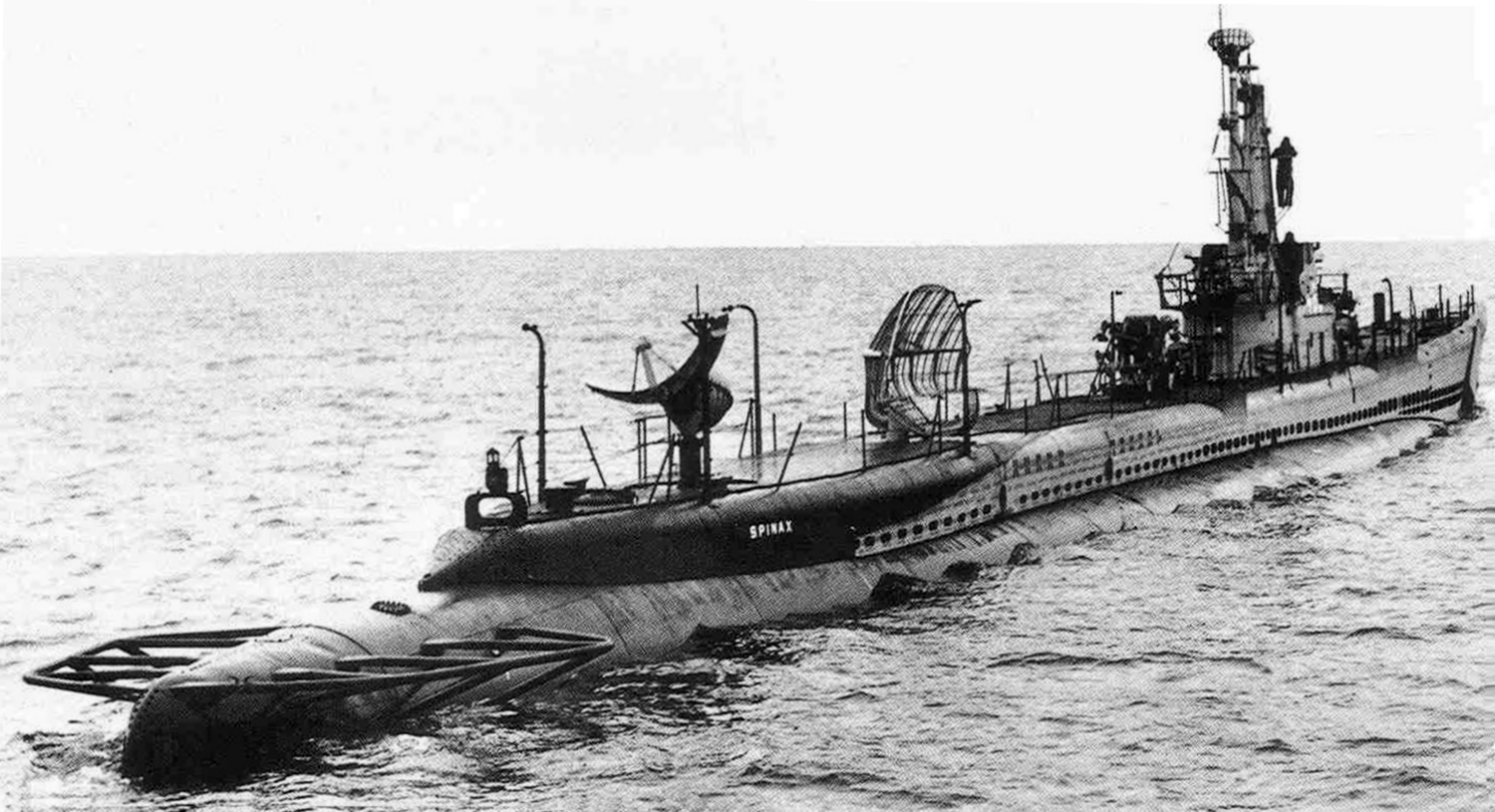
Spinax after her conversion to a radar picket submarine, 1947.

Spinax deployed to the Mediterranean Sea from 3 January to 3 March 1949, as the first postwar submarine unit of the Sixth Fleet. Upon her return to New London, she was assigned to Submarine Squadron (SubRon) 6 based at Norfolk, Virginia—the first time since World War I that submarines had been scheduled to operate from that base. She conducted operations along the east coast until again being deployed to the Sixth Fleet from 6 January to 23 May 1950. She returned to Norfolk until 12 June when she was transferred to the West Coast.

== 1950s ==
The submarine arrived at San Diego, California, on 29 June and proceeded up the coast to the San Francisco Naval Shipyard for an overhaul. She made a cruise to Pearl Harbor from 17 August to 16 October 1951 and returned to San Diego. She became a unit of Submarine Division 53 on 1 January 1952 and resumed her routine duties. Spinax was overhauled at Mare Island from April through early August and returned to San Diego on 7 August 1952.

Spinax operated out of that port until 1 November 1954 when she sailed for an extended tour in the Far East. The submarine operated with the Seventh Fleet and then visited the Philippines, Hong Kong, Formosa, and Japan before returning to San Diego on 7 May 1955. Overhaul at Mare Island from June through October 1956 was followed by refresher training in the San Diego area. She was deployed to the western Pacific from 4 January to 1 July 1957 and again from 3 July to 16 December 1958.

Emphasis in antisubmarine warfare resulted in Spinax’s being converted to a Fleet Snorkel submarine. This was accomplished at Mare Island from 13 April to 11 September 1959. All radar except search and fire control were removed, the communication facility was reduced to that of a regular submarine; and the combat information center was converted into living quarters. The ship received improved sonar and fire control equipment, and modifications were made to her hull. On 15 August, she resumed the hull classification symbol SS-489. When the conversion was completed, the submarine conducted refresher training and local operations until early 1960.

A brief shot of the ship was used in the 1953 sci-fi movie "Phantom from Space" where she is seen on radar picket duty.

== 1960s and fate ==
Spinax departed San Diego on 3 May 1960 for a tour in the western Pacific with the Seventh Fleet which lasted until 3 November when she returned to her home port. Thereafter, except for four deployments in the Far East, her west coast operations were interrupted only by yard overhauls. Spinax was deployed from 27 June to 17 December 1962; from 18 August 1965 to 15 March 1966; from 6 January to 25 June 1967; and from February to 13 August 1969 when she last returned to Mare Island.

In September 1969, Spinax was declared unfit for further service. She was decommissioned and struck from the Naval Vessel Register on 11 October 1969. Her hulk was sold to Zidell Explorations, Incorporated, on 13 June 1972 and scrapped.
