= HNLMS Eridanus =

Government Navy patrol boat

Class overview
- Name: Eridanus class
- Preceded by: Gemma
- Succeeded by: Fomalhaut
- In service: 1922–1949
- Planned: 1
- Completed: 1
- Retired: 1

History

Netherlands
- Name: Eridanus
- Builder: Marine Etablissement, Surabaya
- Laid down: 1918
- Launched: 1922
- Commissioned: March 1922
- Renamed: Enoshima Maru (Japanese service)
- Fate: Scuttled 1942; Raised and repaired by Japanese forces in 1943; Transferred to Indonesian Navy in 1949

General characteristics
- Type: Patrol boat
- Displacement: 996 t (980 long tons) standard
- Length: 56.5 m (185 ft 4 in)
- Beam: 9 m (29 ft 6 in)
- Draught: 3.52 m (11 ft 7 in)
- Installed power: 840 hp (630 kW)
- Propulsion: 1 × Werkspoor triple expansion
- Speed: 12.25 knots (22.69 km/h; 14.10 mph)
- Complement: 54
- Armament: 2 × 3.7 cm (1.5 in) cannons

HNLMS Eridanus was a Government Navy patrol boat constructed at the Marine Etablissement in Surabaya. She would be militarized by the Royal Netherlands Navy upon the start of the Pacific theatre of World War II.

== Service history ==
HNLMS Eridanus was stationed at Tandjong Priok when war broke out. She was soon transferred to Makassar to serve alongside HNLMS Tydeman. She retreated to Surabaya harbor after the fall of Makassar where she was scuttled by her own crew on 2 March 1942 due to the fall of Java and the ship's inability to escape to Australia.

Eridanus was raised by Japanese forces on 8 June 1943, repaired and commissioned as the tugboat and recovery vessel Enoshima Maru. After the war the ship was rediscovered in 1946 and recommissioned as a barracks ship. She was transferred to the new Indonesian Navy in 1949.
