= HNLMS Fomalhaut =

World War II Dutch patrol ship

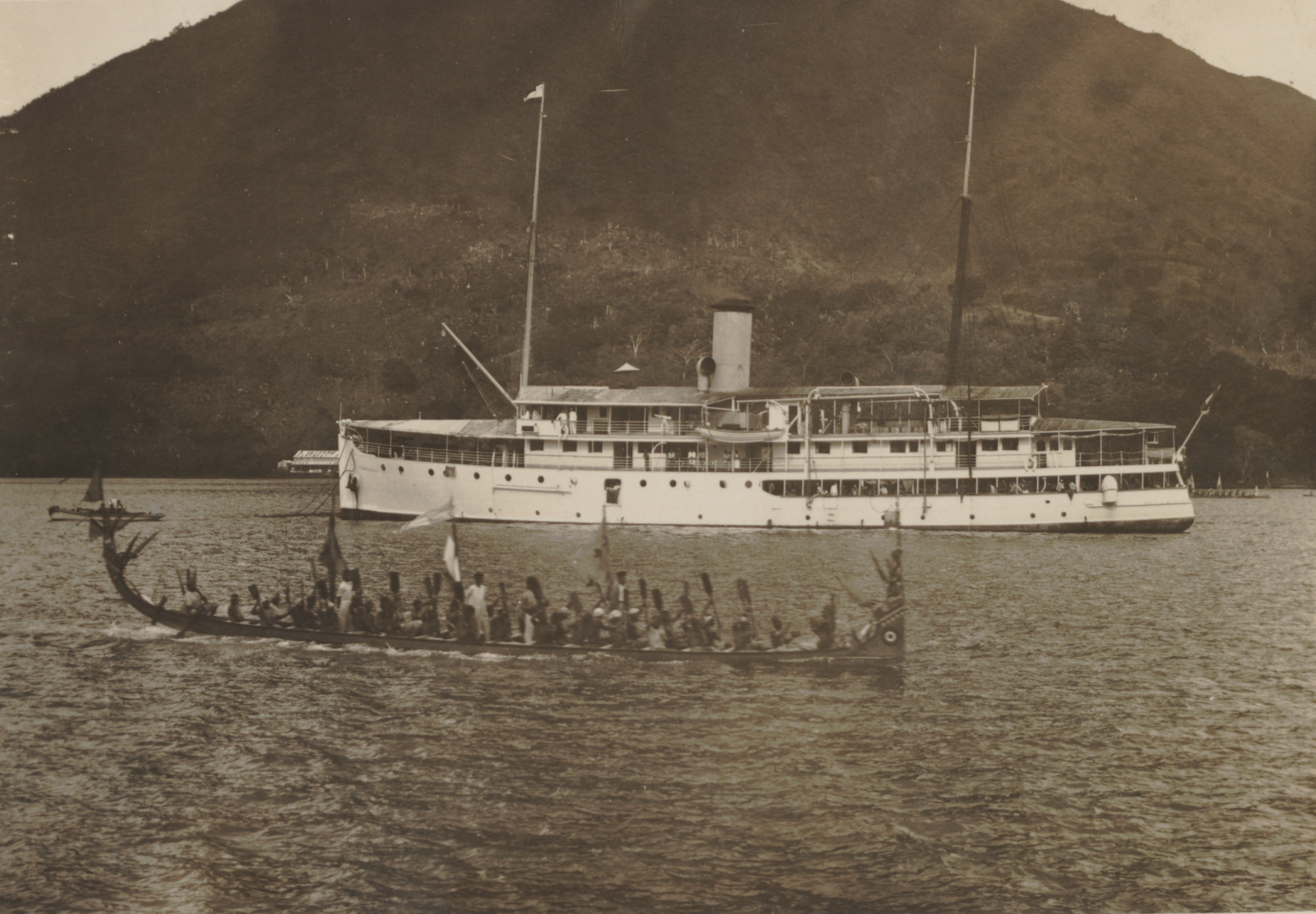
- HNLMS Fomalhaut with a canoe in front

Class overview
- Name: Fomalhaut class
- Preceded by: Eridanus
- Succeeded by: Sirius class
- In service: 1923–1942
- Planned: 1
- Completed: 1
- Lost: 1

History

Netherlands
- Name: Fomalhaut
- Builder: Marine Etablissement, Surabaya
- Laid down: 1922
- Launched: 1923
- Commissioned: 30 October 1923
- Fate: Damaged by Japanese air attack and scuttled

General characteristics
- Type: Patrol boat
- Displacement: 1,001 t (985 long tons) standard
- Length: 56.75 m (186 ft 2 in)
- Beam: 9.47 m (31 ft 1 in)
- Draught: 3.3 m (10 ft 10 in)
- Installed power: 855 hp (638 kW)
- Propulsion: 1 × quadruple expansion
- Speed: 12 knots (22 km/h; 14 mph)
- Complement: 47
- Armament: 2 × 3.7 cm (1.5 in) cannons

HNLMS Fomalhaut was a Government Navy patrol boat constructed at the Marine Etablissement in Surabaya. She was militarized by the Royal Netherlands Navy upon the start of the Pacific theatre of World War II.

== Service history ==
HNLMS Fomalhaut was stationed in the Moluccas when war broke out. She took part in many patrols and escorts the most notable of which was the evacuation of women and children from Koepang to Java together with HNLMS Albatros. While underway, both ships would also escort a ship of the Koninklijke Nederlandse Stoomboot-Maatschappij. While in Surabaya, the ship was damaged by a Japanese air attack resulting in the ship being scuttled by her own crew on 2 March 1942.
