= HNLMS Aldebaran =

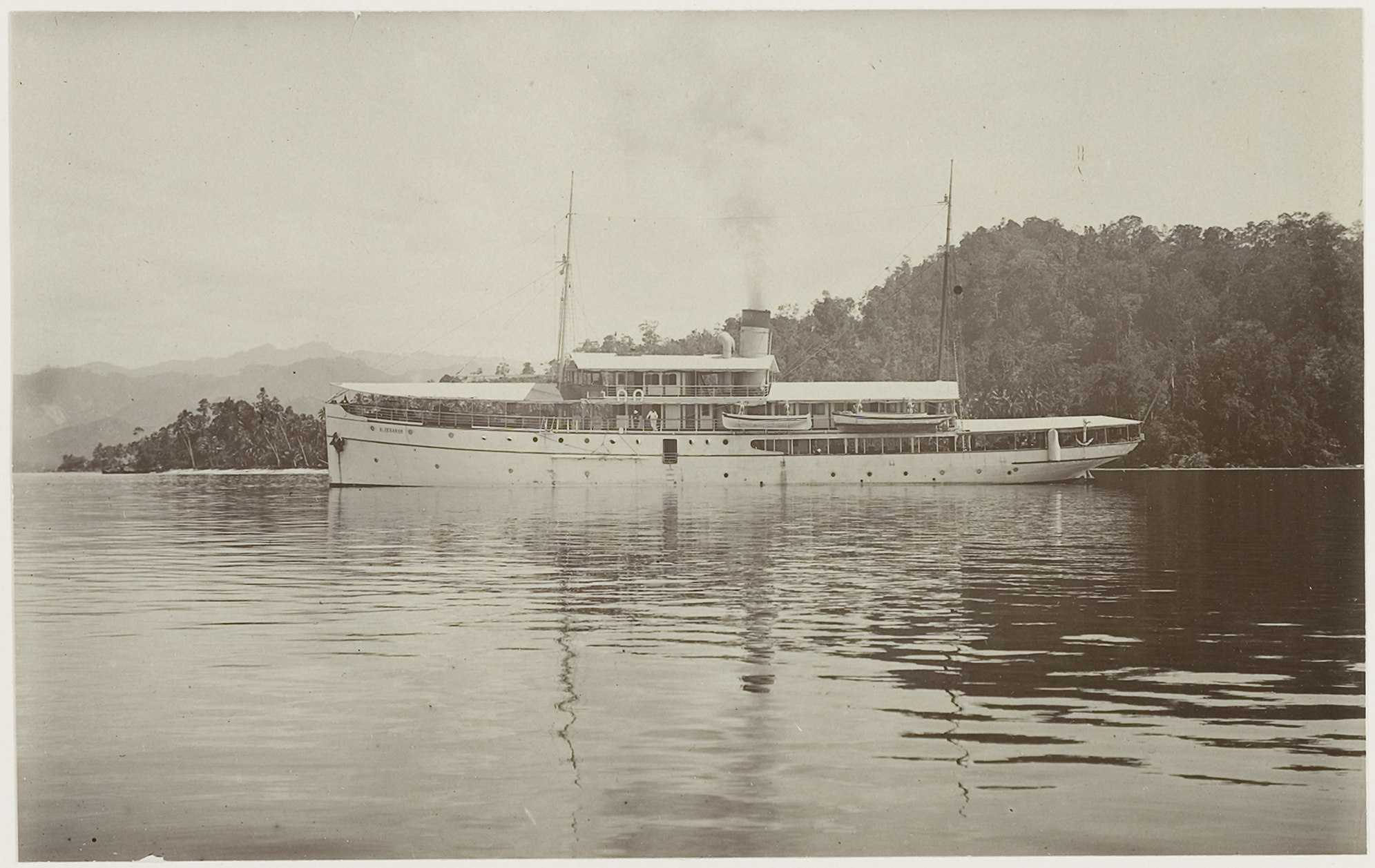
- HNLMS Aldebaran

History

Netherlands
- Name: Aldebaran
- Builder: Marine Etablissement, Surabaya
- Laid down: 1912
- Launched: 1913
- Commissioned: 1913
- Out of service: 2 March 1942
- Fate: Scuttled by own crew

Class overview
- Name: Aldebaran class
- Preceded by: Albatros
- Succeeded by: Bellatrix
- In service: 1913-1942
- Planned: 1
- Completed: 1
- Lost: 1

General characteristics
- Type: Patrol boat
- Displacement: 892 t (878 long tons) standard
- Length: 53.36 m (175 ft 1 in)
- Beam: 8.23 m (27 ft 0 in)
- Draught: 3 m (9 ft 10 in)
- Installed power: 820 hp (610 kW)
- Propulsion: 1 × Werkspoor triple expansion
- Speed: 12.25 knots (22.69 km/h; 14.10 mph)
- Complement: 44

HNLMS Aldebaran was a Government Navy patrol boat. She would be militarized by the Royal Netherlands Navy upon the start of the Pacific theatre of World War II.

== Service history ==
HNLMS Aldebaran was stationed at Makassar when war broke out. She would be transferred to Surabaya harbor where she would serve as an accommodation ship and guard ship due to stability issues that she had suffered from ever since commissioning.

After the fall of Java, she would be scuttled by her own crew on 2 March 1942 as it was not deemed possible to escape to Australia by that point.
