= HNLMS Gemma =

Government Navy patrol boat

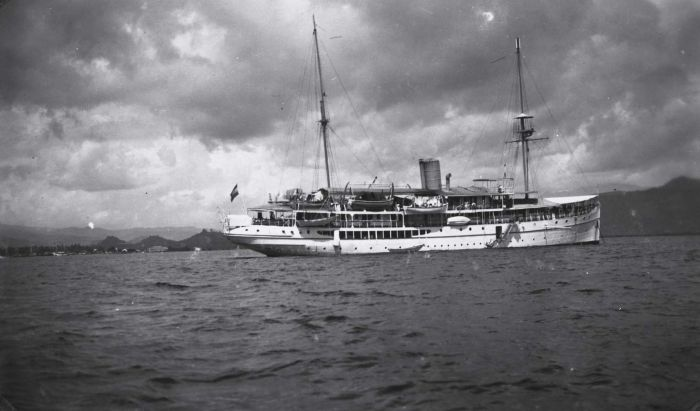
- HNLMS Gemma before militarization

Class overview
- Name: Gemma class
- Preceded by: Bellatrix class
- Succeeded by: Eridanus
- In service: 1920–1949
- Planned: 1
- Completed: 1
- Retired: 1

History

Netherlands
- Name: Gemma
- Builder: Werf Gusto A.F. Smulders, Schiedam
- Laid down: 1918
- Launched: 1920
- Commissioned: 22 April 1920
- Fate: Scuttled 1942; Raised and repaired by Japanese forces in 1943; Transferred to Indonesian Navy in 1949

General characteristics
- Type: Patrol boat
- Displacement: 842 t (829 long tons) standard
- Length: 53.4 m (175 ft 2 in)
- Beam: 9 m (29 ft 6 in)
- Draught: 3.2 m (10 ft 6 in)
- Installed power: 840 hp (630 kW)
- Propulsion: 1 × Werkspoor triple expansion
- Speed: 11.5 knots (21.3 km/h; 13.2 mph)
- Complement: 44
- Armament: 1 × 7.5 cm (3.0 in) cannon

HNLMS Gemma was a Government Navy patrol boat. She was militarized by the Royal Netherlands Navy upon the start of the Pacific theatre of World War II.

== Service history ==
HNLMS Gemma was stationed at Makassar when war broke out. She was planned for transfer to Surabaya harbor to receive maintenance, however, even Surabaya was not safe due to the fall of Java and her crew was forced to scuttle Gemma on 2 March 1942.

=== Japanese service ===
Gemma was raised by Japanese forces on 28 January 1943, be repaired and commissioned as the transport ship Kita Maru. After the war the ship was rediscovered and recommissioned as a hydrographic survey vessel. She was transferred to the new Indonesian Navy in 1949.
