= HNLMS Poolster =

HNLMS Poolster (Dutch: Hr.Ms. or Zr.Ms. Poolster) may refer to the following ships of the Royal Netherlands Navy that have been named after the star Polaris:

- HNLMS Poolster (1939), a seaplane tender and salvage ship commissioned into the Royal Netherlands Navy in 1939 and serving in the Second World War.
- HNLMS Poolster (A835), a replenishment ship serving with the Royal Netherlands Navy from 1964 until 1994.
