= HNLMS Poolster (1939) =

Royal Netherlands Navy Auxiliary

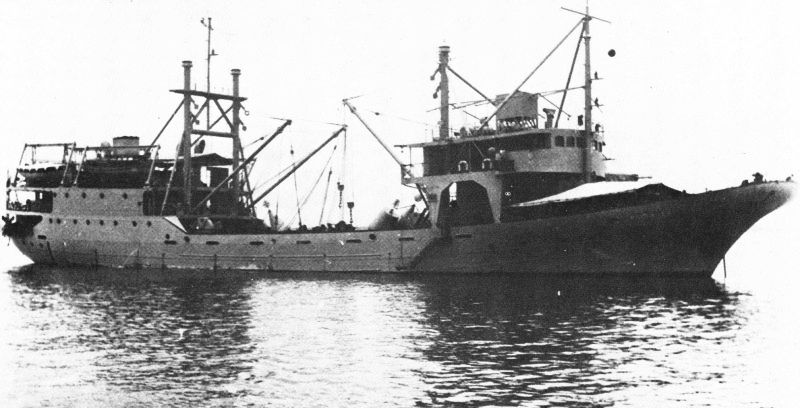
- HNLMS Poolster (1939)

History

Netherlands
- Name: Poolster
- Namesake: Poolster
- Builder: Droogdok Maatschappij, Tandjong Priok
- Laid down: 26 May 1938
- Launched: 3 February 1939
- Commissioned: 23 October 1939
- In service: 1939-1945
- Out of service: 2 March 1942
- Renamed: Horei Maru (Imperial Japanese Navy serving as salvage ship)
- Fate: Scuttled 2 March 1942 by RNN, raised by IJN on 1 September 1943 and sunk by American aircraft 4 April 1945.

General characteristics
- Type: Auxiliary, submarine tender, seaplane tender, salvage ship
- Displacement: 1,565 t (1,540 long tons) standard
- Length: 74.72 m (245 ft 2 in)
- Beam: 12 m (39 ft 4 in)
- Draught: 3 m (9 ft 10 in)
- Installed power: 1,250 hp (930 kW)
- Propulsion: 4-stroke Smit-MAN Diesel engine powering a single screw
- Speed: 12 knots (22 km/h; 14 mph)
- Complement: 90
- Armament: 1 × single 75 mm (3.0 in) British HA/LA guns; 2 × single 12.7 mm (0.50 in) Vickers

HNLMS Poolster was a Royal Netherlands Navy auxiliary ship. Originally constructed for the Government Navy as a replacement for HNLMS Hoofdinspecteur Zeeman, she would instead be transferred to the Royal Netherlands Navy while still under construction.

Once completed in 1939, she was commissioned into the Royal Netherlands Navy as a seaplane tender and salvage ship. During the Second World War she would also serve as a submarine tender if the opportunity arose.

== Service history ==
Poolster served throughout the Second World War. Initially in Dutch service until her scuttling in March 1942 as she was unable to escape after the fall of Java. She was raised by Japanese forces in September 1943 and continued service there as a salvage ship until sunk by USAAF bombers in April 1945.
