= Sirius-class patrol ship =

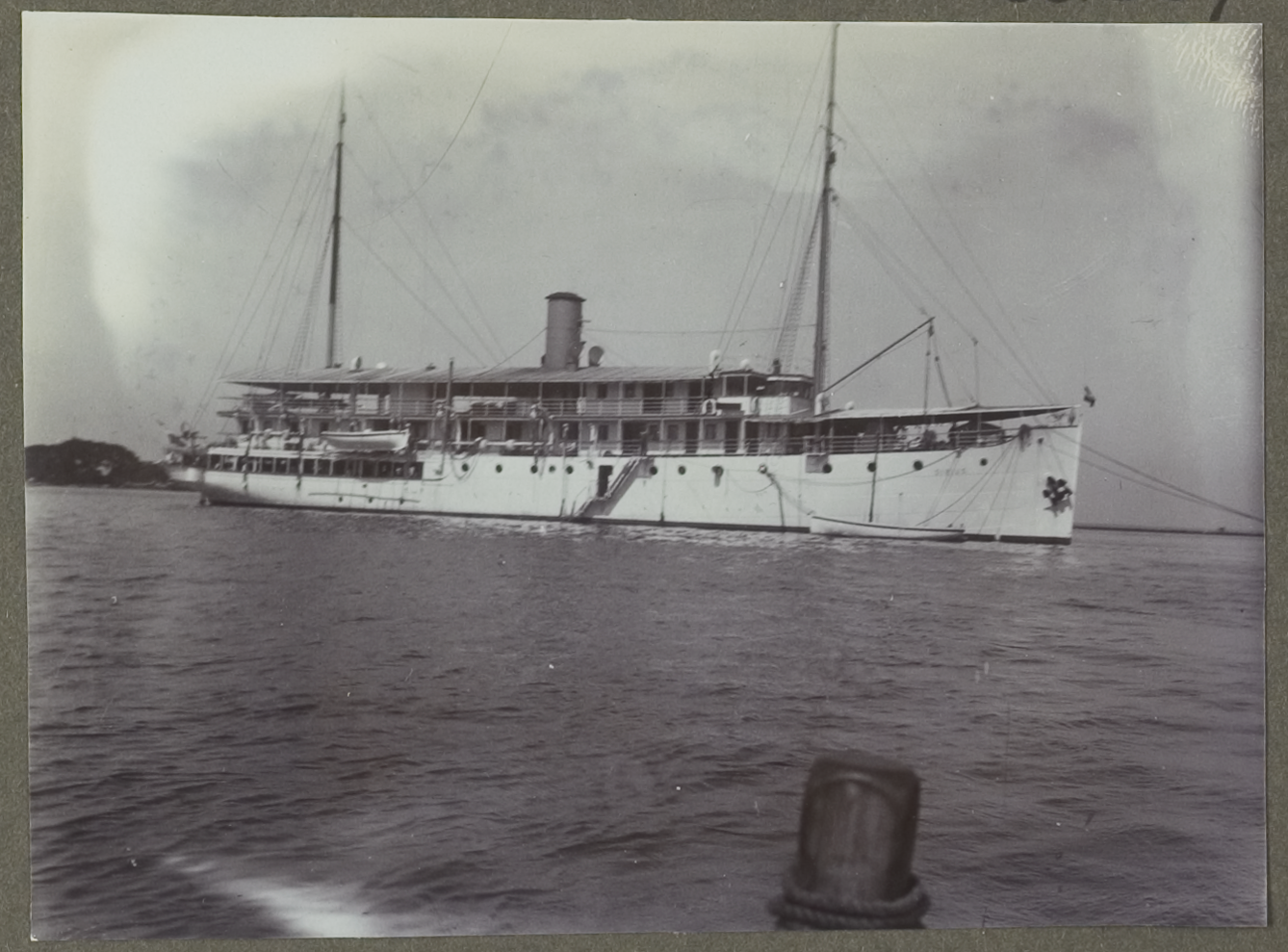
- HNLMS Sirius before militarization

Class overview
- Name: Sirius class
- Builders: IJselwerf, Gorinchem
- Operators: Royal Netherlands Navy
- Preceded by: HNLMS Fomalhaut
- Succeeded by: Merel class
- In service: 1923–1942
- Planned: 2
- Completed: 2
- Lost: 2

General characteristics
- Type: Patrol ship, seaplane tender
- Displacement: 1,018 tons
- Length: 56.64 m (185 ft 10 in)
- Beam: 9.54 m (31 ft 4 in)
- Draught: 3.3 m (10 ft 10 in)
- Propulsion: 1 × 916 ihp (683 kW) triple expansion engine
- Speed: 12 knots (22 km/h)
- Complement: 54
- Armament: 1 × 7.5 cm (3.0 in) cannon; 1 x 7.7 mm (0.30 in) machine gun

The Sirius class was a class of two patrol boats built by the Ijselwerf at Gorinchem for service with the Government Navy. The class consisted of HNLMS Sirius and HNLMS Wega.

== Construction ==
| Name | Laid Down | Commissioned | Fate |
|---|---|---|---|
| Sirius | 1922 | 1923 | Scuttled by own crew 28 February 1942 after being damaged by Japanese aircraft |
| Wega | 1922 | 1923 | Sunk on 26 January 1942 after receiving three bomb hits from Japanese bombers |

== Service history ==
The Sirius class were originally constructed as patrol ships for the Government Navy for service in the Dutch East Indies. Upon the outbreak of the Second World War, these ships were militarized and commissioned into the Royal Netherlands Navy. Initially only equipped with a 7.5 cm (3.0 in) cannon, they received a 7.7 mm (0.30 in) machine gun as air defense weapon upon their militarization.

HNLMS Sirius' patrolled around western Java together with HNLMS Reiger until they were attacked on 28 February 1942 by Japanese bomber aircraft. A near-miss damaged Sirius' hull and forced her to retreat to Tandjong Priok harbor. Upon her retreat she was spotted and came under fire again causing her captain to decide to ground the vessel on a nearby beach. The crew was able to escape the sinking vessel.

HNLMS Wega was stationed as a patrol ship near Singapore and northern Sumatra. There, she became the target of Japanese bombers on 26 January 1942. While attempting to evade, Wega received three direct hits causing her captain to decide to beach the ship. Before reaching the beach, the order was given to abandon ship, allowing the crew to safely reach shore even though Wega sank.
