= Merel-class patrol ship =

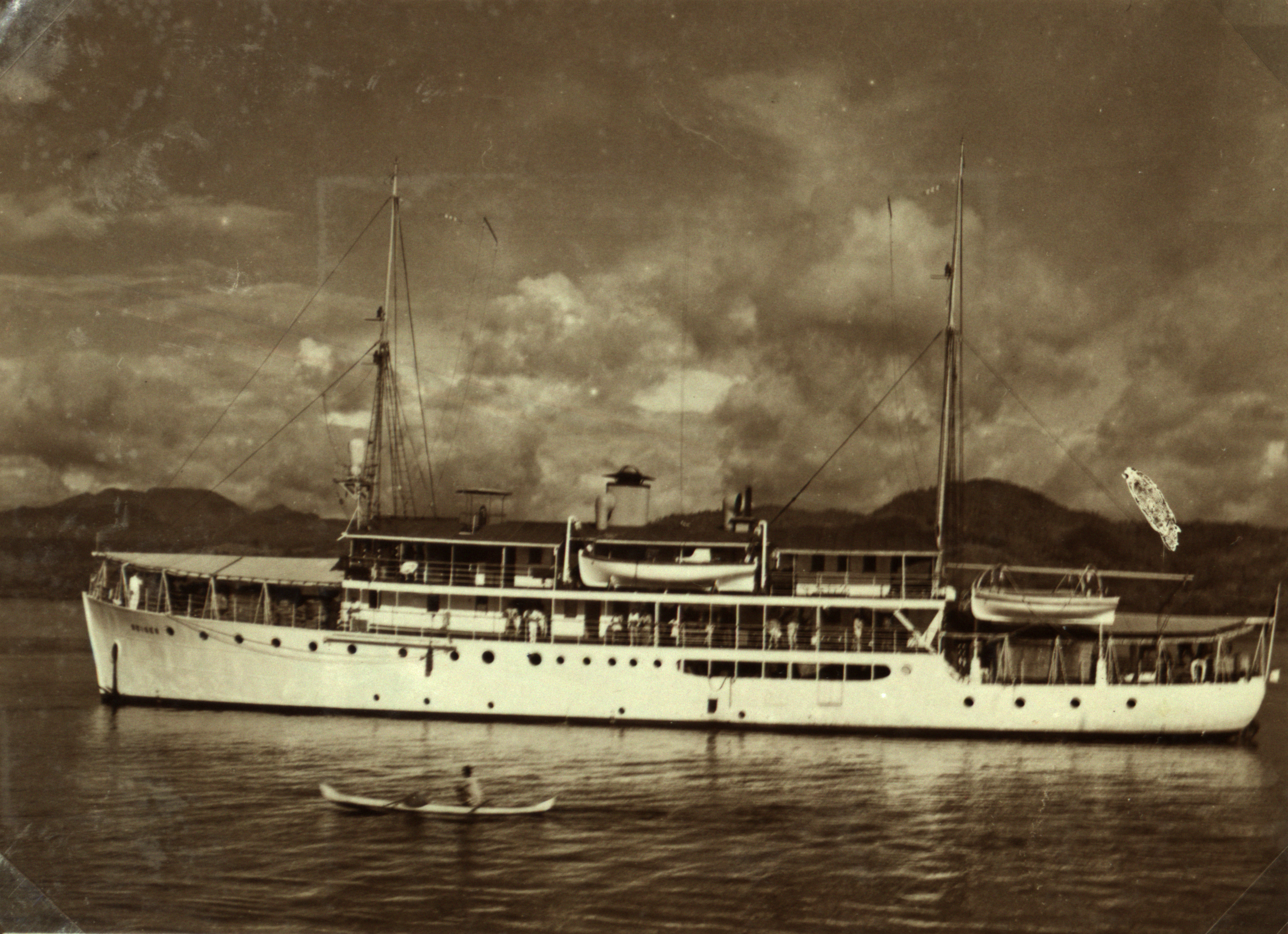
- HNLMS Reiger

Class overview
- Name: Merel class
- Builders: IJselwerf, Gorinchem
- Operators: Royal Netherlands Navy
- Preceded by: Sirius class
- Succeeded by: Ambon
- In service: 1928–1949
- Planned: 3
- Completed: 3
- Lost: 2
- Retired: 1

General characteristics
- Type: Patrol ship, seaplane tender
- Displacement: 600 tons
- Length: 47.78 m (156 ft 9 in)
- Beam: 8.4 m (27 ft 7 in)
- Draught: 2.7 m (8 ft 10 in)
- Propulsion: 1 × 700 ihp (520 kW) Deutz diesel engine
- Speed: 12 knots (22 km/h)
- Complement: 39
- Armament: 1 × 7.5 cm (3.0 in) cannon; 1 × 7.7 mm (0.30 in) machine gun

The Merel class was a class of three patrol boats built by the Marine Etablissement in Surabaya for service with the Government Navy. The class consisted of HNLMS Merel, HNLMS Reiger and HNLMS Fazant and would soon after entering service be rebuilt into seaplane tenders.

== Construction ==
Name	Laid Down	Commissioned	Fate
Merel	1928	1930	Scuttled by own crew 28 February 1942
Reiger	1930	1931	Accidentally beached while in combat with Japanese ships 28 February 1942
Fazant	1931	1932	Scuttled by own crew 1 March 1942, raised by Japanese forces 31 July 1944

== Service history ==
The Merel class was ordered as a replacement for older Government Navy coal-stoked vessels. Originally constructed as patrol ships, all three ships of the class were converted to seaplane tenders between 1936 and 1938. Upon the outbreak of the Second World War, these ships were militarized and commissioned into the Royal Netherlands Navy. Initially only equipped with a 7.5-centimetre (3.0 in) cannon, they received a 7.7-millimetre (0.30 in) machine gun as air defence weapon upon their militarization. The ships of this class were the last Government Navy patrol ships to be built preceding World War II.

HNLMS Merel was stationed near Singapore upon the outbreak of the Second World War. She was quickly pulled back to serve around west Java. On 28 February 1942 west Java would be closed off by Japanese ships, trapping Merel, forcing her crew to scuttle the ship.

HNLMS Reiger was stationed in the Moluccas upon the outbreak of the war. She was pulled back to join her sister ship Merel and the Sirius-class patrol ship HNLMS Sirius around west Java. On 28 February 1942 Reiger and Sirius came under attack by Japanese bomber aircraft, damaging Sirius. That same night the ships were rediscovered and ended up in a gunfight with Japanese ships. Attempting to find shelter while continuously returning fire, Reiger accidentally got beached on a reef. Her crew abandoned ship and swam ashore where they were later captured by a Japanese patrol.

HNLMS Fazant was stationed near the Moluccas at the outbreak of hostilities, serving as patrol vessel and seaplane tender. All her aircraft were lost by the end of 1941 prompting her retreat to west Java. After being surrounded by Japanese ships and unable to escape she was scuttled by her own crew on 1 March 1942. The wreck was raised by Japanese forces on 31 July 1944 and recommissioned into Japanese service as Patrol boat 109. The vessel was returned after the war, but never repaired and would be transferred to the Indonesian Navy in 1949.
