= HNLMS Woendi =

LST-542-class landing ship tank

History

United States
- Name: LST-1034
- Builder: Boston Navy Yard, Boston
- Laid down: 26 June 1944
- Launched: 4 August 1944
- Sponsored by: Mrs. Edith A. Gannon
- Commissioned: 26 August 1944
- Stricken: 29 October 1946
- Fate: Sold to the Netherlands

Netherlands
- Name: Woendi
- Commissioned: 13 October 1946
- Decommissioned: 12 August 1952
- Stricken: 28 August 1972
- Identification: Hull number: A832
- Fate: Sold for scrap

General characteristics
- Class & type: LST-542-class tank landing ship
- Displacement: 1,625 long tons (1,651 t) light
- Length: 99.89 m (327 ft 9 in)
- Beam: 15.24 m (50 ft 0 in)
- Draft: 3.40 m (11 ft 2 in)
- Propulsion: 2 × General Motors 12-567 diesel engines, two shafts, twin rudders
- Speed: 11 knots (20 km/h; 13 mph)
- Crew: 105
- Armament: 4 × 40 mm guns; 6 × 20 mm guns

HNLMS Woendi (A832) (ex-USS LST-1034) was a LST-542-class tank landing ship in service with the United States Navy during World War II. She was commissioned into the Royal Netherlands Navy on 13 October 1946.

== Construction and commissioning ==
LST-1034 was laid down on 26 June 1944 at Boston Navy Yard, Boston, Massachusetts. Launched on 4 August 1944 and commissioned on 26 August 1944.

== Service history ==
=== United States service ===
During World War II, she operated in the Asiatic-Pacific theater where she took part in the landings on Mindanao during the Battle of Mindanao. For this she earned a Battle Star.

=== Dutch service ===
After World War II she was acquired by Dienst Van Scheepvaart and named LST V, and later Steven van der Hagen. On 13 October 1946 she was commissioned into the Royal Netherlands Navy as Woendi where she was used as a transport vessel. From July 1951 until June 1952, she was used as a barracks ship in Hollandia, then part of Dutch New Guinea. A decommissioning ceremony took place on 12 August 1952, but Woendi remained in reserve until 1972 when she was sold to van Castricum & Co in Rotterdam.
