= Japanese battleship Kirishima =

Battleship of the Imperial Japanese Navy

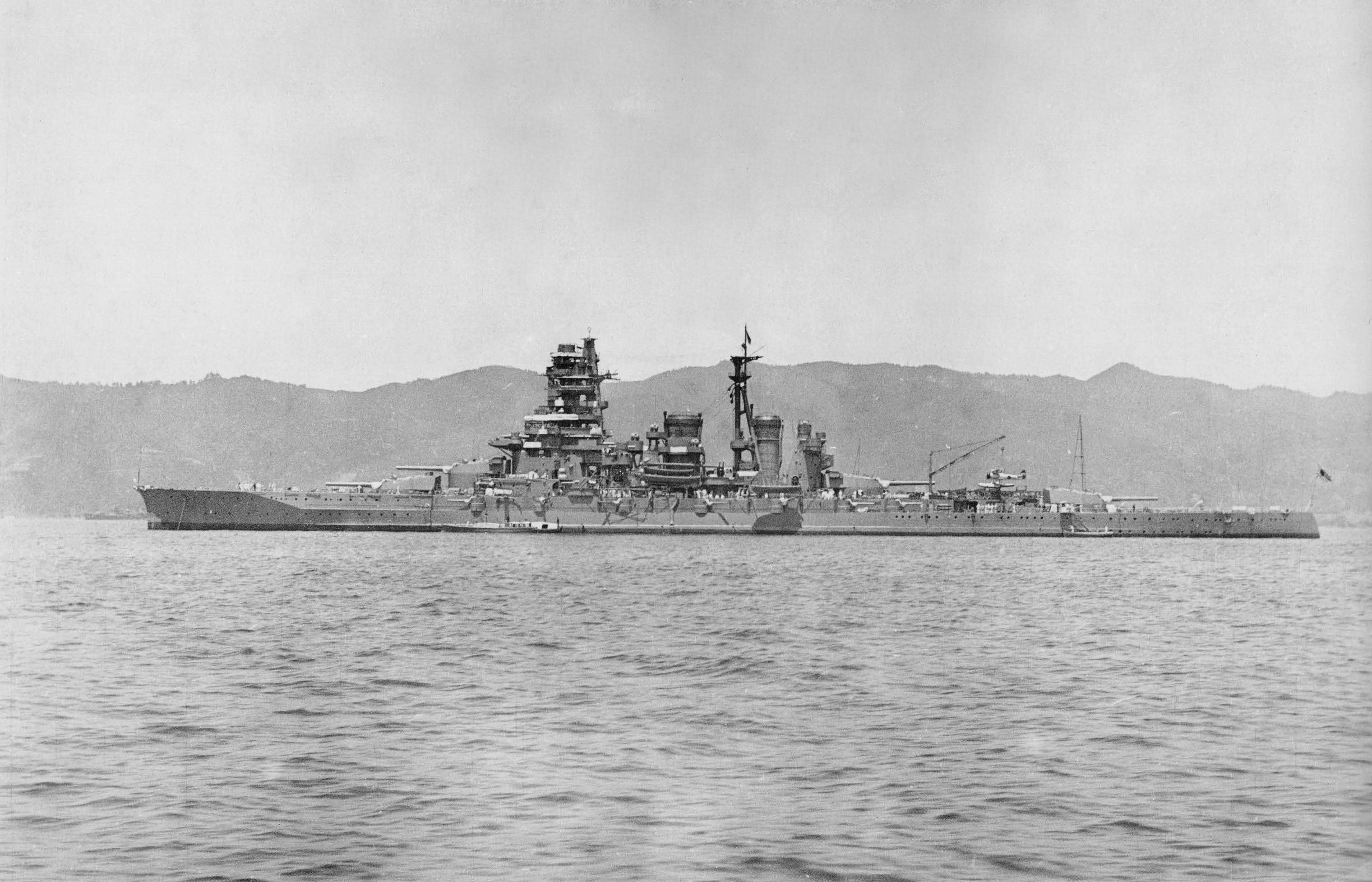
- Kirishima anchored at Sukumo Bay, 10 May 1937.

History

Empire of Japan
- Name: Kirishima
- Namesake: Mount Kirishima
- Ordered: November 1910
- Builder: Mitsubishi
- Laid down: 17 March 1912
- Launched: 1 December 1913
- Commissioned: 19 April 1915
- Fate: Sunk by USS Washington following the Naval Battle of Guadalcanal, 15 November 1942

General characteristics (as built)
- Class & type: Kongō-class battlecruiser
- Displacement: 26,739 t (26,317 long tons) (normal)
- Length: 214.6 m (704 ft 1 in)
- Beam: 28 m (91 ft 10 in)
- Draught: 8.2 m (26 ft 11 in)
- Installed power: 36 Yarrow boilers; 64,000 shp (48,000 kW)
- Propulsion: 4 shafts; 2 steam turbine sets
- Speed: 27.8 knots (51.5 km/h; 32.0 mph)
- Range: 8,000 nmi (15,000 km; 9,200 mi) at 14 knots (26 km/h; 16 mph)
- Complement: 1,221
- Armament: 4 × twin 356 mm (14 in) guns; 16 × single 152 mm (6 in) guns; 4 × single 76.2 mm (3 in) AA guns; 8 × 533 mm (21 in) torpedo tubes
- Armor: Waterline belt: 76–203 mm (3–8 in); Deck: 19–25 mm (0.75–0.98 in); Barbettes: 76–254 mm (3–10 in); Gun turrets: 229–254 mm (9–10 in)

General characteristics (1942)
- Type: Fast battleship
- Displacement: 32,490 t (31,980 long tons) (standard)
- Length: 222.65 m (730 ft 6 in) (o/a)
- Beam: 31.02 m (101 ft 9 in)
- Draught: 10.29 m (33 ft 9 in)
- Installed power: 8 × water-tube boilers; 136,000 shp (101,000 kW)
- Propulsion: 4 × geared steam turbines
- Speed: 29.8 knots (55.2 km/h; 34.3 mph)
- Range: 7,000 nmi (13,000 km; 8,100 mi) at 18 knots (33 km/h; 21 mph)
- Complement: 1,318
- Sensors & processing systems: 1 × Type 21 air-search radar; 2 × Type 13 early-warning radar; 2 × Type 22 surface-search radar
- Armament: 4 × twin 356 mm guns; 14 × single 152 mm guns; 4 × twin 127 mm (5 in) DP guns; 10 × twin Type 96 25 mm (1 in) AA guns
- Armor: Deck: 120–80 mm (4.7–3.1 in); Barbettes: 343 mm (13.5 in)
- Aircraft carried: 3 × floatplanes
- Aviation facilities: 1 × catapult

Kirishima (Japanese: 霧島) was one of four Kongō-class battlecruisers built for the Imperial Japanese Navy (IJN) during the 1910s. Completed in 1915, the ship played minor roles in World War I and the Second Sino-Japanese War, but she was very active during World War II. Kirishima patrolled on occasion off the Chinese coast during World War I, and helped with rescue efforts following the 1923 Great Kantō earthquake.

Starting in 1927, Kirishima's first reconstruction rebuilt her as a battleship, strengthening her armor and improving her speed. From 1934, a second reconstruction completely rebuilt her superstructure, upgraded her propulsion machinery, and equipped her with launch catapults for floatplanes. Now fast enough to accompany Japan's growing carrier fleet, she was reclassified as a fast battleship. During the Second Sino-Japanese War, Kirishima acted primarily as a support vessel and troop transport, moving army troops to mainland China. On the eve of the Pacific War, she sailed as part of Vice-Admiral Chuichi Nagumo's Kido Butai as an escort for the six carriers that attacked Pearl Harbor on 7 December 1941.

As part of the Third Battleship Division, Kirishima participated in many of the Imperial Japanese Navy's early actions in 1942, providing support for the invasion of the Dutch East Indies (now Indonesia) and in the Indian Ocean raid from February to April 1942, during which she helped to sink the destroyer USS Edsall and the Dutch patrol ship Hoofdinspecteur Zeeman. During the Battle of Midway, she escorted Nagumo's four carriers, before redeploying to the Solomon Islands during the Battle of Guadalcanal. She escorted Japanese carrier fleets during the battles of the Eastern Solomons and Santa Cruz Islands, before sailing as part of a bombardment force under Admiral Nobutake Kondō during the Naval Battle of Guadalcanal.

On the evening of 13 November 1942, Kirishima engaged American cruisers and destroyers alongside her sister ship Hiei. On the night of 14/15 November, in one of only two battleship duels of the Pacific War, Kirishima badly damaged the American battleship USS South Dakota before being fatally wounded in turn by gunfire from the battleship USS Washington. Kirishima capsized and sank in the early morning on 15 November in Ironbottom Sound.

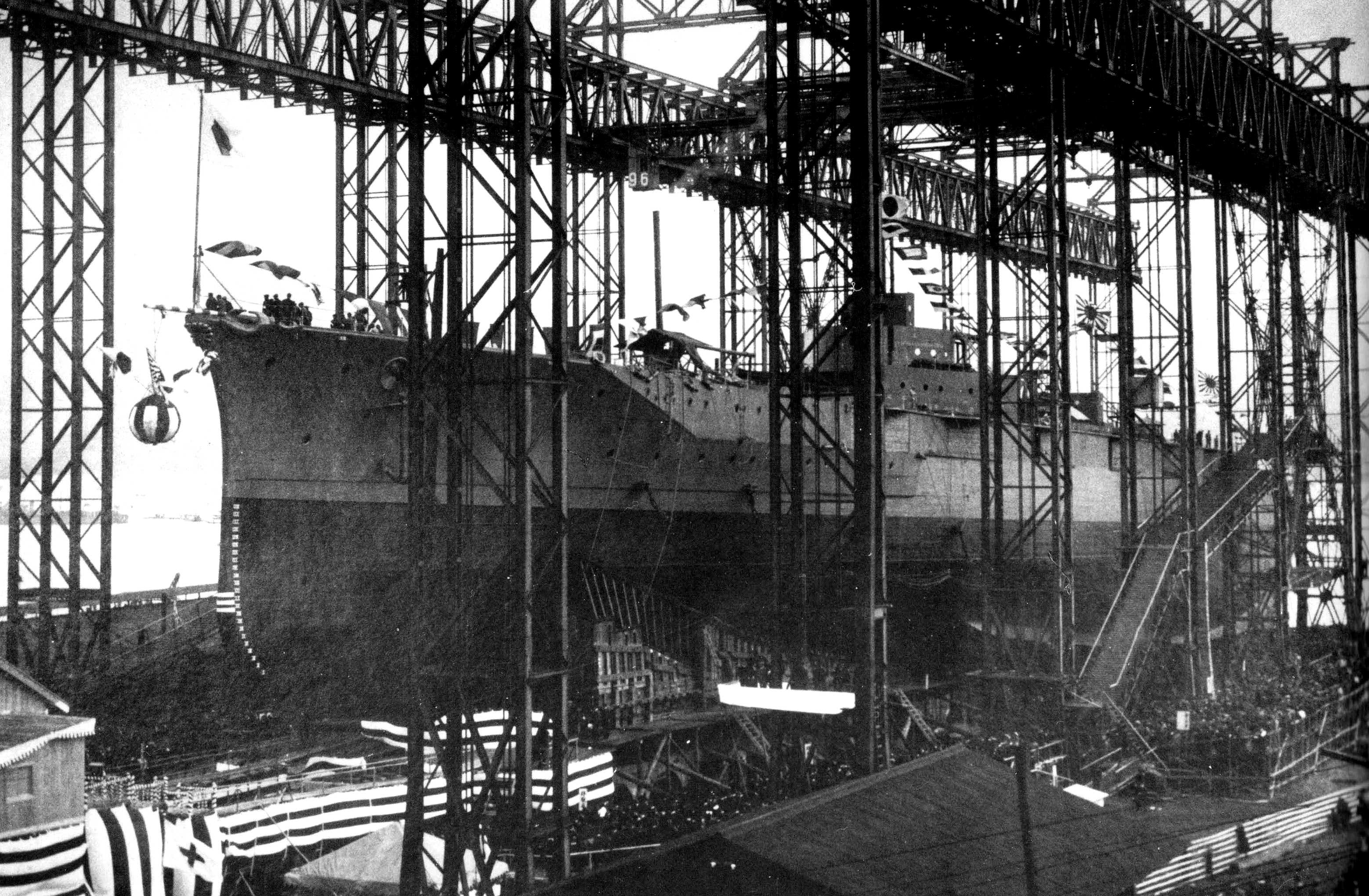
Kirishima being launched, 1 December 1913

== Design and description ==
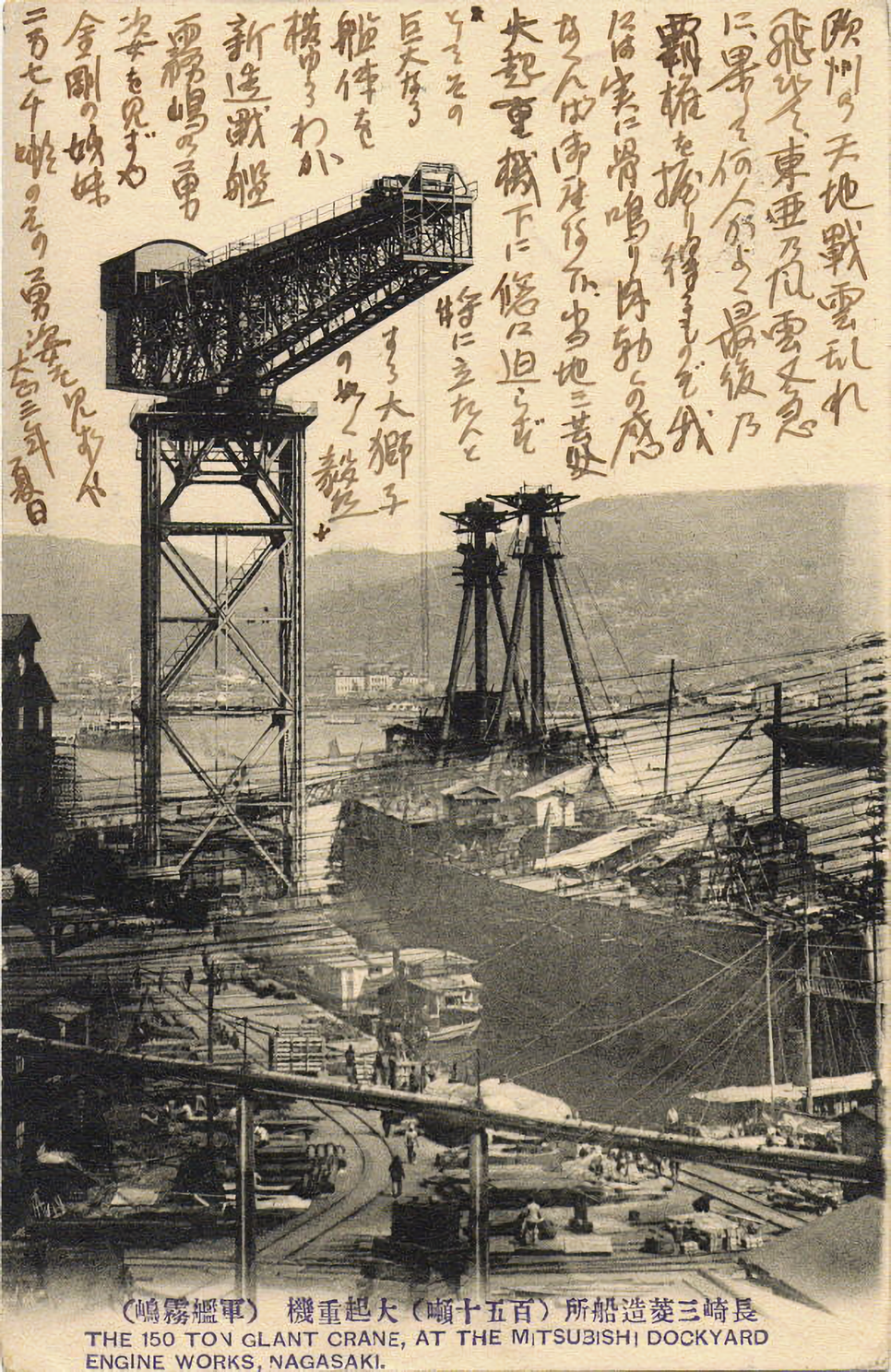
Kirishima under construction at a Mitsubishi dockyard in Nagasaki, 1914

The Kongō-class battlecruisers were designed by the British naval architect Sir George Thurston as an improved version of the British Lion-class battlecruiser, based on specifications provided by the IJN. They have been called the battlecruiser version of the British (formerly Turkish) battleship HMS Erin with their heavy armament and armor protection (which took up 23.3% of their approximately 30,000 ton displacement).

As built, the Kongōs had overall length of 214.6 meters (704 ft 1 in), a beam of 28 meters (91 ft 10 in) and a mean draft of 8.2 meters (26 ft 11 in). Kirishima displaced 26,739 metric tons (26,317 long tons) at normal load. Their crew numbered 1,221 officers and ratings.

Kirishima was powered by two steam turbine sets, built by Mitsubishi under license from Parsons. Each set was driving two propeller shafts using steam provided by 36 mixed-firing Yarrow boilers. The turbines were designed to produce 64,000 shaft horsepower (48,000 kW) which was intended give the Kongō-class ships a speed of 27.5 knots (50.9 km/h; 31.6 mph). Kirishima slightly exceeded that speed during her sea trials on 19 January 1915, reaching 27.55 knots (51.02 km/h; 31.70 mph) from 79,680 shp (59,420 kW). The ships carried 4,200 metric tons (4,100 long tons) of coal and 1,000 metric tons (980 long tons) of fuel oil which was sprayed on the coal to increase its temperature. This gave them a range of 8,000 nautical miles (15,000 km; 9,200 mi) at 14 knots (26 km/h; 16 mph).

=== Armament, protection and fire control ===
The main battery of the Kongōs consisted of eight Vikers 36-centimeter (14 in) 41st Year Type guns in four twin-turrets, one superfiring pair each fore and aft of the superstructure. Unlike the British turrets on which these were modeled, the shell rooms were above the powder rooms. The turrets were numbered 1 to 4 from the bow. Kongō's guns had a maximum elevation of 25 degrees, but those of her sisters were limited to 20 degrees. This gave Kirishima's guns a range of 22,500 meters (24,600 yd) with armor-piercing shells. Their secondary battery numbered sixteen 15-centimeter (6 in) 41st Year Type guns in single casemates, located amidships in the upper side of the hull. Their elevation was limited to 15 degrees with a range of 14,200 meters (15,500 yd). The anti-aircraft (AA) armament were composed of four 8-centimeter (3 in) 3rd Year Type guns on single mounts amidships. The ships were also equipped with eight submerged 53-centimeter (21 in) torpedo tubes, four on each broadside.

The waterline belt armor of the Kongō-class ships consisted of Krupp-cemented (KC) steel that had a maximum thickness of 203 millimeters (8.0 in) and tapered down to 76 millimeters (3.0 in) at the bottom. It extended between the No. 1 and No. 4 barbettes. Above it were two 152-millimeter thick strakes of KC armor that protected the casemate guns and ran between the No. 1 and No. 3 barbettes. Another strake of 76 millimeter KC armor extended forward to the bow and was the same height as the main belt. A similar strake of the same thickness ran to the stern, but was only half the height. The barbettes were protected by 254 millimeters (10 in) KC plates above the upper deck and 76-millimeter plates below. The face plates of the gun turrets were also 254 millimeters thick while the turret sides were 229 millimeters (9 in) thick. The turret roof was 76 millimeters thick. The exact thickness of the forward conning tower's sides is uncertain with figures of 229 millimeters and 254 millimeters being cited. Its roof thickness of 76 millimeters is not in disupte. (Note: Naval historian Hans Lengerer states that some sources say that the upper portion of the barbettes had 229 millimeters of armor and the turret sides were 254 millimeters thick.)

The lower edge of the belt armor was attached to the protective deck above the propulsion machinery and shell rooms. This consisted of 19 millimeters (0.75 in) of nickel steel, both on the flat and sloped portions of the deck. Also made from nickel steel were the plates of the middle (19 millimeter-) and upper (25-millimeter (1 in)) decks. Inboard of the side of the hull was a torpedo bulkhead that consisted of two layers of steel plates, 25 millimeters and 22 millimeters (0.87 in) thick respectively. Further protection against torpedoes when stationary was provided by torpedo nets suspended by booms hung off hull sides. When moving these were swing back along the hull. Plates 19 and 25 millimeters thick protected the steering compartment.

Kirishima was fitted with a variety of license-built rangefinder designs from the British company Barr & Stroud. A 3.5-meter (12 ft) FT 18 model was mounted on the roof of the conning tower and 4.5-meter (15 ft) FT 24 unit was installed in the roofs of No. 2 and No. 3 turrets (the unit located on No. 2 turret was on a rotating mount while that on No. 3 turret was fixed). A 2.5-meter (9 ft) FQ 2 rangefinder was positioned on top of the bridge. These rangefinders fed data to the license-built Dumaresq, Dreyer Table and range clock fire-control instruments that processed it and transmitted the aiming data to the gun turrets.

== Construction and career ==
Kirishima was named after Mount Kirishima in accordance with the Japanese ship-naming conventions. The class was ordered in November 1910 with the name ship of the class to built in Britain and the others in Japan with significant British aid. The ship was laid down on 17 March 1912 at Mitsubishi's shipyard in Nagasaki. Due to a shortage of available slipways, Kirishima and her sister Haruna were the first two capital ships of the IJN to be built in private shipyards. Kirishima was launched on 1 December 1913 and commissioned on 19 April 1915.

=== 1914–1927: Battlecruiser ===
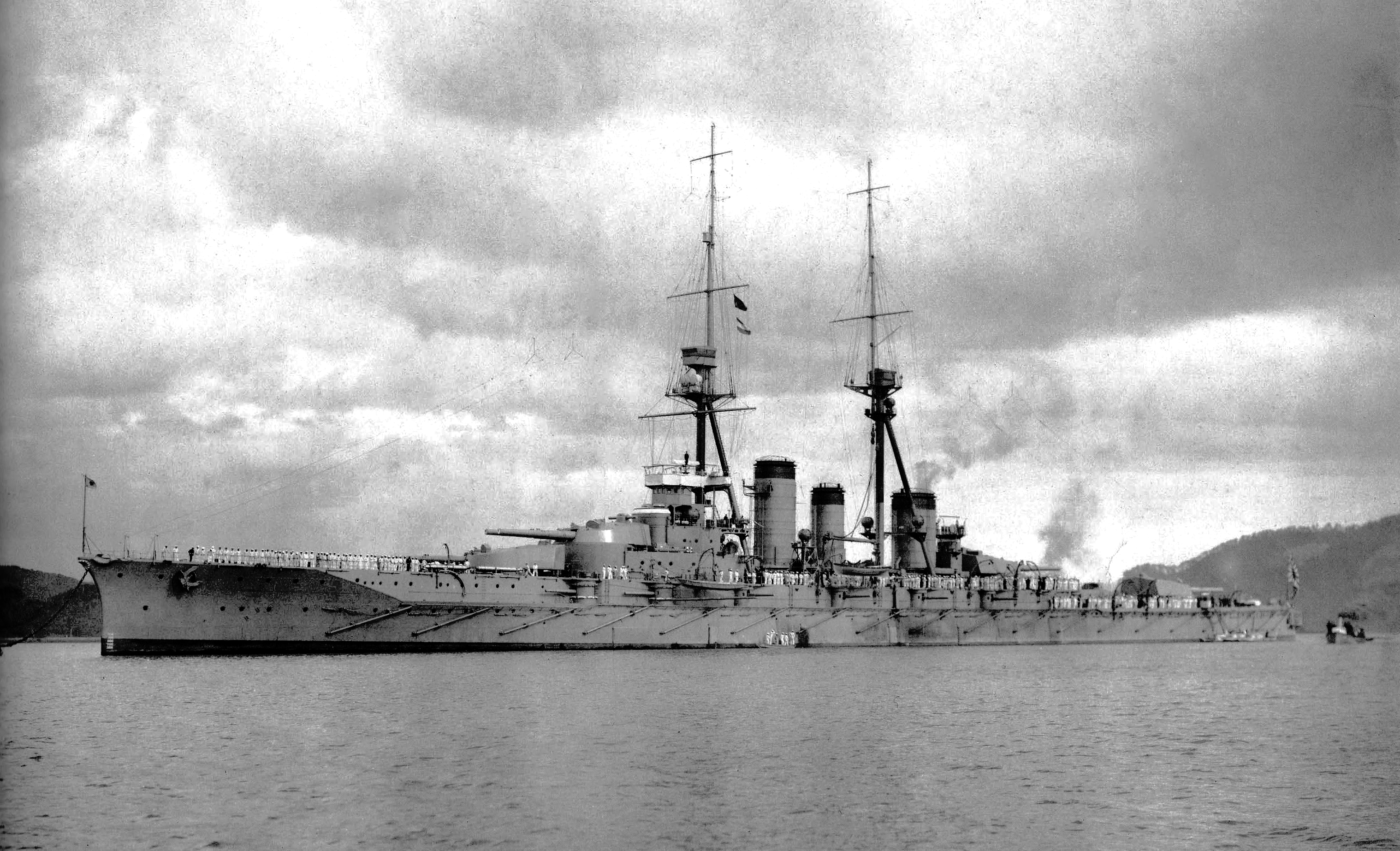
Kirishima moored at Sasebo in December 1915

The sisters were then assigned to the 1st Battleship Division of the First Fleet. After seven months of trials, she was reassigned to the 3rd Battleship Division of the Second Fleet, with Captain Shima Takeshi in overall command of the ship. In April 1916, Kirishima and Haruna departed Sasebo Naval Base to patrol the East China Sea for ten days. She remained in Sasebo until April 1917, when she again briefly deployed to the Chinese coast with her sisters Haruna and Kongō. Kirishima was drydocked in Sasebo Naval Arsenal on 1 June to have her hull repainted. The IJN took advantage of this to have a Type 13 fire-control director installed in the foremast spotting top for her main guns. Her last patrol operation of World War I was off the Chinese and Korean coast in April 1918. In July 1918, Kirishima acted as the transport of Prince Arthur of Connaught for his extended cruise to Canada, before returning to Japan. Later that year an auxiliary director that could control all the main guns was installed in Turret No. 2.

Following the end of World War I, the Japanese Empire gained control of former German possessions in the central Pacific per the terms of the Treaty of Versailles. Kirishima was placed in reserve on 1 December 1919 and began a refit that improved her magazine flooding arrangements to prevent an explosion there like the one that sank the battleship Kawachi in 1917. In addition a new 2.5-meter (8 ft 2 in) 5th Year Type rangefinder was mounted on the compass bridge. Still refitting, torpedo control positions were added to the forward superstructure in late 1920. On 1 December, she was reassigned to the Third Division of the Second Fleet. A Caquot kite balloon was installed around 4 May 1921. A fire in No. 1 boiler room occurred on 13 July that damaged the electrical wiring in the compartment. Together with her sister Kongō and the battleship Nagato, Kirishima patrolled off the Chinese coast in August. The Second Fleet was deactivated on 1 December and the ship was transferred to the Second Division of the First Fleet.

With the conclusion of World War I and the signing of the Washington Naval Treaty in 1922, the size of the Imperial Japanese Navy was significantly lessened, with a ratio of 5:5:3 required between the capital ships of the United Kingdom, the United States, and Japan. The treaty also banned Japan from building any new capital ships until 1931, with no capital ship permitted to exceed 35,562 metric tons (35,000 long tons). Provided that new additions did not exceed 3,048 metric tons (3,000 long tons), existing capital ships were permitted to be upgraded with improved torpedo bulges and thicker deck armor.

On 10 September, she collided with the destroyer Fuji practicing night torpedo attacks, with both ships sustaining minor damage. After repairs, Kirishima was transferred to the 4th Battle Division of the reactivated Second Fleet. On 18 February 1923, Kirishima and her sisters Hiei and Kongō, departed for maneuvers in the Marshall Islands. While entering Ulithi Atoll's lagoon on 3 March, the battlecruiser grazed a coral reef, ripping a lengthy 13 cm-gash (5.1 in) through her double bottom that flooded a boiler room and gave her a five-degree list to starboard. Emergency repairs took until 8 March and she arrived at Sasebo a week later for repairs that lasted until mid-April. Following the Great Kantō earthquake of September 1923, the ship assisted in rescue work until the end of October. She was placed in reserve on 1 December 1923 in preparation for a lengthy refit that commenced at the beginning of 1924. This included rebuilding the structures on the foremast to include a pair of 3.5-meter (11 ft) Type 14 high-angle rangefinders and additional fire-control equipment. Other changes included upgrading the torpedoes to the new 6th Year Type and increasing the elevation of the main guns to 33 degrees which increased their range to 28,600 meters (31,300 yd). (Note: Sources disagree on when the main-gun elevation was increased. Hans Lengerer states that it was done during her first modernization in 1927–1931.) The equipment for her kite balloon was removed in December.

The ship made two patrols off the Chinese coast in early 1925. Kirishima and Hiei cruised off the Chinese coast in March–April 1926. A fire was started in one of the forward torpedo rooms on 13 May when a sailor inadvertently ignited oil fumes at the opening of the bilge drain compartment. The sailor and one other man were injured during the fire. The ship was reduced to reserve on 1 December pending her modernization scheduled to begin the following year. Lengerer states that the number of 8 cm AA guns was increased from four to seven in 1926, but this is not mentioned by naval historians Joseph Low and Sander Kingsepp.

=== 1927–1934: Battleship ===
Stripped of the ability to construct new capital ships, the IJN instead opted to significantly upgrade and reconfigure their existing battleships and battlecruisers to improve their protection against plunging fire and underwater threats. Kirishima began her first reconstruction in early 1927. The 36 coal-fired boilers were removed and replaced with six large mixed-firing and four smaller oil-burning Kampon Ro-Go boilers. (Note: Sources disagree on the number of boilers. Naval historian Michael Whitley only states that Kirishima and Kongō received ten new boilers while the other pair received sixteen without any further details. Lengerer says that the Kongō-class ships received sixteen, divided between 10 mixed-firing units and six oil burners, contradicting the information in his book with co-author Lars Ahlberg that the ships, except for Haruna, received eight oil burners. Naval historian Ian Sturton seems to split the difference, giving all but Hiei ten boilers with the latter ship receiving sixteen.) This change allowed the forward funnel to be eliminated and the remaining boiler uptakes to be consolidated into a new and larger funnel amidships and a new, smaller, funnel for the aft boilers. This had the virtue of moving the new funnel further away from the forward superstructure and reducing its tendency to smoke it out. Coal capacity was reduced to 2,661 metric tons (2,619 long tons) and the ship's oil capacity was increased to 3,292 metric tons (3,240 long tons) by converting several former coal bunkers and other compartments into oil tanks. These changes increased Kirishima's range to 9,500 nmi (17,600 km; 10,900 mi), but decreased her speed to 26.3 knots (48.7 km/h; 30.3 mph).

The frontal armor of the Kongō-class ships' turrets was increased from 254 millimeters to 280 millimeters (11 in) and their roof armor was doubled by the addition of 76 millimeters of New Vickers Non-Cemented (NVNC) armor. 76 millimeters of KC armor was added to all of the barbettes and the 63-millimeter-thick (2.5 in) plates protecting the ammunition hoists in the forward turrets was increased to 139 millimeters (5.5 in). Turrets No. 2 and 3 had their rangefinders replaced by Barr & Stroud 8-meter (26 ft 3 in) duplex rangefinders while Turret No. 2 was fitted with an auxiliary gunnery director. Four of the submerged torpedo tubes were removed to save weight.

Kirishima's forward superstructure was reconstructed in the pagoda-mast style to accommodate the new and relocated fire-control equipment needed for the longer-range engagements that the IJN planned on. The Type 13 director was placed at the top of the superstructure and had an 8-meter Type 13 duplex rangefinder added to its roof in a rotating mount. The existing Type 14 rangefinders for the secondary guns were repositioned on the pagoda and new 4.5 meters (14 ft 9 in) rangefinders for the secondary guns were added low on the forward side of the superstructure. A 3.5-meter Barr & Stroud F.T. 18 auxiliary rangefinder was added to the aft compass bridge. The 3.5-meter high-angle rangfinders were replaced by a pair of 4.5-meter Barr & Stroud U.C. 4 models located on lattice towers, one on each broadside between the forward superstructure and the forward funnel. A pair of hydrophones were added in the ship's bow.

The existing 19 millimeters of nickel-steel armor over the propulsion machinery and magazines was strengthened: 76 millimeters of high-tensile steel (HTS) was added over the boiler compartments and 82–89 millimeters (3.2–3.5 in) of HTS over the turbine rooms. The forward magazines received 102 milleters (4 in) of NVNC armor on the flat part of the armor and 76 millimeters of HTS over the sloping portion while the aft magazines got 102–114 millimeters (4.0–4.5 in) of NVNC armor. The 44 millimeters of the rear portion of the armor deck had 76 millimeters of additional armor added. The vulnerability of the large openings in the armor deck for the boiler uptakes and the ventilation ducts to plunging fire caused the IJN to reinforce their coamings with 165 millimeters (6.5 in) of armor for the boiler uptakes, 178 millimeters (7 in) for the boiler-room ventilation shafts and 102–127 millimeters (4–5 in) for the engine-room ducts. Kirishima was also fitted with anti-torpedo bulges capable of resisting the explosion of a 200-kilogram (440 lb) warhead and a new torpedo bulkhead with a maximum thickness of 52 millimeters (2 in). The ineffective torpedo nets were also removed. The bulges increased the ship's beam to 31.02 meters (101 ft 9 in). The reconstruction of the Kongō-class battlecruisers added an additional 4,000 tons of armor to the ships, directly violating the terms of the Washington Treaty. On 16 April 1930, the reconstruction was declared complete. (Note: Sources disagree on the exact dates of the reconstruction. While naval historian Norman Friedman gives a beginning date of March 1927 and an end date of 31 March 1930, Kirishima's Combined Fleet Tabular Record of Movement states that it was from May 1927 to 16 April 1930. Lengerer agrees that it started in May, but gives an end date of 31 March, while Low and Kingsepp say that it began on 9 May with an official completion date of 16 April 1930, although the final work was not completed until 31 May.)

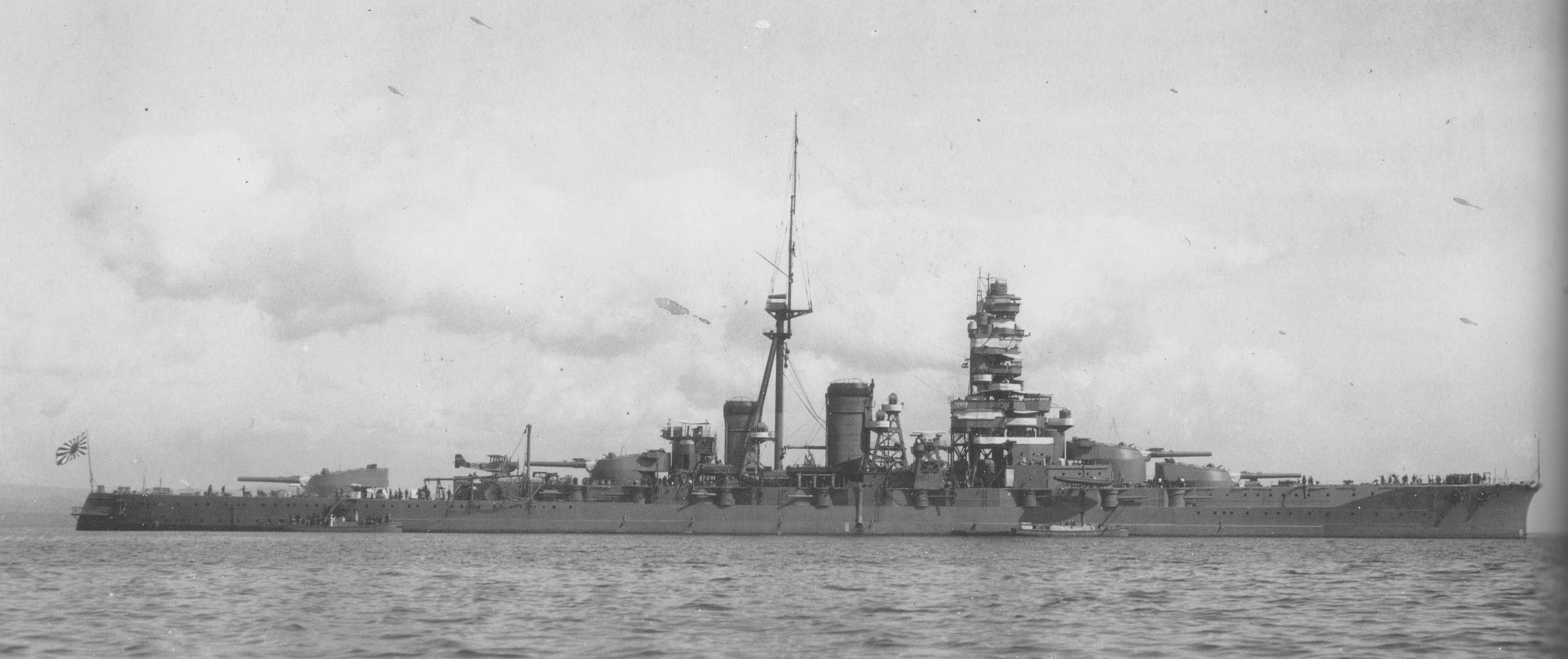
Kirishima anchored off Beppu following her first reconstruction, October 1932

Six days after Kirishima's reconstruction was completed, Japan pledged to scrap several battleships and signed the London Naval Treaty, which placed further bans on capital ship construction until 1937. From August to October 1930, she was outfitted with a derrick on the aft superstructure and the equipment necessary to handle reconnaissance seaplanes. She was initially equipped with a single Yokosuka E1Y3 Type 14 aircraft. The ship hosted Emperor Hirohito during the fleet maneuvers in October, the subsequent fleet review off Kobe, and the combined exercises of the Imperial Japanese Army and IJN in Okayama Prefecture in November. Kirishima was assigned to Battleship Division 1 of the First Fleet on 1 December and made her first training cruise since the modernization in March–April 1931 off the coast of Shandong Province, China. All of the Kongō-class battlecruisers were reclassified as battleships on 30 May. The ship patrolled the coast of China near Shanghai from 27 March to 5 April 1932, after the First Shanghai Incident. She began a refit on 25 November that saw the installation of six Type 94 Model 2 gunnery directors for the secondary armament. Four of these incorporated the existing rangefinders for those guns and the remaining pair were added to the rear control tower just forward of No. 3 turret. The 8 cm AA guns were removed and eight 40-caliber 12.7 cm Type 89 dual-purpose guns were fitted amidships in four twin-gun mounts. When firing at surface targets, the guns had a range of 14,700 meters (16,100 yd); they had a maximum ceiling of 9,440 meters (30,970 ft) at their maximum elevation of +90 degrees. Their maximum rate of fire was 14 rounds a minute, but their sustained rate of fire was around eight rounds per minute. Two twin-gun mounts for Vickers license-built two-pounder 40 millimetres (1.6 in)) light AA guns were also added to the ship. These guns had a maximum elevation of +85 degrees and had a maximum rate of fire of 200 rounds per minute. The aircraft-handling deck between the rear turrets was modified to accommodate a catapult and a total of three seaplanes, although only two Nakajima E4N2 Type 90-2-2s were initially assigned to Kirishima.

On 25 February 1933, based on a report by the Lytton Commission, the League of Nations agreed that Japan had violated Chinese sovereignty in its September 1931 invasion of Manchuria. Refusing to accept the organization's judgment, Japan withdrew from the League of Nations the same day. Immediately following, Japan also withdrew from the Washington and London Naval Treaties, thus removing all restrictions on the number and size of her capital ships.

Kirishima was assigned to the Red Fleet in May 1933 for the annual maneuvers scheduled for August near Truk. They were intended to replicate the conditions leading up to the decisive battle that the IJN planned for and were ended when the Red Fleet detected radio signals from the ships of the Blue Fleet. The battleship participated in the subsequent fleet review off Yokohama. She began another refit on 4 September that lasted until January 1934 and included the addition of a pair of Type 91 high-angle gunnery directors.

=== 1934–1941: Fast battleship ===
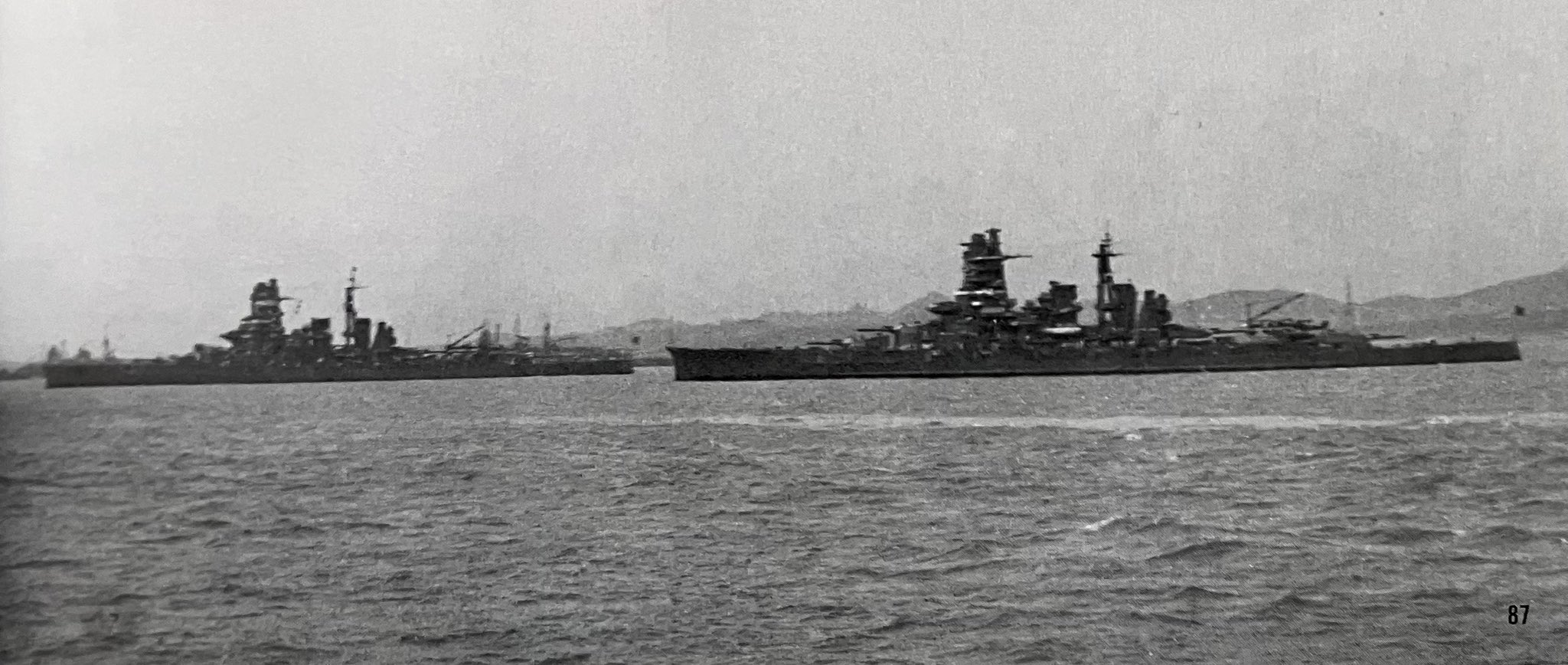
Kirishima and Kongō anchored off Qingdao, 26 March 1938

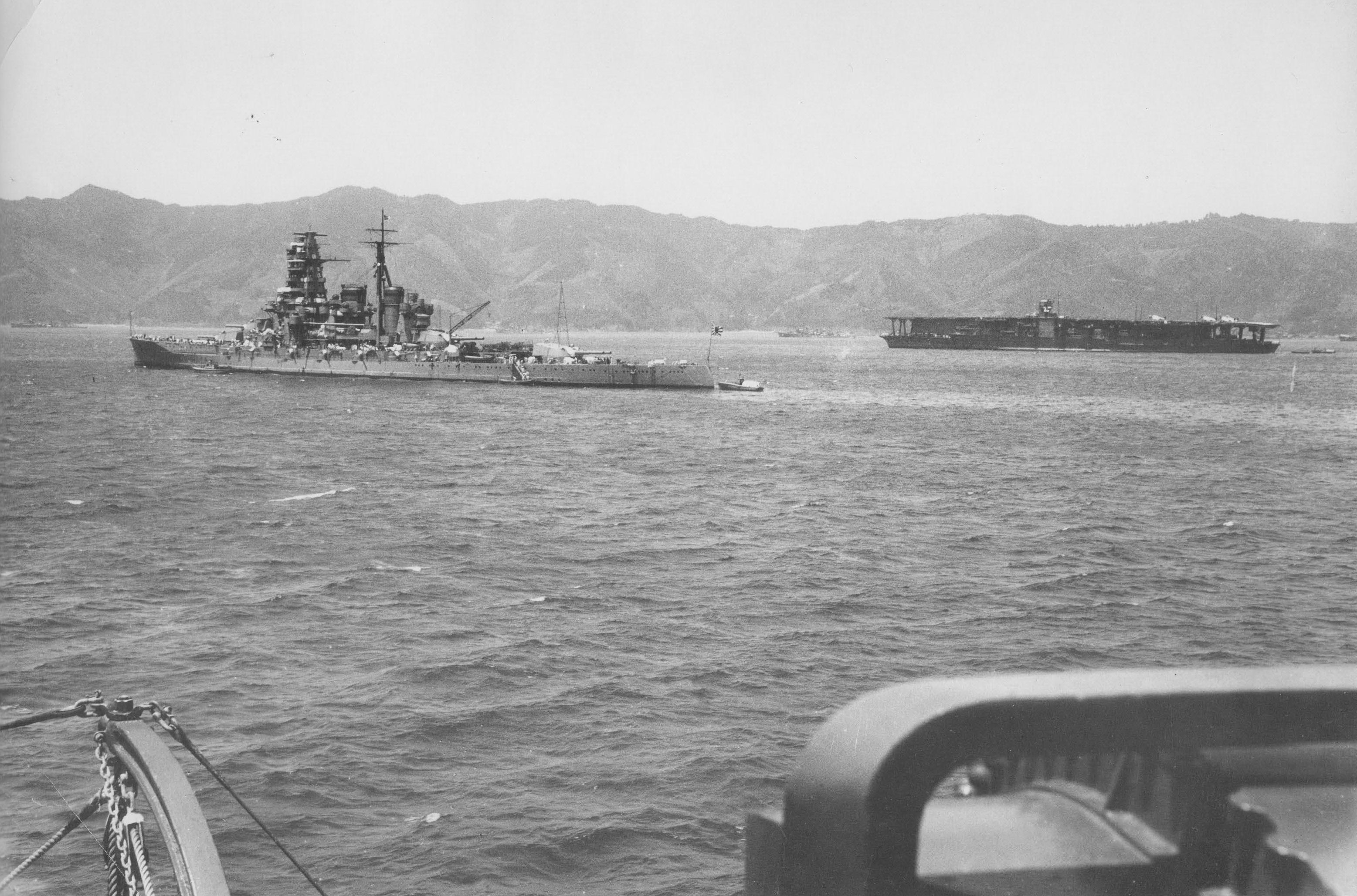
Kirishima, the aircraft carrier Akagi, and Destroyer Division 8 anchored in Sukumo Bay, April 1939

From 27 September to 5 October 1934, Kirishima, Kongō, and the battleship Hyūga made a short patrol off the Chinese coast. Three days later, she began had a brief refit at Sasebo to improve her magazine flooding arrangements. On 15 November, the battleship reduced to reserve and was drydocked in Sasebo three days later in preparation for her second reconstruction, which would convert her into a fast battleship with a speed of 30 knots (56 km/h; 35 mph). This was intended to enable her to destroy the heavy cruisers that the IJN would be screening the United States Navy's battleline during a night action before the decisive battle to allow the IJN's cruisers and destroyers to attack the battleline proper with torpedoes while the Kongō-class ships disengaged so they could participate in the follow-on daylight decisive battle.

Kirishima's stern was lengthened by 7.47 metres (24 ft 6 in) to reduce drag and to help offset some of the additional weight. Her boilers were replaced with eight new oil-fired Kampon boilers with superheaters identical to those used in the cruisers Kumano and Suzuya. The new geared turbines were the same ones used by the Mogami-class cruisers and the new boilers provided so much steam that the turbines were rated at 136,000 shp (101,000 kW), more than double the power of the old machinery. The two rudders were replaced by larger ones and the steering machinery was upgraded to handle the higher speed.

The elevation of her main guns was increased to 43 degrees which their extended their maximum to something over 35,000 meters (38,000 yd). The elevation of her casemate guns was increased from 15 to 30 degrees, which changed their range from 14,200 to 19,500 meters (15,500 to 21,300 yd). To save weight, the forward-most pair of 152-millimeter guns was removed and their casemates were plated over. The remaining torpedo tubes were also removed. The 40-millimeter AA guns were replaced by twenty 2.5-centimeter (1 in) Type 96 AA guns in twin-gun mounts on the forward superstructure and abreast the forward funnel.

Kirishima's pagoda mast was rebuilt to accommodate for new fire-control equipment. At the very top was a gyrostablilized 10-meter (32 ft 10 in) Type 94 duplex rangefinder. One level below it was a Type 94 gunnery director and below that were two of the secondary directors. The other pair of forward directors for the secondary guns and their rangefinders remained in place at the upper-bridge level. The aft control tower was entirely rebuilt and the auxiliary directors for the secondary guns were located atop it. The auxiliary main-gun director in No. 2 turret was removed.

The ship's aircraft handling equipment was upgraded as the derrick was replaced with a collapsible 4-metric-ton (3.9-long-ton) crane to handle a Kawanishi E7K "Alf" and two Nakajima E8N "Dave" reconnaissance floatplanes. The reconstruction was declared complete on 8 June 1936, although installation of the Type 96 guns was not completed for another week. Unwilling to add additional weight that would slow the ships down, the IJN rejected adding additional side armor, but inclining the existing armor was evaluated. The required structural work would still have added some weight and lengthened the time required for the modernization. Capable of speeds of up to 30.5 knots (56.5 km/h; 35.1 mph), Kirishima was reclassified as a fast battleship.

In August 1936, Kirishima departed Sasebo alongside Fusō to patrol the Chinese coast off Amoy. From March 1937 to April 1939, she was frequently deployed as a support vessel and troop transport during the Second Sino-Japanese War. In November 1938, Kirishima was designated the flagship of the Third Battleship Division, and was under the command of Rear Admiral Chuichi Nagumo. In November 1939, she was placed in reserve where improved intermediate-pressure turbines were fitted as was a Type 94 No. 1 fire-control computer for the secondary armament. The ship may have received a new catapult during this refit that ended on 15 November 1940.

=== Second World War ===
On 11 November 1941, after a series of transfers between Japanese naval bases, Kirishima was outfitted in preparation for coming hostilities and assigned—alongside her sister ships—to the Third Battleship Division. On 17 November, Kirishima along with Hiei departed Sasebo for Hitokappu Bay, in the Kurile Islands, where rendezvoused with the six Japanese aircraft carriers of the First Air Fleet Striking Force, also known as the Kido Butai, for a secret mission known only to the command staff of each ship. It was only after the fleet departed Hitokappu Bay on 26 November that her crew learned of the mission's intent, a surprise attack on Pearl Harbor that would begin the Pacific War. Kirishima would escort the aircraft carriers to their destination until 7 December when the attack began, before Kirshima escorted the carriers back to Japan where she arrived at Kure on 24 December. Three days later Kirishima was drydocked for maintenance and was undocked another three days later and departed Kure for Hashirajima.

On 8 January 1942, Kirishima departed Japan for Truk Naval Base in the Caroline Islands alongside the Carrier Strike Force. She provided escort during the invasion of New Britain on 17 January before returning to Truk. She sortied again in response to American carrier raids in the Marshall and Gilbert Islands at the start of February, before spending the next three weeks transiting between naval ports with her sister ships. On 21 February, Kirishima arrived at Staring Bay along with Kongō and Hiei to join the Kido Butai and their escorts for operations off Java in the Dutch East Indies, departing 4 days later.

==== Sinking of USS Edsall ====
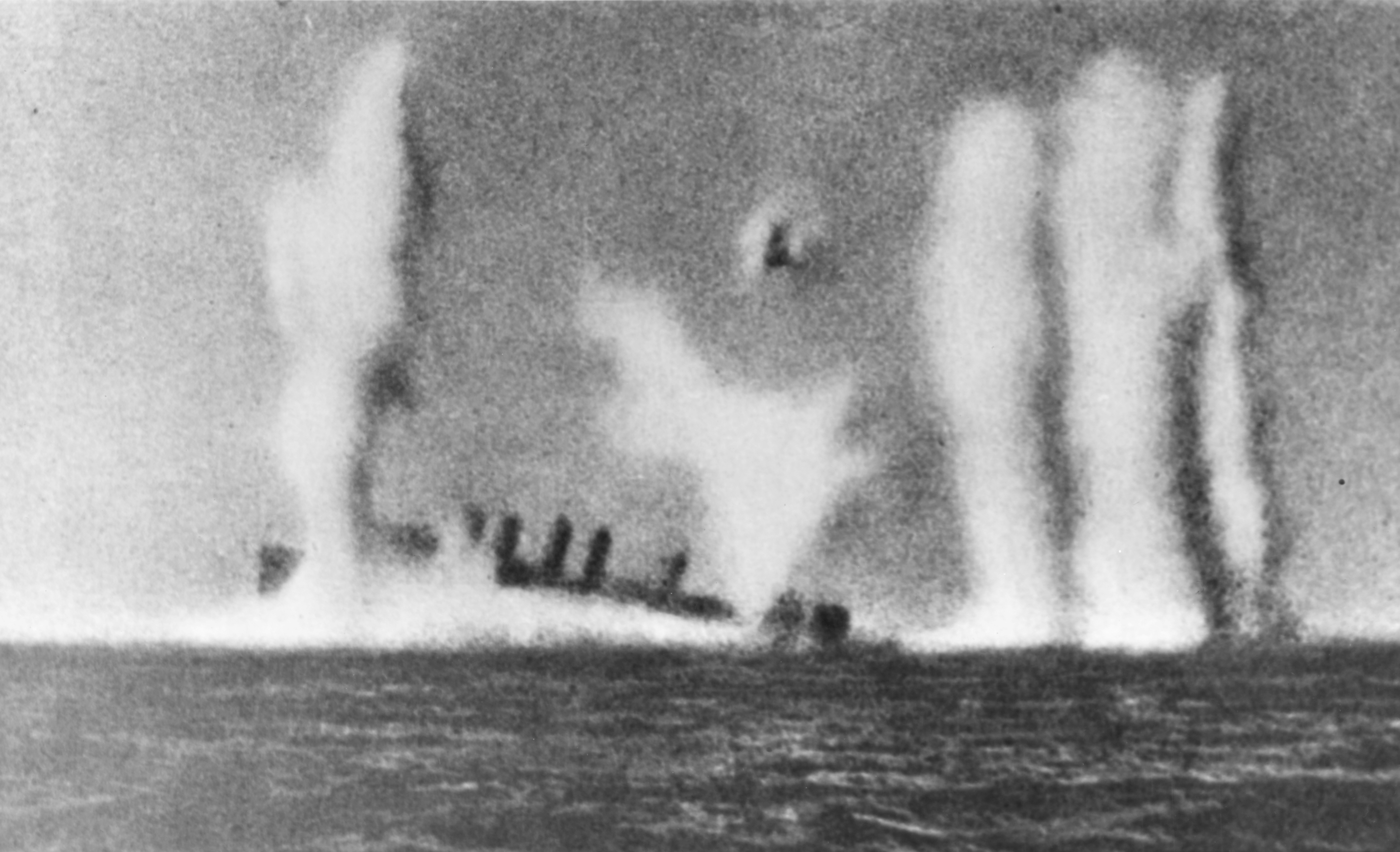
The sinking USS Edsall being lifted out of the water by a salvo from Kirishima, photographed from Tone

On 1 March 1942, one of Kirishima's floatplanes attempted to bomb an enemy merchant vessel. However, south of Java, the Japanese fleet was surprised by the appearance of the destroyer USS Edsall which was attempting to escape the Dutch East Indies for safety in Australia. Initially mistaking Edsall for an Omaha-class light cruiser, Kirishima joined Hiei and the heavy cruisers Tone and Chikuma in chasing the destroyer, but did not join Hiei and Chikuma in opening fire at 27,900 yards, which achieved several straddles but not a direct hit. However, dive bombers from Akagi, Sōryū, and Hiryū disabled Edsall and set her on fire with one hit and one near miss. Now correctly identifying Edsall as a destroyer, Kirishima finally opened fire with both her main and secondary battery at 19,400 yards shortly joined by Hiei, then Tone and Chikuma, and 13 minutes later Edsall succumbed to a hail of 14-inch, 8-inch, and 6-inch gunfire and sank with the loss of 196 men. During a 90-second film reel taken by Tone of Edsall sinking, a 14-inch shell hit from Kirishima lifted the destroyer out of the water. (Note: USS Edsall (DD-219) under fire and sinking, March 1, 1942 -Footage / 砲撃を受け沈没するUSSエドサル 1942年3月1日 A propaganda video showing 60 seconds of the footage of Edsall sinking. The famous still shot is not seen in this cut down version of the reel.)

On 5 March, Kirishima and Hiei were still patrolling off Java when they stumbled upon the Dutch patrol ship Hoofdinspecteur Zeeman, which had already been damaged by an air raid the previous day. Kirishima and Hiei opened fire and sank the patrol ship with ease. After another week of escorting the carrier fleet, during which the Dutch East Indies surrendered to Japan, Kirishima returned to Staring Bay on the 11th.

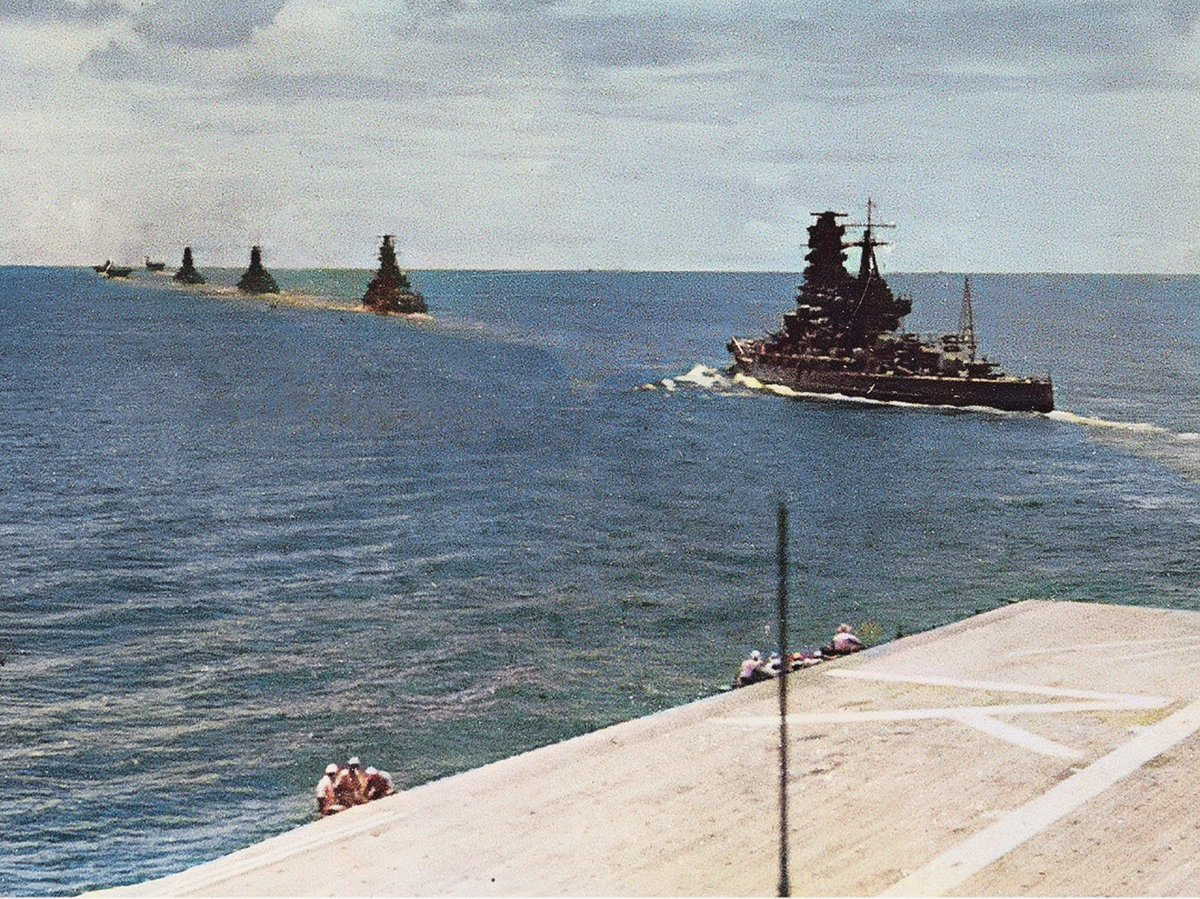
A view taken from the aircraft carrier Zuikaku, 30 March 1942. Kongō is closest to the camera, following Haruna, Kirishima, and Hiei.

In April 1942, Kirishima and the Third Battleship Division joined five fleet carriers and two cruisers in an attack against British naval bases in the Indian Ocean. On 5 April—Easter Sunday—the Japanese fleet attacked the harbor at Colombo in Ceylon, sinking the destroyer HMS Tenedos and the armed merchant cruiser HMS Hector, while seaplanes from Tone spotted the heavy cruisers HMS Cornwall and HMS Dorsetshire, both of which were later sunk by aerial attack. A floatplane from Kirishima also strafed a withdrawing oil tanker. On 8 April, Japanese carrier aircraft attacked the Royal Navy base at Trincomalee in Ceylon, only to find that all of Admiral James Somerville's remaining warships had withdrawn the previous night; they still sank the cargo ship SS Sagaing. Returning from the attack, a floatplane from Kirishima's sister ship Haruna spotted the aircraft carrier HMS Hermes and escorting destroyer HMAS Vampire, which were quickly sunk by a massive aerial attack. Upon returning to Japan, Kirishima was drydocked at Sasebo on 11 May and her secondary armament configuration modified with the addition of 25 mm antiaircraft guns in twin mounts.

==== Battle of Midway ====
On 27 May 1942, Kirishima departed Hashirajima to escort Admiral Nagumo's Carrier Strike Force for what became the Battle of Midway, providing escort for Akagi, Kaga, Sōryū, and Hiryū alongside Haruna. The battle began on 4 June as the carriers attacked Midway Island, and at 7:10, Kirishima was operating abreast of Akagi when the group was attacked by US Air Force B-26 bombers. Kirishima assisted Japanese fighters with her AA complement - including firing type 3 AA shells from her 14-inch guns - and helped to shoot down two bombers, one of which attempted to crash into Akagi's bridge before missing.

At 8:25, Kirishima continued to escort the carriers, sailing alongside the light cruiser Nagara, when the four ships were spotted by the periscope of the submarine USS Nautilus, with Kirishima appearing to spot the periscope and opening fire with her secondary battery. Nautilus fired two torpedoes from her bow tubes at Kirishima at a range of 4,500 yd (4,100 m), before diving away. One of the torpedoes malfunctioned, while Kirishima evaded the other by turning away to the south. Nautilus was then depth charged by Nagara and the destroyers, before the destroyer Arashi was left to pin the submarine down while the other ships continued with the carriers. After failing to sink Nautilus, Arashi resumed course to rejoin the fleet, and was spotted by two squadrons of aircraft from USS Enterprise allowing them to find the Japanese carriers. Between 10:22 to 10:30, dive bombers from Enterprise fatally wounded Akagi and Kaga, while dive bombers from USS Yorktown mangled Sōryū.

Later that day, dive bombers from Enterprise succeeded in bombing Hiryū beyond saving, and result in the last Japanese aircraft carrier being scuttled like her fallen companions. When attempts to save Hiryū were being undertaken, Kirishima was ordered to sail to her location and tow the crippled aircraft carrier. When arriving to Hiryū's position, the burning carrier illuminated Kirishima and put her at threat of submarine attacks, which contributed to the decision to finally abandon Hiryū. Kirishima instead only took on many of Hiryū's over 900 survivors from Destroyer Division 10's Yūgumo, Makigumo and Kazagumo. Kirishima returned to Hashirajima on 14 June.

==== Guadalcanal Campaign ====
Kirishima sailed to Kure on 9 July where she received AA upgrades and new floatplanes, before escorting Shōkaku and Zuikaku to Truk, but on the 20th the route was cancelled as the fleet refueled from oilers before sailing to Guadalcanal to counterattack American carrier operations. This would culminate in the battle of the Eastern Solomons on 24 August in which Shōkaku and Zuikaku dueled the aircraft carriers Enterprise and USS Saratoga. They crippled Enterprise with three bomb hits but in turn Saratoga aircraft sank the detached light carrier Ryūjō while land-based aircraft sank the destroyer Mutsuki and the troop transport Kinryu Maru. The main fleet came under light attacks first by a scout plane from Enterprise then by B-17 bombers, lightly damaging Shōkaku with near misses but achieving nothing else, with Kirishima seeing little action during the engagement. A four-day journey saw Kirishima travel with the fleet to Truk, where Kirishima remained on guard duty outside the naval base for another two days until being allowed to retire, refueling from the fleet oiler Tatekawa Maru. From 10 to 23 September, Kirishima joined Kongō and Haruna to escort the fleet on patrol duty in the Solomon Islands, then underwent maintenance and guard duty.

On 11 October, Kirishima departed Truk as part of the escort for the aircraft carriers Shōkaku, Zuikaku, and Jun'yō and the light carrier Zuihō on another attempt to lure American carriers into battle and sink them. From the 12th to 15th, Kirishima and Hiei took a detour as distant cover for Kongō and Haruna's bombardment of Henderson field, and then for the bombardment conducted by the heavy cruisers Chōkai and Kinugasa, before returning to the main fleet. During their absence, planes from Zuikaku sank the destroyer USS Meredith. On the 25th, a Catalina flying boat spotted the Japanese fleet, but Kirishima's floatplane badly damaged the American aircraft and chased it off. Later that day a flight of six B-17s attacked Kirishima but failed to inflict damage. The next day saw the aircraft carriers Enterprise and Hornet face the Japanese ships, badly damaging Shōkaku and the heavy cruiser Chikuma with bomb hits but failing to score any sinkings as Kirishima let loose with her AA defense against the American planes. Kirishima was attacked by three SBD dive bombers but not hit. In turn, Japanese aircraft left Hornet on the edge of sinking, until the destroyers Akigumo and Makigumo finished the carrier off 12 hours later. Japanese aircraft also sank the destroyer USS Porter, and badly damaged several other American ships, ending the battle in a Japanese victory as Kirishima returned to Truk on 30 October.

==== First Naval Battle of Guadalcanal ====
On 9 November 1942, Kirishima departed Truk alongside Hiei and eleven destroyers in preparation for a second bombardment mission on Henderson Field, a former Japanese air base which had been captured by the Americans and used against Japanese shipping to great effect. The previous bombardment by Kongō and Haruna is considered the most successful Japanese battleship action of the war but was not enough to capture the airfield just yet so Kirishima and Hiei were to enact the same plan yet again. They would sail with the light cruiser Nagara and 11 destroyers as escorts. They sailed smoothly for the first days of their journey, but rain squalls broke up the destroyer formation and left them operating in small clusters. However, by 1:25 on the 13th, signs of enemy ships began to appear. As it turned out, the force was spotted by US Navy reconnaissance aircraft several days in advance. The US deployed a force of two heavy cruisers, three light cruisers and eight destroyers under the command of Rear Admiral Daniel J. Callaghan to meet the Japanese force in Ironbottom Sound, and at the exact moment the Japanese spotted the American ships, the light cruiser USS Helena located the Japanese ships on radar at 27,000 yards. Over the next 25 minutes, both fleets closed to point blank range. At 1:50, Hiei and the destroyer Akatsuki ignited their searchlights and illuminated the light cruiser USS Atlanta. American ships then sank Akatsuki with a hail of gunfire while Hiei engaged Atlanta with her 14-inch and 6-inch guns before the cruiser was torpedoed by the destroyer Ikazuchi and sank hours later, opening up the first naval battle of Guadalcanal. However, Kirishima and Hiei were loaded with type 3 AA shells in their main guns, which carried limited effectiveness in damaging enemy ships; handicapping them for the duration of the battle.

Just before 2:00, Kirishima and Hiei trained their guns on the Allied flagship, the heavy cruiser USS San Francisco and entered a gunnery duel at 2,500 yards. Kirishima was only hit by one 8-inch shell as the cruiser focused most of her fire on Hiei, but they crippled San Francisco with at least twelve 14-inch shell hits, alongside nearly forty 5-inch and 6-inch shell hits from their secondary batteries and escorting destroyers. The damage destroyed or disabled all of her guns besides 5-inch mount number 8, wrecked her steering and engine control, destroyed all communication equipment, set San Francisco ablaze, and deformed the ship so badly she was not even recognizable as an enemy cruiser to the crew of the destroyer Amatsukaze until her searchlights were ignited. A 14-inch (356 mm) hit to the navigation bridge in particular succeeded in killing Admiral Callaghan, Captain Cassin Young, and most of the ship's command staff, with 86 sailors killed in total. San Francisco limped away from the battle while still being pestered by gunfire from the destroyer Amatsukaze as Kirishima ceased fire. Had Kirishima and Hiei been loaded with proper anti-shipping rounds for their main guns instead of type 3 shells, they probably would have sunk San Francisco. Instead, the mangled heavy cruiser remained out of commission until February 1943.

Helena soon came to San Francisco's defense, which resulted in Kirishima turning her guns on her. Kirishima hit the light cruiser with five 14-inch (356 mm) shells that caused negligible damage and killed one sailor. Just after 2:00, Kirishima was credited with a pair of 14-inch shell hits to the destroyer USS Laffey, (although anecdotally Hiei was widely believed to have caused this damage) one shell struck the bridge, with the other hitting the superstructure amidships causing some minor damage. A torpedo from destroyer Yukikaze provided the knockout blow as Laffey would sink at around 2:15. Kirishima then more verifiably attacked the destroyer USS Aaron Ward and landed three 14-inch shells, two 6-inch shells, and four 5-inch shells to Aaron Ward above the waterline that destroyed her gunnery director, disabled steering control, and caused her to lose speed until going dead in the water at 2:35, killing 15 men and wounding 57.

During the gunfight with San Francisco Hiei was hit by seventeen 8-inch shells, two of which disabled her steering gear, severely crippling the ship. Kirishima and the escorting destroyers attempted to assist Hiei - with Kirishima taking her sister ship under tow - but by daybreak the fleet was attacked by aircraft from Henderson Field and the carrier Enterprise, with Hiei absorbing another eight bombs and six torpedoes prompting the destroyers Yukikaze and Teruzuki of Abe's force and the nearby destroyers Shigure, Ariake, and Yūgure to evacuate Hiei's crew before leaving her to sink.

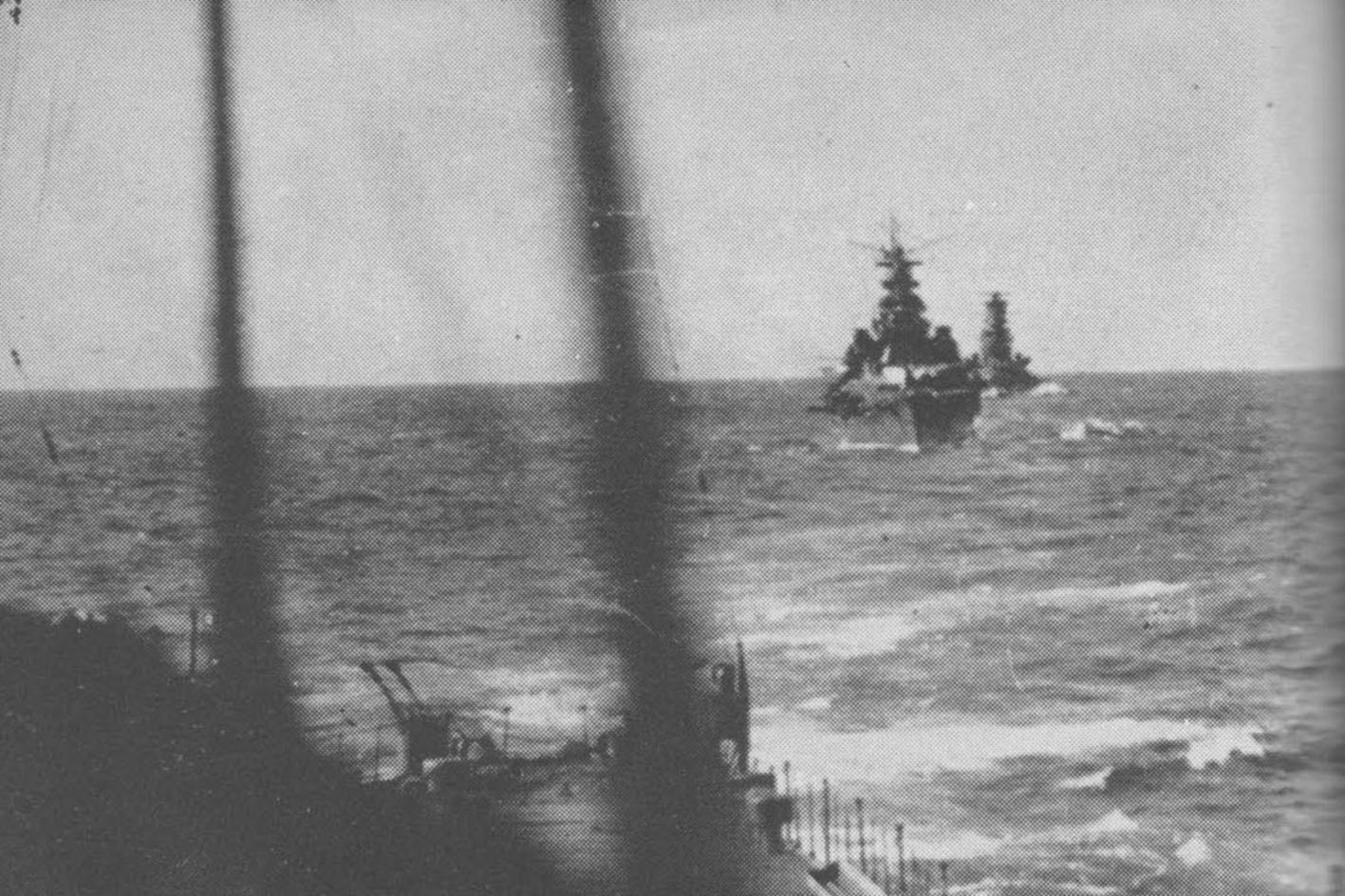
Kirishima following the heavy cruisers Takao and Atago in-between the first and second naval battles of Guadalcanal, 14 November 1942

After the battle, Kirishima rendezvoused with the distant cover fleet north of Guadalcanal, and later that night detached to continue the mission under the command of Admiral Kondō, escorted by the heavy cruisers Takao and Atago, the light cruisers Nagara and Sendai, and nine destroyers. By 7:39 the submarine USS Trout stumbled upon the force and was initially unable to gain an attack formation as the fleet sailed on. However, later that afternoon at 15:18 Trout located the fleet again and managed to unleash five torpedoes, her target was Kirishima. One torpedo hit Kirishima but turned out to be a dud, inflicting no damage. Another torpedo passed under a destroyer before nearly hitting Atago, but just barely missing. At 20:48, Kirishima was notified a floatplane spotted an American formation consisting of two cruisers and four destroyers heading north at 25 knots, and Admiral Kondō anticipated a surface action under the assumption his force would demolish the enemy ships, as his escorts alone were significantly superior to the formation described in the report, yet alone the addition of a Kongō-class battleship. However, the report was correct about the four destroyers - USS Walke, Preston, Benham, and Gwin - but the two "cruisers" were actually the battleships Washington and South Dakota, both of which were among the newest of the US battleships and far more capable than Kirishima.

==== Second Naval Battle of Guadalcanal ====
The battle began after 00:05 on 15 November 1942 when Washington detected the Japanese fleet on radar at 19,600 yards, followed immediately by the destroyer Uranami spotting the American warships. At 18,500 yards, Washington and South Dakota fired the first shots at Sendai and her immediate destroyers, scoring a few straddles but failing to inflict real damage. However, the Japanese scored first blood when Nagara and five destroyers neutralized the American destroyers. Walke was blown in half by a torpedo from the destroyer Samidare and sank within ten minutes; while Preston was hit simultaneously by three 5.5-inch shells from Nagara, which detonated her aft magazines, and also by a torpedo from the destroyer Ayanami, which sank her rapidly. Benham was fatally wounded by a torpedo, probably from the destroyer Shirayuki, and she sank not long after the battle; Gwin was badly damaged by gunfire from Ayanami, which eliminated the last of Washington's and South Dakota's escorts. In exchange, Washington sank Ayanami with long range gunfire.

At 0:44, South Dakota suffered a power outage which briefly disabled the ship; it took a full two minutes for her radar to be restored, and only by relying on their secondary battery fire control did South Dakota begin to track Nagara and Sendai at 7,000 yards. The battleship fired three salvos from her 16-inch guns, with no hits scored. Nagara in turn recognized South Dakota as an enemy battleship and reported to Admiral Kondō aboard Kirishima before turning to engage the Americans. At 00:52 South Dakota presented a perfect broadside as Kirishima opened fire at 11,000 yards and scored two first salvo hits; one was a 6-inch shell that hit a 28 mm AA mount on the forward deck and the other was a 14-inch shell which exploded in South Dakota's bow. Takao, Atago, Nagara, and Sendai joined Kirishima in clobbering South Dakota, and the battleship took at least 27 shell hits, including six 14-inch shells and eight 6-inch shells from Kirishima, seven 8-inch shells and two 5-inch shells from Takao and Atago, and four 5.5-inch shells from Nagara and Sendai. The damage destroyed or disabled South Dakota's radar, directors, fire control instruments, and electrical circuits, blasted holes in the superstructure and ignited at least 28 fires, and caused minor flooding damage, killing over 40 men and wounding 180 others. Captain Gatch only survived due to the armored conning tower. (Note: USS South Dakota's damage report recorded the ship was hit by one 14-inch shell, six 6-inch shells, seventeen 8-inch shells, and one 5-inch shell, but corrections by naval historian Robert Lundgren proved this claim to be false)

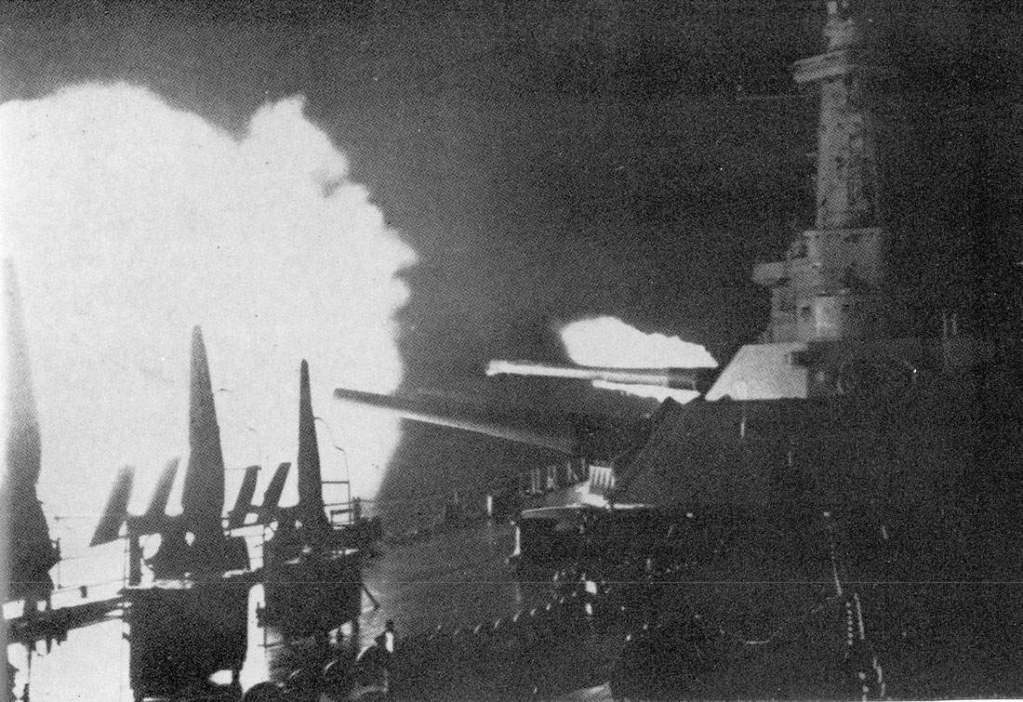
USS Washington sinking Kirishima with her 16-inch guns at a distance of 8,400 yards (7,700 meters)

However, Washington remained undetected and began to track Kirishima, Takao, and Atago with her main battery. Washington began to close the range when Atago noticed another enemy battleship off starboard. At 1:00, Captain Ijuin ordered "stand by for a gun and torpedo action to starboard," but it was too late. At that moment, at a distance of 8,400 yards (7,700 m), Washington fired a full broadside of nine 16-inch guns and immediately straddled Kirishima, which proceeded to continue firing on South Dakota. Washington's second salvo then scored a 16-inch shell hit to Kirishima's compass bridge, and her third salvo scored several 16-inch hits to Kirishima's amidships, which detonated her secondary-battery magazines and shredded her torpedo-defense system. Kirishima incorrectly identified Washington as an "Idaho-class battleship" which was washed up to her deck and sinking by the bow, only for the supposedly sinking Washington to hit Kirishima with another two 16-inch shells below the waterline. Kirishima's World War I design was not designed to handle World War II era deep penetration shells, and these two hits in particular cracked and mangled Kirishima's interior above and below the waterline. Meanwhile, Washington hit Kirishima with several 5-inch shells from her secondary guns to her forward funnel and surrounding superstructure.

Sixteen-inch shells then destroyed Kirishima's 14-inch gun turret 1, forcing the crew to flood its magazines, and holed her bow above and below the waterline before penetrating her stern above the waterline, while 5-inch shells detonated in her aft funnel and director. Two more 16-inch shells then hit the battleship's stern below the waterline, one destroying her steering gear and the other detonating inside her 14-inch gun turret 4 hydraulic pump room and disabling turrets 3 and 4. Another salvo of 16-inch shells from Washington set fire to the 14-inch turret 2 magazines and forced them to be flooded as well, and at least six 5-inch shells hit the pagoda mast and set it ablaze. Washington's final salvo landed a pair of waterline hits, one penetrating her belt and exploding inside one of Kirishima's three hydraulic pump rooms, while the last 16-inch shell hit and destroyed Kirishima's twin rudders. In total, Kirishima was hit by at least twenty 16-inch shells and seventeen 5-inch shells from Washington. (Note: The number of actual hits is a matter of conjecture. USS Washington observed eight main battery hits, while the US Strategic Bombing Survey estimated nine major caliber and 40 secondary battery hits based on one postwar interview with a junior officer. Kirishima's damage control officer identified twenty main battery hits and seventeen 5-inch hits on a schematic drawing, including several underwater hits which would have been invisible to Washington, and examination of the wreck has confirmed the location of three of these underwater hits, lending credence to his account.)

Listing at 18 degrees to starboard, Kirishima's engines remained relatively untouched by gunfire as the crippled battleship attempted to sail away from the battlefield. Takao and Atago fended off Washington with gunfire and torpedoes while Kirishima escaped. Attempts were made to steer the ship using the propellers, but this failed as extreme heat overtook her machinery and killed most of her engineers, rendering the engine room extremely hazardous as Kirishima waddled to safety. Nagara was ordered to tow Kirishima, but this order was refused. In the meantime, fires previously thought to have been put under control strengthened and spread to the aft magazines and forced them to be flooded. Natural flooding reversed the worsening list to port then back to starboard, until seawater reached and disabled Kirishima's starboard boilers. Captain Ijuin concluded the ship was fatally damaged by that point and ordered the port boilers shut down to allow the crew to evacuate. The destroyers Teruzuki, Asagumo, and Samidare came alongside Kirishima to rescue survivors. Ijuin's choice to abandon Kirishima proved to be the correct path as mere minutes later at 3:25, she finally lost buoyancy and suddenly capsized to starboard. Kirishima's superstructure almost crushed Teruzuki as she went down and took 212 men with her, while the remaining 300 men aboard Kirishima - including Captain Ijuin - were thrown overboard by the sudden sinking before Samidare rescued them. The three destroyers rescued 1,100 sailors.

Kirishima's wreck was discovered by Robert Ballard during an expedition to map the wrecks from the Battle of Guadalcanal in 1992, but a technical emergency caused Ballard's investigation of the wreck to be aborted, with only a small portion of the wreckage imaged. A further expedition to the wreck by Paul Allen's RV Petrel in January 2019 provided more extensive imaging. The remains of the ship lie upside down, with the bow section missing from the bridge forward due to a magazine explosion as the wreck was falling to the sea bed. The ship's forward anchor chain is wrapped around her stern section.
