= HNLMS Tydeman (1916) =

Royal Netherlands Navy Auxiliary

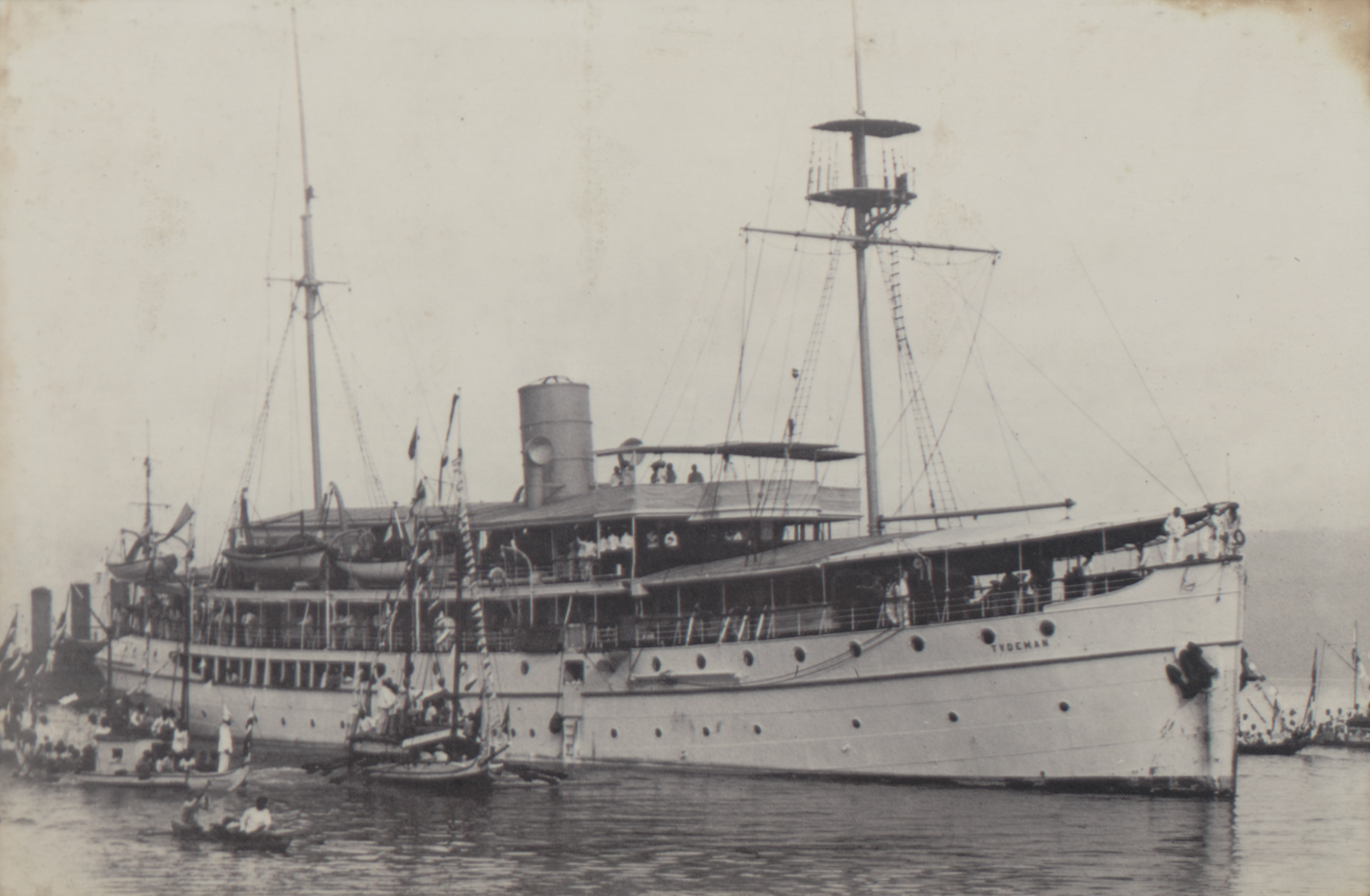
- HNLMS Tydeman

History

Netherlands
- Name: Tydeman
- Namesake: Gustaaf Frederik Tydeman
- Builder: Marine Etablissement, Surabaya
- Launched: 24 July 1916
- Commissioned: 1918 Governments Navy; 1939 Royal Netherlands Navy
- Out of service: 4 March 1942
- Fate: Sunk by near misses from Japanese bombardments on Tjilatjap

General characteristics
- Type: Auxiliary, hydrographic survey ship
- Displacement: 1,160 t (1,140 long tons) standard
- Length: 69 m (226 ft 5 in)
- Beam: 10 m (32 ft 10 in)
- Draught: 3.6 m (11 ft 10 in)
- Installed power: 700 hp (520 kW)
- Propulsion: 2 × Werkspoor Diesel Engine
- Speed: 10 knots (19 km/h; 12 mph)
- Complement: 104
- Armament: 2 × 37 mm (1.5 in) cannons

HNLMS Tydeman was a hydrographic survey vessel created for service with the Government Navy in the Dutch East Indies. The ship was named after Gustaaf Frederik Tydeman, a famous Surinam-born Dutch admiral known for his scientific achievements in hydrographic research.

Tydeman was militarized by the Royal Netherlands Navy upon the outbreak of World War II.

== Service history ==
HNLMS Tydeman served as a hydrographic survey vessel with the Government Navy. The ship was commissioned at a crucial time for mapping out the ocean streams, ocean floors and surfaces in the Dutch East Indies. It would be joined in this effort in 1928 by the newer vessel HNLMS Willebrord Snellius.

The Royal Netherlands Navy militarized the vessel after war broke out in Europe in 1939, however the ship would not see much action as her machinery was outdated and in a bad state. To that end, two new Enterprise Diesel engines were ordered and delivered that would see her speed increase to around 14 knots (26 km/h; 16 mph). The engines would never be installed due to the outbreak of war in the Pacific.

Tydeman was sunk on 4 March 1942 due to near-misses from Japanese bombardments on Tjilatjap harbor. The ship was raised by Japanese forces on 25 March 1944 and towed to Tandjong Priok where it was renamed to Choijo. The upper deck behind the bridge would be removed and a tripod mast would be installed on this location. It will never be known what function the ship would have served in the Imperial Japanese Navy as repairs had not been completed when World War II ended. After the war's end, the ship's condition was considered too deteriorated to be repaired and it was sunk once more, this time serving as a target ship for the cruiser HNLMS Jacob van Heemskerck on 24 April 1946.
