= Bellatrix-class patrol ship =

Dutch ship class

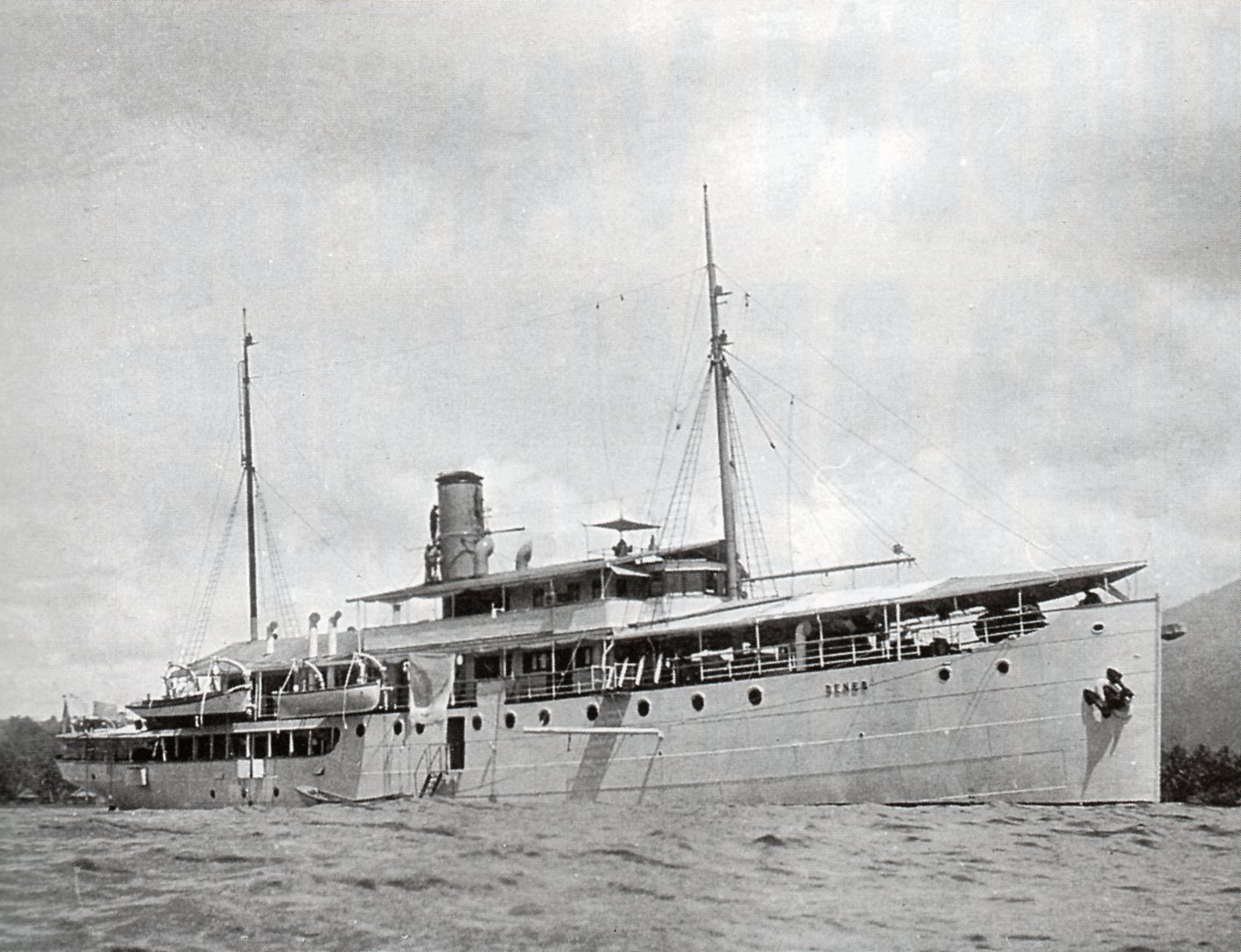
- HNLMS Deneb before militarization

Class overview
- Name: Bellatrix class
- Builders: Rijkswerf, Amsterdam
- Operators: Royal Netherlands Navy
- Preceded by: HNLMS Aldebaran
- Succeeded by: HNLMS Gemma
- In service: 1915–1942
- Planned: 3
- Completed: 3
- Lost: 3

General characteristics
- Type: Patrol ship, seaplane tender
- Displacement: 820 tons
- Length: 53.4 m (175 ft 2 in)
- Beam: 9 m (29 ft 6 in)
- Draught: 3 m (9 ft 10 in)
- Propulsion: 1 × 820 ihp (610 kW) triple expansion engine
- Speed: 12 knots (22 km/h; 14 mph)
- Complement: 45
- Armament: 1 × 7.5 cm (3.0 in) cannon (Bellatrix and Canopus); 2 x 37 mm (1.5 in) machine gun (Deneb)

The Bellatrix class was a class of three patrol boats built by the Rijkswerk in Amsterdam for service with the Government Navy. The class consisted of HNLMS Bellatrix, HNLMS Canopus and HNLMS Deneb.

== Construction ==
| Name | Laid Down | Commissioned | Fate |
|---|---|---|---|
| Bellatrix | 1914 | 18 May 1915 | Scuttled by crew 1 March 1942 |
| Canopus | 1915 | 1 January 1916 | Sunk on 5 March 1942 after being bombed by Japanese aircraft |
| Deneb | 1915 | 10 July 1916 | Sunk 4 February 1942 after ten bomb hits from Japanese bombers |

== Service history ==
The Bellatrix class were originally constructed as patrol ships for the Government Navy in the Dutch East Indies. Upon the outbreak of the Second World War, these ships were militarized and commissioned into the Royal Netherlands Navy. HNLMS Bellatrix and HNLMS Canopus had their machine guns replaced by a single 7.5 cm cannon during this militarization.

Bellatrix patrolled around Java and Bali until the fall of Java forced her crew to scuttle her due to being unable to escape. Canopus was stationed as patrol ship in Dutch Timor and took partin in the Allied invasion of Portuguese Timor together with HNLMS Soerabaya. Canopus transported negotiation officers in an effort to get Portuguese Timor to accept the Allied troops, however, the set time limit passed without answer causing Soerabaya to move in and start debarking troops while threatening to use its 12-inch guns if challenged. Canopus continued to serve as a patrol ship and seaplane tender around the island of Timor until the Japanese landed and its defences became impossible. Canopus then retreated to Tjilatjap. On 5 March 1942 Canopus was hit by Japanese bomber aircraft and sank. HNLMS Deneb' did not receive a 7.5 cm gun and retained two 3.7 cm machine guns which were unable to provide anti-aircraft fire. This contributed to her demise while patrolling around Sumatra on 4 February 1942 when she encountered seven Japanese twin-engine bombers. Suffering ten bomb hits, the ship sank with the loss of three lives and twenty heavily wounded crewmembers.
