= HNLMS Bangkalan =

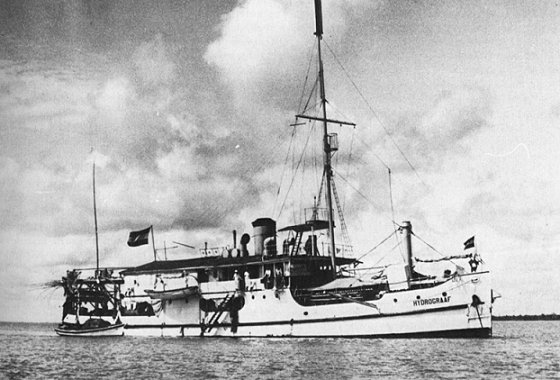
- HNLMS Bangkalan

History

Netherlands
- Name: Bangkalan
- Builder: Nederlands-Indische Scheepsbouw en Kustvaart Maatschappij, Lasem
- Laid down: 25 August 1927
- Launched: 1927
- Commissioned: 16 February 1942
- Out of service: 2 March 1942
- Namesake: Bangkalan
- Fate: Scuttled by own crew

General characteristics
- Type: Minelayer
- Displacement: 397 t (391 long tons) standard
- Length: 43 m (141 ft 1 in)
- Beam: 7.5 m (24 ft 7 in)
- Draught: 3 m (9 ft 10 in)
- Installed power: 360 hp (270 kW)
- Propulsion: 1 × Triple expansion
- Speed: 10 knots (19 km/h; 12 mph)
- Complement: 26
- Armament: 1 × 7.5 cm (3.0 in) cannon; 2 x 12.7 mm (0.50 in) machine gun; 30 Mines

HNLMS Bangkalan was originally the tug Willem van Braam serving the Government Navy. She would be renamed to Hydrograaf in the late 1920s or early 1930s after which she would serve as an ocean research vessel. She would be renamed again in 1935 to Bangkalan and be militarized in 1939 by the Government Navy itself. She would be commandeered by the Royal Netherlands Navy upon the start of the Pacific theatre of World War II.

== Service history ==
HNLMS Bangkalan would be converted to minelayer at the Marine Etablissement in Surabaya in early 1942. She would ultimately meet her fate there as she was not able to leave in time before the fall of Java, trapping her causing her to be scuttled by her own crew on 2 March 1942.
