= HNLMS Willebrord Snellius =

Royal Netherlands Navy Auxiliary

History

Netherlands
- Name: Willebrord Snellius
- Namesake: Willebrord Snellius
- Builder: Maatschappij voor Scheeps- en Werktuigbouw Fijenoord, Rotterdam
- Launched: 1928
- Commissioned: 1928 Governments Navy; 1938 Royal Netherlands Navy
- Out of service: 6 March 1942
- Fate: Scuttled to block the entrance to Surabaya Naval Harbor

General characteristics
- Type: Auxiliary, hydrographic survey ship, patrol boat
- Displacement: 930 t (920 long tons) standard
- Length: 62.1 m (203 ft 9 in)
- Beam: 9.7 m (31 ft 10 in)
- Draught: 3.61 m (11 ft 10 in)
- Installed power: 525 hp (391 kW)
- Propulsion: 1 × Werkspoor triple expansion
- Speed: 10.5 knots (19.4 km/h; 12.1 mph)
- Complement: 84
- Armament: 1 × 75 mm (3.0 in) cannon; 2 × 12.7 mm (0.50 in) machine guns

HNLMS Willebrord Snellius was a hydrographic survey vessel created for service with the Government Navy in the Dutch East Indies. The ship was named after Willebrord Snellius, a famous Dutch astronomer and mathematician.

Willebrord Snellius was militarized by the Royal Netherlands Navy upon the outbreak of World War II and served as a patrol boat in the east of the Indonesian Archipelago.

== Service history ==
HNLMS Willebrord Snellius served diligently as a hydrographic survey vessel with the Government Navy cooperating with older vessels like HNLMS Tydeman. Around 1938 the Royal Netherlands Navy found itself in need for a hydrographic survey vessel of its own in the Dutch East Indies, and the ship was transferred. Upon the outbreak of World War II, the ship was used as a patrol boat around the Celebes. It was at Menado that Willebrord Snellius captured the German freighter Friderun of 2,500 tons on 10 May 1940, the same day on which the Netherlands was invaded by Germany.

When the war expanded to include Japan, Willebrord Snellius was unable to defend the Celebes and escaped to Surabaya, Java. Being unable to escape to Australia after the Allies loss in the Java Sea, the ship was initially abandoned and eventually scuttled as a blockship to prevent Japanese access to the naval harbour at Surabaya. The wreck was blown up by Japanese forces upon their arrival at Surabaya to enable access to the harbour.
