= HNLMS Tydeman =

HNLMS Tydeman is the name of the following ships of the Royal Netherlands Navy:

- HNLMS Tydeman (1916), sunk in 1942
- HNLMS Tydeman (A906), launched in 1975, renamed MV Placius in 2009

== See also ==
- Tydeman
