= HNLMS Albatros =

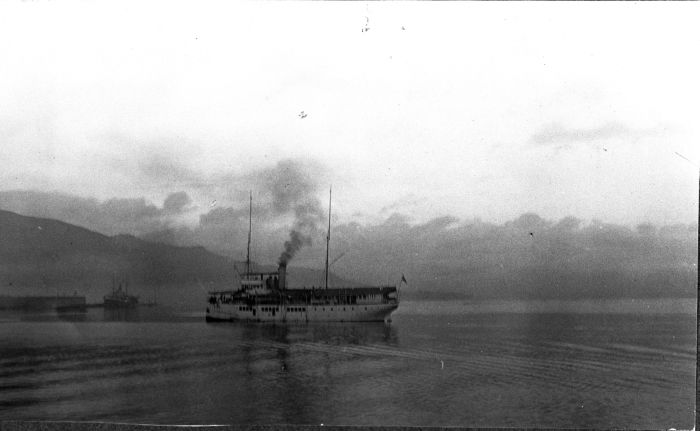
- HNLMS Albatros

History

Netherlands
- Name: Albatros
- Namesake: Albatros
- Builder: Koninklijke Maatschappij De Schelde, Vlissingen
- Commissioned: 28 March 1912
- Decommissioned: 2 March 1942 (Scuttled)
- Renamed: Nibato Maru (As Salvage Ship for the Imperial Japanese Navy from 1943 to 1945)
- Fate: Recommissioned into the Gouvernements Marine after the Second World War, retired from service in 1947.

General characteristics
- Type: Auxiliary, patrol ship, salvage ship, seaplane tender
- Displacement: 1,150 t (1,130 long tons) standard
- Length: 50 m (164 ft 1 in)
- Beam: 9.5 m (31 ft 2 in)
- Draught: 3.1 m (10 ft 2 in)
- Installed power: 1,150 hp (860 kW)
- Propulsion: 1 × Werkspoor triple expansion engine powering 1 shaft
- Speed: 11.5 knots (21.3 km/h; 13.2 mph)
- Complement: 42
- Armament: 2 × single 37 mm (1.5 in) cannons

HNLMS Albatros was a Government Navy vessel serving as patrol ship, seaplane tender and salvage ship. On the outbreak of the Second World War she was militarized and commissioned by the Royal Netherlands Navy.

== Service history ==
Albatros served throughout the beginning of the Second World War. After the fall of Java, the ship was scuttled by her own crew as she was unable to escape.

She was raised by the Imperial Japanese Navy and commissioned as a salvage ship. The vessel was returned to the Gouvernements Marine in 1945 she would serve until 1947 when her machinery was written off.
