= Tydeman =

Tydeman is a surname. Notable people with the surname include:

- Dick Tydeman (born 1951), English footballer
- John Tydeman (1936–2020), English producer of radio and director of theatre plays

== See also ==
- Tideman
