= HNLMS Hoofdinspecteur Zeeman =

Steamship of the Dienst der Bebakening en kustverlichting

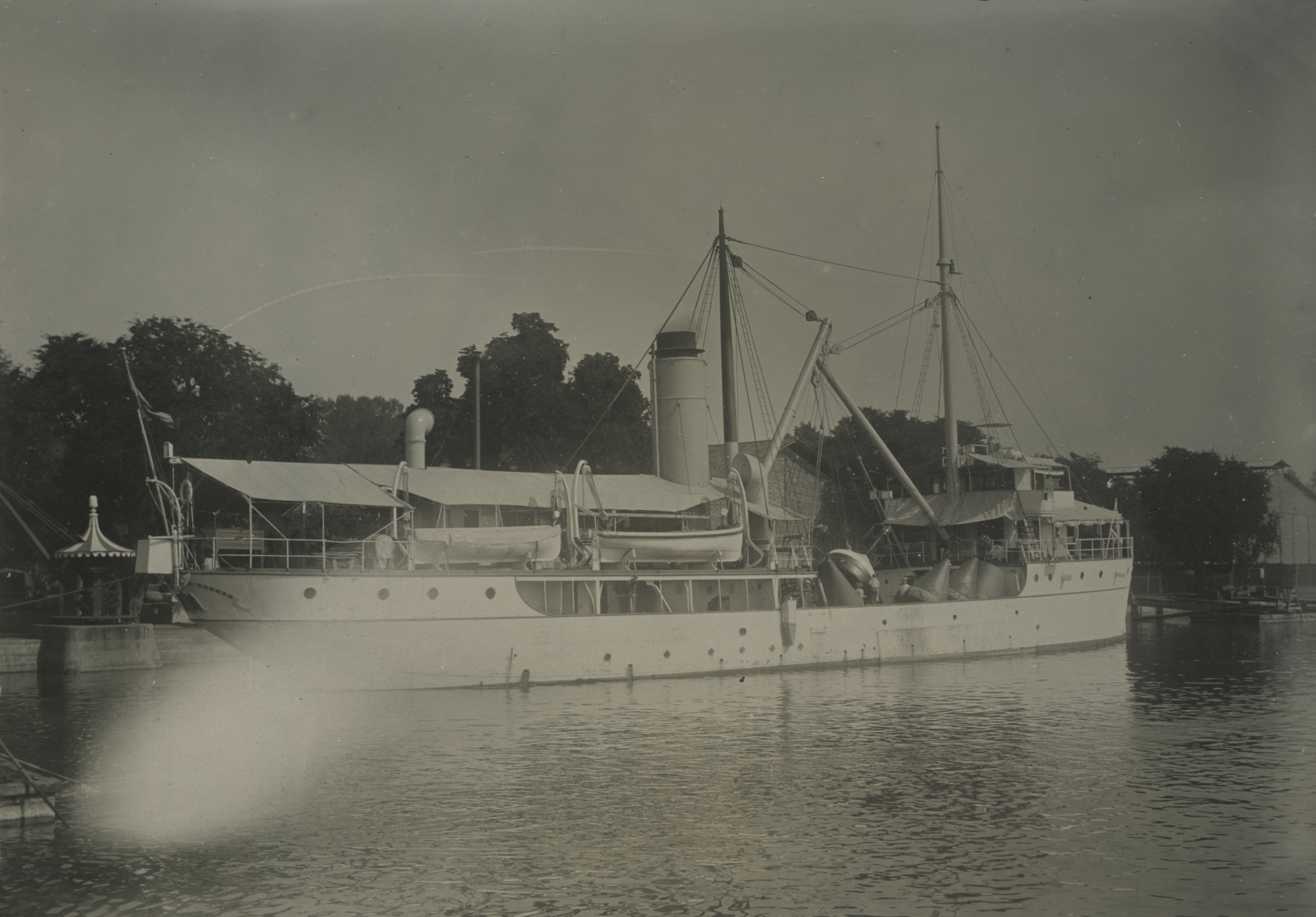
- Hoofdinspecteur Zeeman

History

Netherlands
- Name: Hoofdinspecteur Zeeman
- Operator: Dienst der Bebakening en kustverlichting; Royal Netherlands Navy
- Builder: Nederlandsche Scheepsbouw Maatschappij, Amsterdam
- Launched: 13 May 1909
- Commissioned: 1909
- Fate: Capsized on 5 March 1942

General characteristics
- Type: Steamship
- Displacement: 803 t (790 long tons)
- Length: 52.70 m (172 ft 11 in)
- Beam: 9.20 m (30 ft 2 in)
- Draught: 3.07 m (10 ft 1 in)
- Propulsion: 800 hp (600 kW); 1 x Triple expansion engine
- Speed: 10 knots (19 km/h; 12 mph)
- Capacity: 840 m^{3} (30,000 cu ft) gas storage; 120 tons of coal storage
- Crew: 52

HNLMS Hoofdinspecteur Zeeman was a steamship of the Dienst der Bebakening en kustverlichting. She was built in the Netherlands and served as beacon ship (Dutch: bebakeningsvaartuig) in the Dutch East Indies. In 1939 the ship was militarized and taken into service of the Royal Netherlands Navy as buoy tender.

== Design and construction ==
Hoofdinspecteur Zeeman was built at the Nederlandsche Scheepsbouw Maatschappij (NSM) in Amsterdam and launched on 13 May 1909 from Slipway No. 5. In the same year the ship was commissioned into the Dienst der Bebakening en kustverlichting. The costs of building the Hoofdinspecteur Zeeman was estimated to be 227.240 Dutch guilders.

The steam engines of the ship were made by the Nederlandsche Fabriek van Werktuigen en Spoorwegmaterieel in Amsterdam.

The ship was named after Arie Cornelis Zeeman, the first chief inspector (Dutch: hoofdinspecteur) of the Dienst van Scheepsvaart.

== Service history ==
During the years of the First World War Hoofdinspecteur Zeeman was stationed at Tandjong Priok and performed duties in the waters around Sumatra, Banka, Billiton, West Java and the waters towards Singapore.

=== Second World War ===
After being militarized and taken into service of the Royal Netherlands Navy in 1939 Hoofdinspecteur Zeeman was used as a buoy tender. In this role the ship performed various naval assignments near Tandjong Priok and the surrounding area.

On 4 March 1942 Hoofdinspecteur Zeeman was damaged by a Japanese air attack. The next day on 5 March 1942 the ship capsized at Tjilatjap after she was once again hit by a Japanese air attack.
