= Government Navy =

- Gouvernements Marine; Gouvernementsmarine
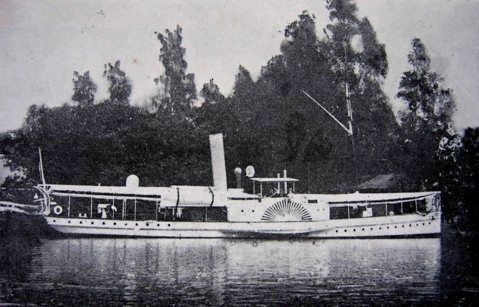
- Government Navy paddle steamer Barito, 1894
- Active: 22 August 1861–1 October 1962
- Country: Netherlands
- Type: Navy
- Size: ≈58 ships in 1940
- Part of: Ministry of the Colonies
- Headquarters: Soerabaja
- Nickname(s): "Van Heutsz's Navy" (c. 1900)
- Engagements: Aceh War; World War II; Indonesian National Revolution; Operation Trikora

The Government Navy (Dutch: Gouvernements Marine or Gouvernementsmarine, GM) was a Dutch naval force in the former Dutch East Indies and Dutch New Guinea between 1861 and 1962. It succeeded the Civil Colonial Navy (Burgerlijke Koloniale Marine) of 1815 and existed alongside the Indies Military Navy (Indische Militaire Marine) until 1930, when the latter was disbanded and the Government Navy was militarized between 1939 and 1941.

After the Pacific War and the Indonesian National Revolution that followed, the GM existed until the handover of Dutch New Guinea to the United Nations Temporary Executive Authority at the conclusion of the West New Guinea dispute between the Netherlands and Indonesia. Operating in a civil-administrative role alongside the Royal Netherlands Navy, the Government Navy had been primarily concerned with tasks such as policing and transport.

== Commanders (Gezaghebbers) ==
Name	Term of Service	Ship
Wink, W.	1 January 1900 – 19 May 1912	
Kaan, J.	1 January 1900 – 26 October 1909	Cycloop
Crans, J.V.	25 January 1900 – 17 March 1905	Hazewind
Hondius van Herwerden, J.H	28 March 1900 – 7 April 1903	
Vorster, H.	28 March 1900 – 19 June 1900	Zwaluw
Have, D.C. ten	8 Aug.1900 - 22 April 1911	Raaf
Steffens, W.	25 February 1901 – 11 March 1914	
Koesveld, P.C. van	14 April 1901 – 16 February 1915	Brak
Berlijn, A.P.	12 October 1901 – 11 June 1904	Bellatrix
Rothmeijer, H.J.F.	4 January 1902 – 2 May 1914	Glatik
Hendriksen, A.	17 January 1902 – 22 March 1912	Albatros
Nix, F.L.	17 January 1902 - 30 Juli 1904	Java
Wetselaar, H.K.	3 September 1904 – 1 August 1913	Pelikaan
Hooghwinkel, J.G.C.	30 July 1904 (?)	Canopus
Overgauw, W.J.J.	26 February 1905 – 16 April 1910	
Resner, L.J.	11 April 1905 – 11 December 1906	Zwaan
Ykema, H.C.	22 July 1906 (?)	
Kieviet, H.	22 May 1908 – 6 December 1911	Hazewind
Meijer, D.J.	2 May 1913 (?)	
Ham, P.J. van der	2 April 1909 – 2 June 1915	Edi
Weel, K.M. van	18 March 1909 (?)	
Bijleveld, W.P.	7 June 1909 – 2 September 1915	
Stikkel, S.N.	22 August 1909 – 4 November 1915	Aldebaran
Holthuis, B.	20 November 1909 – 26 March 1912	Telegraaf
Groot, J.W.	1 July 1911 – 20 August 1914	Speurder
Doesburg, J.J. van	21 May 1913 (?)	Valk
Kruyt, J.C.	1 May 1913 (?)	
Eerde, J.R. van	21 May 1913 (?)	
Drijver, W.C.	10 June 1913 (?)	Flamingo
Wijchers, J.A.	17 June 1913 (?)	Spits
Boer, A.J.L. de	14 July 1914 (?)	Argus
Elbers, G.M.A.	15 December 1915 (?)	
Molenaar, J.	15 December 1915 (?)	Zwaluw
Staudenmayer, J.L.	18 December 1915 (?)	
Heide, G.J. van der	14 June 1916 (?)	Zeeduif
Fenenga, T.	18 December 1918 (?)	Dog
Vooren, J.M.P.	21 December 1918 (?)	Hazenwind
Rozenkrantz, X.W.	23 April 1919 (?)	Argus
Muzerie, C.F.	29 June 1919 (?)	Glatik
