= Boeing hydrofoils =

Hydrofoil craft built by Boeing

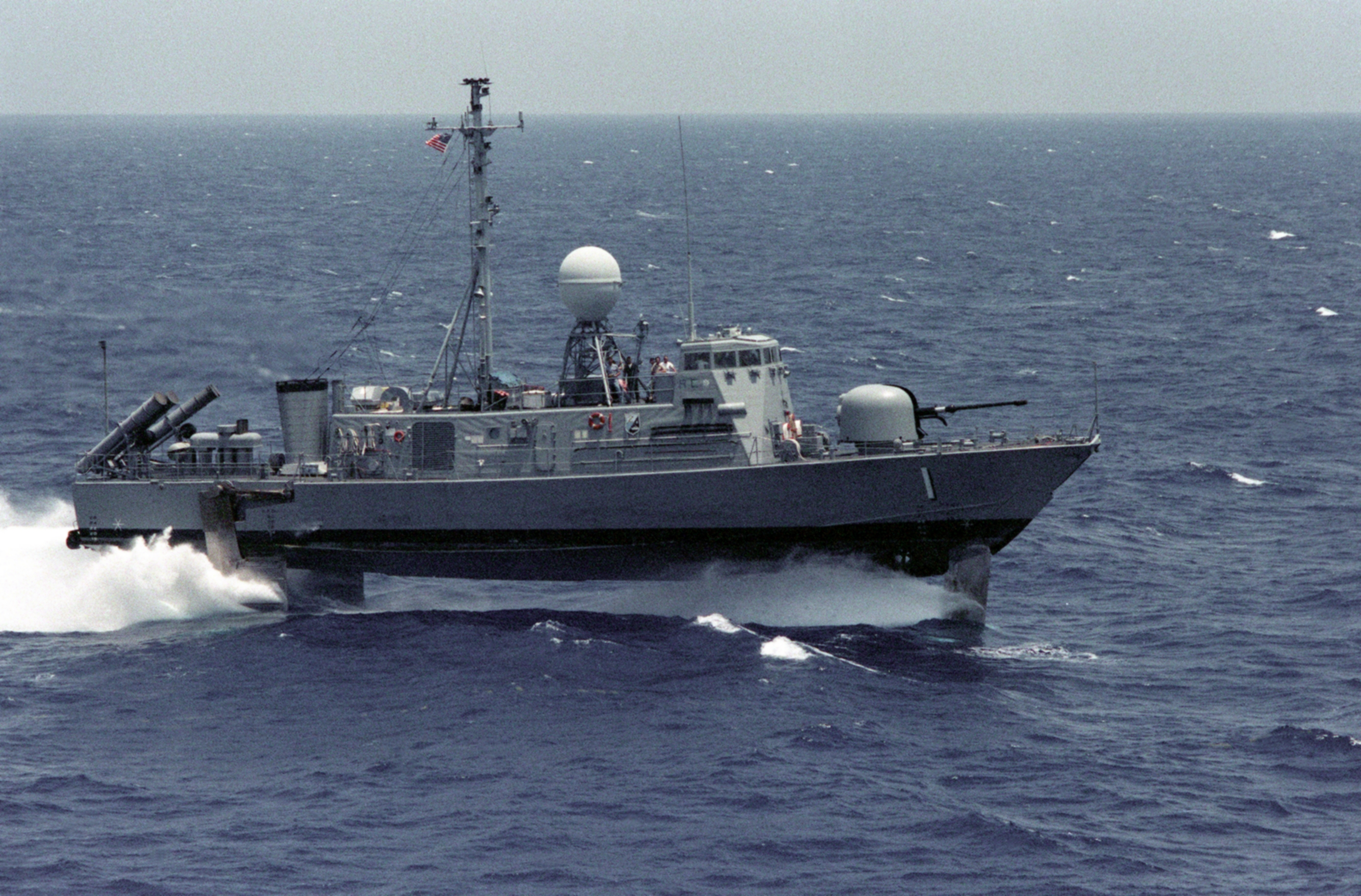
USS Pegasus (PHM-1)

Boeing has designed and built several hydrofoil craft for both military and civilian use.

== Passenger hydrofoil ==
- Boeing 929 - A passenger-carrying water jet-propelled hydrofoil.

== Military hydrofoils ==
=== PCH (Submarine Chaser Hydrofoil) ===
- USS High Point (PCH-1)

=== PGH (Patrol Gunboat Hydrofoil) ===
- USS Tucumcari (PGH-2) (built by Boeing; predecessor to Boeing's commercial JetFoils)

=== PHM (Patrol Hydrofoil Missile) ===
- Pegasus class hydrofoils
  - USS Pegasus (PHM-1), formerly Delphinus
  - USS Hercules (PHM-2)
  - USS Taurus (PHM-3)
  - USS Aquila (PHM-4)
  - USS Aries (PHM-5)
  - USS Gemini (PHM-6)

== See also ==
- USS Plainview (AGEH-1)
