= List of ship commissionings in 1982 =

The list of ship commissionings in 1982 includes a chronological list of all ships commissioned in 1982.

| | Operator | Ship | Flag | Class and type | Pennant | Other notes |
|---|---|---|---|---|---|---|
| 16 January | United States Navy | USS Fahrion | | Oliver Hazard Perry-class frigate | FFG-22 | |
| 30 January | United States Navy | USS Boston | | Los Angeles-class submarine | SSN-703 | |
| 6 March | Royal Australian Navy | HMAS Launceston | | Fremantle-class patrol boat | FCPB 207 | |
| 13 March | United States Navy | USS Carl Vinson | | Nimitz-class aircraft carrier | CVN-70 | |
| 13 March | United States Navy | USS Chandler | | Kidd-class destroyer | DDG-996 | |
| 24 March | Pakistan Navy | PNS Babur | | County-class destroyer | | Purchase date from the Royal Navy of ex-HMS London |
| 6 April | Chilean Navy | Capitán Prat | | County-class destroyer | | Purchase date from the Royal Navy of ex-HMS Norfolk |
| 17 April | United States Navy | USS Cape Cod | | Yellowstone-class destroyer tender | AD-43 | |
| 17 April | United States Navy | USS Lewis B. Puller | | Oliver Hazard Perry-class frigate | FFG-23 | |
| 17 April | United States Navy | USS Stephen W. Groves | | Oliver Hazard Perry-class frigate | FFG-29 | |
| 15 May | United States Navy | USS Boone | | Oliver Hazard Perry-class frigate | FFG-28 | |
| 20 June | Royal Navy | HMS Illustrious | | Invincible-class aircraft carrier | R06 | |
| 26 June | United States Navy | USS John L. Hall | | Oliver Hazard Perry-class frigate | FFG-32 | |
| 26 June | United States Navy | USS Aquila | | Pegasus-class hydrofoil | PHM-4 | |
| 1 July | Royal Navy | HMS Liverpool | | Type 42 destroyer | D92 | |
| 1 July | United States Navy | USS Baltimore | | Los Angeles-class submarine | SSN-704 | |
| 7 August | United States Navy | USS Copeland | | Oliver Hazard Perry-class frigate | FFG-25 | |
| 11 September | United States Navy | USS Michigan | | Ohio-class submarine | SSBN-727 | |
| 18 September | Hellenic Navy | Limnos | | Elli-class frigate | F451 | |
| 9 October | United States Navy | USS Aubrey Fitch | | Oliver Hazard Perry-class frigate | FFG-34 | |
| 23 October | United States Navy | USS Stark | | Oliver Hazard Perry-class frigate | FFG-31 | |
| 13 November | Royal Australian Navy | HMAS Ipswich | | Fremantle-class patrol boat | FCPB 209 | |
| 15 November | Royal Netherlands Navy | HNLMS Bloys van Treslong | | Kortenaer-class frigate | F824 | |
| 27 November | United States Navy | USS Mahlon S. Tisdale | | Oliver Hazard Perry-class frigate | FFG-27 | |
| 16 December | Royal Navy | HMS Manchester | | Type 42 destroyer | D95 | |
