= USS Tucumcari =

Boeing-built hydrofoil

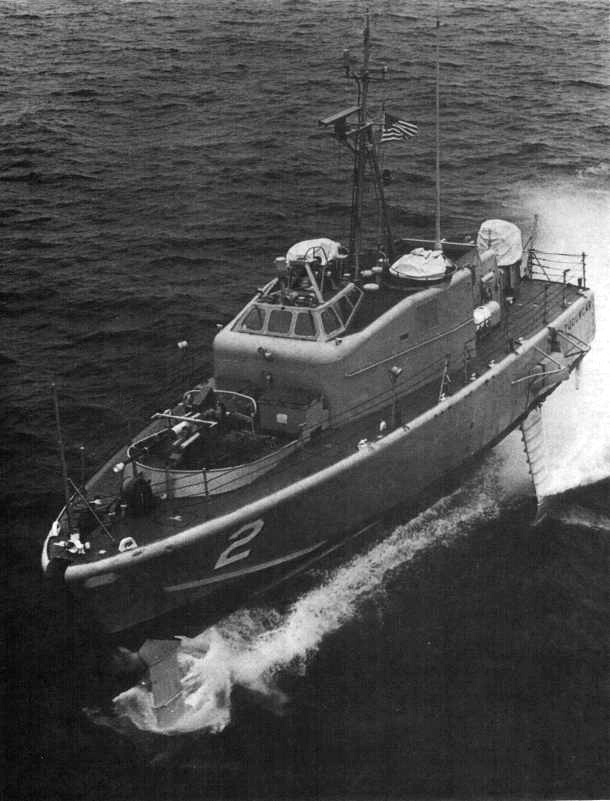
- USS Tucumcari (PGH-2) at sea

History

United States
- Name: USS Tucumcari
- Namesake: Tucumcari, New Mexico
- Ordered: 1966
- Laid down: 1 September 1966
- Launched: 15 July 1967
- In service: 7 March 1968
- Out of service: 1972
- Stricken: 7 November 1973
- Fate: Scrapped

General characteristics
- Displacement: 57 tons (full load)
- Length: 72 ft 0 in (21.95 m)
- Beam: 35 ft 4 in (10.77 m)
- Draft: 4 ft 6 in (1.37 m)
- Propulsion: Bristol Proteus gas turbine driving water jets
- Speed: over 40 knots (74 km/h; 46 mph)
- Complement: 1 officer, 12 enlisted men (design)
- Armament: One 40 mm gun, four .50 cal (12.7 mm) machine guns, one 81 mm mortar

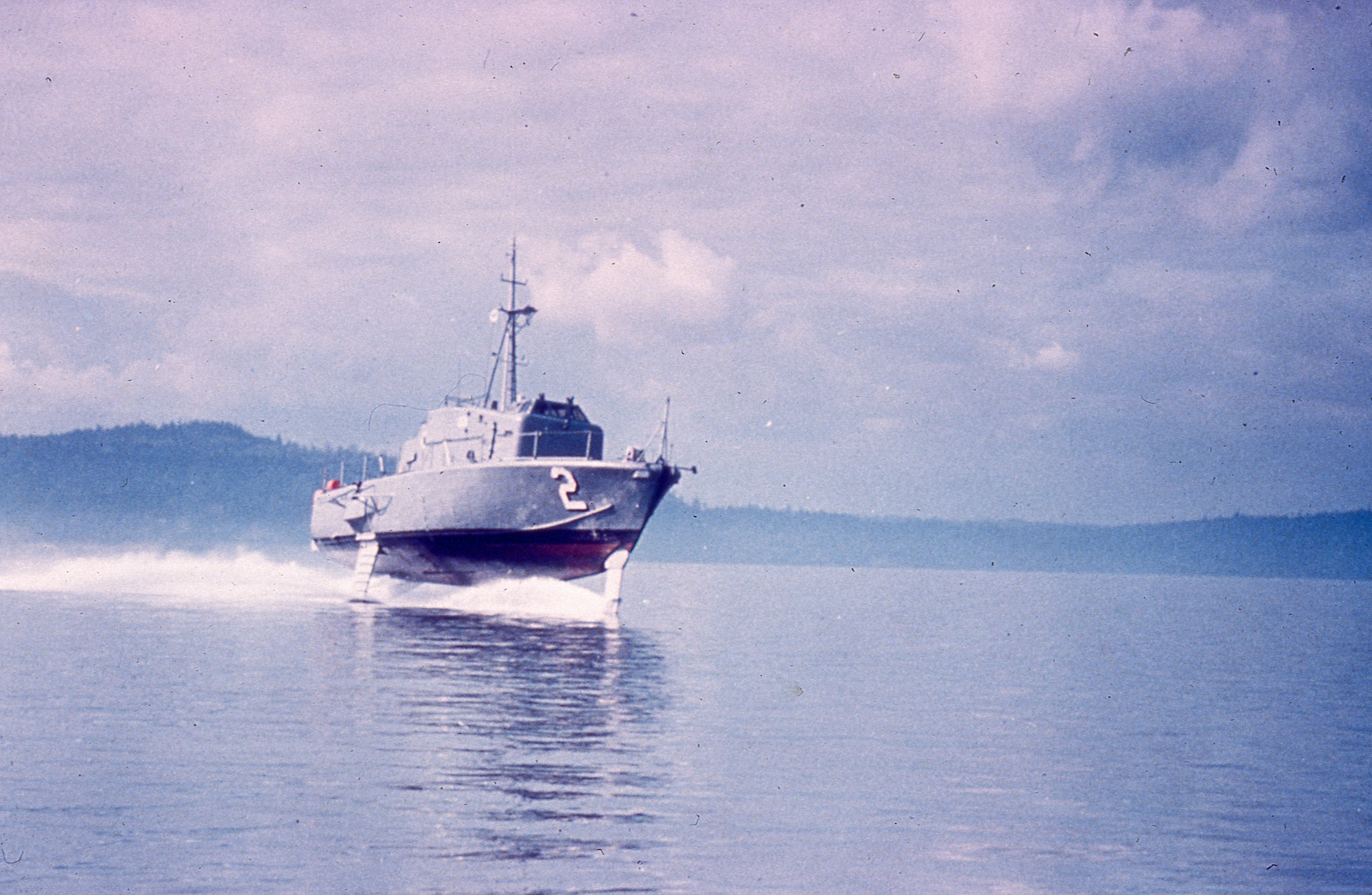
USS Tucumcari traveling at high speed

USS Tucumcari (PGH-2) was a Boeing-built hydrofoil. Named after Tucumcari, New Mexico, it was the basis for the technology used in the subsequent Pegasus-class patrol boats and the Jetfoil ferries. Its unique feature was a waterjet propulsion and a computer-controlled fully submerged foil configuration of one foil at the bow and foils on the port and starboard sides. The Tucumcari was one of two prototype boats contracted by the Navy under project SCB 252 for the purpose of evaluating the latest hydrofoil technology. The second boat was the rival Grumman-built USS Flagstaff.

== Construction, operations in San Diego, and deployment to Vietnam ==
The first waterjet propelled Patrol Gunboat Hydrofoil Tucumcari (PGH-2) was built for operation by the Navy at a cost of $4 million by a Boeing subcontractor in Tacoma, Washington, and then assembled and outfitted at a Boeing facility in Seattle. Boeing's previous US Navy operated hydrofoil was the Patrol Craft Hydrofoil USS High Point, which utilized two forward hydrofoils and propellers on an aft-mounted single foil. Before that, Boeing had built and operated several hydroplane and hydrofoil test craft for itself and for the Navy.

The assembly and outfitting of Tucumcari began on 1 September 1966 at the Advanced Marine Systems Division of the Boeing Aerospace Group. Tucumcari was launched on 15 July 1967, and delivered to the Navy on 8 March 1968. Placed "in service with an officer-in charge" as a patrol boat (vs. "commissioned" as a ship with a commanding officer) on that day, the ship's first officer-in-charge was Navy Lieutenant Martinn H. Mandles. Tucumcari, an extremely fast, highly maneuverable, prototype hydrofoil gunboat designed to perform well even in heavy weather, represented the culmination of 10 years of hydrofoil development.

The new gunboat arrived at Naval Amphibious Base Coronado, California, her home port, in July 1968. She conducted operational evaluation tests and participated in exercises with the U.S. Pacific Fleet. In addition, she conducted day and night operations with Fleet ships ranging from cruisers to conventional patrol craft. After a year of operating out of Coronado, Tucumcari was deployed to South Vietnam. She spent most of her six months in the combat zone assigned to Operation Market Time, the coastal patrol established to stop the flow of supplies from North Vietnam. While performing this duty, she logged 200 hours of foilborne operations including day and night, all-weather, and high sea state missions. She also conducted underway replenishments with larger Fleet units and vertical replenishment from helicopters. The latter included medical evacuation operations and the transfers of cargo and fuel.

== Return to San Diego and transfer to the Atlantic Fleet ==
Tucumcari returned to San Diego in March, 1970 and operated off the west coast until transferred to the Atlantic Fleet in August. After operating off the east coast into 1971, Tucumcari was slated to deploy to northern Europe and to the Mediterranean to demonstrate the capability of hydrofoil propulsion for other NATO nations. It was hoped that the demonstration would stimulate the development and production of a NATO guided missile hydrofoil.

On 22 March 1971, Tucumcari was deck-loaded "piggyback" on board the USS Wood County (LST-1178), secured in a specially-constructed cradle on the main deck, at Little Creek, Virginia in preparation for a tour to promote the Navy's newest developments in hydrofoil technology. Three days later, the tank landing ship sailed from Little Creek, bound for the first stop on the special demonstration deployment. Arriving in Copenhagen on 5 April, Tucumcari was off-loaded on the 13th and readied for her first tests. While in Danish waters, the patrol craft participated in Exercise "Evil Edge," a joint West German, Danish, and American patrol boat exercise. During "Evil Edge," the gunboat made simulated attacks against West German destroyers.

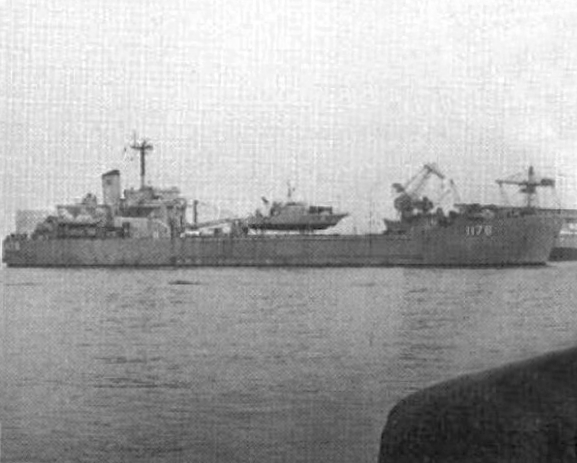
USS Wood County (LST-1178) moored pier side at Copenhagen, Denmark, date unknown. Note the USS Tucumcari (PGH-2) secured to her deck.

Over the ensuing months, Wood County and Tucumcari visited seven other NATO nations and 16 ports (including Copenhagen and Frederikshavn, Denmark): Kiel and Olpenitz, Germany; Isle of Portland and Portsmouth, England; Then, after a transit through the English Channel, she stopped at Rosyth, Scotland returning to the European mainland at Brest and Toulon, France; Naples, Brindisi, La Spezia, and Augusta, Sicily; Athens, Greece; and Gölcük, Turkey. Tucumcari was demonstrated in hopes that NATO would develop a guided-missile hydrofoil weapons system. In addition to providing a base of operations and facilities for briefings and discussions between United States liaison officers and foreign representatives, Wood County provided logistics support, messing and berthing facilities, and engaged in numerous public relations efforts to promote international goodwill. Concluding the last of these tests on 25 September, Wood County (with Tucumcari safely nestled on board) sailed for Little Creek on 1 October. The performance of Wood County and Tucumcari both elicited praise from the Chief of Naval Operations; Commander Amphibious Force, U.S. Atlantic Fleet; the United States NATO Mission; Commander in Chief, United States Naval Forces Europe, and others.

== Damage to the vessel ==
Back home at Little Creek, Virginia, Tucumcari continued her mission of demonstrating hydrofoil technology. Deployments included coastal surveillance with the U.S. Coast Guard out of Woods Hole, Massachusetts and further V.I.P. demonstrations at Annapolis, Maryland and Washington, D.C. On 16 November 1972, Tucumcari suffered a serious accident. While participating in simulated combat operations with other amphibious forces off Vieques Island, Puerto Rico, she ran aground. Hitting a coral reef at 40+ knots, Tucumcari was stopped dead within the length of her hull, forcing the front strut aft and shearing off the port and starboard foils. Several crewmen were injured and two crewmen had to be air lifted by helicopter from the grounded vessel. Fortunately, all the crewmen recovered from their injuries.

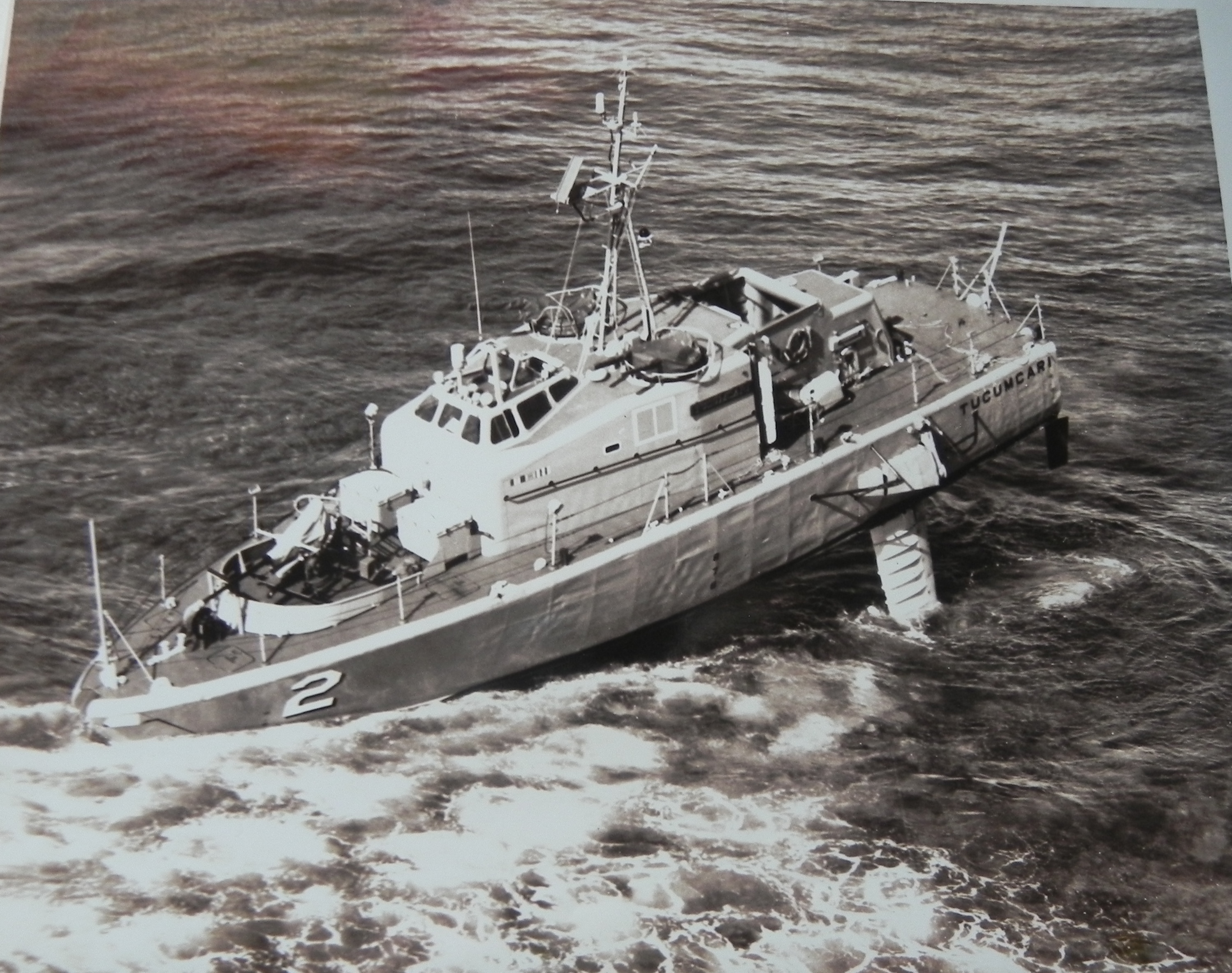
Official United States Navy photograph of the grounding of the USS Tucumcari 11-16-1972. Front/port view.

The fate of Tucumcari was sealed during salvage operations. Damage to ship was a result of the ship going hard aground due to the poor seamanship of the new captain and further damage when a salvage crew pulled the ship off the reef. No damage to the ship took place when the coral behind the ship was partially blasted away by members of UDT-21. The damage was so severe that it was deemed uneconomical to repair, and Tucumcari was, accordingly, struck from the Naval Vessel Register on 7 November 1973. Subsequently transferred to the Naval Ship and Research Development Center at Annapolis, Maryland, she was used as a test hulk for structural evaluation and fire containment tests into the mid-1970s. She was finally scrapped in 1973.

Tucumcari logged over 1500 "flying" hours during her brief service. The waterjet propulsion proved highly reliable, compared to the propeller drive propulsion of Flagstaff, and waterjet propulsion was later used for the Pegasus-class hydrofoil vessels.

== Awards ==
- National Defense Service Medal
- Vietnam Service Medal
- Republic of Vietnam Campaign Medal

== See also ==
- List of patrol vessels of the United States Navy
- Boeing hydrofoils
- USS Plainview (AGEH-1)
