= Patrol gunboat (hydrofoil) =

Patrol gunboat (hydrofoil) was a type of vessel built by the U.S. Navy in the 1970s and tested by the U.S. Coast Guard.

The distinction between a standard Navy gunboat, such as a PC, was that the patrol gunboat (hydrofoil) was very fast, capable of speeds of up to 45 knots, while the standard PC was usually limited by hull resistance to speeds less than 20 knots.

== Example ==
- USS Flagstaff (PGH-1)

== See also ==
- Pegasus-class hydrofoil
- USS Flagstaff (PGH-1)
