= USS Plainview =

Hydrofoil

Coordinates: 46.256886°N 123.851683°W

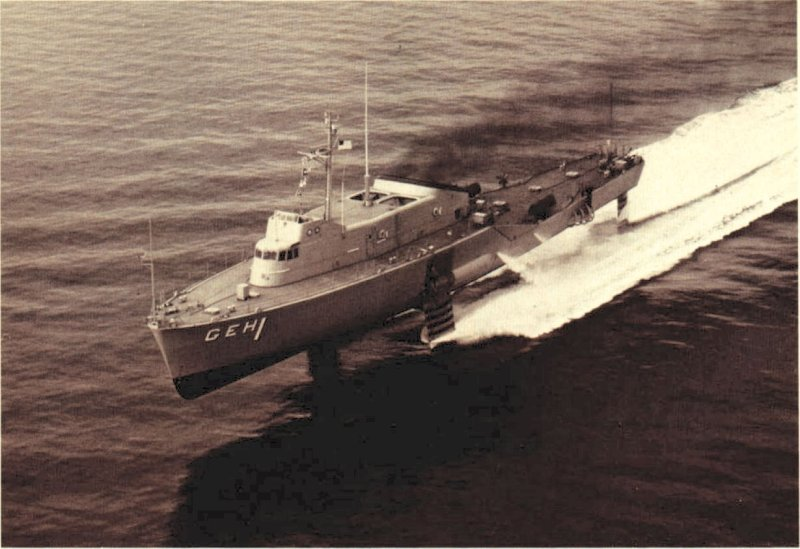
- USS Plainview

History

United States
- Name: USS Plainview
- Namesake: Plainview, New York; Plainview, Texas
- Builder: Lockheed Shipbuilding and Construction Company, Seattle, Washington
- Laid down: 8 May 1964
- Launched: 28 June 1965
- Commissioned: 3 March 1969
- Decommissioned: 22 September 1978
- Stricken: 30 September 1978
- Home port: Bremerton, Washington
- Fate: Partially scrapped, hull still extant

General characteristics
- Type: Hydrofoil
- Displacement: 310 long tons (315 t)
- Length: 220 ft 6 in (67.21 m)
- Beam: 40 ft 5 in (12.32 m)
- Draft: 24 ft 4 in (7.42 m)
- Propulsion: 2 × diesel engines; 2 × 14,000 hp (10,440 kW) General Electric LM1500 free-turbine turboshaft engines
- Speed: 40 knots (74 km/h; 46 mph)
- Complement: 20
- Armament: 2 × Mark 32 triple torpedo tubes

USS Plainview (AGEH–1) was, in its time, the world's largest hydrofoil. Named after the cities of Plainview, New York and Plainview, Texas, she was also the United States Navy's first hydrofoil research ship. Plainview was designed under project SCB 219; laid down 8 May 1964 by the Lockheed Shipbuilding and Construction Company, Seattle, Washington; launched 28 June 1965; sponsored by Mrs. John T. Hayward; and placed in service on 3 March 1969. She cost $21 million to construct.

Foilborne propulsion consisted of two General Electric LM1500 free-turbine turboshaft engines, derivatives of the J79 turbojets used in the F-4 Phantom aircraft, but during conventional (hull borne) operations propulsion was supplied by two diesel engines. Her homeport was Bremerton, Washington. Plainview carried out long range experimental programs to evaluate the design principles of hydrofoils and to develop and evaluate tactics and doctrine for hydrofoils, particularly in anti-submarine warfare, and helped to determine the feasibility of hydrofoil operations in high seas.

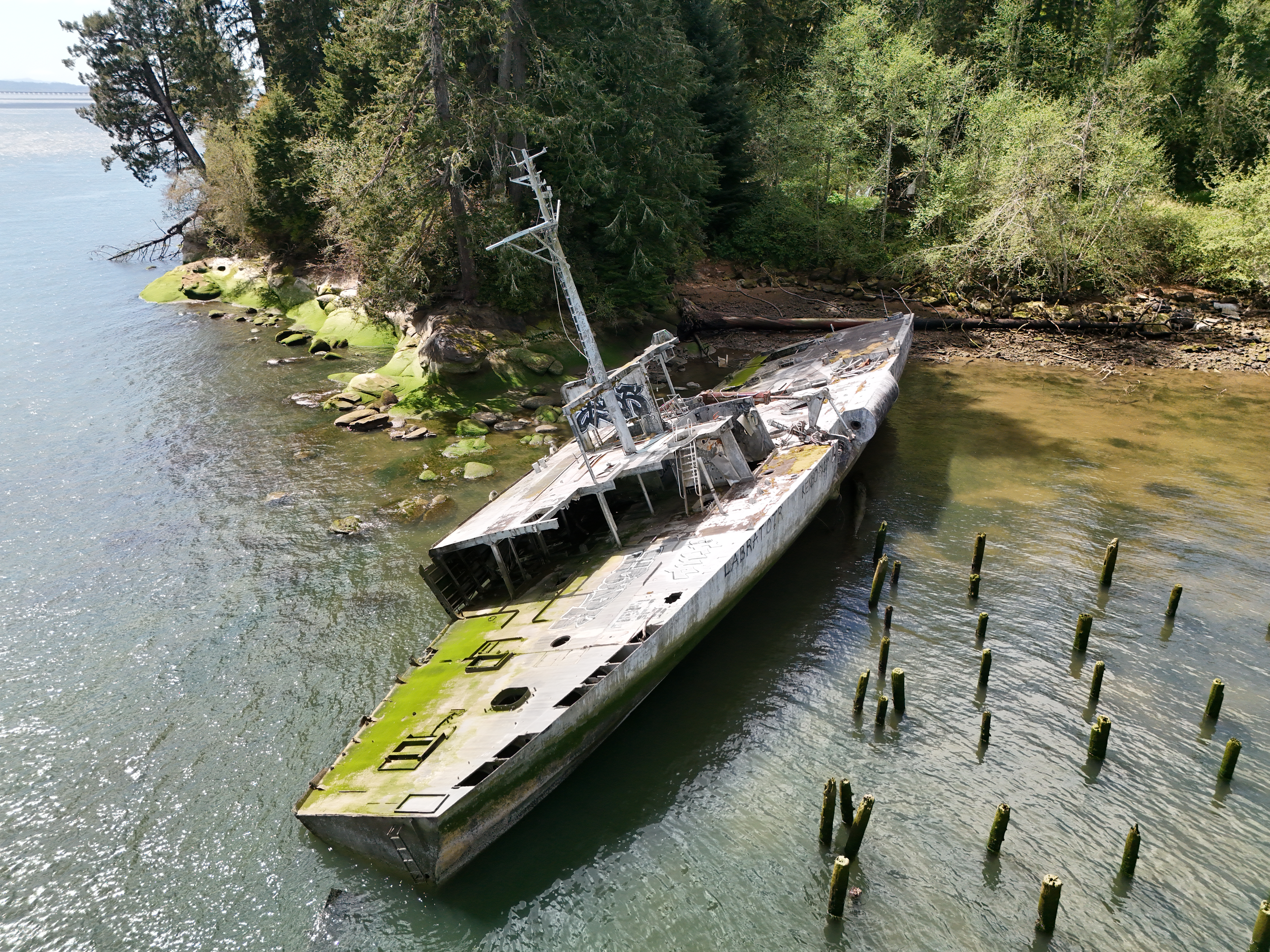
Partially scrapped remains of USS Plainview near Megler, Washington, April 2025

Plainview was decommissioned at 10:30 am, 22 September 1978, at Pier 7, Puget Sound Naval Shipyard. Struck from the Naval Vessel Register on 30 September 1978, Plainview was sold for scrapping by the Defense Reutilization and Marketing Service (DRMS) on 1 July 1979 to General Metals (now Schnitzer Metals) on the Hylebos Waterway, Tacoma, Washington. As of 10 April 2019, the hulk lies abandoned on mudflats, on private property, near Astoria, Oregon. In 2019, the Washington Department of Natural Resources expressed concerns about Plainview's derelict hull leaking pollutants into the environment.

Plainview travelled using the foils for a total of 268 hours, over her entire lifetime.

== See also ==
- List of auxiliaries of the United States Navy
- Pegasus-class hydrofoil
- Boeing hydrofoils
- USS Flagstaff (PGH-1)
- USS Tucumcari (PGH-2)
- HMCS Bras d'Or (FHE 400)
