= USS Wood County =

1957 De Soto County-class tank landing ship

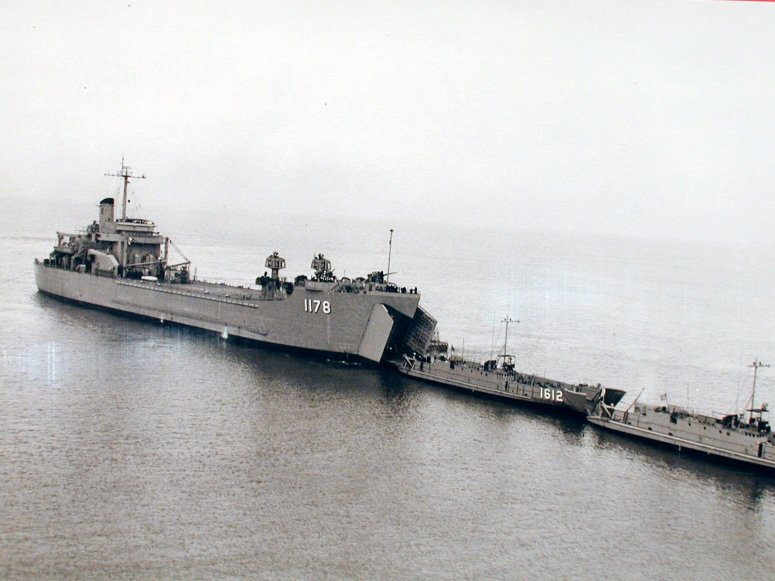
- USS Wood County (LST-1178) seen marrying up with LCU-1612 and another LCU to form a causeway to the beach, date and place unknown

History

United States
- Name: USS Wood County
- Namesake: Wood County, Ohio; Wood County, Texas; Wood County, West Virginia; Wood County, Wisconsin
- Builder: American Ship Building Company, Lorain, Ohio
- Laid down: 1 October 1956
- Launched: 14 December 1957
- Commissioned: 5 August 1959
- Decommissioned: 1 May 1972
- Stricken: 16 February 1989
- Identification: IMO number: 8450366
- Honours and awards: Meritorious Unit Commendation (Dominican Republic)
- Fate: Scrapped, July 2002

General characteristics
- Class & type: De Soto County-class tank landing ship
- Displacement: 3,560 long tons (3,617 t) light; 7,823 long tons (7,949 t) full load
- Length: 446 ft (136 m)
- Beam: 62 ft (19 m)
- Draft: 17 ft (5.2 m)
- Propulsion: 6 × Cooper Bessemer diesel engines, replaced in September, 1969 with six Fairbanks-Morse diesels, two propellers
- Speed: 17 knots (31 km/h; 20 mph)
- Boats & landing craft carried: 4 LCVPs
- Capacity: 28 medium tanks or vehicles to 75 tons on 288 ft (88 m) tank deck; 100,000 gal (US) diesel or jet fuel, plus 7,000 gal fuel for embarked vehicles
- Troops: 410 officers and enlisted men
- Complement: 170 officers and enlisted men
- Armament: 3 × twin 3"/50 caliber gun mounts

USS Wood County (LST-1178) was a De Soto County-class tank landing ship built for the United States Navy during the late 1950s. Named after counties in Ohio, Texas, West Virginia, and Wisconsin, she was the only U.S. Naval vessel to bear the name.

Wood County was designed under project SCB 119 and laid down on 1 October 1956, at Lorain, Ohio by the American Ship Building Company; launched on 14 December 1957; sponsored by Miss Margaret Ackerman, daughter of the president of the American Shipbuilding Company; and commissioned on 5 August 1959 at the Norfolk Naval Shipyard, Portsmouth, Virginia.

== Service history ==
In January 1961, MCB 7 was transported to Guantánamo Bay, Cuba, for a deployment. MCB 4 was transported from Guantánamo Bay to its homeport in Davisville, Rhode Island.

=== Mediterranean, 1960–1962 ===
Following her shakedown and initial operations on the Atlantic seaboard, Wood County was deployed to the Mediterranean for the first time in the summer of 1960, as part of Amphibious Squadron (PhibRon) 2. She subsequently conducted her second deployment to the 6th Fleet in the autumn of 1961 after escorting to division of ocean minesweepers from the east coast to the Mediterranean. During that deployment, the tank landing ship visited Pollença Bay, Mallorca, Spain and the British Crown Colony of Malta, where she embarked a detachment of British commandos that she eventually landed at Bomba, Libya during an exercise. In addition, the ship also visited Valencia, Rota, and Barcelona, Spain; Messina and La Spezia, Italy; Cannes, France; and Piles and Athens, Greece before she returned to Little Creek, Virginia, her home port, in February 1962. On 1 April 1962 Wood County was transferred to PhibRon 12. Later that month, the tank landing ship participated in a large scale demonstration exercise off Little Creek, an evolution witnessed by President John F. Kennedy and the Shah of Iran. Immediately thereafter, Wood County proceeded to Vieques, Puerto Rico where she participated in Atlantic Fleet Amphibious Exercise 1-62.

=== Cuban Missile Crisis, 1962 ===
Wood County underwent a regular overhaul at Newport News, Virginia, from June to August, 1962 before she stood out to sea for trials and refresher training. The tank landing ship deployed to the Caribbean to take part in amphibious brigade exercises and then to become part of the "Caribbean Ready Squadron." In the autumn of 1962, after American aerial reconnaissance disclosed the presence of Soviet offensive missiles in Cuba, President Kennedy insisted that the missiles be withdrawn and imposed a "quarantine" on Cuba. Wood County participated in that operation off the Cuban coast which ended after the Soviet Union removed the missiles.

=== Atlantic Fleet, 1963–1964 ===
The warship began the new year 1963 in the familiar tropical climes of the Caribbean but soon sailed for the Mediterranean. During this deployment, she served as part of the 6th Fleet's amphibious strike force and visited Italian, French, and Spanish ports during the course of her tour. She participated in "Operation Southtrap," a NATO exercise in which she embarked and landed 1,000 Turkish troops with their vehicles. Other landing exercises were held with NATO forces in Turkey, Sardinia, Mallorca, and Greece. She returned home to Little Creek on 19 October 1963.

Following upkeep and type training evolutions, Wood County shifted to Davisville, Rhode Island, to load Mobile Construction Battalion (CB or SeaBee) 4. She transported the Seabees to Guantánamo Bay, Cuba, and carried Mobile CB Battalion 1 from Guantánamo back to Davisville on the return voyage. The following month, the tank landing ship took part in routine Caribbean exercises and, upon completion, took part in a pair of successive Atlantic Fleet amphibious exercises. That summer, in August, Wood County participated in a special balloon-launch in a joint Navy-Air Force project before undergoing overhaul and upkeep at Charleston and Jacksonville, respectively.

=== Dominican intervention, 1965 ===
After a lengthy in-port period, Wood County departed Little Creek in April, 1965 for what promised to be a routine Caribbean deployment. Exercise "Quick Kick VII" took place soon thereafter, before the ship put into San Juan, Puerto Rico to allow the crew liberty. Departing San Juan shortly thereafter, the tank landing ship received urgent orders to sail for the Dominican Republic. There, a coup to return the ousted former president, Juan Bosch, to power, had developed into a bloody civil war when communist elements took control of the pro-Bosch movement to turn it toward their own ends. Heavy fighting developed in and around the capital city of Santo Domingo, prompting President Lyndon B. Johnson to order American marines to the Caribbean isle to halt the coup and protect American lives.

Wood County's task was to evacuate American nationals threatened by the strife in the capital city. To do this, the tank landing ship put into Puerto de Haina (nine miles from the center of Santo Domingo) and took on board 415 passengers for passage to Puerto Rico. Wood County disembarked the refugees at San Juan and returned to the Dominican Republic with marines and a few newspapermen embarked. En route, the ship transferred the newsmen to the Boxer (LPH-4) before she landed the marines in an amphibious operation near Santo Domingo. Moving to Puerto de Haina for the second time, Wood County embarked 1,013 more refugees and ferried them to San Juan. Upon completion of this task, Wood County remained in the vicinity, on patrol duty in a stand-by status, until she returned north and put into Little Creek on 30 June.

=== Mediterranean, 1966–1967 ===
Wood County operated locally off the Virginia Capes into February 1966. She later transported an engineering battalion to Vieques before commencing a restricted availability in April. During July, the tank landing ship operated between Santo Domingo and San Juan. In September and October, the ship prepared for an impending Mediterranean deployment. Wood County escorted Naval Ocean going tugs across the Atlantic to the Mediterranean; and lifted the 3rd Battalion, 8th Engineers, to Rota, Spain, before she participated in a combined amphibious assault with French units at Lovo Santo, Corsica in November 1966. The tank landing ship took part in an amphibious exercise off Sardinia in January 1967 and in two more during March before undertaking a role in a joint amphibious evolution with ships of the Italian Navy at Tagliamento river, Italy and another exercise off Sardinia in April.

=== In reserve, 1967–1970 ===
On her return voyage to the United States in May, 1967 Wood County offloaded Marines and equipment at Morehead City and then entered the Baltimore Shipyard for an overhaul which lasted from June, 1967 to September, 1967. The tank landing ship then was placed in reserve operating status in December 1967 to be effective until January, 1970. During this reserve period, Wood County operated in a restricted operating status and with a reduced manning level, due to the problems associated with the ship's main propulsion system, the six COOPER BESSEMER DIESEL ENGINES. While Wood County remained pier side at Little Creek for the greater part of 1969, her crew labored to preserve and maintain the ship and conducted training on board and on shore. The tank landing ship was also used as a demonstration ship for the amphibious school (a stationary training aid) through the summer of 1969. Groups of students from the school came on board periodically to tour the LST-type vessel.

On 2 September 1969, Wood County proceeded to the Home Brothers Shipyard at Newport News to have the six Cooper Bessemer engines replaced by a like number of Fairbanks-Morse diesels. The work progressed well into the spring of 1970. On 15 June the tank landing ship successfully completed her sea trials and, on the 19th, officially competed her yard period at Newport News. On the 20th, she set out on her two-week shakedown cruise. On Sunday, 21 June, Wood County sighted a red flare and altered course to investigate. She found that the 36-foot sailboat Hiro had been adrift for three days due to a rudder casualty, and she rescued the two occupants. Six days later, Wood County performed her second rescue of the week when she hauled on board two men from a small fishing boat which had been the object of a massive search by United States Coast Guard ships and planes for the past three days.

From August to October, 1970, Wood County underwent shakedown and amphibious refresher training under the auspices of the Atlantic Fleet Amphibious Operational Training Unit. From 16 to 26 October, the tank landing ship provided transportation and berthing for representatives of many amphibious type commands at the Philadelphia Naval Base for participation in a firefighting school conducted there at the time. Wood County underwent type training, acting as control ship for drone aircraft used in various gunnery exercises by the ships in PhibRon 6. Returning to port, Wood County soon commenced a tender availability in preparation for the ship's first Mediterranean deployment in four years.

=== Mediterranean, 1971 ===
16 January 1971 the ship's cargo—two PCF "Swift boats" and a pair of Ammi pontoons—were secured and ready for sea. This was the first instance of Ammi pontoons being side-loaded on a tank landing ship for a transoceanic voyage. Wood County stood out of Little Creek on 19 January, bound for Malta and Crete. The tank landing ship made port at Valletta, Malta on 6 February and off-loaded the two Swift patrol craft. Those boats were to be used by the Maltese government to combat smuggling off the island's coasts. Departing the same day, Wood County pressed on for Crete and arrived two days later. There, she turned the two 54-ton Ammi pontoons over to the Royal Hellenic Navy for use in extending a pier in the harbor at Souda Bay.

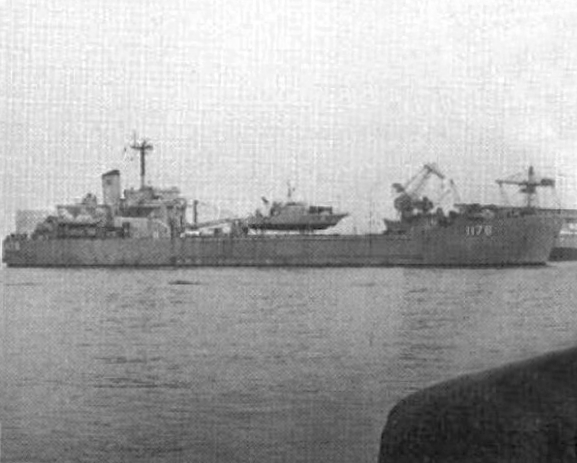
USS Wood County (LST-1178) moored pier side at Copenhagen, Denmark, with Tucumcari (PGH-2) secured to her deck, 1971

Departing Souda Bay on 9 February Wood County returned home via Barcelona and Gibraltar and arrived at Little Creek on 28 February. However, soon after returning to her home port, Wood County began preparations to return to the Mediterranean. The coming deployment would be especially significant, as Wood County had been assigned the task of support ship to the product of the Navy's newest developments in hydrofoil technology, the gunboat Tucumcari (PGH-2). On 22 March 1971, Tucumcari was deck-loaded piggyback on board Wood County; and, three days later, the tank landing ship sailed from Little Creek, bound for the first stop on the special demonstration deployment. Over the ensuing months, Wood County and Tucumcari visited seven NATO nations and 16 ports: Copenhagen and Frederikshavn, Denmark; Kiel and Olpenitz, Germany; Portsmouth and the Isle of Portland, England; and Rendsburg, Germany. Then, after a transit of the Kiel Canal, she stopped at Rosyth, Scotland; Brest and Toulon, France; Naples, Brindisi, La Spezia, and Augusta, Sicily; Athens, Greece; and Gölcük, Turkey. Tucumcari was demonstrated in hopes that NATO would develop a guided-missile hydrofoil weapons system. In addition to providing a base of operations and facilities for briefings and discussions between United States liaison officers and foreign representatives, Wood County provided logistics support, messing and berthing facilities, and engaged in numerous public relations efforts to promote international goodwill. The performance of Wood County and Tucumcari both elicited praise from the Chief of Naval Operations; Commander Amphibious Force, U.S. Atlantic Fleet; the United States NATO Mission; Commander in Chief, United States Naval Forces Europe, and others.

=== Decommissioning and scrapping, 1972–1989 ===
Upon Wood County's return, she offloaded Tucumcari and began preparations for a Board of Inspection and Survey inspection in November. Following that, Wood County was placed out of commission, in reserve, on 15 February 1972. On 1 May 1972, Wood County was decommissioned. Wood County was berthed in the James River, part of the National Defense Reserve Fleet, in temporary custody of the Maritime Administration, from 1972 to July 1977. After that date, the tank landing ship was shifted to the Portsmouth berthing area, where she remained until struck from the Naval Vessel Register 16 February 1989. Wood County was scrapped in July 2002 at Transforma Marine, Brownsville, Texas.

Wood County received a Meritorious Unit Commendation for the Dominican Republic Intervention of 1965.

== See also ==
- List of United States Navy LSTs

The Wood County had her engines overhauled at Baltimore Ship Yards in 1967 prior to them being fully replaced in 1968 or 1969.
