= USS Aubrey Fitch =

US Navy guided missile frigate

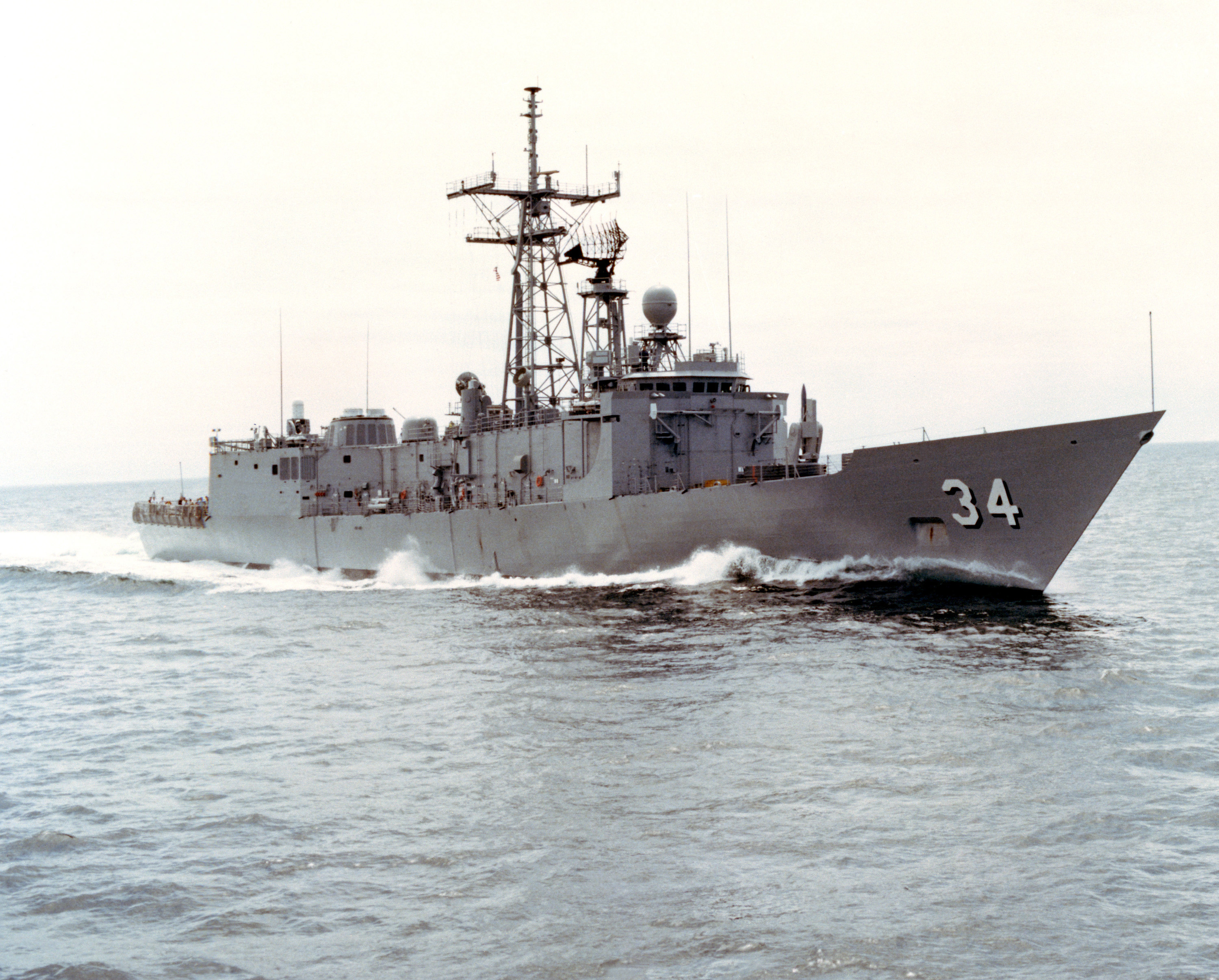
- USS Aubrey Fitch (FFG-34), underway during post-shakedown yard period sea trials, 5 May 1983.

History

United States
- Name: Aubrey Fitch
- Namesake: Admiral Aubrey Fitch
- Ordered: 23 January 1978
- Builder: Bath Iron Works, Bath, Maine
- Laid down: 10 April 1981
- Launched: 17 October 1981
- Sponsored by: Mrs. Francesca Fitch Ferguson
- Acquired: 1 October 1982
- Commissioned: 9 October 1982
- Decommissioned: 12 December 1997
- Stricken: 3 May 1999
- Home port: Mayport, Florida (former)
- Identification: Hull symbol:FFG-34; Code letters:NAWF
- Motto: "A Breed Apart"
- Fate: Sold for scrapping 11 March 2004
- Notes: First Oliver Hazard Perry-class ship to be scrapped

General characteristics
- Class & type: Oliver Hazard Perry-class frigate
- Displacement: 4,100 long tons (4,200 t), full load
- Length: 445 feet (136 m), overall
- Beam: 45 feet (14 m)
- Draught: 22 feet (6.7 m)
- Propulsion: 2 × General Electric LM2500-30 gas turbines generating 41,000 shp (31 MW) through a single shaft and variable pitch propeller; 2 × Auxiliary Propulsion Units, 350 hp (260 kW) retractable electric azimuth thrusters for maneuvering and docking.
- Speed: over 29 knots (54 km/h)
- Range: 5,000 nautical miles at 18 knots (9,300 km at 33 km/h)
- Complement: 15 officers and 190 enlisted, plus SH-60 LAMPS detachment of roughly six officer pilots and 15 enlisted maintainers
- Sensors & processing systems: AN/SPS-49 air-search radar; AN/SPS-55 surface-search radar; CAS and STIR fire-control radar; AN/SQS-56 sonar.
- Electronic warfare & decoys: AN/SLQ-32
- Armament: As built: 1 × OTO Melara Mk 75 76 mm/62 caliber naval gun; 2 × Mk 32 triple-tube (324 mm) launchers for Mark 46 torpedoes; 1 × Vulcan Phalanx CIWS; 4 × .50-cal (12.7 mm) machine guns.; 1 × Mk 13 Mod 4 single-arm launcher for Harpoon anti-ship missiles and SM-1MR Standard anti-ship/air missiles (40 round magazine); Note: As of 2004, Mk 13 systems removed from all active US vessels of this class.
- Armor: none
- Aircraft carried: 1 × SH-2F LAMPS I
- Aviation facilities: hangar, flight deck, & repair shop

USS Aubrey Fitch (FFG-34), the twenty-sixth ship of the Oliver Hazard Perry-class of guided-missile frigates, was named for Vice-Admiral Aubrey Fitch (1883–1978), who was noted for his outstanding command work in the South Pacific during World War II.

Ordered on 23 January 1978, as a part of the FY-1978 program, Aubrey Fitch was laid down on 10 April 1981 at the Bath Iron Works, Bath, Maine. She was launched on 17 October 1981—sponsored by Mrs. Francesca Fitch Ferguson, the granddaughter of the late Admiral Fitch—and was commissioned in Bath, Maine, on 9 October 1982.

This warship was decommissioned on 12 December 1997 and stricken from the Navy's list on 3 May 1999.

== 1982 ==
After commissioning, Aubrey Fitch remained at Bath for another five weeks completing her outfitting, propulsion plant testing, and sailors' training. In mid-November, she made the passage from Bath to her home port, Mayport, Florida, where she spent the remainder of 1982. She was the final "Short-Hull" Oliver Hazard Perry-class guided-missile frigate to be built, the rest were "Long-Hulls".

== 1983 ==
Early in January 1983, the guided-missile frigate embarked upon her shakedown cruise to the vicinity of Guantánamo Bay, Cuba. The warship returned to Mayport during the middle of February and then launched into a series of trials, qualifications, and certifications preparatory to her final acceptance by the Navy. She completed final acceptance trials late in May and entered the yard at Bath Iron Works for a three-month, post-shakedown availability. Aubrey Fitch completed repairs and returned to Mayport in September. In October, she commenced refresher training out of Guantánamo Bay.

The guided-missile frigate was so engaged when United States military forces invaded the small Caribbean island nation of Grenada on 25 October. Aubrey Fitch interrupted refresher training to conduct patrols in defense of the base at Guantánamo Bay against possible hostile action by Cuba as a result of the conflict in Grenada.

Early in November, however the warship completed refresher training and assumed tactical control of Aquila and Taurus for the purpose of testing the feasibility of operating guided-missile frigates and guided-missile hydrofoil gunboats together in the same task organization. Demands attendant to the continuing American presence in Grenada, however, overtook the experiment and sent Aubrey Fitch and her two consorts south to the tiny republic. Duty in the waters adjacent to Grenada lasted until mid-December when the warship returned to Mayport.

== 1984 ==
Aubrey Fitch began 1984 in her home port. Later in January, she embarked upon a normal schedule of training operations in the West Indies. That employment occupied her through the month of May and into June. On 22 June, the guided missile frigate put to sea to become a unit of NATO's Standing Naval Force, Atlantic, based at Plymouth, England. That deployment included visits to a number of ports in northern Europe as well as training evolutions in the Baltic Sea. Early in the fall of 1984, the NATO force visited American waters and made calls at Charleston, Savannah, and New Orleans. Late in November, the warships visited Aubrey Fitch's home port in Florida. Early in December, the NATO force headed back to Europe, leaving Aubrey Fitch at Mayport.

== 1985 ==
The warship opened 1985 much the same way as she did 1984. After concluding holiday leave and upkeep at Mayport during the first half of January, she returned to sea for the usual training exercises, equipment operation certifications, and ASW helicopter landing qualifications. These and similar evolutions alternated with periods in port for routine upkeep and availability occupied her time during the first five months of the year. In June, Aubrey Fitch began providing escort and plane guard services for America and Saratoga when the carriers put to sea to conduct landing qualifications.

Near the end of June, she put to sea for special operations off the west coast of the Isthmus of Panama. She transited the Panama Canal and then operated from PSA Panama International Terminal during July, August, and part of September. After passing back through the canal in mid-September, Aubrey Fitch arrived back at Mayport on the 21st. Repairs took up the remainder of September as well as October and November. She concluded her restricted availability with sea trials on 5 and 6 December and, after a brief round trip to Charleston and back, settled into the usual year-end holiday routine.

== 1986 ==
The relative inactivity of holiday standdown carried over into the first three weeks of 1986. On 21 January, Aubrey Fitch put to sea for a week of ASW training in the Bahama Islands. On 28 January, she interrupted her return voyage when the Space Shuttle Challenger disintegrated soon after launch. From her position just 50 miles southeast of Cape Canaveral Aubrey Fitch rushed to the scene of the tragedy and began recovering debris. She collected several tons of material which she later delivered to Cape Canaveral to be inspected as a part of the investigation into the cause of the disaster. From Cape Canaveral the guided-missile frigate returned to Mayport and remained there until the second week in February. On 10 February, Aubrey Fitch resumed training operations out of Mayport, and she continued so employed until the beginning of April at which time the warship began preparations to deploy to the Persian Gulf.

On 4 June, Aubrey Fitch stood out of Mayport in company with the frigate Talbot to rendezvous with the destroyers Nicholson and Semmes. She and her traveling companions then laid in a course that took them across the Atlantic Ocean and the Mediterranean Sea, through the Suez Canal, and around the Arabian Peninsula to the Strait of Hormuz. Aubrey Fitch and her consorts arrived at Bahrain in the Persian Gulf on 8 July. The guided-missile frigate spent the next four months conducting patrols and escorting merchant ships in the strategic–and troubled–waters of the Persian Gulf, the Gulf of Oman, and the northern portion of the Arabian Sea. No untoward events marred her sojourn in the region, and she concluded her assignment on 30 October by turning her responsibilities over to the destroyer USS Sampson. Retracing her outward-bound voyage via the Red Sea, the Suez Canal, the Mediterranean Sea, and the Atlantic Ocean, Aubrey Fitch steamed into Mayport on 4 December. Post-deployment standdown took up the remainder of 1986.

== 1987–1997 ==
Over the next ten years, Aubrey Fitch continued to the Middle East and the West Indies. During a 1988 deployment to the Persian Gulf, the frigate participated in Operation Earnest Will, during which she conducted escort missions to protect Kuwaiti merchant tankers from attack during the Iran–Iraq War. In December 1990 the warship conducted counter-narcotics patrols in the Caribbean and eastern Pacific, and received a Joint Meritorious Unit Award for her efforts. In July 1991, Aubrey Fitch hosted the Soviet guided missile destroyer Simferopol during a visit to Mayport.

In August 1991, following the invasion of Kuwait by Saddam Hussein's Iraqi Army, the frigate surged to the Middle East to participate in Maritime Interception Operations (MIO) in the northern Red Sea. Designed to cut the flow of supplies and equipment to Iraq in support of United Nations' economic sanctions, Aubrey Fitch conducted 243 merchant ship boardings and inspected over 3 million tons of cargo. The ship received a Navy Meritorious Unit Commendation for this performance.

In February 1993 the frigate participated in Operation Able Manner, in support of migration interdiction efforts off Haiti, receiving the Coast Guard Special Operations Service Ribbon for developing baseline procedures for conducting mass lifesaving operations.

In 1994, Aubrey Fitch carried out two deployments to Haiti in support of Operation Uphold Democracy, where the crew boarded over 50 ships to enforce economic sanctions against the government and provided security and search-and-rescue support for operations within Port-au-Prince Harbor.

In the summer of 1995, the frigate sailed to Europe both to conduct NATO training exercises and to participate in the 50th anniversary commemoration of the Battle of the Atlantic and the end of the war in Europe.

Aubrey Fitch spent March through July 1995 touring Western Europe, including Bermuda; Brest, France; Rota, Barcelona and Ibiza, Spain; Casablanca, Morocco; Gibraltar, Portsmouth & Liverpool, UK; Lisbon, Portugal; Amsterdam, Netherlands; Derry & Portrush, Northern Ireland and Rosyth, Scotland.

From September 1996 to March 1997, Aubrey Fitch conducted her last operational deployment as part of Standing Naval Force Atlantic, during which she visited fourteen ports ranging between Gdynia, Poland west to Faslane, Scotland and south to Lisbon, Portugal.

Aubrey Fitch was decommissioned on 12 December 1997 and towed to the former Philadelphia Naval Yard as part of the inactive reserve fleet. She had the shortest active career of any of the US Navy's Oliver Hazard Perry-class ships at 15 years, and was stricken on 3 May 1999, just two years later into unmaintained (Category-X) status to await scrap sale. Aubrey Fitch was transferred to Metro Machine Corp. for scrapping, on 26 March 2004.

Aubrey Fitch (FFG-34) was the first ship with this name in the U.S. Navy.
