= Pegasus-class hydrofoil =

Class of U.S. Navy patrol boats

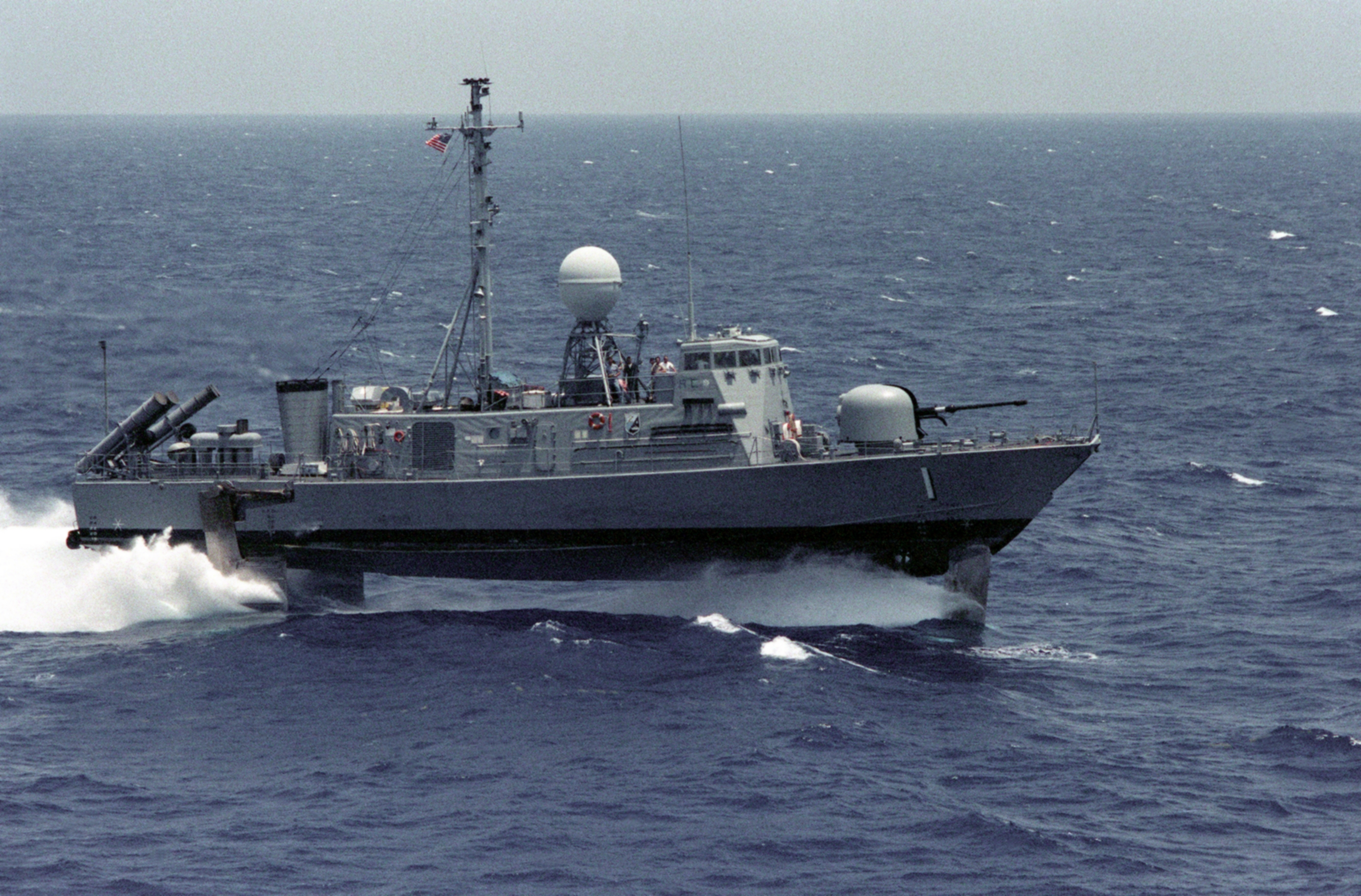
- USS Pegasus (PHM-1)

Class overview
- Name: Pegasus-class hydrofoil
- Builders: Boeing Marine Systems, Renton, Washington
- Operators: United States Navy
- Built: 1973–1982
- In commission: 1977–1993
- Completed: 6
- Retired: 6
- Preserved: 1

General characteristics
- Displacement: 237.2 long tons (241 t)
- Length: 133 ft (41 m)
- Beam: 28 ft (8.5 m)
- Propulsion: 2 × Mercedes-Benz MTU marine diesels (hullborne), 1,600 bhp (1,193 kW); 1 × General Electric LM2500 gas turbine (Foilborne), 18,000 shp (13,423 kW)
- Speed: 12 knots (22 km/h; 14 mph) hullborne; 48 knots (89 km/h; 55 mph) foilborne
- Complement: 4 officers, 17 enlisted
- Sensors & processing systems: LN-66 navigation radar; MK 94 Mod 1 (PHM-1), MK 92 Mod 1 (PHM 2-6) fire-control system
- Armament: 8 × Harpoon Surface-to-surface missile; 1 × Mk 75 76 mm OTO Melara, 62 cal. gun

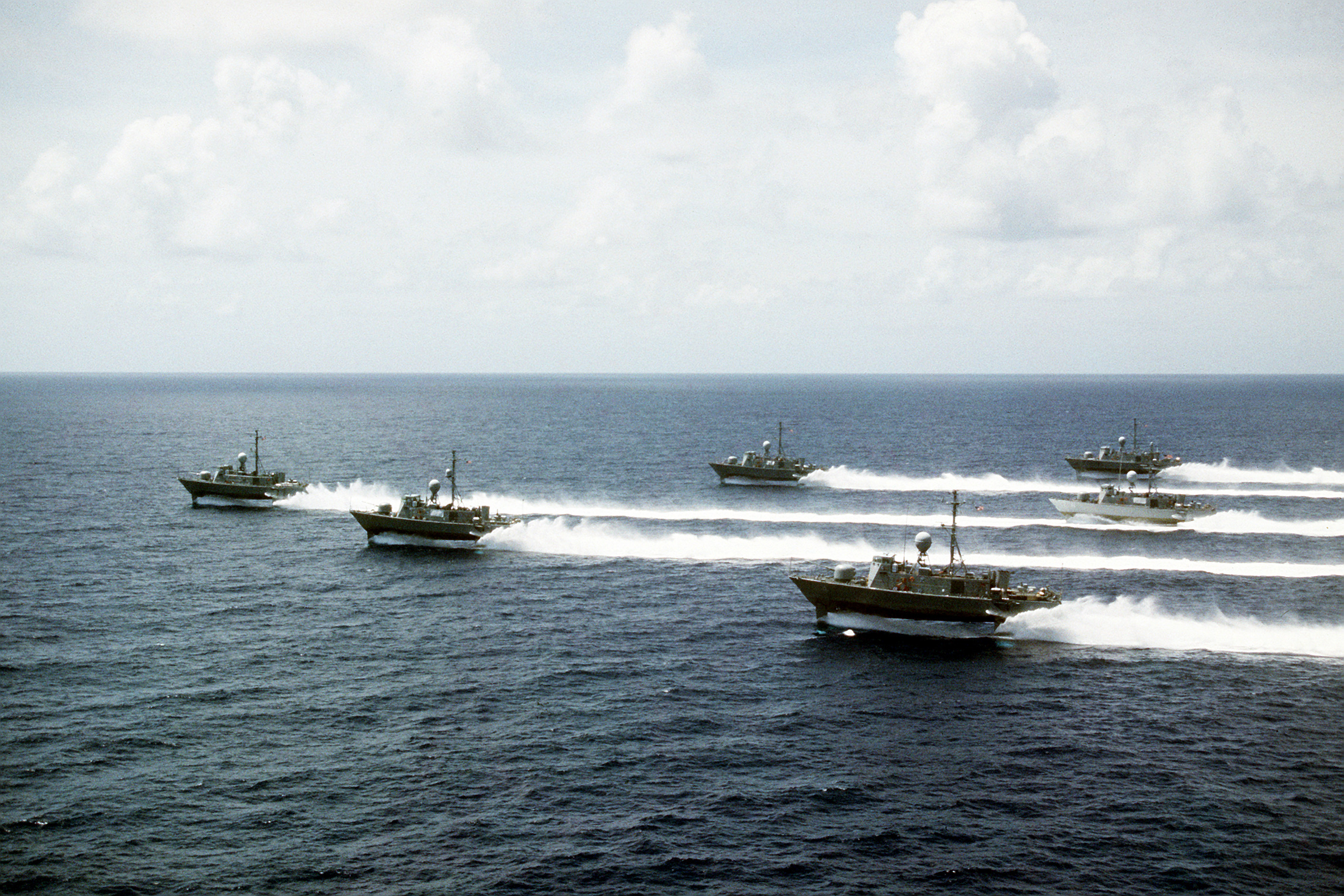
All six members of the Pegasus class of armed hydrofoils

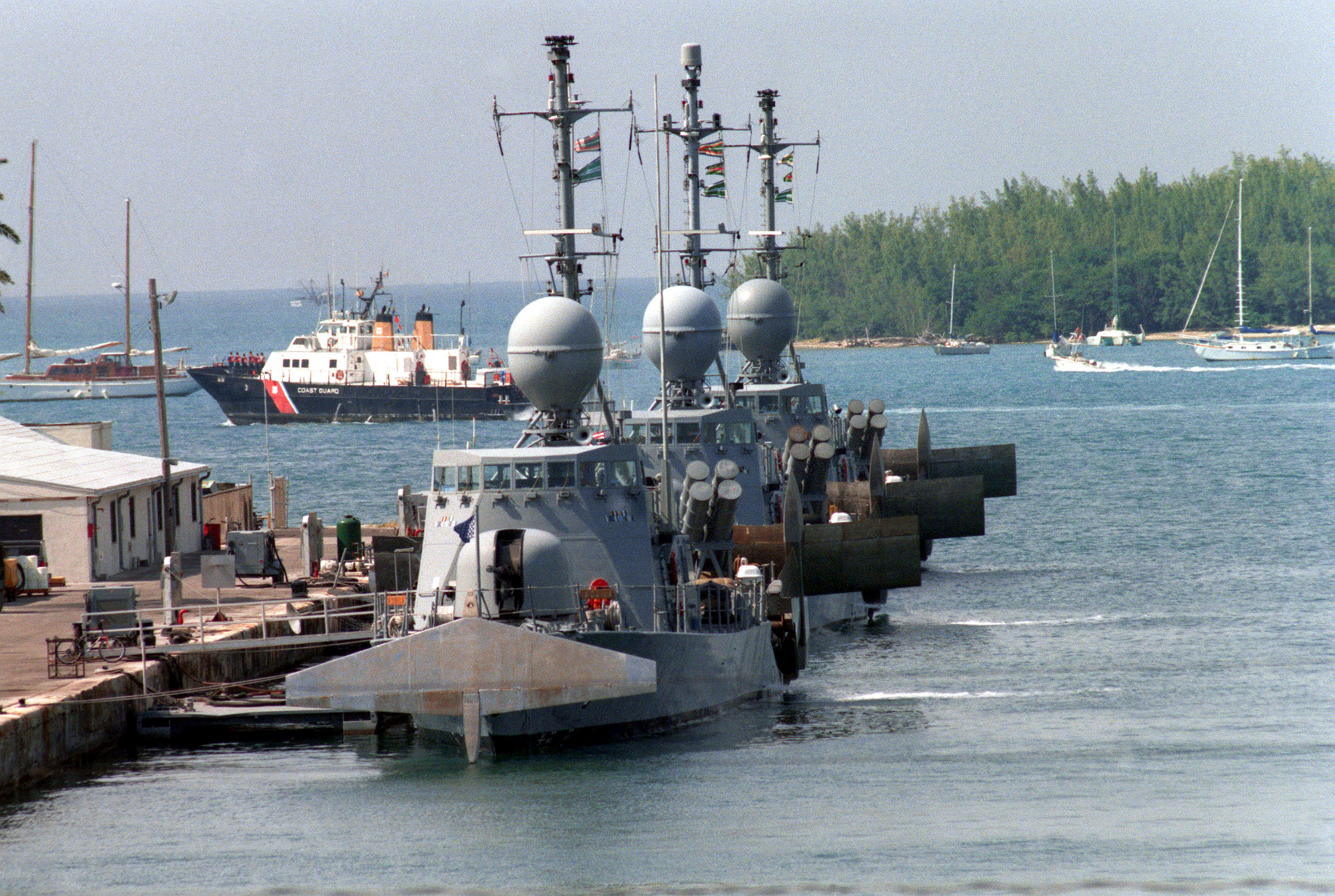
The patrol combatant missile hydrofoils USS Aquila (PHM 4), front, and USS Gemini (PHM 6), center, lie tied up in port with a third PHM. The Coast Guard surface effect ship (SES) cutter USCGC Shearwater (WSES 3) is in the background.

The Pegasus-class hydrofoil was a series of six Patrol Hydrofoil Missile (PHM) vessels operated by the United States Navy from 1977 to 1993. Initially intended to counter Warsaw Pact missile boats such as the Osa-class in NATO littorals, the class proved expensive to operate, fuel-intensive, and carried firepower (in the form of RGM-84 Harpoon missiles) disproportionate to their primary mission of coastal patrol and counter-narcotics operations.

== Development ==
In the late 1960s, NATO sought a small, fast surface combatant to counter Soviet missile boats, but the resulting project was poorly conceived. The United States proposed the PHM as a NATO standard, initially planning up to 30 vessels, with options for Germany and Italy. However, lack of commitment from partners and the Navy's focus on larger ships reduced the programme to just six USN vessels. The project suffered repeated cost overruns and construction delays, and Congressional oversight was selective, concentrating on ensuring completion rather than providing an effective, timely, and capable solution.

== Design and armament ==
The PHMs employed a combined diesel or gas turbine (CODOG) propulsion system with water-jet drives. Diesel engines provided fuel-efficient hullborne speeds up to 12 knots, while a LM2500 gas turbine powered foilborne speeds exceeding 48 knots. Fuel consumption was approximately 1,000 gallons per hour when foilborne and 100 gallons per hour hullborne, significantly limiting endurance.

Armament comprised a 76 mm Oto Melara gun and provision for two quadruple RGM-84 Harpoon missile launchers, although the missiles were seldom carried as they made the class top heavy. While effective against larger surface combatants, this level of firepower was rarely needed in the PHMs’ primary coastal patrol and counter-narcotics roles, highlighting a mismatch between design and mission profile.

== Operational history ==
All six vessels were constructed by Boeing in Renton, Washington, and based at Naval Air Station Key West, Florida. Despite their speed, sustained operations were restricted by limited endurance, maintenance requirements, and high fuel consumption.

== Cost and decommissioning ==
The 1979 GAO report identified alarming cost inefficiencies in the PHM programme, including overpricing and inadequate spare provisioning. High operational costs, combined with a small fleet and limited mission profiles, led to retirement of the class by 1993.

The Aries was preserved as a memorial on the Gasconade River in Missouri. Gemini was briefly converted into a yacht before being scrapped, and the remainder were sold for scrap.

== List of ships ==
- Pegasus (PHM-1) (9 July 1977 – 30 July 1993), formerly Delphinus
- Hercules (PHM-2) (18 December 1982 – 30 July 1993)
- Taurus (PHM-3) (10 October 1981 – 30 July 1993)
- Aquila (PHM-4) (26 June 1982 – 30 July 1993)
- Aries (PHM-5) (18 September 1982 – 30 July 1993)
- Gemini (PHM-6) (13 November 1982 – 30 July 1993)

== See also ==
- Boeing hydrofoils
- USS High Point (PCH-1)
- USS Plainview (AGEH-1)
- HMCS Bras d'Or (FHE 400), a Canadian hydrofoil intended for anti-submarine duties
- HMS Speedy (P296), a Royal Navy Jetfoil mine countermeasure vessel.
- Matka-class missile boat, a class of Soviet PHM
- Sarancha-class missile boat, a class of Soviet PHM
- Sparviero-class patrol boat, a class of Italian PHM
- PHM Pegasus, a videogame based on this class of vessels
- USS Flagstaff
- USS Tucumcari
- List of patrol vessels of the United States Navy
- Osprey-Class PTF
