= USS Gemini (PHM-6) =

Patrol vessel of the United States Navy

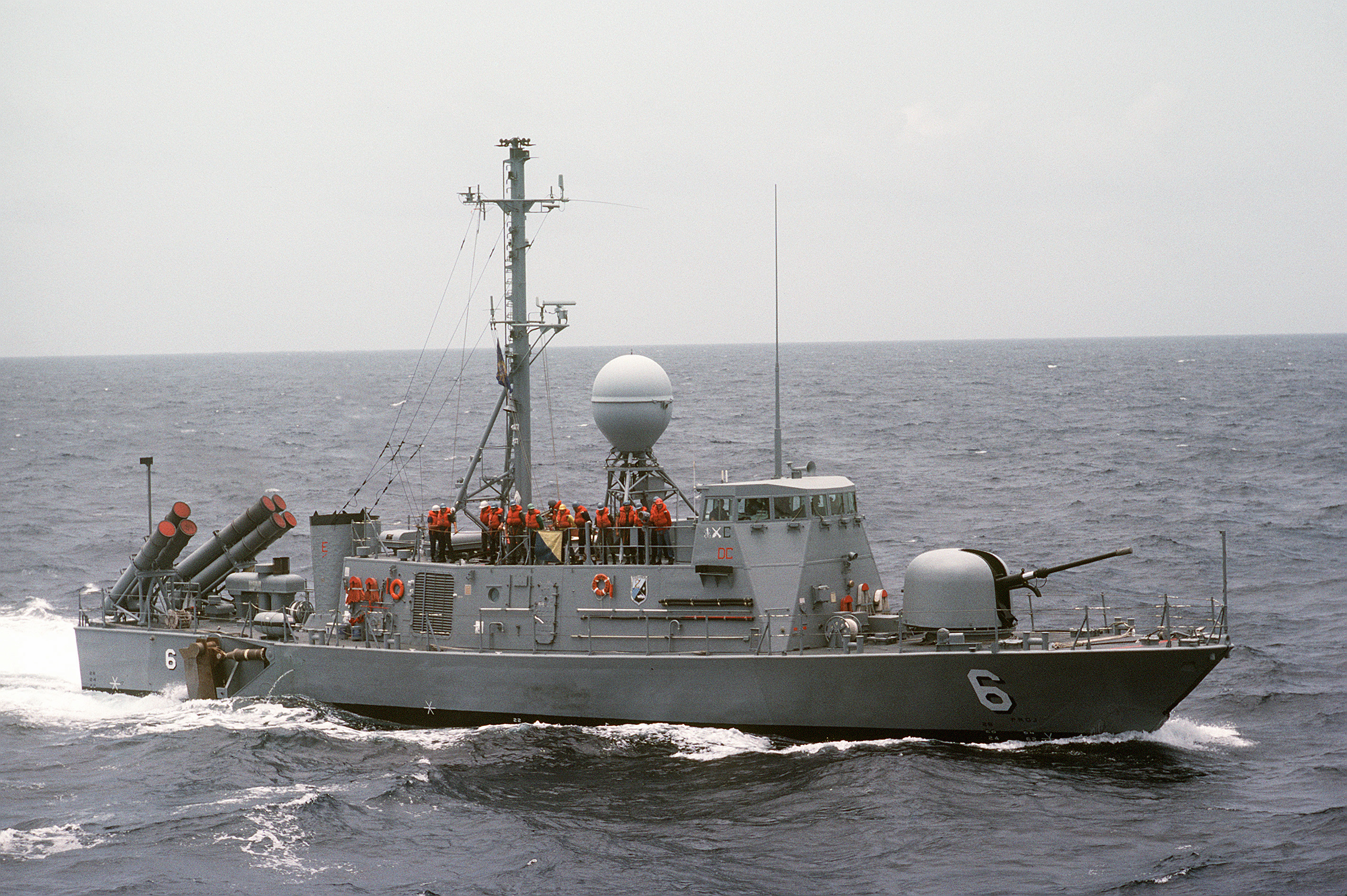
- USS Gemini during exercise UNITAS 85

History

United States
- Name: USS Gemini
- Namesake: Gemini
- Awarded: 20 October 1977
- Builder: Boeing Marine Systems, Renton, Washington
- Laid down: 13 May 1980
- Launched: 17 February 1982
- Commissioned: 13 November 1982
- Decommissioned: 30 July 1993
- Motto: Done Swiftly, Done Well
- Fate: Sold for scrapping, 19 August 1996. Later converted into a yacht but was scrapped.

General characteristics
- Class & type: Pegasus-class hydrofoil
- Displacement: 255 long tons (259 t) full
- Length: 133 ft (41 m)
- Beam: 28 ft (8.5 m)
- Propulsion: 2 × Mercedes-Benz marine diesels (hullborne), 1,600 bhp (1,193 kW); 1 × General Electric LM2500 gas turbine (foilborne), 18,000 shp (13,423 kW)
- Speed: 12 knots (22 km/h; 14 mph) hullborne; 48 knots (89 km/h; 55 mph) foilborne
- Complement: 4 officers, 17 enlisted
- Sensors & processing systems: LN-66 navigation radar; Mk-92 Mod 1 fire-control system
- Armament: 2 × quad RGM-84 Harpoon; 1 × Mk.75 76 mm OTO Melara, 62 cal. gun

USS Gemini (PHM-6) was the final ship of her class of hydrofoils operated by the U.S. Navy. She was named for the constellation.

Pegasus class vessels were designed for high speed and mobility, and carried an armament powerful for its size, consisting of Harpoon anti-ship missiles and a 76 mm cannon.

USS Gemini was converted into a yacht after decommissioning, but was later sold for scrap.

== See also ==
- List of patrol vessels of the United States Navy
