= USS Aries (PHM-5) =

Patrol vessel of the United States Navy

Coordinates: 38°40′15″N 91°33′10″W

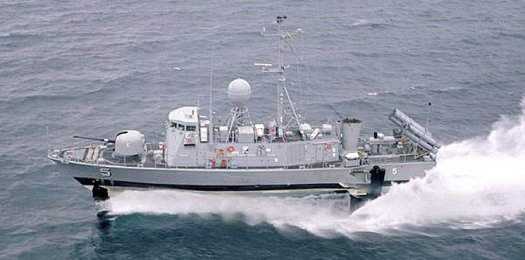
- USS Aries

History

United States
- Name: USS Aries
- Namesake: Aries
- Awarded: 20 October 1977
- Builder: Boeing Marine Systems, Renton, Washington
- Laid down: 7 July 1980
- Launched: 5 November 1981
- Commissioned: 18 September 1982
- Decommissioned: 30 July 1993
- Home port: Key West, Florida
- Status: Museum ship since 1996

General characteristics
- Class & type: Pegasus-class hydrofoil
- Displacement: 255 long tons (259 t) full
- Length: 133 ft (41 m)
- Beam: 28 ft (8.5 m)
- Propulsion: 2 × Mercedes-Benz marine diesels (hullborne), 1,600 bhp (1,193 kW); 1 × General Electric LM2500 gas turbine (foilborne), 18,000 shp (13,423 kW)
- Speed: 12 knots (22 km/h; 14 mph) hullborne; 48 knots (89 km/h; 55 mph) foilborne
- Complement: 4 officers, 17 enlisted
- Sensors & processing systems: LN-66 navigation radar; Mk.92 Mod 1 fire-control system
- Armament: 8 RGM-84 Harpoon (2×4); 1 × 76 mm (3 in)/62 caliber Mk.75 OTO Melara gun

USS Aries (PHM-5) is the fifth ship of her class of hydrofoils operated by the United States Navy. Pegasus-class vessels were designed for high speed and mobility. Despite being small in size, they carried a 76 mm (3.0 in) gun. Aries was named for the constellation.

Aries was laid down on 7 January 1980 at Renton, Seattle, Washington, by Boeing Integrated Defense Systems, launched on 5 November 1981, sponsored by Mrs. Earl B. Fowler, the wife of Vice Admiral Earl B. Fowler, Commander, Naval Sea Systems Command, and was commissioned at the Puget Sound Naval Shipyard on 18 September 1982.

== Service history ==
Aries operated in Puget Sound until 23 November 1982 when she got underway for Key West, Florida, her assigned home port. She made calls at San Francisco and San Diego on her way down the California coast. The guided-missile hydrofoil gunboat transited the Panama Canal on 11 December and arrived in Key West on the 15th. After the holidays, the warship began operations from her base. Acceptance trials came late in January 1983, and, in February, she carried out her first law enforcement operation against drug smugglers in cooperation with the Coast Guard. March and April brought training duty out of Key West and two more missions assisting the Coast Guard in its efforts to stem the flow of illegal drugs into the United States. In each instance, Aries embarked a detachment of Coast Guardsmen and carried out the assignment under the operational control of the Commandant, Coast Guard District 7, based at Miami, Florida. Early in May, she entered the yard at Atlantic Drydock in Jacksonville, Florida, for six weeks of post-shakedown repairs and modifications. Halfway through June, the guided-missile hydrofoil gunboat returned to Key West and resumed a normal schedule of duty out of her home port. Though the bulk of her operations for the rest of the year consisted of routine training evolutions, tests, and equipment calibrations and checks, Aries participated in another anti-smuggling sweep during the second week in August and visited Nassau in the Bahamas later that month.

Normal duty in the waters near Key West kept Aries busy for the remainder of 1983 and during the first few weeks of 1984. In February 1984, the warship expanded her sphere of operations to include the Gulf of Mexico and the east coast of Central America. Late in April, she participated in Exercise "Ocean Venture 84". Aries returned to Key West for normal operations at the end of May and the beginning of June. On 11 June, however, she departed Key West for the waters around Puerto Rico to participate in the initial phase of UNITAS XXV, the 1984 edition of the annual series of multilateral exercises carried out with units of various Latin American navies. At the end of June, the guided-missile hydrofoil gunboat proceeded back to Key West to resume normal duty. In August, Aries took part in maneuvers conducted off the east coast of Central America. Back at Key West at the end of August, she began operating again on a training schedule.

The guided-missile hydrofoil gunboat spent the rest of 1984 and the first part of 1985 engaged in operations in the immediate vicinity of Key West. In March, she traveled to Puerto Rico to participate in a readiness exercise, READEX 1-85. More duty out of her home port occupied the warship's time in April. At the beginning of May, she voyaged to Onslow Beach, where she took part in Exercise "Solid Shield 85." The middle of June found Aries in the waters near Puerto Rico again for the initial phase of UNITAS XXVI. During July and early August, the warship carried out normal operations from her base at Key West. Her third fleet readiness exercise occupied the last half of August. In September, Aries resumed local operations from Key West and remained so occupied for the rest of 1985.

At the end of the first week in January 1986, she moved to Mayport, Florida, for a three-month availability. At the end of April, she proceeded back to Key West where she operated until late in July. At that time, she embarked upon a cruise that took her to the Caribbean for another UNITAS exercise during which she made port calls at La Guaira, Venezuela, and at St. Johns, Antigua. Aries returned to Key West on 14 August and carried out local training missions until mid-October. On 14 October, the guided-missile hydrofoil gunboat set sail for Little Creek, Virginia, to take part in a special project for the Chief of Naval Operations. Over the next two months, she divided her time between her home port and operations off the Virginia Capes. She concluded her development work for 1986 on 12 December and headed back to Key West on the 16th. Aries reentered her home port on 17 December and spent the remainder of the year in that vicinity.

Aries was decommissioned on 30 July 1993.

=== Memorial ===
USS Aries PHM-5 Hydrofoil Memorial, Inc obtained Aries for rehabilitation as a memorial located on the Grand River in Brunswick, Missouri in 1996. As of 2022 she can be found at the USS Aries Hydrofoil Museum. Dedicated to preserving hydrofoils of all types, the museum is centered around Aries.

Bill and Bob Meinhardt and Eliot James, knowing nothing about hydrofoils, bought the 133-foot Aries for scrap in 1996. Finding her in good shape, he sailed from Charleston, South Carolina to Missouri and decided to restore her.

As of September 2025 Aries is currently located on the bank of the Gasconade River, upstream from the confluence with the Missouri River.

== See also ==
- List of patrol vessels of the United States Navy
