= USS Hercules (PHM-2) =

Patrol vessel of the United States Navy

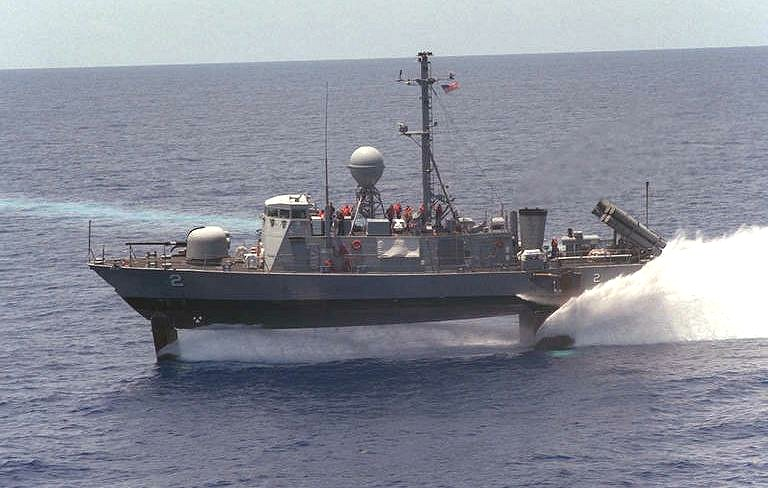
- USS Hercules

History

United States
- Name: USS Hercules
- Namesake: Hercules
- Awarded: 20 October 1977
- Builder: Boeing Marine Systems, Renton, Washington
- Laid down: 12 September 1980
- Launched: 13 April 1982
- Commissioned: 18 December 1982
- Decommissioned: 30 July 1993
- Fate: Sold for scrapping, 19 August 1996

General characteristics
- Class & type: Pegasus-class hydrofoil
- Displacement: 255 long tons (259 t) full
- Length: 133 ft (41 m)
- Beam: 28 ft (8.5 m)
- Propulsion: 2 × Mercedes-Benz marine diesels (hull-borne), 1,600 bhp (1,193 kW); 1 × General Electric LM2500 gas turbine (foil-borne), 18,000 shp (13,423 kW)
- Speed: 12 knots (22 km/h; 14 mph) hull-borne; 48 knots (89 km/h; 55 mph) foil-borne
- Complement: 4 officers, 17 enlisted
- Sensors & processing systems: LN-66 navigation radar; Mk.92 Mod 1 fire-control system
- Armament: 8 × RGM-84 Harpoon (2×4); 1 × 76mm/62 caliber Mk.75 OTO Melara

USS Hercules (PHM-2) was a United States Navy hydrofoil patrol vessel operated from 1982 to 1993. Pegasus class vessels were designed for high speed and mobility and carried a powerful armament for their size. The Hercules was named for the constellation.
