= USS Aquila (PHM-4) =

Patrol vessel of the United States Navy

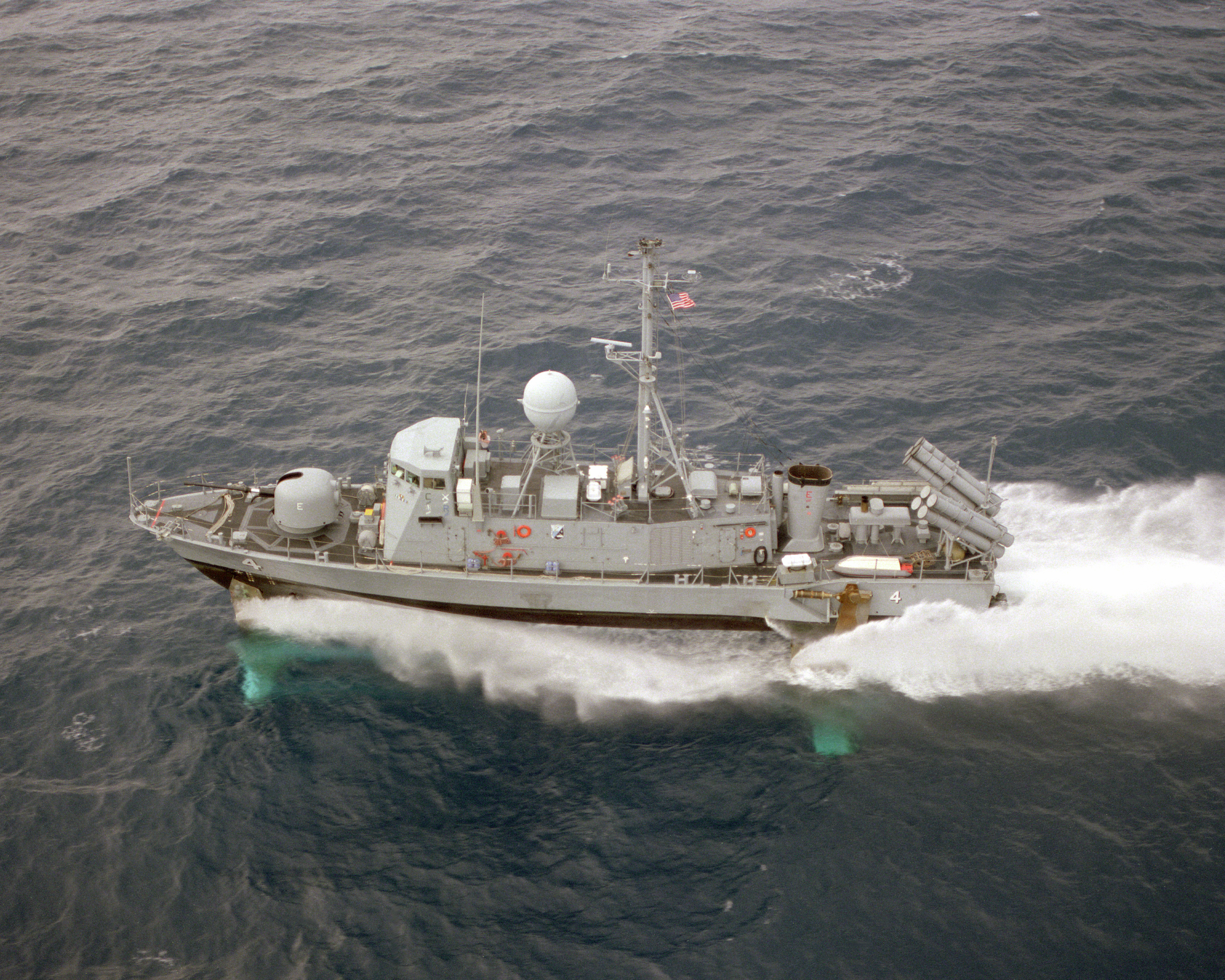
- USS Aquila

History

United States
- Name: USS Aquila
- Namesake: Aquila
- Awarded: 20 October 1977
- Builder: Boeing Marine Systems, Renton, Washington
- Laid down: 10 July 1979
- Launched: 16 September 1981
- Commissioned: 26 June 1982
- Decommissioned: 30 July 1993
- Fate: Sold for scrapping, 19 August 1996

General characteristics
- Class & type: Pegasus-class hydrofoil
- Displacement: 255 long tons (259 t) full
- Length: 133 ft (41 m)
- Beam: 28 ft (8.5 m)
- Propulsion: 2 × Mercedes-Benz marine diesels (hullborne), 1,600 bhp (1,193 kW); 1 × General Electric LM2500 gas turbine (foilborne), 18,000 shp (13,423 kW)
- Speed: 12 knots (22 km/h; 14 mph) hullborne; 48 knots (89 km/h; 55 mph) foilborne
- Complement: 4 officers, 17 enlisted
- Sensors & processing systems: LN-66 navigation radar; MK 92 Mod 1 fire-control system
- Armament: 2 × quad RGM-84 Harpoon; 1 × Mk.75 76 mm OTO Melara, 62 cal. gun

The second USS Aquila (PHM-4) was the fourth ship of her class of hydrofoils operated by the United States Navy. Pegasus-class vessels were designed for high speed and mobility, and carried a powerful (for their size) armament.

Named for the constellation, Aquila ("Eagle") was laid down on 10 July 1979 at Seattle, Washington, by Boeing Marine Systems; launched on 16 September 1981; sponsored by Mrs. John D. Bulkeley, the wife of Rear Admiral John D. Bulkeley, World War II, PT-boat hero; and commissioned at the Puget Sound Naval Shipyard on 26 June 1982.

== Service history ==
After completing her fitting out, Aquila got underway from Bremerton, Washington, on 15 July 1982 in company with Taurus (PHM-3) and Frederick (LST-1184) and shaped a course for her home port, Key West, Florida. Frederick escorted the two guided-missile hydrofoil gunboats as far as Rodman in the Canal Zone where El Paso (LKA-117) took over. Aquila and her traveling companions transited the Panama Canal on 8 August and arrived in Key West three days later. The warship spent the remainder of 1982 conducting shakedown and other training out of her base at the Trumbo Point Annex, Naval Air Station, Key West, Florida. During the first quarter of 1983, post-shakedown repairs occupied her time. That spring, Aquila embarked upon a schedule of normal training duties out of Key West that occupied her time through the summer and into all of 1983. From 10 to 20 October, she joined Taurus and Spartanburg County (LST-1192) for special operations in the Caribbean Sea.

In mid-November, Aquila and Taurus joined Aubrey Fitch (FFG-34) at Guantánamo Bay, Cuba, to test the feasibility of operating guided-missile frigates and guided-missile hydrofoil gunboats together in the same task organization. However, demands attendant to the American presence in Grenada forestalled the experiment. Aquila, Taurus, and Aubrey Fitch headed for Grenada where they performed patrol duties and relief work until the middle of December. Aquila returned to Key West on 16 December and spent the last two weeks of the year in port.

Holiday leave and upkeep ended early in January 1984, and Aquila reembarked upon normal operations out of her base at Key West. In May, the guided-missile hydrofoil gunboat added another duty to her busy training schedule, helping the Coast Guard to interdict the traffic in illicit drugs. That fall she joined Taurus in a special mission to the Caribbean coast of Central America. The two warships returned to Key West at the end of the first week in November, and Aquila resumed her program of training missions and drug traffic interdiction. She continued so occupied through the end of 1984 and during the first half of 1985. Late in July 1985, the warship began a restricted availability that lasted until the middle of October. Following post-overhaul trials, Aquila rejoined the effort against drug smugglers in mid-December.

Law enforcement duties occupied her during the first two months of 1986. In March, she carried out post-overhaul refresher training and, late in April, participated in FLEETEX 1-86 staged in the West Indies. Immediately thereafter, Aquila joined in another exercise, Operation "Ocean Venture 86," that simulated an attack on an enemy fleet attempting to force the Mona Passage between Hispaniola and Puerto Rico. At the beginning of the second week in May, the guided-missile hydrofoil gunboat returned to normal operations out of Key West. She interrupted those operations twice that summer—once early in July and again early in August—to conduct special tests with A-7E Corsair II aircraft for the Chief of Naval Operations. Otherwise, she carried out normal duties from her base at Key West through the end of the year.

In April 1991, The USS Aquila hit a whale that suddenly breached in front of PHM-4 while she was flying on her foils in the Straits of Florida. The front foil skipped off the back of the whale, while the stern foils stuck the whale cutting it into 3 pieces. The whale strike caused tremendous stress on the hull; visible warping of the stern hull section could be easily seen. Several crew men including the Captain required medical attention and evacuation. The event caused the radios to fall on the radioman resulting in loss of communications. The captain issued a mayday using a handheld radio. The engine room was flooding due to the raw water intake being broke loose from the hull. Being the largest compartment the pumps could not maintain sufficient removal of water. A coast guard falcon dropped two P250s which saved the ship. Additionally the impact caused such force that the rafts self deployed in mid air and floated next to the ship.

Aquila was decommissioned in 1993 and sold in 1996.
