= USS Pegasus (PHM-1) =

Hydrofoil of the US Navy

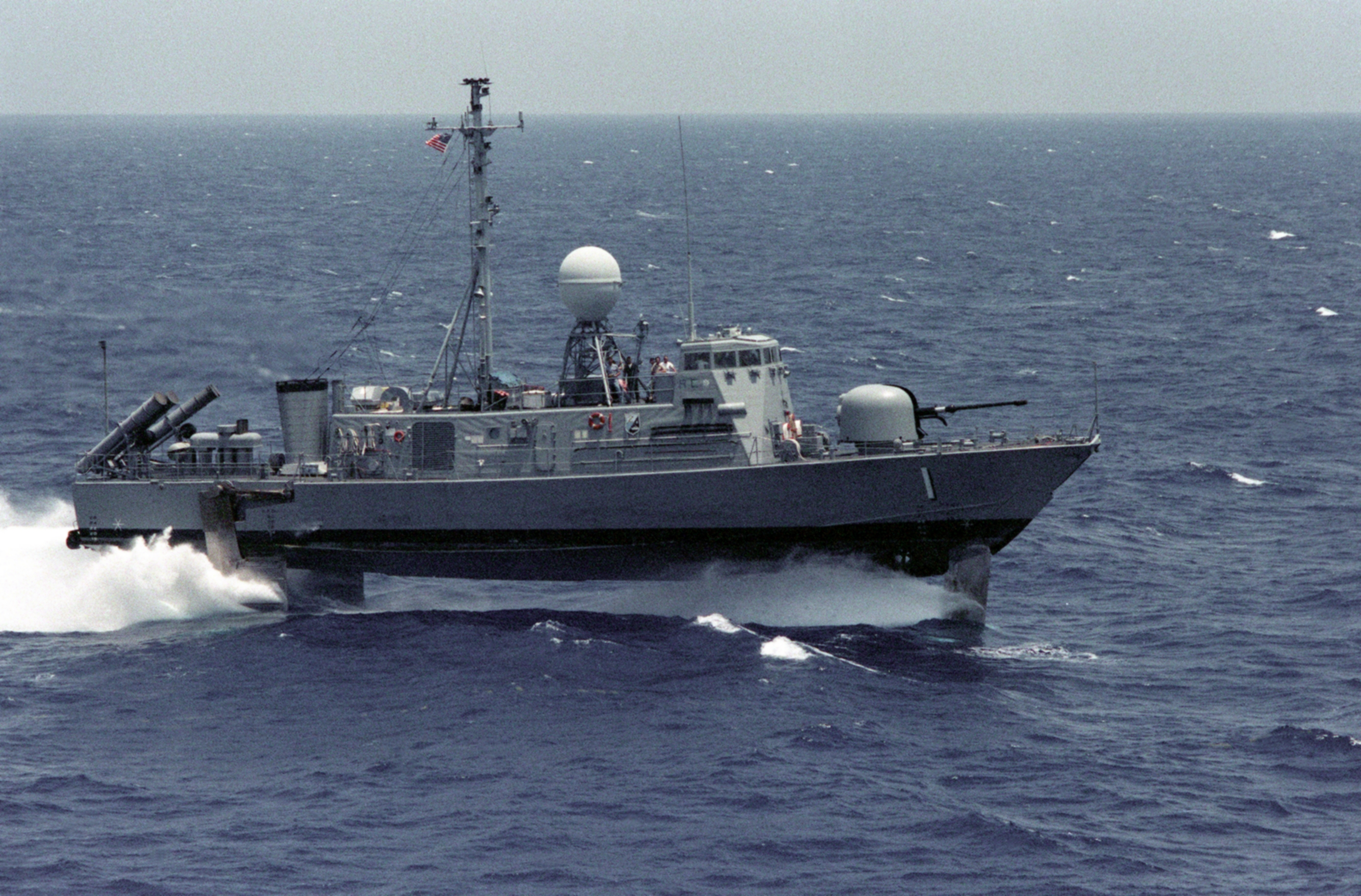
- USS Pegasus

History

United States
- Name: Pegasus
- Namesake: Pegasus
- Awarded: 1 February 1973
- Builder: Boeing Marine Systems, Renton, Washington
- Laid down: 10 May 1973
- Launched: 9 November 1974
- Commissioned: 9 July 1977
- Decommissioned: 30 July 1993
- Stricken: 30 July 1993
- Home port: Key West, Florida
- Fate: Sold for scrapping, 19 August 1996

General characteristics
- Class & type: Pegasus-class hydrofoil
- Displacement: 178 long tons (181 t) light; 248 long tons (252 t) full
- Length: 131.2 ft (40.0 m)
- Beam: 28.2 ft (8.6 m)
- Draft: 23.2 feet (7.1 m) hullborne; 8.8 ft (2.7 m) foilborne
- Installed power: 2 × Mercedes-Benz marine diesels (hull-borne), 1,600 bhp (1,193 kW); 1 × General Electric LM2500 gas turbine (foil-borne), 18,000 shp (13,423 kW)
- Propulsion: 2 × water jets (hull-borne); 1 × water jet (foil-borne)
- Speed: 12 knots (22 km/h; 14 mph) hull-borne; 48 knots (89 km/h; 55 mph) foil-borne
- Range: 750–1,200 nmi (1,390–2,220 km)
- Complement: 4 officers, 17 enlisted
- Sensors & processing systems: LN-66 navigation radar; Mk.94 Mod 1 fire-control system
- Armament: 1×76 mm (3 in)/62 caliber Mk.75 OTO-Melara gun; 8 RGM-84 Harpoon (2×4)

USS Pegasus (PHM-1) was the lead ship of her class of hydrofoils operated by the United States Navy. Pegasus-class vessels were designed for high speed and mobility, and carried a powerful armament for their size.

== Naming ==
SECNAV Notice 5030 originally gave the ship the name Delphinus after a small constellation in the Northern Celestial Hemisphere, on 15 February 1974. It was quickly realized in service that she could be nicknamed 'dull penis,' so Secretary of the Navy J. William Middendorf issued a new notice on 1 April 1974, renaming her Pegasus for the constellation Pegasus. In service it earned the nickname 'Pegasorous'. As this vessel was constructed several years before the rest of the class, there are some minor differences, notably in the fire-control systems of the respective craft.

== Construction ==
Pegasus was laid down on 10 May 1973, by Boeing Marine Systems, in Seattle, Washington. She was launched on 9 November 1974, and commissioned on 9 July 1977.

== Purpose ==
Pegasus-class hydrofoils were designed to operate offensively against hostile surface combatants (equipped with Harpoon anti-surface missiles) and conduct surveillance, screening and special operations in coastal waters. The six PHMs of the Pegasus class formed a single squadron which operated from Key West. They were the Navy's fastest ships when foil borne. Their most notable applications were participation in the 1983 invasion of Grenada and counter-narcotics; they were credited with about 30% of all seizures from 1982 to 1992. They never participated in a major naval mission and remained relegated to Caribbean deployments during their service life

== Project ==
The PHM project was started in early 1970, by CNO Admiral Elmo Zumwalt, in an effort to increase the Navy's number of surface combatants. The project called for a cost-effective hydrofoil boat designed to operate in coastal waters and equipped to fulfill the missions of destroyers and frigates in those areas so that these larger ships could be deployed to areas where they are needed most. These missions included surface surveillance as well as immediate responses such as surface-to-surface missiles (SSM) to any hostile actions conducted by enemy navies.

The PHM project was not only a US project. Other countries involved included Italy, Germany, Canada and Great Britain. During the initial phase of the project it was planned to build up to 100 hydrofoil boats for the NATO navies.

Following the retirement of Admiral Zumwalt, the Navy reduced funding for the PHM project. Due to the lack of money it was decided to use available funds for larger fleet units instead. The increasing costs of the PHM project finally resulted in the completion of only one PHM, Pegasus, although the construction of this ship had to be stopped for a while in 1974, again due to the lack of funds. At that time, the ship was only 20% completed.

Although PHM 3 - 6 had already been funded in FY 74 (PHM 2 in FY 73), construction of these ships did not start until 6 April 1977, when Secretary of Defense Harold Brown announced that the whole project, with the exception of Pegasus, was suspended. Congress now insisted on the completion of the last five ships since they had already been funded. In August 1977, Secretary of Defense Brown reactivated the PHM project and construction of the ships resumed, but the four countries involved in the project had lost interest in the PHM program.

The last of the US Navy's hydrofoil boats was commissioned in 1982.

== Collision ==
On 30 September 1981, Pegasus was involved in a collision with Newport, but was later repaired.

== See also ==
- Hydrofoil

== Bibliography ==
- "Pegasus (PHM-1)". NavSource.
- Duff, Karl (18 October 2011). "USS PEGASUS: An Important Name Change". Naval Historical Foundation.
- "Pegasus (PHM 1)". Naval Vessel Register. 1 January 1990.
