= USS Flagstaff =

Gunboat of the United States Navy and Coast Guard

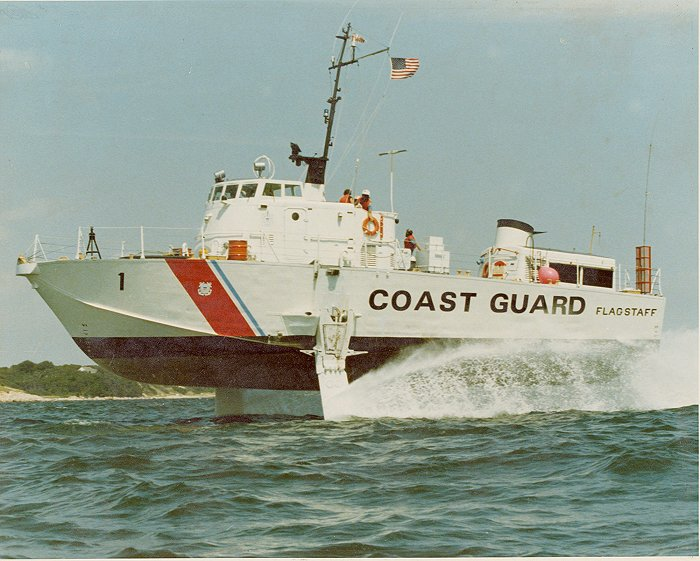
- As USCGC Flagstaff (WPBH 1) undergoing Coast Guard evaluations.

History

United States
- Name: USS Flagstaff
- Namesake: Flagstaff, Arizona
- Laid down: 1 June 1966
- Launched: 15 July 1966
- Christened: by Zilpha A. Wheeler, wife of Flagstaff, Arizona Mayor Rollin Wheeler
- Commissioned: 14 September 1968 (USN); 8 November 1974 (USCG on loan from USN); 2 March 1977 (USCG)
- Decommissioned: 30 September 1978
- Fate: Returned to USN and scrapped

General characteristics
- Class & type: none
- Type: Hydrofoil gunboat
- Displacement: 67 long tons (68 t)
- Length: 73 ft (22 m); 82 ft (25 m) length overall
- Beam: 21 ft 6 in (6.55 m)
- Draft: 4 ft 4 in (1.32 m) (foils retracted); 18 ft (5.5 m)(foils extended)
- Propulsion: Rolls-Royce Tyne gas turbine with supercavitating propeller (foil-borne); 2 × General Motors diesel engines with water-jet pumps (hull-borne)
- Speed: Max: at least 45 kn (52 mph; 83 km/h) (foil-borne)
- Complement: 12 (1974); 13 (1977)
- Sensors & processing systems: Navigation-type radar
- Armament: 1 × 40 mm Bofors AA gun, 1 × 81 mm (3.2 in) mortar, 2 × .50 in (12.7 mm) M2 Browning machine gun

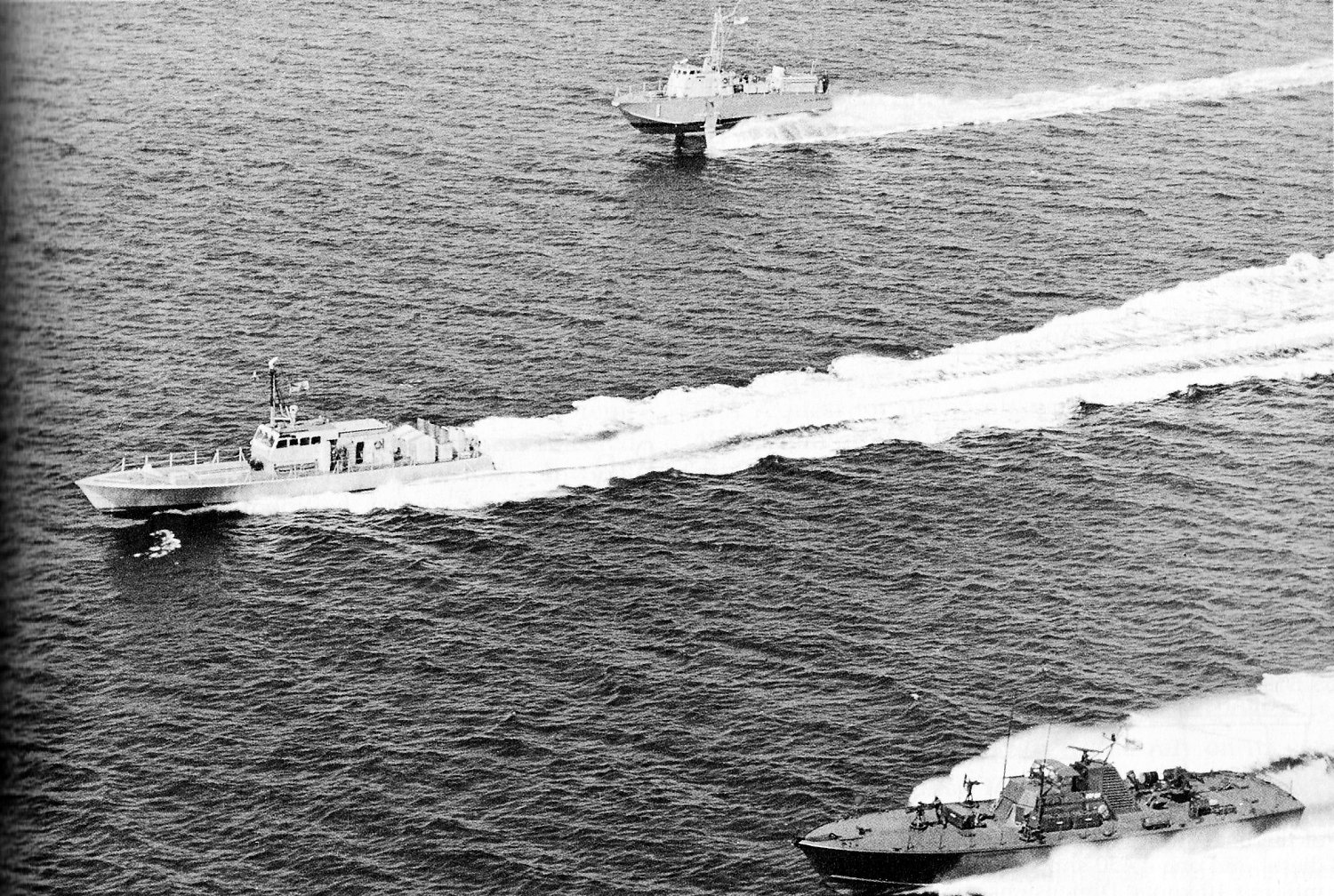
Flagstaff top, experimental coastal patrol and interdiction craft at center, and the PTF-23 bottom, off the coast of southern California in August 1974

USS Flagstaff (PGH-1) was the only Flagstaff-class patrol gunboat (hydrofoil) and was acquired by the United States Navy because of her relatively low cost and very high speed. She was later loaned by the Navy to the U.S. Coast Guard, as USCGC Flagstaff (WPBH-1). The Coast Guard's interest in the craft was the craft's speed and its ability to interdict smugglers and other suspicious craft approaching the U.S. coast.

== History of evaluation of high speed craft ==
In the mid-1970s, the Coast Guard explored options to replace the aging 95 ft (29 m) cutters. There was also considerable interest in developing new "high-speed ways" to combat narcotics smuggling by sea, conduct search and rescue operations, fisheries enforcement, and marine environmental protection. The Coast Guard, of course, looked for the most inexpensive way to test new platforms and when the Navy offered the use of some of their hydrofoils at "virtually no cost", the Coast Guard jumped on the opportunity. The Navy loaned the Coast Guard both USS Flagstaff (PGH-1) and USS High Point (PCH-1) for a short period of time beginning in late 1974. Flagstaff was scheduled for evaluation first and High Point was scheduled for evaluation in early 1975. While under Coast Guard ownership, Flagstaff was armed only with small arms.

== Service with the U.S. Navy in Vietnam ==
Flagstaff was developed by the Navy as an experimental vessel under project SCB 252 and was built by Grumman Aerospace Corporation of Bethpage, New York. She was delivered to the Navy in September 1968. After an operational evaluation period, she was deployed to South Vietnam with Tucumcari. The two ships formed Coastal Squadron 3, and were based in Cam Ranh Bay. She conducted patrol missions there until 1970. Flagstaff and Tucumcari were too mechanically complex for the repair facilities in Vietnam, and as a result were ultimately withdrawn from combat. Upon her return to the U.S. in 1970, she was assigned to the Amphibious Forces of the Pacific Fleet where she participated in numerous readiness trials and training exercises and was also used as a test-bed for various craft subsystems, such as the Navy's Advanced Hydrofoil Development Program.

== Evaluation of the craft by the U.S. Coast Guard ==
Both Flagstaff and High Point were scheduled for evaluation by the Coast Guard Hydrofoil Test and Evaluation Team, under guidance from the Coast Guard Research and Development Center, which was formed on 15 August 1974 and remained in existence until 6 May 1975. The Coast Guard commissioned Flagstaff on 8 November 1974 after having her hull painted white and the Coast Guard hull-stripe added. Her first commanding officer was Lieutenant Douglas F. Gehring, USCG. She operated out of San Diego, California, and other Californian ports during the Coast Guard's evaluation.

== Search and rescue operation ==
During her evaluation, Flagstaff was involved in a number of search and rescue cases. She was dispatched from Long Beach, California, to investigate a report of a burning boat about 50 mi (80 km) away. In one hour, the ship was on scene and quickly located a family of three who had jumped into the water to escape the flash fire that had engulfed the cabin of their 40 ft (12 m) boat. Flagstaff's speed in arriving on scene was "a major factor in saving the lives of the three".

== Problems encountered during test and evaluation ==
Ultimately, the evaluation demonstrated that she showed promise in both anti-smuggling operations and as a rapid response search and rescue vessel. But machinery breakdowns, a lack of spare parts for her Rolls-Royce turbine, and a collision with a gray whale off the Point Loma Lighthouse that caused $250,000 in damage to her aft strut gearing assembly (and killed the whale) soured the Coast Guard's hopes for her use. It was continually noted in reports that her operation was more like that of an airplane than a ship, particularly her wiring systems which were similar to the wiring used in aircraft. Concerns about weight, habitability, fuel consumption, and overall costs were also prevalent. Her evaluation period ended on 18 February 1975 and she was returned to the Navy.

== Second assessment and evaluation by the Coast Guard ==
The Coast Guard once again acquired Flagstaff from the Navy on 29 September 1976 in San Diego, California, for further evaluation "in a fully operational environment". She was transported to the U.S. East Coast for testing in the "adverse weather conditions" that prevailed in the waters off the New England in the hope of having her conduct actual operational missions. She was home-ported at Woods Hole, Massachusetts. The emphasis for this evaluation was to test her capabilities to enforce the new 200 mi (320 km) fisheries economic zone, in addition to the traditional Coast Guard missions. The testing period was initially set to last 12 months.

== In-commission special status ==
After arriving on the East Coast, she required numerous repairs to her aging machinery, which was done in Boston, Massachusetts. She was placed "In-Commission-Special" status as a Coast Guard cutter (WPBH-1) on 2 March 1977 after again receiving the Coast Guard livery. Her commanding officer was Lt. Terrance Hart, USCG. Two days later, she transited from Boston to Woods Hole. She was under the operational control of the First District and the plan was to have her operate as a "normal district resource." It was thought that such use would permit comparison of her capabilities to the other District resources, i.e. HH-52As, HU-16Es, and surface craft. USCGC Flagstaff was placed "In-Commission Active" status on 17 July 1977.

== Disappointing test and evaluation results ==
Her use this time, however, was more problematic than the first testing period in 1974. She continually suffered mechanical breakdowns, including problems with her turbine, and the lack of spare parts forced the Coast Guard to extend her period of evaluation from 12 months to 16 months. Her crew spent more of their time attempting to repair her rather than patrolling and one officer likened her operation to that of an aircraft, requiring frequent maintenance; the difference being that an aircraft has a flight crew to operate the aircraft and a maintenance crew for its upkeep. The crew of Flagstaff, however, had to do both, and were "overwhelmed with the maintenance workload," and their morale consequently suffered. From 26 May 1977 – 27 October 1977, Flagstaff only managed 305.2 hours of operating time, including only 71.6 hours of foil-borne time. In March 1978, she suffered a transmission failure and the nail in her coffin was the deterioration of her turbine. The only solution to the latter problem was to replace the turbine, and the cost of that was prohibitive. The Coast Guard decided to decommission her due to "the high cost of repairs and the fact that the CG feels sufficient information has been gained from the E.P. [Evaluation Period]." During this period of inoperability, she was located at the Coast Guard's aids to navigation station in Bristol, Rhode Island.

== Decommissioned and returned to the Navy ==
Flagstaff was decommissioned at Woods Hole on 30 September 1978 and returned to the Navy. The Coast Guard noted, "[S]ufficient information on the use of hydrofoils has been gathered from the evaluation program." The escalating costs of repair, and the fact that she needed an engine replacement too, figured into the decision to return her to the Navy. She was later surplussed and found in a boatyard in Tuckahoe, NJ. around 1999. Flagstaff was sand blasted, plumbing repaired, and electrical system checked. The original turbine was in place but without diesel motor and water pump for standard operation. She went up for sale at $30,000.00 and was bought by company in Arkansas. Where the vessel is located and her present condition is unknown.

== Awards ==
- National Defense Service Medal
- Vietnam Service Medal
- Republic of Vietnam Campaign Medal
