= Olpenitz =

Coordinates: 54°39′44″N 9°59′29″E

Olpenitz (Danish: Olpenæs) is a part of the town Kappeln in Schleswig-Holstein, Germany, at the mouth of the Schlei firth to the Baltic Sea.

From 1964 until 2006, Olpenitz was the site of one of three major naval bases of the German Navy in the Baltic Sea. Naval units positioned in Olpenitz included three squadrons of minesweepers and minehunters and various auxiliary vessels. The base was closed end of 2006, with the last vessels being reallocated to Kiel.

Nowadays it is a seaside resort that is still under construction
