= USS Taurus (PHM-3) =

Patrol vessel of the United States Navy

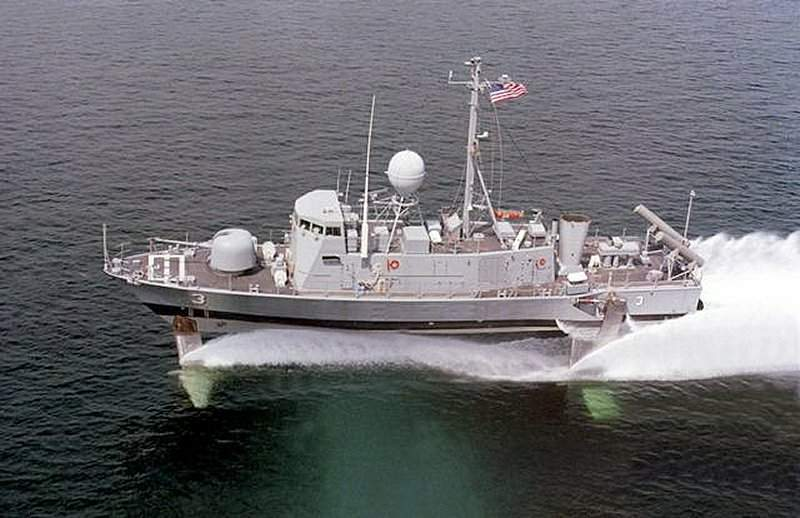
- USS Taurus

History

United States
- Name: USS Taurus
- Namesake: Taurus
- Awarded: 20 October 1977
- Builder: Boeing Marine Systems, Renton, Washington
- Laid down: 30 January 1979
- Launched: 8 May 1981
- Commissioned: 10 October 1981
- Decommissioned: 30 July 1993
- Home port: Key West, Fl
- Motto: Ad Astra (Latin) "To the stars"
- Fate: Sold for scrapping, 19 August 1996

General characteristics
- Class & type: Pegasus-class hydrofoil
- Displacement: 255 long tons (259 t) full
- Length: 133 ft (41 m)
- Beam: 28 ft (8.5 m)
- Propulsion: 2 × Mercedes-Benz marine diesels (hullborne), 1,600 bhp (1,193 kW); 1 × General Electric LM2500 gas turbine (foilborne), 18,000 shp (13,423 kW)
- Speed: 12 knots (22 km/h; 14 mph) hullborne; 48 knots (89 km/h; 55 mph) foilborne
- Complement: 4 officers, 17 enlisted
- Sensors & processing systems: LN-66 navigation radar; MK 92 Mod 1 fire-control system
- Armament: 2 × quad RGM-84 Harpoon; 1 × Mk.75 76 mm OTO Melara, 62 cal. gun

USS Taurus (PHM-3) was the third ship of her class of hydrofoils operated by the United States Navy. Pegasus class vessels were designed for high speed and mobility, and carried a powerful (for their size) armament. The ship was named for the constellation Taurus.

In November 1972, The United States, Germany and Italy signed a Memorandum of Understanding to share the cost of the development of a Patrol Missile Hydrofoil. This brought about the building of the Pegasus class . The Taurus was the first production model.

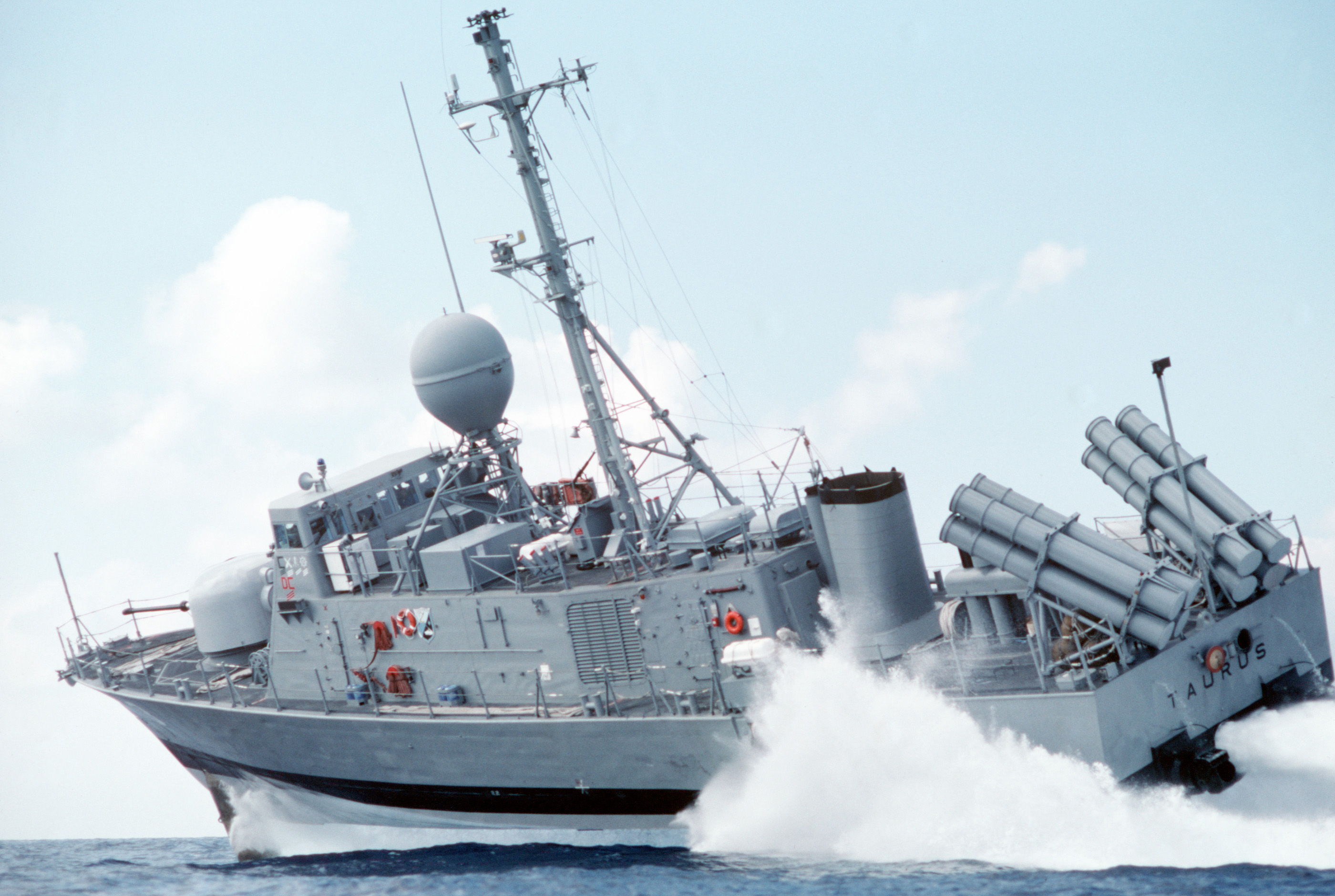
Taurus makes a high-speed turn

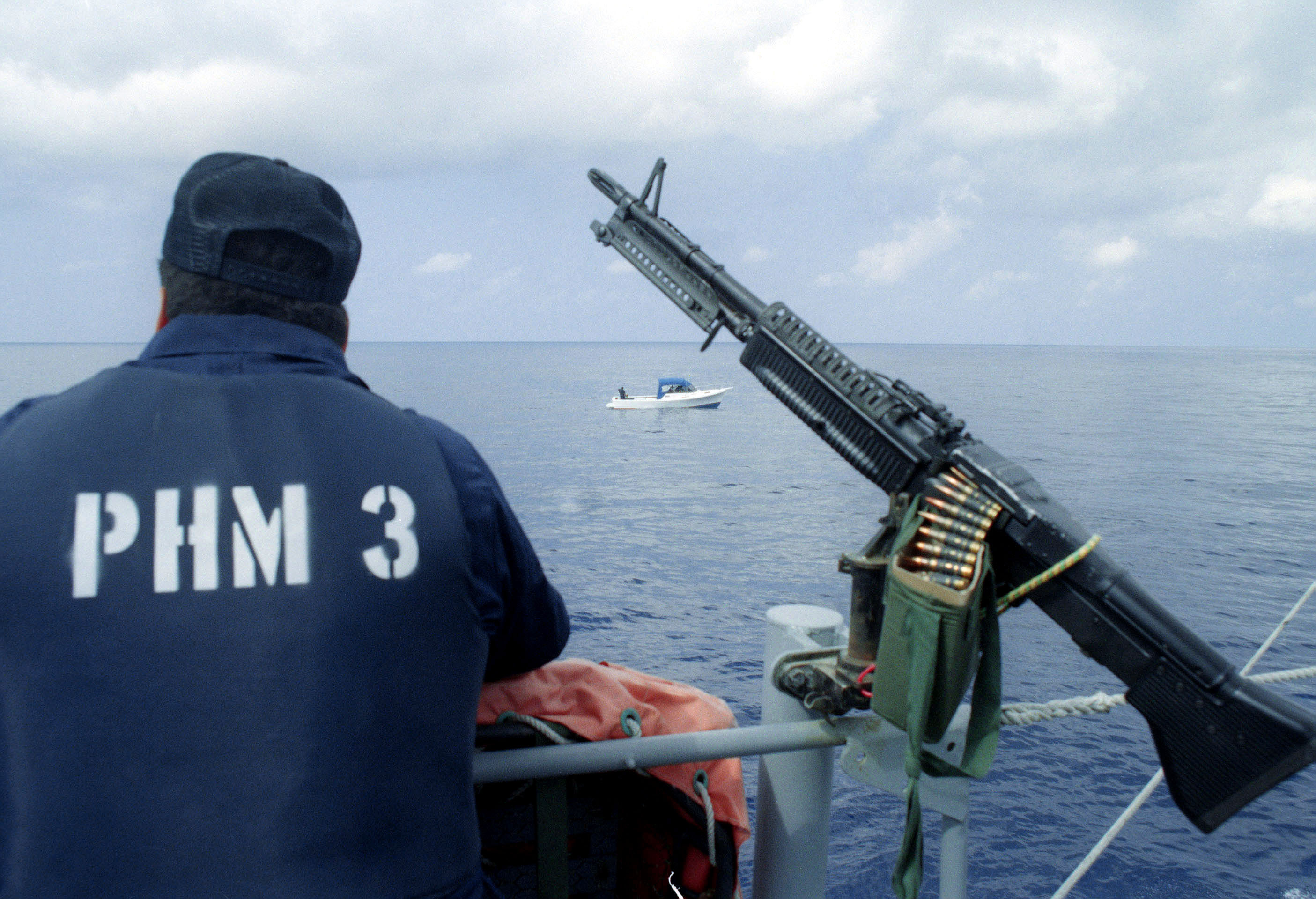
A sailor aboard the patrol combatant missile hydrofoil USS Taurus (PHM 3) stands beside an M60 machine gun as he keeps an eye on a small craft that was stopped after being spotted unusually far from shore

== See also ==
- List of patrol vessels of the United States Navy
