= USS High Point =

U.S. Navy patrol craft

Coordinates: 46.198616°N 123.759163°W

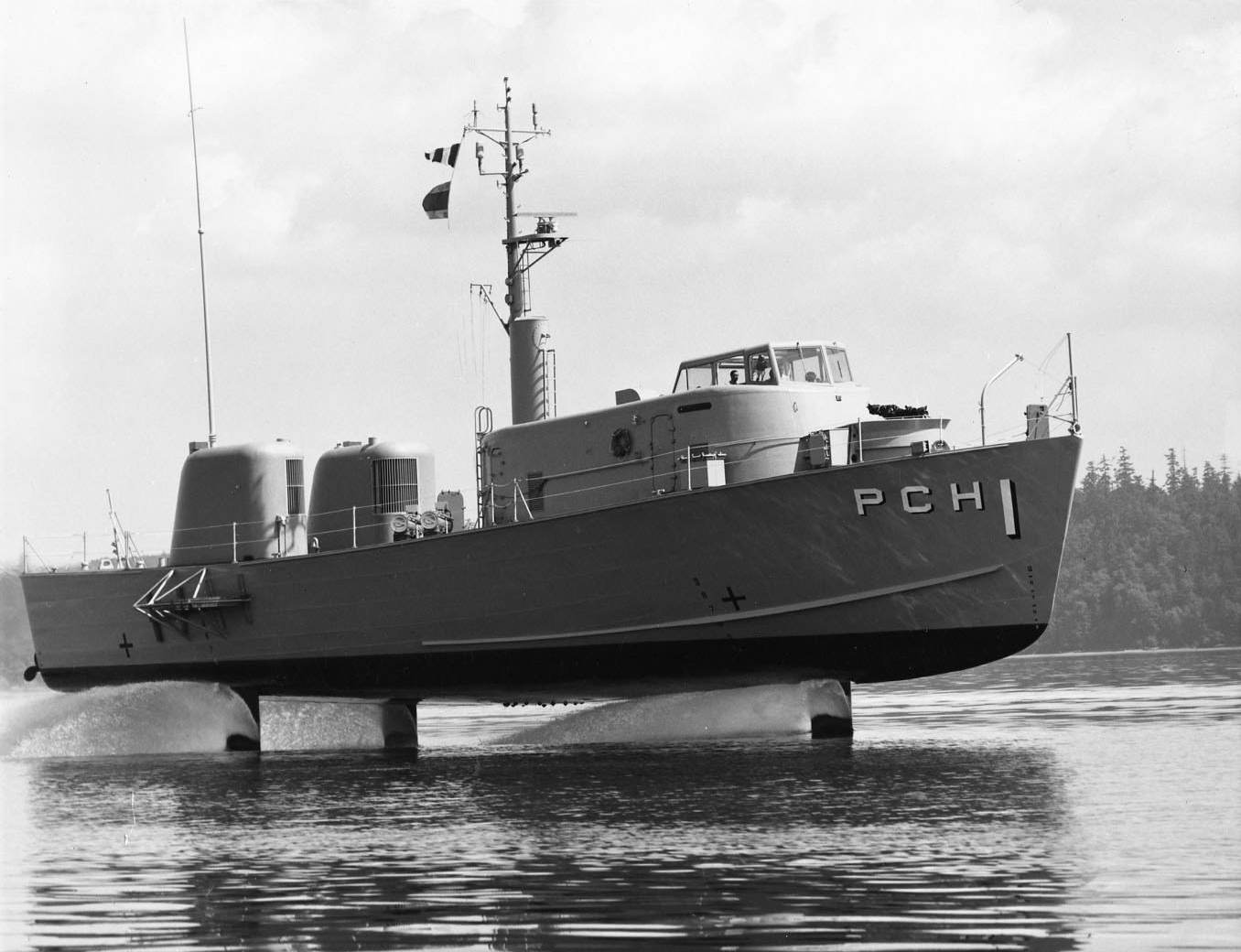
- USS High Point underway

United States Navy
- Name: USS High Point
- Namesake: High Point, North Carolina
- Awarded: 14 June 1960
- Builder: J.M. Martinac Shipbuilding Corp.
- Laid down: 27 February 1961
- Launched: 17 August 1962
- Commissioned: 15 August 1963
- Decommissioned: March 1975
- Stricken: 1980
- Fate: Transferred to U.S. Coast Guard 4 April 1975
- Acquired: Transferred from U.S. Coast Guard May 1975
- Stricken: 1980
- Fate: Sold 2002

United States Coast Guard
- Name: USCGC High Point
- Namesake: Previous name retained
- Acquired: 4 April 1975
- Commissioned: April 1975
- Decommissioned: 5 May 1975
- Stricken: 1980
- Fate: Transferred to U.S. Navy May 1975

United States
- Name: High Point
- Namesake: Previous name retained
- Acquired: 2002
- Fate: Scrapped August 2023

General characteristics
- Class & type: High Point-class patrol craft
- Displacement: 110 Tons
- Length: 115 ft (35 m)
- Beam: 32 ft (9.8 m)
- Draft: 17 ft (5.2 m) with foils down
- Propulsion: General Electric turbine (foil-borne)
- Speed: Maximum 48 knots (foil-borne)
- Complement: 13 officers and enlisted

USS High Point (PCH-1) was a High Point-class patrol craft of the United States Navy in commission from 1963 to 1975. She subsequently was in commission in the United States Coast Guard briefly in 1975.

== Construction and commissioning ==
High Point was the first of a series of hydrofoil craft designed to evaluate the performance of hydrofoils for the U.S. Navy. The design of High Point began in April 1958 under project SCB 202. She had three submerged foils containing propulsion nacelles and propellers, and was also capable of riding on her hull like a more conventional ship.

High Point was launched on 17 August 1962 by J. M. Martinac Shipbuilding Corporation in Tacoma, Washington as a sub-contractor to Boeing in Seattle, Washington, at a cost of $2.08 million, together with Vickers, Inc. Marine and Ordnance Department in Waterbury, Connecticut, which provided hydraulic components and controls. Electronic equipment aboard, including automatic stabilization equipment and a dead reckoning navigation system, was developed and manufactured by the United Aircraft Corporation Hamilton Standard Division. She was commissioned on 15 August 1963 with Lieutenant H. G. Billerbeck in charge. She was named after High Point, North Carolina.

== Service history ==
=== U.S. Navy ===
High Point carried out tests in Puget Sound from 1963 to 1967. On her foils, she obtained very high speeds, and the U.S. Navy evaluated her for mobility and flexibility as an antisubmarine warfare vessel. The U.S. Navy decommissioned her in March 1975.

=== U.S. Coast Guard ===
On 4 April 1975, the U.S. Navy transferred High Point to the United States Coast Guard, which acquired her to evaluate hydrofoil characteristics for use in law enforcement, search and rescue, and marine environmental protection missions. After a first round of tests in Puget Sound, the Coast Guard transferred her to San Francisco, California. While she was attempting to moor at Naval Station Treasure Island in San Francisco Bay, her turbine exploded. The $300,000 cost of repair was not in the Coast Guard budget, so the Coast Guard decommissioned her on 5 May 1975 and transferred her back to the U.S. Navy.

== Later disposition ==
High Point was stricken from the Naval Vessel Register sometime in 1980. A private owner intent on restoring her purchased her in 2002, but the effort did not succeed. In 2005 Terence Orme purchased her to save her from being scrapped. By 2009, she was moored at Tongue Point near Astoria, Oregon, where volunteers were restoring the vessel for use as a museum. These efforts were abandoned. In 2021, a private individual purchased High Point and began to restore her at Astoria with the goal of making her seaworthy once again.

When corrosion was found below her waterline, USS High Point was scrapped in August of 2023.
