= Hull classification symbol =

US naval inventory classification system

Ships of the United States Navy

Ships in current service
- Current ships

Ships grouped alphabetically
- A–B; C; D–F; G–H; I–K; L; M; N–O; P; Q–R; S; T–V; W–Z

Ships grouped by type
- Aircraft carriers; Airships; Amphibious warfare ships; Auxiliaries; Battlecruisers; Battleships; Cruisers; Destroyers; Destroyer escorts; Destroyer leaders; Escort carriers; Frigates; Hospital ships; Littoral combat ships; Mine warfare vessels; Monitors; Oilers; Patrol vessels; Registered civilian vessels; Sailing frigates; Steam frigates; Steam gunboats; Ships of the line; Sloops of war; Submarines; Torpedo boats; Torpedo retrievers; Unclassified miscellaneous; Yard and district craft

The United States Navy, United States Coast Guard, and United States National Oceanic and Atmospheric Administration (NOAA) use a hull classification symbol (sometimes called hull code or hull number) to identify their ships by type and by individual ship within a type. The system is analogous to the pennant number system that the Royal Navy and other European and Commonwealth navies use.

== History ==
=== United States Navy ===
The U.S. Navy began to assign unique Naval Registry Identification Numbers to its ships in the 1890s. The system was a simple one in which each ship received a number which was appended to its ship type, fully spelled out, and added parenthetically after the ship's name when deemed necessary to avoid confusion between ships. Under this system, for example, the battleship Indiana was USS Indiana (Battleship No. 1), the cruiser Olympia was USS Olympia (Cruiser No. 6), and so on. Beginning in 1907, some ships also were referred to alternatively by single-letter or three-letter codes—for example, USS Indiana (Battleship No. 1) could be referred to as USS Indiana (B-1) and USS Olympia (Cruiser No. 6) could also be referred to as USS Olympia (C-6), while USS Pennsylvania (Armored Cruiser No. 4) could be referred to as USS Pennsylvania (ACR-4). However, rather than replacing it, these codes coexisted and were used interchangeably with the older system until the modern system was instituted on 17 July 1920.

During World War I, the U.S. Navy acquired large numbers of privately owned and commercial ships and craft for use as patrol vessels, mine warfare vessels, and various types of naval auxiliary ships, some of them with identical names. To keep track of them all, the Navy assigned unique identifying numbers to them. Those deemed appropriate for patrol work received section patrol numbers (SP), while those intended for other purposes received "identification numbers", generally abbreviated "Id. No." or "ID;" some ships and craft changed from an SP to an ID number or vice versa during their careers, without their unique numbers themselves changing, and some ships and craft assigned numbers in anticipation of naval service were never acquired by the Navy. The SP/ID numbering sequence was unified and continuous, with no SP number repeated in the ID series or vice versa so that there could not be, for example, both an "SP-435" and an "Id. No. 435". The SP and ID numbers were used parenthetically after each boat's or ship's name to identify it; although this system pre-dated the modern hull classification system and its numbers were not referred to at the time as "hull codes" or "hull numbers," it was used in a similar manner to today's system and can be considered its precursor.

=== United States Revenue Cutter Service and United States Coast Guard ===
The United States Revenue Cutter Service, which merged with the United States Lifesaving Service in January 1915 to form the modern United States Coast Guard, began following the Navy's lead in the 1890s, with its cutters having parenthetical numbers called Naval Registry Identification Numbers following their names, such as (Cutter No. 1), etc. This persisted until the Navy's modern hull classification system's introduction in 1920, which included Coast Guard ships and craft.

=== United States Coast and Geodetic Survey ===
Like the U.S. Navy, the United States Coast and Geodetic Survey – a uniformed seagoing service of the United States Government and a predecessor of the National Oceanic and Atmospheric Administration (NOAA) – adopted a hull number system for its fleet in the 20th century. Its largest vessels, "Category I" oceanographic survey ships, were classified as "ocean survey ships" and given the designation "OSS". Intermediate-sized "Category II" oceanographic survey ships received the designation "MSS" for "medium survey ship," and smaller "Category III" oceanographic survey ships were given the classification "CSS" for "coastal survey ship." A fourth designation, "ASV" for "auxiliary survey vessel," included even smaller vessels. In each case, a particular ship received a unique designation based on its classification and a unique hull number separated by a space rather than a hyphen; for example, the third Coast and Geodetic Survey ship named Pioneer was an ocean survey ship officially known as USC&GS Pioneer (OSS 31). The Coast and Geodetic Survey's system persisted after the creation of NOAA in 1970, when NOAA took control of the Survey's fleet, but NOAA later changed to its modern hull classification system.

=== United States Fish and Wildlife Service ===
The Fish and Wildlife Service, created in 1940 and reorganized as the United States Fish and Wildlife Service (USFWS) in 1956, adopted a hull number system for its fisheries research ships and patrol vessels. It consisted of "FWS" followed by a unique identifying number. In 1970, NOAA took control of the seagoing ships of the USFWS's Bureau of Commercial Fisheries, and as part of the NOAA fleet they were assigned new hull numbers beginning with "FRV," for Fisheries Research Vessel, followed by a unique identifying number. They eventually were renumbered under the modern NOAA hull number system.

=== United States Lighthouse Service ===
Vessels commissioned by the United States Lighthouse Service (USLHS) were originally not given unique names or hull numbers. Instead, names were exchanged when a new vessel was assigned to a station. Lightships first received the hull code "LS" before being replaced by "LV" (lightvessel). When the USLHS was absorbed by the U.S. Coast Guard in 1939, lightships were reassigned "WAL" for "anchored light" and "WLV" using the Coast Guard's "W" prefix. Finally, all lightships took the "WLV" designation after 1965 until the entire fleet was retired.

== The modern hull classification system ==
=== United States Navy ===
The U.S. Navy instituted its modern hull classification system on 17 July 1920, doing away with section patrol numbers, "identification numbers", and the other numbering systems described above. In the new system, all hull classification symbols are at least two letters; for basic types the symbol is the first letter of the type name, doubled, except for aircraft carriers.

The combination of symbol and hull number identifies a modern Navy ship uniquely. A heavily modified or re-purposed ship may receive a new symbol, and either retain the hull number or receive a new one. For example, the heavy gun cruiser USS Boston (CA-69) was converted to a gun/missile cruiser, changing the hull number to CAG-1. Also, the system of symbols has changed a number of times both since it was introduced in 1907 and since the modern system was instituted in 1920, so ships' symbols sometimes change without anything being done to the physical ship.

Hull numbers are assigned by classification. Duplication between, but not within, classifications is permitted. Hence, CV-1 was the aircraft carrier USS Langley and BB-1 was the battleship USS Indiana.

Ship types and classifications have come and gone over the years, and many of the symbols listed below are not presently in use. The Naval Vessel Register maintains an online database of U.S. Navy ships showing which symbols are presently in use.

After World War II until 1975, the U.S. Navy defined a "frigate" as a type of surface warship larger than a destroyer and smaller than a cruiser. In other navies, such a ship generally was referred to as a "flotilla leader", or "destroyer leader". Hence the U.S. Navy's use of "DL" for "frigate" prior to 1975, while "frigates" in other navies were smaller than destroyers and more like what the U.S. Navy termed a "destroyer escort", "ocean escort", or "DE". The United States Navy 1975 ship reclassification of cruisers, frigates, and ocean escorts brought U.S. Navy classifications into line with other nations' classifications, at least cosmetically in terms of terminology, and eliminated the perceived "cruiser gap" with the Soviet Navy by redesignating the former "frigates" as "cruisers".

==== Military Sealift Command ====
If a U.S. Navy ship's hull classification symbol begins with "T-", it is part of the Military Sealift Command, has a primarily civilian crew, and is a United States Naval Ship (USNS) in non-commissioned service – as opposed to a commissioned United States Ship (USS) with an all-military crew.

=== United States Coast Guard ===
If a ship's hull classification symbol begins with "W", it is a commissioned cutter of the United States Coast Guard. Until 1965, the Coast Guard used U.S. Navy hull classification codes, prepending a "W" to their beginning. In 1965, it retired some of the less mission-appropriate Navy-based classifications and developed new ones of its own, most notably WHEC for "high endurance cutter" and WMEC for "medium endurance cutter".

=== National Oceanic and Atmospheric Administration ===
The National Oceanic and Atmospheric Administration (NOAA), a component of the United States Department of Commerce, includes the National Oceanic and Atmospheric Administration Commissioned Officer Corps (or "NOAA Corps"), one of the eight uniformed services of the United States, and operates a fleet of seagoing research and survey ships. The NOAA fleet also uses a hull classification symbol system, which it also calls "hull numbers," for its ships.

After NOAA took over the former fleets of the U.S. Coast and Geodetic Survey and the U.S. Fish and Wildlife Service Bureau of Commercial Fisheries in 1970, it initially retained the Coast and Geodetic Survey's hull-number designations for its survey ships and adopted hull numbers beginning with "FRV", for "Fisheries Research Vessel", for its fisheries research ships. It later adopted a new system of ship classification, which it still uses today. In its modern system, the NOAA fleet is divided into two broad categories, research ships and survey ships. The research ships, which include oceanographic and fisheries research vessels, are given hull numbers beginning with "R", while the survey ships, generally hydrographic survey vessels, receive hull numbers beginning with "S". The letter is followed by a three-digit number; the first digit indicates the NOAA "class" (i.e., size) of the vessel, which NOAA assigns based on the ship's gross tonnage and horsepower, while the next two digits combine with the first digit to create a unique three-digit identifying number for the ship.

Generally, each NOAA hull number is written with a space between the letter and the three-digit number, as in, for example, NOAAS Nancy Foster (R 352) or NOAAS Thomas Jefferson (S 222).

Unlike in the U.S. Navy system, once an older NOAA ship leaves service, a newer one can be given the same hull number; for example, "S 222" was assigned to NOAAS Mount Mitchell (S 222), then assigned to NOAAS Thomas Jefferson (S 222), which entered NOAA service after Mount Mitchell was stricken.

== United States Navy hull classification codes ==
The U.S. Navy's system of alpha-numeric ship designators, and its associated hull numbers, have been for several decades a unique method of categorizing ships of all types: combatants, auxiliaries and district craft. Although considerably changed in detail and expanded over the years, this system remains essentially the same as when formally implemented in 1920. It is a very useful tool for organizing and keeping track of naval vessels, and also provides the basis for the identification numbers painted on the bows (and frequently the sterns) of most U.S. Navy ships.

The ship designator and hull number system's roots extend back to the late 1880s when ship type serial numbers were assigned to most of the new-construction warships of the emerging "Steel Navy". During the course of the next thirty years, these same numbers were combined with filing codes used by the Navy's clerks to create an informal version of the system that was put in place in 1920. Limited usage of ship numbers goes back even earlier, most notably to the "Jeffersonian Gunboats" of the early 1800s and the "Tinclad" river gunboats of the Civil War Mississippi Squadron.

It is important to understand that hull number-letter prefixes are not acronyms, and should not be carelessly treated as abbreviations of ship type classifications. Thus, "DD" does not stand for anything more than "Destroyer". "SS" simply means "Submarine". And "FF" is the post-1975 type code for "Frigate."

The hull classification codes for ships in active duty in the United States Navy are governed under Secretary of the Navy Instruction 5030.8D.

=== Warships ===
Warships are designed to participate in combat operations.

The origin of the two-letter code derives from the need to distinguish various cruiser subtypes.

Battleship	Heavy gun-armed vessel (–1962)	BB
Cruiser	armored (1921–1931) heavy (1931–1975)	CA
Cruiser	large (–1947)	CB
Cruiser	battle command (–1961)	CC
Cruiser	light (–1950)	CL
Cruiser	aviation or voler	CV
Destroyer	ship	DD
Destroyer	escort	DE

==== Aircraft carrier type ====
Aircraft carriers are ships designed primarily for the purpose of conducting combat operations by aircraft which engage in attacks against airborne, surface, sub-surface and shore targets. Contrary to popular belief, the "CV" hull classification symbol does not stand for "carrier vessel". "CV" derives from the cruiser designation, with one popular theory that the V comes from French voler, "to fly", but this has never been definitively proven. The V has long been used by the U.S. Navy for heavier-than-air craft and possibly comes from the French volplane. Aircraft carriers are designated in two sequences: the first sequence runs from CV-1 USS Langley to the very latest ships, and the second sequence, "CVE" for escort carriers, ran from CVE-1 Long Island to CVE-127 Okinawa before being discontinued.

- AV: Heavier-than-air aircraft tender, later Seaplane tender (retired)
- AVD: Seaplane tender destroyer (retired)
- AVP: Seaplane tender, Small (retired)
- AZ: Lighter-than-air aircraft tender (retired) (1920–1923) (Note: See USS Wright (AZ-1).)
- AVG: General-purpose aircraft tender (repurposed escort carrier) (1941–42)
- AVT (i) Auxiliary aircraft transport (retired)
- AVT (ii) Auxiliary training carrier (retired)
- ACV: Auxiliary aircraft carrier (escort carrier, replaced by CVE) (1942)
- CV: Fleet aircraft carrier (1921–1975), multi-purpose aircraft carrier (1975–present)
- CVA: Aircraft carrier, attack (category merged into CV, 30 June 1975)
- CV(N): Aircraft carrier, night (deck equipped with lighting and pilots trained for nighttime fights) (1944) (retired)
- CVAN: Aircraft carrier, attack, nuclear-powered (category merged into CVN, 30 June 1975)
- CVB: Aircraft carrier, large (original USS Midway class, category merged into CVA, 1952)
- CVE: Aircraft carrier, escort (retired) (1943–retirement of type)
- CVHA: Aircraft carrier, helicopter assault (retired in favor of several LH-series amphibious assault ship hull codes)
- CVHE: Aircraft carrier, helicopter, escort (retired)
- CVL: Light aircraft carrier or aircraft carrier, small (retired)
- CVN: Aircraft carrier, nuclear-powered
- CVS: Antisubmarine aircraft carrier (retired)
- CVT: Aircraft carrier, training (changed to AVT (auxiliary))
- CVU: Aircraft carrier, utility (retired)
- CVG: Aircraft carrier, guided missile (retired)
- CF: Flight deck cruiser (1930s, retired unused)
- CVV: Aircraft carrier, vari-purpose, medium (retired unused)

==== Surface combatant type ====
Surface combatants are ships which are designed primarily to engage enemy forces on the high seas. The primary surface combatants are battleships, cruisers and destroyers. Battleships are very heavily armed and armored; cruisers moderately so; destroyers and smaller warships, less so. Before 1920, ships were called "<type> no. X", with the type fully pronounced. The types were commonly abbreviated in ship lists to "B-X", "C-X", "D-X" et cetera—for example, before 1920, USS Minnesota (BB-22) would have been called "USS Minnesota, Battleship number 22" orally and "USS Minnesota, B-22" in writing. After 1920, the ship's name would have been both written and pronounced "USS Minnesota (BB-22)". In generally decreasing size, the types are:

- ACR: Armored cruiser (pre-1920)
- AFSB: Afloat forward staging base (also AFSB(I) for "interim", changed to MLP (Mobile Landing Platform, then ESD and ESB)
- B: Battleship (pre-1920)
- BB: Battleship
- BBG: Battleship, guided missile or arsenal ship (never used operationally) (Note: See USS Kentucky (BB-66).)
- BM: Monitor (1920–retirement)
- C: Cruiser (pre-1920 protected cruisers and peace cruisers)
- CA: (first series) Cruiser, armored (retired, comprised all surviving pre-1920 armored and protected cruisers)
- CA: (second series) Heavy cruiser, category later renamed gun cruiser (retired)
- CAG: Cruiser, heavy, guided missile (retired)
- CB: Large cruiser (retired) (Note: See Alaska-class cruiser.)
- CBC: Large command cruiser (never used operationally) (Note: See USS Hawaii (CB-3).)
- CC: (first usage) Battlecruiser (never used operationally) (Note: See Lexington-class battlecruiser.)
- CC: (second usage) Command cruiser (retired)
- CLC: Command cruiser, light (retired) (Note: See USS Northampton (CLC-1).)
- CG: Cruiser, guided missile
- CGN: Cruiser, guided missile, nuclear-powered: USS Long Beach (CGN-9) and USS Bainbridge (CGN-25)
- CL: Cruiser, light (retired)
- CLAA: Cruiser, light, anti-aircraft (retired)
- CLD: Cruiser-destroyer, light (never used operationally)
- CLG: Cruiser, light, guided missile (retired)
- CLGN: Cruiser, light, guided missile, nuclear-powered (never used operationally)
- CLK: Cruiser, hunter–killer (never used operationally) (Note: see USS Norfolk (DL-1).)
- CM: Cruiser–minelayer (retired)
- CS: Scout cruiser (retired)
- CSGN: Cruiser, strike, guided missile, nuclear-powered (never used operationally)
- D: Destroyer (pre-1920)
- DD: Destroyer
- DDC: Corvette (briefly proposed in the mid-1950s)
- DDE: Escort destroyer, a destroyer (DD) converted for antisubmarine warfare – category abolished 1962. (not to be confused with destroyer escort DE)
- DDG: Destroyer, guided missile
- DDK: Hunter–killer destroyer (category merged into DDE, 4 March 1950)
- DDR: Destroyer, radar picket (retired)
- DE: Destroyer escort (World War II, later became Ocean escort)
- DE: Ocean escort (abolished 30 June 1975)
- DEG: Guided missile ocean escort (abolished 30 June 1975)
- DER: Destroyer escort, radar picket (abolished 30 June 1975) There were two distinct breeds of DER, the DEs which were converted to DERs during World War II and the more numerous postwar DER conversions.
- DL: Destroyer leader (later frigate) (retired)
- DLG: Destroyer leader, guided missile (later frigate) (abolished 30 June 1975)
- DLGN: Destroyer leader, guided missile, nuclear-propulsion (later frigate) (abolished 30 June 1975) The DL category was established in 1951 with the abolition of the CLK category. CLK 1 became DL 1 and DD 927–930 became DL 2–5. By the mid-1950s the term destroyer leader had been dropped in favor of frigate. Most DLGs and DLGNs were reclassified as CGs and CGNs, 30 June 1975. However, DLG 6–15 became DDG 37–46. The old DLs were already gone by that time. Only applied to USS Bainbridge (DLGN-25).
- DM: Destroyer, minelayer (retired)
- DMS: Destroyer, minesweeper (retired)
- FF: Frigate
- PF: Patrol frigate (retired)
- FFG: Frigate, guided missile
- FFH: Frigate with assigned helicopter
- FFL: Frigate, light
- FFR: Frigate, radar picket (retired)
- FFT: Frigate (reserve training) (retired) The FF, FFG, and FFR designations were established 30 June 1975 as new type symbols for ex-DEs, DEGs, and DERs. The first new-built ships to carry the FF/FFG designation were the Oliver Hazard Perry-class frigates.
- PG: Patrol gunboat (retired)
- PCH: Patrol craft, hydrofoil (retired)
- PHM: Patrol, hydrofoil, missile (retired)
- K: Corvette (retired)
- LCS: Littoral combat ship In January 2015, the Navy announced that the up-gunned LCS will be reclassified as a frigate, since the requirements of the SSC Task Force was to upgrade the ships with frigate-like capabilities. The Navy is hoping to start retrofitting technological upgrades onto existing and under construction LCSs before 2019.
- LSES: Large Surface Effect Ship
- M: Monitor (1880s–1920)
- SES: Surface Effect Ship
- TB: Torpedo boat

==== Submarine type ====
Submarines are all self-propelled submersible types (usually started with SS) regardless of whether employed as combatant, auxiliary, or research and development vehicles which have at least a residual combat capability. While some classes, including all diesel-electric submarines, are retired from USN service, non-U.S. navies continue to employ SS, SSA, SSAN, SSB, SSC, SSG, SSM, and SST types. With the advent of new Air Independent Propulsion/Power (AIP) systems, both SSI and SSP are used to distinguish the types within the USN, but SSP has been declared the preferred term. SSK, retired by the USN, continues to be used colloquially and interchangeably with SS for diesel-electric attack/patrol submarines within the USN, and, more formally, by the Royal Navy and British firms such as Jane's Information Group.

- SC: Cruiser Submarine (retired)
- SF: Fleet Submarine (retired)
- SM: Submarine Minelayer (retired)
- SS: Submarine, Attack Submarine
- SSA: Submarine Auxiliary, Auxiliary/Cargo Submarine
- SSAN: Submarine Auxiliary Nuclear, Auxiliary/Cargo Submarine, Nuclear-powered
- SSB: Submarine Ballistic, Ballistic Missile Submarine
- SSBN: Submarine Ballistic Nuclear, Ballistic Missile Submarine, Nuclear-powered
- SSC: Coastal Submarine, over 150 tons
- SSG: Guided Missile Submarine
- SSGN: Guided Missile Submarine, Nuclear-powered (Note: See USS Halibut (SSGN-587).)
- SSI: Attack Submarine (Diesel Air-Independent Propulsion)
- SSK: Hunter-Killer/ASW Submarine (retired)
- SSKN: Hunter-Killer/ASW Submarine, Nuclear-powered (retired)
- SSM: Midget Submarine, under 150 tons
- SSN: Attack Submarine, Nuclear-powered
- SSNR: Special Attack Submarine (Note: This odd entry is not recognized by the U.S. Naval Vessel Register, and appears only in MIL-STD-2525A: Common Warfighting Symbology (15 December 1996) and later editions (MIL-STD-2525B: Common Warfighting Symbology (30 January 1999) and MIL-STD-2525C: Common Warfighting Symbology (17 November 2008)). It seems to refer to some kind of nuclear-powered submarine used by Special Operations Forces.)
- SSO: Submarine Oiler (retired) (Note: See USS Guavina (SSO-362).)
- SSP: Attack Submarine (Diesel Air-Independent Power) (alternate use), formerly Submarine Transport
- SSQ: Auxiliary Submarine, Communications (retired)
- SSQN: Auxiliary Submarine, Communications, Nuclear-powered (retired)
- SSR: Radar Picket Submarine (retired)
- SSRN: Radar Picket Submarine, Nuclear-powered (retired) (Note: See USS Triton (SSRN-586).)
- SST: Training Submarine
- SSV: Submarine Aircraft Carrier (never used)

- AGSS: Auxiliary Submarine
- AOSS: Submarine Oiler (retired)
- ASSP: Transport Submarine (retired)
- APSS: Transport Submarine (retired)
- LPSS: Amphibious Transport Submarine (retired)
- SSLP: Transport Submarine (retired)
SSP, ASSP, APSS, and LPSS were all the same type, redesignated over the years.

- X: Midget submarine (Note: See X-1 submarine.)
- IXSS: Unclassified Miscellaneous Submarine
- MTS: Moored Training Ship (Naval Nuclear Power School Training Platform; reconditioned SSBNs and SSNs)

==== Patrol combatant type ====
Patrol combatants are ships whose mission may extend beyond coastal duties and whose characteristics include adequate endurance and seakeeping, providing a capability for operations exceeding 48 hours on the high seas without support. This notably included Brown Water Navy/Riverine Forces during the Vietnam War. Few of these ships are in service today.

- PBR: Patrol Boat, River, Brown Water Navy (Pibber or PBR-Vietnam)
- PC: Coastal Patrol, originally Sub Chaser
- PCF: Patrol Craft, Fast; Swift Boat, Brown Water Navy (Vietnam)
- PE: Eagle Boat of World War I
- PF: World War II Frigate, based on British River class.
  - PFG: Original designation of USS Oliver Hazard Perry (FFG-7)
- PG: WWII-era Gunboats, later Patrol combatant, with ability to operate in rivers; what is generally known as River gunboats
- PGH: Patrol Combatant, Hydrofoil (USS High Point)
- PHM: Patrol, Hydrofoil Missile (Pegasus-class hydrofoil)
- PR: Patrol, River, such as the USS Panay (PR-5)
- PT: Patrol Torpedo Boat, the U.S. take on the Motor Torpedo Boat (World War II)
- PTF:Patrol Torpedo Fast, Brown Water Navy (Vietnam)
- PTG/PTGB: Patrol Torpedo Gunboat
- Monitor: Heavily gunned riverine boat, Brown Water Navy (Vietnam and prior). Named for USS Monitor
- ASPB: Assault Support Patrol Boat, "Alpha Boat", Brown Water Navy; also used as riverine minesweeper (Vietnam)
- PACV: Patrol Air Cushion Vehicle, hovercraft that was part of the Brown Water Navy (Vietnam)
- SP: Section Patrol, used indiscriminately for patrol vessels, mine warfare vessels, and some other types (World War I; retired 1920)

==== Amphibious warfare type ====
Amphibious warfare vessels include all ships having an organic capability for amphibious warfare and which have characteristics enabling long duration operations on the high seas. There are two classifications of craft: amphibious warfare ships, which are built to cross oceans, and landing craft, which are designed to take troops from ship to shore in an invasion.

The U.S. Navy hull classification symbol for a ship with a well deck depends on its facilities for aircraft:

- An LSD has a helicopter deck, which was removable in the older ships.
- An LPD has a hangar in addition to the helicopter deck.
- An LHD or LHA has a full-length flight deck.

Ships

- AKA: Attack Cargo Ship (To LKA, 1969)
- APA: Attack Transport (To LPA, 1969)
- APD: High speed transport (Converted Destroyer or Destroyer Escort) (To LPR, 1969)
- APM: Mechanized Artillery Transports (To LSD)
- AGC: Amphibious Force Flagship (To LCC, 1969)
- LCC: (second usage) Amphibious Command Ship
- LHA: General-Purpose Amphibious Assault Ship, also known as Landing ship, Helicopter, Assault
- LHD: Multi-Purpose Amphibious Assault Ship, also known as Landing ship, Helicopter, Dock
- LKA: Amphibious Cargo Ship (out of commission)
- LPA: Amphibious Transport
- LPD: Amphibious transport dock, also known as Landing ship, Personnel, Dock
- LPH: Landing ship, Personnel, Helicopter
- LPR: High speed transport
- LSD: Landing Ship, Dock
- LSH: Landing Ship, Heavy
- LSIL: Landing Ship, Infantry (Large) (formerly LCIL)
- LSL: Landing Ship, Logistics
- LSM: Landing Ship, Medium
  - LSM(R): Landing Ship, Medium (Rocket)
- LSSL: Landing Ship, Support (Large) (formerly LCSL)
- LST: Landing Ship, Tank
  - LST(H): Landing Ship, Tank (Hospital)
- LSV: Landing Ship, Vehicle

Landing Craft

- LCA: Landing Craft, Assault
- LCAC: Landing Craft Air Cushion
- LCC: (first usage) Landing Craft, Control
- LCFF: (Flotilla Flagship)
- LCH: Landing Craft, Heavy
- LCI: Landing Craft, Infantry, World War II-era classification further modified by
  - (G) – Gunboat
  - (L) – Large
  - (M) – Mortar
  - (R) – Rocket
- LCL: Landing Craft, Logistics (UK)
- LCM: Landing Craft, Mechanized
- LCP: Landing Craft, Personnel
- LCP(L): Landing Craft, Personnel, Large
- LCP(R): Landing Craft, Personnel, Ramped
- LCPA: Landing Craft, Personnel, Air-Cushioned
- LCS(L): Landing Craft, Support (Large) changed to LSSL in 1949
- LCT: Landing Craft, Tank (World War II era)
- LCU: Landing Craft, Utility
- LCVP: Landing Craft, Vehicle and Personnel
- LSH: Landing Ship Heavy (Royal Australian Navy)

==== Expeditionary support ====
Operated by Military Sealift Command, have ship prefix "USNS", hull code begins with "T-".

- EMS: Expeditionary Medical Ship, an EPF modified into a hospital ship
- EPF: Expeditionary fast transport
- ESB: Expeditionary Mobile Base (a variant of ESD, formerly Afloat Forward Staging Base (AFSB))
- ESD: Expeditionary Transfer Dock
- HST: High-Speed Transport (similar to JHSV, not to be confused with WWII-era High-speed transport (APD))
- HSV: High-Speed Vessel
- JHSV: Joint High-Speed Vessel (changed to EPF)
- MLP: Mobile Landing Platform (changed to ESD)

==== Mine warfare type ====
Mine warfare ships are those ships whose primary function is mine warfare on the high seas.

- ADG: Degaussing ship
- AM: Minesweeper
- AMb: Harbor minesweeper
- AMc: Coastal minesweeper
- AMCU: Underwater mine locater
- AMS: Motor minesweeper
- CM: Cruiser (i.e., large) minelayer
- CMc: Coastal minelayer
- DM: High-speed minelayer (converted destroyer)
- DMS: High-speed minesweeper (converted-destroyer)
- PCS: Submarine chasers (wooden) fitted for minesweeping
- YDG: District degaussing vessel

In 1955 all mine warfare vessels except for degaussing vessels had their hull codes changed to begin with "M".

- MCM: Mine countermeasures ship
- MCS: Mine countermeasures support ship
- MH(C)(I)(O)(S): Minehunter, (coastal) (inshore) (ocean) (hunter and sweeper, general)
- MLC: Coastal minelayer
- MSC: Minesweeper, coastal
- MSF: Minesweeper, steel hulled
- MSO: Minesweeper, ocean

==== Coastal defense type ====
Coastal defense ships are those whose primary function is coastal patrol and interdiction.

- FS: Corvette
- PB: Patrol boat
- PBR: Patrol boat, river
- PC: Patrol, coastal
- PCE: Patrol craft, escort
- PCF: Patrol craft, fast, (swift boat)
- PCS: Patrol craft, sweeper (modified-motor minesweepers meant for anti-submarine warfare)
- PF: Frigate, in a role similar to World War II Commonwealth corvette
- PG: Patrol gunboat
- PGM: Motor gunboat (To PG, 1967)
- PR: Patrol, river
- SP: Section patrol

=== Auxiliaries ===
An auxiliary ship is designed to operate in any number of roles supporting combatant ships and other naval operations.

==== Combat logistics type ====
Ships which have the capability to provide underway replenishment (UNREP) to fleet units.

- AE: Ammunition ship
- AF: Reefer ship / Stores ship (retired)
- AFS: Combat stores ship
- AK: Dry cargo ship
- AKE: Advanced dry cargo ship
- AKS: General stores ship
- AO: Fleet Oiler
- AOE: Fast combat support ship
- AOL: Light replenishment oiler (Note: In 2020 the US Navy began to develop this new type of ship, construction of the first is planned for 2026)
- AOR: Replenishment oiler
- AVS: Aviation Stores Issue Ship (retired)

==== Mobile logistics type ====
Mobile logistics ships have the capability to provide direct material support to other deployed units operating far from home ports.

- AC: Collier (retired)
- AD: Destroyer tender
- AGP: Patrol craft tender
- AR: Repair ship
- ARB: Repair ship, battle damage
- ARC: Repair ship, cable
- ARG: Repair ship, internal combustion engine
- ARH: Repair ship, heavy-hull (Note: See USS Jason (ARH-1).)
- ARL: Repair ship, landing craft
- ARV: Repair ship, aircraft
- ARVH: Repair ship, aircraft, helicopter
- AS: Submarine tender
- AW: Distilling ship (retired)

==== Support ships ====
Support ships are not designed to participate in combat and are generally not armed. For ships with civilian crews (owned by and/or operated for Military Sealift Command and the Maritime Administration), the prefix T- is placed at the front of the hull classification.

Support ships are designed to operate in the open ocean in a variety of sea states to provide general support to either combatant forces or shore-based establishments. They include smaller auxiliaries which, by the nature of their duties, leave inshore waters.

- AB: Auxiliary Crane Ship (1920–41) (Note: See USS Crane Ship No. 1)
- ACS: Auxiliary Crane Ship
- AG: Miscellaneous Auxiliary
- AGB: Icebreaker
- AGDE: Testing Ocean Escort (Note: See USS Glover (AGDE-1))
- AGDS: Deep Submergence Support Ship
- AGEH: Hydrofoil, experimental (Note: See USS Plainview (AGEH-1))
- AGER: (i): Miscellaneous Auxiliary, Electronic Reconnaissance
- AGER: (ii): Environmental Research Ship
- AGF: Miscellaneous Command Ship
- AGFF: Testing Frigate (Note: See USS Glover (AGFF-1))
- AGHS: Patrol combatant support ship—ocean or inshore
- AGL: Auxiliary vessel, lighthouse tender
- AGM: Missile Range Instrumentation Ship
- AGMR: Major Communications Relay Ship
- AGOR: Oceanographic Research Ship
- AGOS: Ocean Surveillance Ship
- AGR: Radar picket ship
- AGS: Surveying Ship
- AGSC: Coastal Survey Ships
- AGSE: Submarine and Special Warfare Support
- AGTR: Technical research ship
- AH: Hospital ship
- AKD: Cargo Ship, Dock (Note: See USS Point Barrow (AKD-1))
- AKL: Cargo Ship, Small
- AKN: Cargo Ship, Net
- AKR: Cargo Ship, Vehicle
- AKV: Cargo Ship, Aircraft
- AN: Net laying ship
- AOG: Gasoline tanker
- AOT: Transport Oiler
- AP: Transport
- APB: Self-propelled Barracks Ship
- APC: Coastal Transport
- APc: Coastal Transport, Small
- APH: Evacuation Transport
- APL: Barracks Craft
- ARS: Rescue and Salvage Ship
- ARSD: Salvage Lifting Vessels
- ASR: Submarine Rescue Ship
- AT: Fleet Tug
- ATA: Auxiliary Ocean Tug
- ATF: Fleet Ocean Tug
- ATLS: Drone Launch Ship
- ATO: Fleet Tug, Old
- ATR: Rescue Tug
- ATS: Salvage and Rescue Ship
- AVB(i): Aviation Logistics Support Ship
- AVB(ii): Advance Aviation Base Ship
- AVM: Guided Missile Ship (Note: See USS Norton Sound (AVM-1))
- AVT(i): Auxiliary Aircraft Transport
- AVT(ii): Auxiliary Aircraft Landing Training Ship
- EPCER: Experimental – Patrol Craft Escort – Rescue
- PCER: Patrol Craft Escort – Rescue
- SBX: Sea-based X-band Radar – a mobile active electronically scanned array early-warning radar station.

==== Service type craft ====
Service craft are navy-subordinated craft (including non-self-propelled) designed to provide general support to either combatant forces or shore-based establishments. The suffix "N" refers to non-self-propelled variants.

- AFDB: Large Auxiliary Floating Dry Dock
- AFD/AFDL: Small Auxiliary Floating Dry Dock
- AFDM: Medium Auxiliary Floating Dry Dock
- ARD: Auxiliary Repair Dry Dock
- ARDM: Medium Auxiliary Repair Dry Dock USS Oak Ridge (ARDM-1)
- JUB/JB: Jack Up Barge

==== Submersibles ====
- DSRV: Deep Submergence Rescue Vehicle
- DSV: Deep Submergence Vehicle
- NR: Submersible Research Vehicle (Note: See Deep Submergence Vessel NR-1.)

=== Yard and district craft ===
- YAG: Miscellaneous Auxiliary Service
- YC: Open Lighter
- YCF: Car Float
- YCV: Aircraft Transportation Lighter
- YD: Floating Crane
- YDT: Diving Tender
- YF: Covered Lighter
- YFB: Ferry Boat or Launch
- YFD: Yard Floating Dry Dock
- YFN: Covered Lighter (non-self propelled)
- YFNB: Large Covered Lighter (non-self propelled)
- YFND: Dry Dock Companion Craft (non-self propelled)
- YFNX: Lighter (Special purpose) (non-self propelled)
- YFP: Floating Power Barge
- YFR: Refrigerated Cover Lighter
- YFRN: Refrigerated Covered Lighter (non-self propelled)
- YFRT: Range Tender USNS Range Recoverer (T-AG-161)
- YFU: Harbor Utility Craft
- YG: Garbage Lighter
- YGN: Garbage Lighter (non-self propelled)
- YH: Ambulance boat/small medical support vessel
- YLC: Salvage Lift Craft
- YM: Dredge
- YMN: Dredge (non-self propelled)
- YNG: Net Gate Craft
- YN: Yard Net Tender
- YNT: Net Tender
- YO: Fuel Oil Barge
- YOG: Gasoline Barge
- YOGN: Gasoline Barge (non-self propelled)
- YON: Fuel Oil Barge (non-self propelled)
- YOS: Oil Storage Barge
- YP: Patrol Craft, Training
- YPD: Floating Pile Driver
- YR: Floating Workshop
- YRB: Repair and Berthing Barge
- YRBM: Repair, Berthing and Messing Barge
- YRDH: Floating Dry Dock Workshop (Hull)
- YRDM: Floating Dry Dock Workshop (Machine)
- YRR: Radiological Repair Barge nuclear ships and submarines service
- YRST: Salvage Craft Tender
- YSD: Seaplane Wrecking Derrick – Yard Seaplane Derrick
- YSR: Sludge Removal Barge
- YT: Harbor Tug (craft later assigned YTB, YTL, or YTM classifications)
- YTB: Large Harbor tug
- YTL: Small Harbor Tug
- YTM: Medium Harbor Tug
- YTT: Torpedo trials craft
- YW: Water Barge
- YWN: Water Barge (non-self propelled)

=== Miscellaneous ships and craft ===
- ID or Id. No.: Civilian ship taken into service for auxiliary duties, used indiscriminately for large ocean-going ships of all kinds and coastal and yard craft (World War I; retired 1920)
- IX: Unclassified Miscellaneous Unit
- "none": To honor her unique historical status, USS Constitution, formerly IX 21, was reclassified to "none", effective 1 September 1975.

=== Airships ===
Although aircraft, pre-World War II rigid airships were commissioned (no different from surface warships and submarines), flew the U.S. ensign from their stern and carried a United States Ship (USS) designation.

Rigid airships:

- ZR: Rigid airship
- ZRS: Rigid airship scout (Note: See Akron-class airship.)
- ZRCV: Rigid airship aircraft carrier, proposed, not built

Lighter-than-air aircraft (e.g., blimps) continued to fly the U.S. ensign from their stern but were registered as aircraft:

=== Temporary designations ===
United States Navy Designations (Temporary) are a form of U.S. Navy ship designation, intended for temporary identification use. Such designations usually occur during periods of sudden mobilization, such as that which occurred prior to, and during, World War II or the Korean War, when it was determined that a sudden temporary need arose for a ship for which there was no official Navy designation.

During World War II, for example, a number of commercial vessels were requisitioned, or acquired, by the U.S. Navy to meet the sudden requirements of war. A yacht acquired by the U.S. Navy during the start of World War II might seem desirable to the Navy whose use for the vessel might not be fully developed or explored at the time of acquisition.

On the other hand, a U.S. Navy vessel, such as the yacht in the example above, already in commission or service, might be desired, or found useful, for another need or purpose for which there is no official designation.

- IX: Unclassified Miscellaneous Auxiliary Ship, for example, yacht Chanco acquired by the U.S. Navy on 1 October 1940. It was classified as a minesweeper AMc-5, but instead, mainly used as a patrol craft along the New England coast. When another assignment came, and it could not be determined how to classify the vessel, it was redesignated IX-175 on 10 July 1944.
- IXSS: Unclassified Miscellaneous Submarines, such as the USS Cod (IXSS-224), the USS Angler (IXSS-240) and the USS Croaker (IXSS-246).
- YAG: Miscellaneous Auxiliary Service Craft, such as the USS George Eastman (YAG-39), USS Butternut (YAG-60) and USS Christiana (YAG-32) which, curiously, was earlier known as IX-80.

Numerous other U.S. Navy vessels were launched with a temporary, or nominal, designation, such as YMS or PC, since it could not be determined, at the time of construction, what they should be used for. Many of these were vessels in the 150 to 200 feet length class with powerful engines, whose function could be that of a minesweeper, patrol craft, submarine chaser, seaplane tender, tugboat, or other. Once their destiny, or capability, was found or determined, such vessels were reclassified with their actual designation.

== United States Coast Guard vessels ==
Prior to 1965, U.S. Coast Guard cutters used the same designation as naval ships but preceded by a "W" to indicate Coast Guard commission. The U.S. Coast Guard considers any ship over 65 feet in length with a permanently assigned crew, a cutter.

=== Current USCG cutter classes and types ===
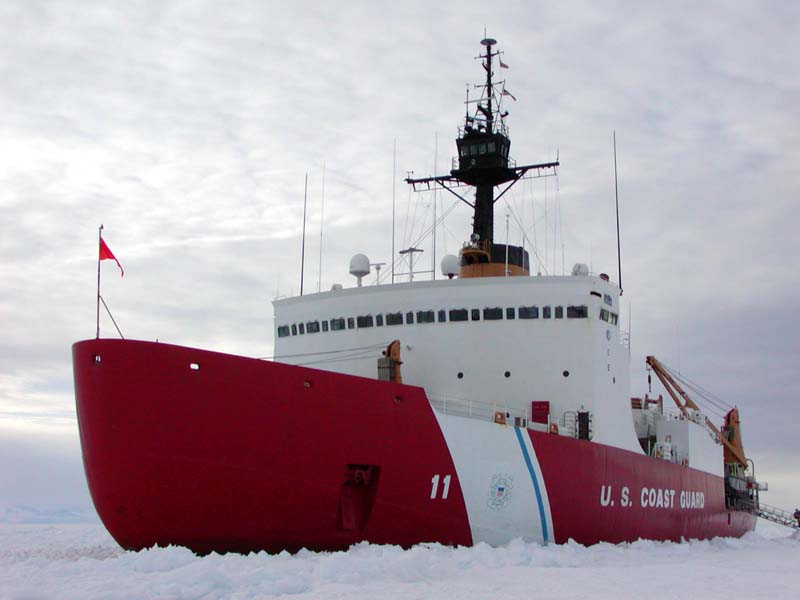
USCG icebreaker Polar Sea

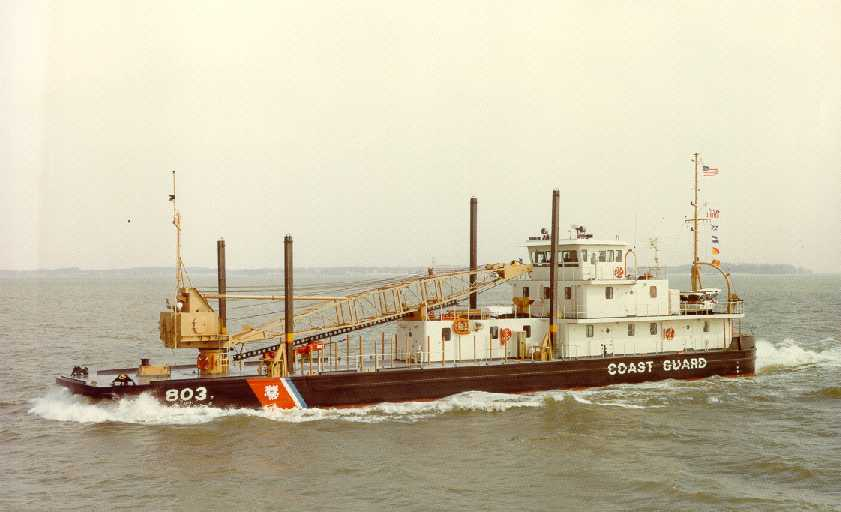
USCG Inland Construction Tender Saginaw

- 420' Icebreaker Healy (WAGB)
- 418' National Security Cutter (WMSL)
- 399' Polar-class icebreaker (WAGB)
- 360' Offshore Patrol Cutter (WMSM)
- 295' USCGC Eagle (WIX)
- 282' Edenton-class salvage and rescue ship, converted to Medium Endurance Cutter (WMEC)
- 270' and 210' Medium Endurance Cutter (WMEC)
- 240' USCGC Mackinaw (WLBB)
- 225' Seagoing Buoy Tender (WLB)
- 175' Coastal Buoy Tender (WLM)
- 160' Inland Construction Tender (WLIC)
- 154' Sentinel-class cutter (WPC)
- 140' Bay-class icebreaking tug (WTGB)
- 100' Inland Buoy Tender (WLI)
- 100' Inland Construction Tender (WLIC)
- 87' Marine Protector-class coastal patrol boat (WPB)
- 75' River Buoy Tender (WLR)
- 75' Inland Construction Tender (WLIC)
- 65' River Buoy Tender (WLR)
- 65' Inland Buoy Tender (WLI)
- 65' Small Harbor Tug (WYTL)

=== Historic USCG cutter classes and types ===
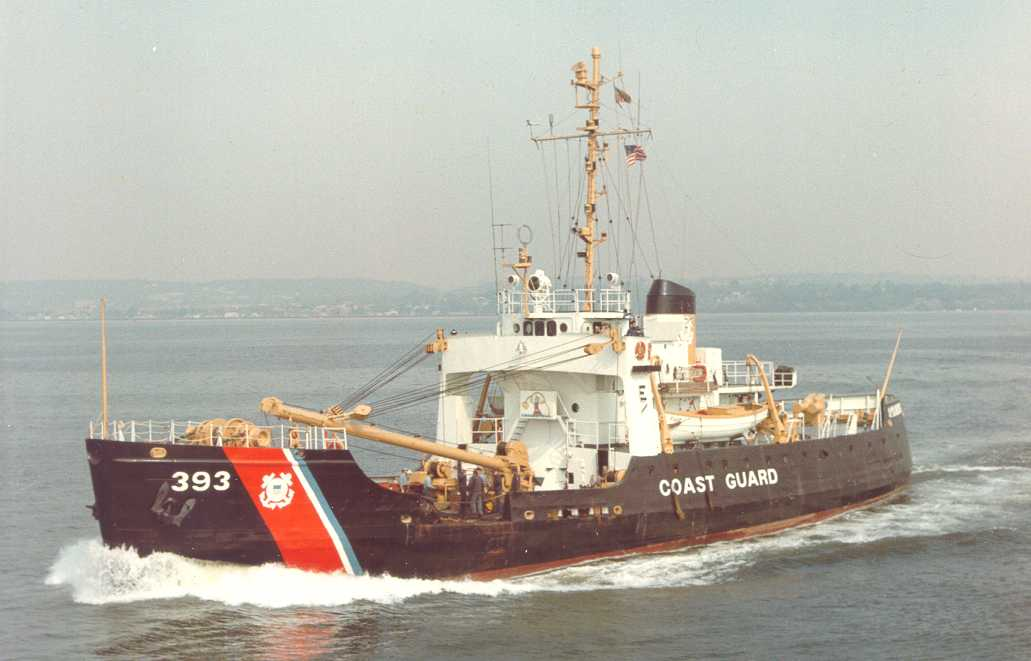
USCG Iris-class buoy tender Firebush

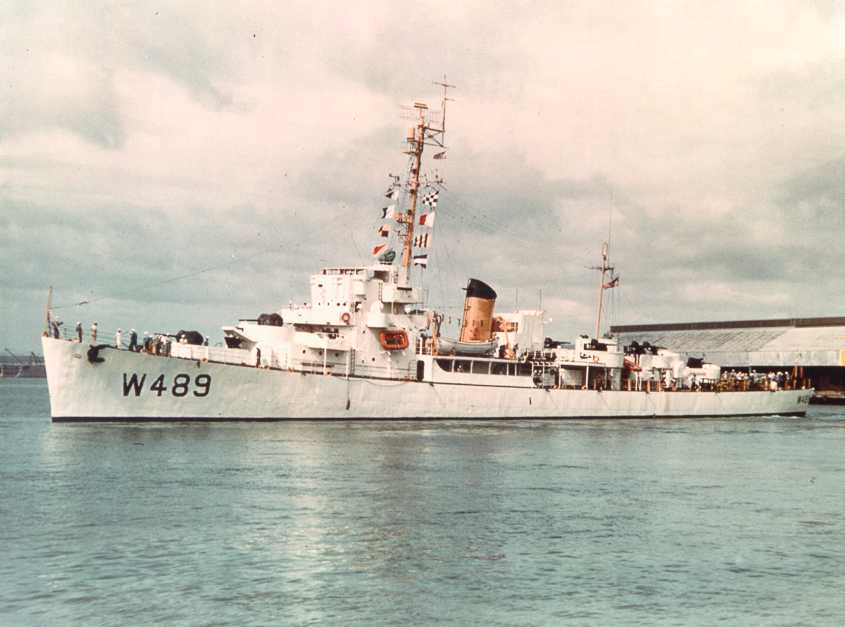
USCG Edsall-class cutter Durant

- 378' High endurance cutter (WHEC)
- 327' Treasury-class cutter (WPG)
- 311' Casco-class cutter (WAVP)
- 306' Edsall-class cutter (WDE)
- 269' Wind-class icebreaker (WAGB)
- 255' Owasco-class cutter
- 250' Lake-class cutter
- 240' Tampa-class cutter
- 230' Light Icebreaker, redesignated Medium Endurance Cutter (WMEC)
- 213' Diver-class rescue and salvage ship
- 213' Medium Endurance Cutter (WMEC)
- 205' Cherokee-class fleet tug, converted to (WAT) cutter, redesignated (WMEC)
- 180' Seagoing buoy tender (WLB)
- 180' Oceanographic vessel (WAGO)
- 165' Thetis-class patrol boat
- 165' Algonquin-class patrol boat
- 165' Tallapoosa-class boat
- 157' Red-class coastal buoy tender (WLM)
- 133' White-class coastal buoy tender (WLM)
- 125' Active-class patrol boat (WSC)
- 123' Patrol boat (Deepwater Modified) (WPB)
- 110' Island-class patrol boat (WPB)
- 110' Calumet-class harbor tug (WYTM)
- 110' Apalachee-class harbor tug (WYTM)
- 110' Manitou-class harbor tug (WYTM)
- 95' Cape-class cutter (WPB)
- 82' Point-class cutter (WPB)

=== USCG classification symbols definitions ===
- CG: all Coast Guard ships in the 1920s (retired)
- WAGB: Coast Guard Polar-class icebreaker
- WAGL: Auxiliary vessel, lighthouse tender (retired 1960's)
- WAL: Coast Guard anchored lightvessel—later merged under WLV
- WAVP: seagoing Coast Guard seaplane tenders (retired 1960s)
- WDE: seagoing Coast Guard destroyer escorts (retired 1960s)
- WHEC: Coast Guard high endurance cutters
- WIX: Coast Guard barque Eagle
- WLB: Coast Guard buoy tenders
- WLBB: Coast Guard seagoing buoy tenders/ice breaker
- WLI: Coast Guard inland buoy tenders
- WLIC: Coast Guard inland construction tenders
- WLM: Coast Guard coastal buoy tenders
- WLR: Coast Guard river buoy tenders
- WLV: Coast Guard lightvessel
- WMEC: Coast Guard medium endurance cutters
- WMSA: Coast Guard Arctic Security Cutter
- WMSL: Coast Guard maritime security cutter, large (referred to as national security cutters)
- WMSM: Coast Guard maritime security cutter, medium (referred to as offshore patrol cutters)
- WMSP: Coast Guard polar security cutter
- WPB: Coast Guard patrol boats
- WPC: Coast Guard patrol craft—later reclassed under WHEC, symbol reused for Coast Guard patrol cutter (referred to as fast response cutters)
- WPG: seagoing Coast Guard gunboats (retired 1960s)
- WTGB: Coast Guard tug boat (140' icebreakers)
- WYTL: Coast Guard small harbor tug

=== USCG classification symbols for small craft and boats ===
- MLB: Motor Life Boat (52', 47', and 44' variants)
- UTB: Utility Boat
- DPB: Deployable Pursuit Boat
- ANB: Aids to Navigation Boats
- TPSB: Transportable Port Security Boat
- RHIB: Rigid Hull Inflatable Boats
- SRB: Surf Rescue Boat (30')

== National Oceanic and Atmospheric Administration hull codes ==
- R: Research ships, including oceanographic and fisheries research ships
- S: Survey ships, including hydrographic survey ships

The letter is paired with a three-digit number. The first digit of the number is determined by the ship's "power tonnage," defined as the sum of its shaft horsepower and gross tonnage, as follows:

- If the power tonnage is 5,501 through 9,000, the first digit is "1".
- If the power tonnage is 3,501 through 5,500, the first digit is "2."
- If the power tonnage is 2,001 through 3,500, the first digit is "3."
- If the power tonnage is 1,001 through 2,000, the first digit is "4."
- If the power tonnage is 501 through 1,000, the first digit is "5."
- If the power tonnage is 500 or less and the ship is at least 65 feet (20 meters) long, the first digit is "6."

The second and third digits are assigned to create a unique three-digit hull number.

== See also ==
- United States Navy 1975 ship reclassification
- List of hull classifications – same as this article but in alphabetical order
- List of ships of the United States Army
- Ship prefix
- Hull classification symbol (Canada)
- Pennant number for the British Commonwealth equivalent

== General and cited references ==
- Derdall, Guy; DiGiulian, Tony (12 November 2016). "USN Ship Designations". navweaps.com.
- United States Naval Aviation 1910–1995, Appendix 16: U.S. Navy and Marine Corps Squadron Designations and Abbreviations. U.S. Navy, c. 1995. Quoted in Derdall and DiGiulian, op cit.
- "ACP 113 (AF) Call Sign Book for Ships" (PDF). NATO. September 2004. Archived from the original (PDF) on 27 February 2009.
- USCG Designations
- Naval History and Heritage Command Online Library of Selected Images: U.S. Navy Ships – Listed by Hull Number: "SP" #s and "ID" #s — World War I Era Patrol Vessels and other Acquired Ships and Craft
- Wertheim, Eric. The Naval Institute Guide to Combat Fleets of the World, 15th Edition: Their Ships, Aircraft, and Systems. Annapolis, Maryland: Naval Institute Press, 2007. ISBN 978-1-59114-955-2. ISSN 1057-4581.
