= HNLMS Zuiderkruis =

HNLMS Zuiderkruis (Dutch: Hr.Ms. or Zr.Ms. Zuiderkruis) may refer to the following ships of the Royal Netherlands Navy that have been named after the Southern Cross:

- HNLMS Zuiderkruis (1923), a cable layer commissioned into the Gouvernements Marine. Transferred to the Royal Netherlands Navy and converted to supply ship and seaplane tender in 1939.
- HNLMS Zuiderkruis (A853), an accommodation ship that was in service between 1963 and 1968
- HNLMS Zuiderkruis (A832), a replenishment oiler that was in service between 1975 and 2012
