= DPB =

DPB may stand for:

== Government ==
- Domestic Purposes Benefit, in the New Zealand social security system
- Defense Policy Board, of the US Department of Defense

== Science and technology ==
- Decoded Picture Buffer, used by video decoders
- Diffuse panbronchiolitis, a lung disease
- Disinfection by-product, in water treatment

== Transport ==
- Deer Park Bypass, Melbourne, Australia
- Depok Baru railway station, Depok, Indonesia
- USCG deployable pursuit boat
- Dopravný podnik Bratislava, a Slovakian public transport operator

== Other uses ==
- Deutscher Pfadfinderbund (1945)
- Discounted Payback, an engineering economics measure
