= USS Palmyra =

1945 Laysan Island-class salvage craft tender

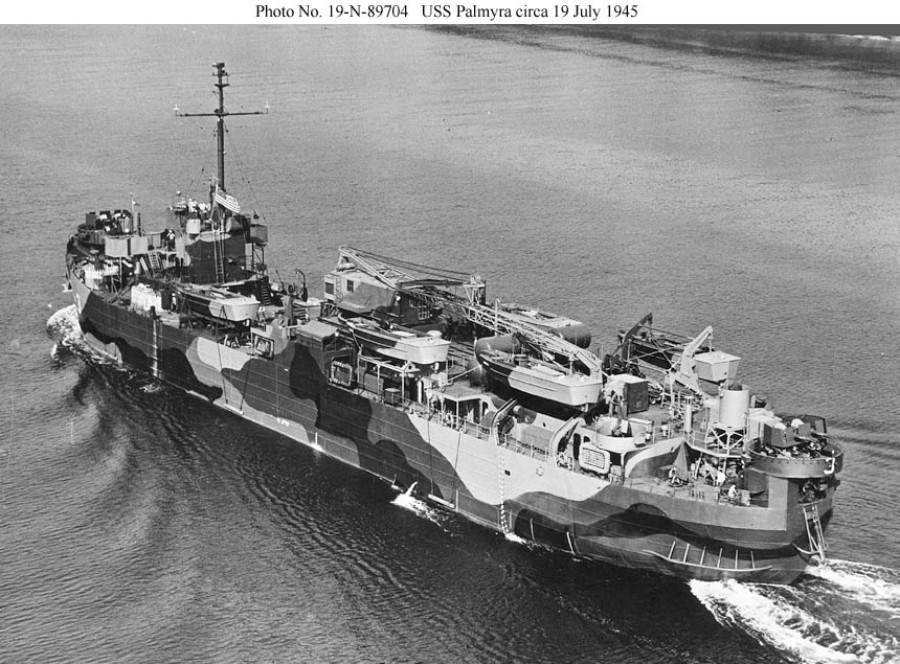

History

United States
- Name: USS Palmyra
- Namesake: Palmyra Atoll
- Builder: Jeffersonville Boat and Machine Co., Jeffersonville, Indiana
- Laid down: 11 December 1944
- Launched: 20 February 1945
- Commissioned: 28 July 1945
- Decommissioned: 20 June 1947
- Renamed: Palmyra, 23 December 1944
- Reclassified: ARST-3, 8 December 1944
- Stricken: 1 June 1973
- Fate: Sold for scrap 1 April 1974

General characteristics
- Type: Laysan Island-class salvage craft tender
- Displacement: 3,800 long tons (3,861 t) full
- Length: 328 ft (100 m)
- Beam: 50 ft (15 m)
- Draft: 14 m (46 ft)
- Propulsion: two General Motors 12-567A Diesel engines single Falk Main Reduction Gears four Diesel-drive 100 kW 120 / 240 V DC twin rudders twin propellers, 1,800 shp
- Speed: 11.6 knots (21.5 km/h; 13.3 mph)
- Complement: 269
- Armament: 2 × quad 40mm AA gun; 12 × single 20mm AA guns

USS Palmyra (ARST-3) was a Laysan Island-class salvage craft tender of the United States Navy.

== Service history ==
She was laid down on 11 December 1944 as LST-1100 at the Jeffersonville Boat and Machine Company in Jeffersonville, Indiana. She was named Palmyra on 23 December 1944 and commissioned on 28 July 1945.

After shakedown in the Gulf of Mexico, Palmyra transited the Panama Canal and joined ServRon 10 of the Service Force in the Pacific Fleet. She served with ServRon 10 at Guam up to February 1946. Palmyra then became part of TU 1.2.7, the salvage unit for Operation Crossroads. She arrived at Bikini Atoll in May 1946 and participated in preparations for the tests. After the nuclear tests were completed. she helped the salvage operations. Palmyra reported to ComLantResFit on 6 February 1947 and was decommissioned on 20 June 1947, joining the Reserve Fleet at Orange, Texas.

After more than twenty years in reserve, Palmyra was struck in 1973 and sold for scrapping by the Defense Reutilization and Marketing Office on 1 April 1974.
