= List of seaplane carriers by country =

The list of seaplane carriers by country includes seaplane carriers and tenders organized by country of origin and service.

== Australia ==
- HMAS Albatross: seaplane tender in service from 1928 to 1933, later HMS Albatross

== Colombia ==
- MC Cucuta: (After 1936 as ARC Cucuta) A floatplane tender equipped with 3 Curtiss Falcon, also used as the first training ship of the Colombian Navy

== France ==
- Foudre: Converted Torpedo boat Tender in service as a seaplane carrier from 1914 to 1918
- Compinas: Converted merchant ship in service as a seaplane tender from 1915 to 1916
- Nord: Converted merchant ship in service as a seaplane tender from 1915 to 1919
- Pas-de-Calais: Converted merchant ship in service as a seaplane tender from 1915 to 1919
- Rouen: Converted merchant ship in service as a seaplane tender from 1916 to 1919
- Petrel-class: Eight light inshore seaplane tenders in service from 1931 into World War II
- Commandant Teste: Seaplane transport and tender in service from 1932 to 1942
- Belfort: Converted Arras-class aviso in service from 1939 to 1946
- Diligente: Converted Friponne-class sloop in service during 1940
- Paul Goffeny: Former German tug type seaplane tender in service from 1948 to 1955
- Robert Giraud: Former German tug type seaplane tender in service from 1948 to 1963
- Marcel le Bihan: Seaplane support ship from 1948 to 1961

== Ethiopia ==
- Training ship Ethiopia

== Germany ==
=== World War I seaplane carriers ===
- Answald (FS 1) auxiliary seaplane carrier
- Santa Elena (FS II) auxiliary seaplane carrier
- Oswald (FS III) auxiliary seaplane carrier
- Glyndwr auxiliary seaplane carrier
- Adeline Hugo Stinnes auxiliary small seaplane carrier
- Stuttgart seaplane cruiser
- Roon planned seaplane cruiser

=== Civil Tender type catapult seaplane tenders ===
- Westfalen
- Schwabenland
- Ostmark
- Friesenland

=== World War II seaplane tenders (Luftwaffe) ===
- Sperber catapult seaplane tender
- Bussard-class catapult seaplane tenders
  - Bussard
  - Falke
- Krischan-class small seaplane tenders
  - Krischan
  - Gunther Pluschow
  - Bernard Von Tschirschy
  - Hans Rolshoven
- Karl Meyer-class small seaplane tenders
  - Karl Meyer
  - Max Stinsky
  - Imelmann
  - Boelcke
- Hans Albrecht Wedel-class small seaplane tenders
  - Hans Albrecht Wedel
  - Richthofen
  - Hermann Kohl
- Greif small seaplane tender
- Ex-French Sans Souci-class small seaplane tenders
  - Jupiter/Merkur (SG1)
  - Saturn/Uranus (SG2)
  - Uranus/Saturn (SG3)
  - Merkur/Jupiter (SG4)

== Italy ==
- Giuseppe Miraglia seaplane carrier (converted from train ferry shortly after launch), 1923–1950
- Europa (1895) (merchantman converted to seaplane carrier) – stricken 1920

== Japan ==
- Large flying boat tenders
  - Akitsushima
  - Kamoi (converted as oiler)
- Seaplane tenders
  - Wakamiya
  - Notoro (converted from oiler)
  - Kamikawa Maru-class (4 ships, converted from merchantmen)
- Seaplane and midget submarine carriers
  - Chitose-class (2 ships; both were converted to aircraft carriers)
  - Mizuho
  - Nisshin
- Seaplane carriers hybrids
  - Tone-class (heavy aviation cruiser, 2 ships)
  - Mogami (heavy aviation cruiser, conversion)
  - Ōyodo (light aviation cruiser)
  - Ise-class (aviation battleship, 2 ships conversions)
  - Hayasui (oiler & seaplane tender)
- Submarine aircraft carriers
  - Junsen Type A Mod.2 (2 ships)
  - Sentoku Type (3 ships)
  - 37 submarines fitted with a single seaplane.

== Netherlands ==
- Merel-class auxiliary small seaplane tenders:
  - HNLMS Merel
  - HNLMS Reiger
  - HNLMS Fazant
- Serdang-class converted MTB- and seaplane tenders:
  - HNLMS Serdang
  - HNLMS Koetei
  - HNLMS Siboga
- Valk-class opium hunters used for escorting duty and as seaplane tenders:
  - HNLMS Valk
  - HNLMS Arend
- HNLMS Zuiderkruis: A converted supply ship used as seaplane tender.

== Portugal ==
- SS Cubango – cargo ship converted in a seaplane tender in 1931

== Spain ==
- Dedalo 9,900 ton ex-German cargo ship Neuenfels 1901, transferred to Spain 1921, converted to seaplane carrier 1922. Scrapped 1 March 1940

== Romania ==
- Regele Carol I – passenger steamer leased to Russia during World War I and converted to seaplane tender and minelayer, sunk during World War II in October 1941

== Russia ==
Russia is one of birthplaces of naval aviation. Catchinskaia school of aviators (near Sevastopol) began to work in 1910 under the patronage of Admiral, Grand Duke Aleksandr Michailowich (Romanov-dynasty). Ships:

- Almaz – Russian for "Diamond". Light (3d rank) cruiser of The Russian Imperial Navy. Veteran of the Tsushima Battle. Transferred from Far East to Black Sea Fleet. Participated in the 1914 Battle of Cape Sarytch (against "Goeben") and First Bombardment of Bosphorus 28 March 1915. In November 1914 converted to hydrocruiser (hydro aircraft carrier). Seaplanes from Almaz provide bombardment the targets on the Turkish and Bulgarian shores. After the October Revolution ship acquired a terrible reputation as a floating prison, where in 1918 revolutionary sailors executed the enemies of the revolution – officers, merchants and other "bourgeois" and "counter-revolutionaries".
- Imperator Nikolai I – Russian for "Emperor Nicholas The First". Hydro-avia-transport of the Black Sea Fleet. Aircraft from cruiser supported Army assaults on Caucasian Front, participated in Trapesund landings 1916.
- Princessa Maria – Russian for "Princess Maria". Hydro-avia-transport of the Black Sea Fleet, converted from a Romanian liner.
- Orlitsa – Russian for "She-Eagle", hydro-avia-transport of the Baltic Fleet. Attached to the Sea Force Riga Gulf. The day 16 of July 1916 when M-9s from "Orlitsa" engaged in a battle with four German sea planes and shot down two, is now celebrated in Russia as the Day of Naval Aviation.
- Imperator Trajan – Russian for "Emperor Trajan", hydro-avia-transport of the Black Sea Fleet, converted from Romanian steamer. Take active service during WWI Black Sea Campaign.
- Dacia – hydro-avia-transport of the Black Sea Fleet. Converted from a Romanian steamer. Take active service during WWI Black Sea Campaign.
- Imperator Alexandr I – Russian "Emperor Alexander The First", hydro-avia-transport of the Black Sea Fleet. Converted from a merchant steamer. Sea planes from "Alexander I" and "Nicholas I" 24.01.1916 participated in bombing Turkish port of Zonguldak and sinking transports there. Later participated in Trebizond landings – aircraft from the ship covered landing ships and acted as artillery observers for the battleships.
- Ruminia – Russian for "Romania". Hydro-avia-transport of the Black Sea Fleet. Converted from Romanian merchant steamer.
- Communa – Russian for "Commune". One of the hydro-avia-transports of the Bolshevik Volga Military Flotilla during the Russian Civil War. Participated in fighting against White movement fleets and armies on the Volga river.

== Sweden ==
- Jacob Bagge
- Dristigheten

== United Kingdom ==
- HMS Hermes protected cruiser converted to seaplane carrier in 1913
- HMS Ark Royal first purpose-built seaplane carrier, commissioned 1914
- HMS Empress (1914–1919) packet ship converted to seaplane carrier in 1914
- HMS Engadine packet ship converted to seaplane tender in 1914
- HMS Riviera (1914–1919) packet ship converted to seaplane tender in 1914
- HMS Campania ocean liner converted to seaplane tender in 1915
- HMS Anne freighter used as seaplane carrier
- HMS Raven II freighter used as seaplane carrier
- HMS Ben-my-Chree packet steamer converted to seaplane carrier in 1915
- HMS Vindex passenger ferry converted to seaplane carrier 1915
- HMS Manxman steamer converted to seaplane carrier in 1916
- HMS Pegasus purchased incomplete and converted to seaplane carrier 1917
- HMS M2 – M-class submarine converted to carry a seaplane in 1927
- HMS Albatross: seaplane tender in service from 1938 to 1945, former HMAS Albatross
- HMS Manela steamer converted to seaplane tender in 1939

== United States ==
For an explanation of the US Navy AV, AVD, and AVP seaplane tender (and other) designations see the Hull classification symbol article.

== Yugoslavia ==
- Zmaj entered service in 1930, converted to minelayer in 1937

== See also ==
- Aircraft cruiser, hybrid between cruisers and seaplane carriers
- Battlecarrier, hybrid between battleships and seaplane carriers
- Submarine aircraft carrier, submarine equipped with seaplanes
- Aircraft repair ship

== Bibliography ==
- Smythe, A. J. & Caruana, Joseph (1988). "Question 18/87". Warship International. XXV (3): 315. ISSN 0043-0374.
- Voss, Maurice (1989). "Question 14/88". Warship International. XXVI (2): 204–205. ISSN 0043-0374.
