= USS LST-696 =

Tank landing ship of the US Navy

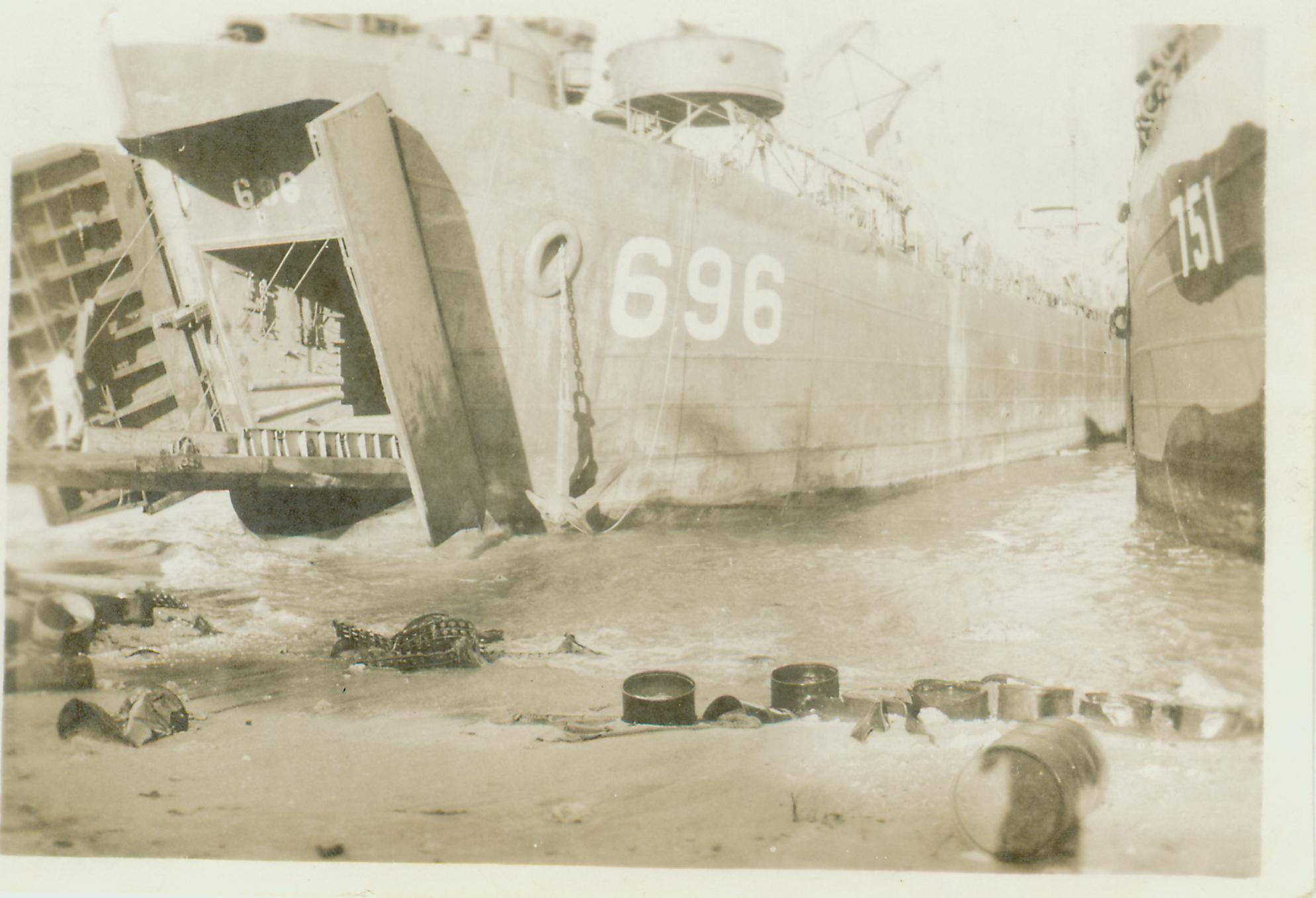
- Personal Photo by George Calvert, Seaman First Class, LST696

History

United States
- Name: USS LST-696
- Builder: Jeffersonville Boat and Machine Co., Jeffersonville, Indiana
- Laid down: 25 February 1944
- Launched: 25 April 1944
- Commissioned: 25 May 1944
- Decommissioned: 16 July 1946
- Stricken: 28 August 1946
- Honors and awards: 3 × battle stars
- Fate: Sold for scrapping, 19 May 1948

General characteristics
- Class & type: LST-542-class tank landing ship
- Displacement: 1,625 long tons (1,651 t) light; 4,080 long tons (4,145 t) full load
- Length: 328 ft (100 m)
- Beam: 50 ft (15 m)
- Draft: Unloaded : 2 ft 4 in (0.71 m) bow; 7 ft 6 in (2.29 m) stern; Loaded : 8 ft 3 in (2.51 m) bow; 14 ft 1 in (4.29 m) stern
- Propulsion: 2 × 900 hp (671 kW) General Motors 12-567 diesel engines, two shafts
- Speed: 12 knots (14 mph; 22 km/h)
- Range: 24,000 nmi (44,000 km) at 9 kn (17 km/h; 10 mph) (fully loaded)
- Boats & landing craft carried: 2 LCVPs
- Capacity: 1,600–1,900 short tons (1,500–1,700 t)
- Troops: Approx. 150
- Complement: 7 officers, 104 enlisted
- Armament: 2 × twin 40 mm Bofors guns; 4 × single 40 mm Bofors guns; 12 × 20 mm guns

USS LST-696 was an LST-542-class tank landing ship built for the United States Navy during World War II. LST-696 was laid down on 25 February 1944 at Jeffersonville, Indiana, by the Jeffersonville Boat & Machine Company; launched 25 April 1944; and commissioned 25 May 1944.

== Service history ==
During World War II, LST-696 was assigned to the Asiatic-Pacific Theater and earned three battle stars for World War II service.

- Morotai landings, September 1944
- Leyte landings, November 1944
- Lingayen Gulf landings, January 1945

Following the war LST-696 performed occupation duty in the Far East until April 1946. She was decommissioned on 16 July 1946, and struck from the Naval Vessel Register on 28 August 1946. She was sold for scrapping on 19 May 1948, to the Bethlehem Steel Company of Bethlehem, Pennsylvania.

== See also ==
- List of United States Navy LSTs
