= USS Okala =

United States Navy support craft

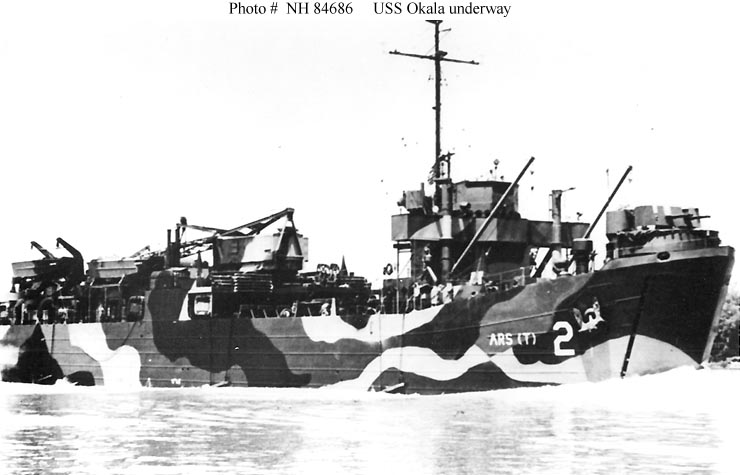

History

United States
- Name: USS Okala
- Namesake: Okala, an island off the coast of Molokai
- Builder: Jeffersonville Boat and Machine Company, Jeffersonville, Indiana
- Laid down: 1 December 1944
- Launched: 8 February 1945
- Commissioned: 28 June 1945
- Decommissioned: 5 August 1946
- Renamed: Okala, 23 December 1944
- Reclassified: ARST-2, 8 December 1944
- Stricken: 15 October 1946
- Fate: Sold 25 July 1947

General characteristics
- Type: Laysan Island-class salvage craft tender
- Displacement: 4,100 long tons (4,166 t) full
- Length: 328 ft (100 m)
- Beam: 50 ft (15 m)
- Draft: 11 ft 2 in (3.40 m)
- Propulsion: two General Motors 12-567A Diesel engines single Falk Main Reduction Gears four Diesel-drive 100 kW 120 / 240 V DC twin rudders twin propellers, 1,800 shp
- Speed: 11.6 knots (21.5 km/h; 13.3 mph)
- Complement: 269
- Armament: 2 × quad 40mm AA gun; 12 × single 20mm AA guns

USS Okala (ARST-2) was a Laysan Island-class salvage craft tender of the United States Navy.

== Service history ==
She was laid down on 1 December 1944 as LST-1099 by the Jeffersonville Boat and Machine Company in Jeffersonville, Indiana. She was named Okala on 23 December 1944 and commissioned on 28 June 1945 with Lieutenant Louis Silver commanding.

After a monthlong shakedown in the Gulf of Mexico, Okala transited the Panama Canal and steamed to Buckner Bay in Okinawa on 27 September. She was based there until transfer to Yokosuka in late November. She sailed to Seattle on 25 March 1946 and was decommissioned there on 5 August 1946, struck on 15 October 1946 and sold 25 July 1947.
