= List of hull classifications =

The list of hull classifications comprises an alphabetical list of the hull classification symbols used by the United States Navy to identify the type of a ship.

The combination of symbol and hull number identifies a modern Navy ship uniquely. A heavily modified or repurposed ship may receive a new symbol, and either retain the hull number or receive a new one. Also, the system of symbols has changed a number of times since it was introduced in 1907, so ships' symbols sometimes change without anything being done to the physical ship.

Many of the symbols listed here are not presently in use. The Naval Vessel Register maintains an online database of U.S. Navy ships. Some other navies also utilize this, such as the Japan Maritime Self-Defense Force (also adapting/adding some classifications).

The 1975 ship reclassification of cruisers, frigates, and ocean escorts brought U.S. Navy classifications into line with other nations' classifications, and eliminated the perceived "cruiser gap" with the Soviet Navy.

If a ship's hull classification symbol has "T-" preceding it, that symbolizes that it is a ship of the Military Sealift Command, with a primarily civilian crew.

== A ==
- AALC: Amphibious Assault Landing Craft
- AARCS: Air Raid Report Control Ship
- AASGP: Amphibious Assault Ship, General Purpose
- AB: Crane Ship
- ABD: Advance base dock
- ABSD: Advance base section dock
- ABU: Boom defence vessel
- AC: Collier
- ACM: Auxiliary Mine Layer
- ACR: Armored cruiser (pre-1920)
- ACS: Auxiliary crane ship
- ACV: Auxiliary Aircraft Carrier (1942, now CVE)
- AD: Destroyer tender
- ADC: Ammunition Storage Cargo ship
- ADG: Degaussing/Deperming Ship (ADG = Auxiliary Degaussing/Deperming General)
- ADS: Air Defense Ship
- AE: Ammunition ship
- AEFS: Fleet replenishment ship
- AEM: Ammunition Ship, Missile (retired)
- AF: Reefer ship / Refrigerated ship
- AFD: Auxiliary floating dry dock
- AFDB: Large auxiliary floating dry dock
- AFDL: Small auxiliary floating dry dock
- AFDM: Medium auxiliary floating dry dock
- AFDS: Auxiliary Fighter Directing Ship
- AFS: Combat Stores Ship
- AFSB: Afloat Forward Staging Base (also AFSB(I) for "interim", changed to ESB for Expeditionary Mobile Dock)
- AG: Miscellaneous Auxiliary (AG = Auxiliary General)
- AGB: Icebreaker
- AGC: Auxiliary general communication ship, or amphibious force flagship (now LCC)
- AGCL: Auxiliary General Communication (ship), Light
- AGD: Dredge Ship
- AGDE: Testing Ocean Escort
- AGDS: Deep Submergence Support Ship
- AGE: General Purpose Experimental Ship (AGE = Auxiliary General Experimental)
- AGEH: Hydrofoil research ship
- AGER: Environmental Research Ship
- AGF: Miscellaneous Command Ship
- AGFF: Testing Frigate
- AGH: Weather Ship (AGH = Auxiliary General Hydrometeorology)
- AGHS: Hydroplane research ship
- AGI: Intelligence Collecting Ship (Spy ship, AGI = Auxiliary General Intelligence)
- AGL: Mooring/buoy tender
- AGM: Missile Range Instrumentation Ship
- AGMR: Auxiliary Major Communication Relay Ship
- AGOR: Oceanographic Research Ship
- AGOS: Ocean Surveillance Ship
- AGP: Patrol Craft Tender
- AGR: Radar Picket Ship (retired)
- AGS: Survey ship / Oceanographic Research Ship
- AGSC: Coastal survey craft
- AGSL: Auxiliary General Satellite Launching ship
- AGSS: Auxiliary Submarine
- AGT: Target ship (AGT = Auxiliary General Target)
- AGTR: Technical research ship
- AH: Hospital ship
- AHC: Auxiliary Helicopter carrier
- AHP: Medical Evacuation Ship
- AIRIS: Aviation store issue ship
- AK: Cargo Ship
- AKA: Attack Cargo Ship (now LKA)
- AKB: Cargo Ship, Barge
- AKD: Cargo Ship, Dock (cargo dock ship)
- AKE: Underway Replenishment Dry Cargo Ship
- AKF: Float-on/Float-off (flo-flo) Ship
- AKFBM: Fleet ballistic missile trial ship
- AKI: Store Issue Ship
- AKL: Cargo Ship, Light
- AKN: Cargo Ship, Net laying
- AKR: Vehicle Cargo Ship (Cargo Ship, Roll-on/Roll-off)
- AKS: General stores issue ship
- AKSS: Cargo submarine
- AKV: Cargo Ship, Aircraft Transport
- AKX: Container ship
- AL: Auxiliary Lighter
- AM: Minesweeper or MCM tender
- AMb: Harbor Minesweeper
- AMc: Coastal Minesweeper
- AMCU: Underwater Mine Locater
- AMh: Harbor Minesweeper
- AMS: Motor Minesweeper
- AMS: Multi Purpose Support Ship (JMSDF)
- AN: Net Laying Ship
- ANL: Net Laying Ship
- AO: Fleet Oiler
- AOE: Fast Combat Support Ship
- AOG: Gasoline Tanker
- AOL: Light replenishment oiler (Note: In 2020 the US Navy began to develop this new type of ship, construction of the first is planned for 2026)
- AOR: Replenishment Oiler
- AOS: Specialized Oiler/Tanker
- AOS: Ocean Surveilance Ship (JMSDF)
- AOSS: Submarine Oiler (retired)
- AOT: Transport/Storage Oiler
- AP: Transport
- APA: Attack Transport (now LPA)
- APB: Self-Propelled Barracks ship
- APb: Base repair ship
- APC: Transport, Coastal
- APD: High Speed Transport (now LPR)
- APF: Administrative flagship
- APG: Coastal artillery supply ship
- APH: Ambulance Transport
- APL: Barracks Craft, non self-propelled
- APM: Artillery Transport (1942, now LSD)
- APN: Artillery Transport, non Self-Propelled
- APP: Troop Barge
- APR: Cargo ship, rescue / med evac
- APS: Minelaying Submarine (retired)
- APSS: Transport Submarine (retired)
- APT: Troop transport
- APV: Aircraft transport
- APY: Large Y-boat (large Rigid-hulled inflatable boat)
- AR: Repair ship
- ARb: base repair ship
- ARB: Repair Ship, Battle damage
- ARC: Cable Repair Ship
- ARD: Auxiliary Repair Dry Dock
- ARDC: Auxiliary Repair Dry Dock, Concrete
- ARDM: Medium Auxiliary Repair Dry Dock
- ARG: Marine engine repair ship
- ARH: Heavy repair ship (ARH = Auxiliary Repair, Heavy)
- ARIS: Space exploration tracking ship
- ARL: Small Repair Ship (ARL = Auxiliary Repair, Light)
- ARM: Heavy machinery repair ship (ARM = Auxiliary Repair, Machinery, heavy)
- ARR: Repair ship, radioactive
- ARS: Rescue/Salvage Ship
- ARSD: Salvage Lifting Ship
- ARST: Auxiliary Rescue Salvage Tender
- ARV: Aircraft repair ship
- ARVA: Aircraft repair ship, airframe
- ARVE: Aviation engine repair ship
- ARVH: Helicopter repair ship
- AS: Submarine tender
- ASE: Submarine ammunition supply ship
- ASE: Auxiliary Ship Experiment (JMSDF)
- ASPB: Assault Support Patrol Boat
- ASR: Submarine Rescue Ship
- ASSA: Cargo Submarine
- ASSP: Transport Submarine (retired)
- AST: Training Support Ship (JMSDF)
- ASU: Auxiliary Ship Utility (JMSDF)
- ASY: Auxiliary vessel Special service Yacht (JMSDF)
- AT: Ocean Going Tug
- ATA: Auxiliary Ocean Tug
- ATC: Armored Troop Carrier
- ATF: Fleet Ocean Tug
- ATL: Atlantic tank landing ship (1942, now LST)
- ATO: Auxiliary Tug, Old
- ATR: Rescue tug (ATR = Auxiliary Tug, Rescue)
- ATS: Salvage and Rescue Ship
- AV: Seaplane Tender
- AVB: Aviation Logistics Support Ship
- AVC: Large catapult lighter (for launching seaplanes)
- AVD: Seaplane Tender Destroyer (retired)
- AVG: Auxiliary Aircraft Ferry (1941-2, now CVE)
- AVM: Missile trial ship
- AVP: Seaplane Tender, light
- AVR: Aircraft Rescue Ship
- AVS: Helicopter training ship
- AVT: Auxiliary Aircraft Landing Training Ship
- AW: Distilling Ship
- AWK: Water Tanker
- AWT: Water Tanker
- AX: Training ship
- AXS: Training ship, sail
- AXT: Training ship tender
- AZ: Airship Tender (retired)

== B ==
- B: Battleship (pre-1920)
- BB: Battleship
- BBG: Guided-missile battleship
- BBGN: Nuclear-powered guided-missile battleship
- BM: Monitor (retired)

== C ==
- C: Cruiser (pre-1920 Protected Cruisers and Peace Cruisers)
- CA: (first series) Cruiser (retired, composed all surviving pre-1920 Protected and Peace Cruisers)
- CA: (second series) Heavy Cruiser, category later renamed Gun Cruiser (retired)
- CAG: Heavy Cruiser, Guided Missile (retired)
- CB: Large cruiser (retired)
- CBC: Large Command Cruiser (retired, never used operationally)
- CC: Battlecruiser (retired, never used operationally)
- CC: (second usage) Command Cruiser (retired); cruiser
- CG: Guided Missile Cruiser
- CGN: Guided Missile Cruiser (Nuclear-Propulsion)
- CL: Light Cruiser (retired)
- CLAA: Antiaircraft Cruiser (retired)
- CLG: Light Cruiser, Guided Missile (retired)
- CLGN: Light Cruiser, Guided Missile (Nuclear propulsion) (retired)
- CLK: Hunter-Killer Cruiser (abolished 1951)
- CM: Minelayer
- CMc: Coastal Minelayer
- CS: Scout Cruiser (retired)
- CSGN: Strike Cruiser (Proposed, never used operationally)
- CV: Aircraft carrier
- CVA: Attack Aircraft Carrier (retired)
- CVB: Large Aircraft Carrier (category merged into CVA, 1952)
- CVE: Escort aircraft carrier (retired) (1943-retirement of type)
- CVHA: Assault Helicopter Aircraft Carrier (retired in favor of various L-series amphibious assault ship hull codes)
- CVHE: Escort Aircraft Carrier, Helicopter (retired)
- CVL: Light aircraft carrier (retired)
- CVM: Aircraft Carrier Multirole (JMSDF)
- CVN: Aircraft Carrier (Nuclear-Propulsion)
- CVS: Antisubmarine Aircraft Carrier (retired)
- CVT: Training Aircraft Carrier (changed to AVT (Auxiliary))
- CVU: Utility Aircraft Carrier (retired)

== D ==
- D: Destroyer (pre-1920)
- DD: Destroyer
- DDE: Escort Destroyer (category abolished 1962)
- DDG: Guided missile Destroyer
- DDH: Helicopter Destroyer (JMSDF)
- DDK: Hunter-Killer Destroyer (category merged into DDE, 4 March 1950)
- DDR: Radar Picket Destroyer (retired)
- DE: Destroyer Escort (World War II, later became Ocean Escort)
- DE: Ocean Escort (abolished 30 June 1975)
- DEG: Guided Missile Ocean Escort (abolished 30 June 1975)
- DER: Radar Picket Destroyer Escort (abolished 30 June 1975)
- DL: Destroyer Leader (later Frigate) (retired)
- DLG: Guided Missile Frigate (abolished 30 June 1975)
- DLGN: Guided Missile Frigate (Nuclear-Propulsion) (abolished 30 June 1975)
- DM: Destroyer Minelayer (retired)
- DMS: Destroyer Minesweeper (retired)
- DSRV: Deep Submergence Rescue Vehicle
- DSV: Deep Submergence Vehicle

== E ==
- EMS: Expeditionary Medical Ship, a EPF modified into a hospital ship
- ESD: Expeditionary Transfer Dock
- ESB: Expeditionary Mobile Base (a variant of ESD, formerly AFSB)
- EPF: Expeditionary Fast Transport

== F ==
- FF: Frigate (retired)
- FFG: Guided Missile Frigate
- FFH: Fast Frigate Helo
- FFL: Light frigate
- FFR: Radar Picket Frigate (retired)
- FFT: Frigate (Reserve Training) (retired)
- FS: Corvette
- FSG: Guided-missile corvette

== I ==
- IX: Unclassified miscellaneous vessel
- IXSS: Unclassified Miscellaneous Submarine

== J ==
- JHSV: Joint High Speed Vessel (changed to EPF)

== L ==
- LB: Landing Boat
- LBE: Landing Barge, Emergency repair
- LBP: Landing Boat, Personnel
- LBS: Landing Barge, Support
- LBV: Landing Boat, Vehicle
- LC: Landing Craft
- LCA: Landing Craft Assault
- LCA(HR) Landing Craft Assault (Hedgerow)
- LCAC: Landing Craft Air Cushioned
- LCB: Landing Craft, Barge
- LCC: Landing Craft, Command (WW2)
- LCC: Landing Ship, Command (duplicate use)
- LCE: Landing Craft, Emergency repair
- LCEOP: Landing Craft, Engine Overhaul Party
- LCF: Landing Craft, Flak
- LCFF: Landing Craft, Flotilla Flagship
- LCG: Landing Craft, Gun
- LCGL: Landing Craft, Gun, Large
- LCGM: Landing Craft, Gun, Medium
- LCH: Landing Craft, Heavy
- LCI: Landing Craft, Infantry
- LCIFF: Landing Craft, Infantry, Flotilla Flagship
- LCIFL: Landing Craft, Infantry, Flotilla Leader
- LCIG: Landing Craft, Infantry, Gun
- LCIL: Landing Craft, Infantry, Large
- LCIM: Landing Craft, Infantry, Mortar
- LCIR: Landing Craft, Infantry, Rocket
- LCL: Landing Craft, Logistic
- LCM: Landing Craft Mechanized
- LCN: Landing Craft, Navigation
- LCOCU: Landing Craft, Obstacle Clearing Unit
- LCP: Landing Craft, Personnel
- LCPA: Landing Craft, Personnel, Air-Cushioned
- LCPL: Landing Craft, Personnel, Large
- LCPM: Landing Craft, Personnel, Medium
- LCPN: Landing Craft, Personnel, Nested
- LCPP: Landing Craft, Personnel, Plastic
- LCPR: Landing Craft, Personnel, Ramped
- LCPS: Landing Craft, Personnel, Survey
- LCRL: Landing Craft, Rubber, Large
- LCPR: Landing Craft, Rubber, Rocket
- LCRS: Landing Craft, Rubber, Small
- LCRU: Landing Craft, Recovery Unit
- LCS: Littoral Combat Ship
- LCSL: Landing Craft, Support (Large) (World War II era)
- LCSM: Landing Craft, Support, Medium
- LCSR: Landing Craft, Support, Rocket
- LCSS: Landing Craft, Support, Small
- LCT: Landing Craft, Tank (World War II era)
- LCTA: Landing Craft, Tank, Armored
- LCU: Landing Craft, Utility
- LCV: Landing Craft, Vehicle
- LCVP: Landing Craft, Vehicle and Personnel
- LES: Landing boat, support
- LFS: Amphibious fire support ship
- LHA: Landing Helicopter Assault
- LHD: Landing Helicopter Dock
- LKA: Amphibious Cargo Ship (out of commission)
- LPA: Landing Platform, Amphibious
- LPD: Amphibious Transport, Dock (aka Landing Platform, Dock)
- LPH: Landing Platform, Helicopter (out of commission)
- LPR: Amphibious transport, small
- LPSS: Amphibious Transport Submarine (retired)
- LSA: Landing Ship, Assault
- LSB: Landing Ship, Bombardment
- LSD: Landing Ship, Dock
- LSF: Landing Ship, Flagship
- LSFF: Landing Ship, Flotilla Flagship
- LSH: Landing Ship, Heavy or Helicopter
- LSHL: Landing Ship, Headquarter, Large
- LSI: Landing Ship, Infantry
- LSIG: Landing Ship, Infantry, Gun
- LSIL: Landing Ship, Infantry (Large) (formerly LCIL)
- LSIM: Landing Ship, Infantry, Medium
- LSIR: Landing Ship, Infantry, Rocket
- LSL: Landing Ship, Logistics
- LSM: Landing Ship, Medium
- LSMR: Landing Ship, Medium, Rocket
- LSR: Landing Ship, Rocket
- LSS: Landing Ship, Support
- LSSL: Landing Ship, Support (Large) (formerly LCSL)
- LST: Landing Ship, Tank
- LSTH: Landing Ship, Tank, Hospital
- LSU: Landing Ship, Utility
- LSV: Landing Ship Vehicle
- LWT: Amphibious Warping Tug

== M ==
- MB: Motor Boat
- MCM: Mine Countermeasures Ship
- MCS: Mine Countermeasures Support Ship
- MHA: Minehunter, Auxiliary
- MHC: Minehunter, Coastal
- MHI: Mine Hunter Inshore
- MLC: Motorized Landing Craft
- MLP: Mobile Landing Platform (changed to ESD)
- MM: Minelayer
- MMA: Minelayer, Auxiliary
- MMC: Minelayer, Coastal
- MMD: Minelayer, fast (formerly DM)
- MMF: Minelayer, Fleet
- MON: Monitor
- MS: Minesweeper or Motor ship
- MSA: Minesweeper, Auxiliary
- MSB: Minesweeping Boat
- MSC: Minesweeper, Coastal
- MSD: Minesweeping drone
- MSF: Minesweeper, Fleet
- MSI: Minesweeper, Inshore
- MSL: Minesweeper, Launch
- MSM: Minesweeper, Medium
- MSO: Minesweeper - Ocean
- MSR: Minesweeper, Riverine
- MSS: Minesweeper, Special
- MST: Minesweeper, Tender (JMSDF)
- MV: Merchant Vessel

== N ==
- NR: Submersible Research Vehicle

== P ==
- PACV: Patrol craft, air cushioned vehicle
- PB: Patrol boat
- PBR: Patrol boat, River
- PC: Patrol craft, originally Sub chaser
- PCC: Patrol craft, coastal
- PCC: Submarine Chaser, Control
- PCE: Patrol Escort
- PCEC: Patrol Escort, Coastal
- PCER: Patrol Escort, Rescue
- PCF: Vietnam Patrol Craft Fast
- PCH: Patrol craft, hydrofoil
- PCS: Patrol Craft, Sweeper
- PCSC: Patrol Craft, Submarine Chaser
- PCV: Primary Control Vessel
- PE: Eagle boat of World War I
- PF: World War II frigate, based on British River class.
- PFG: Original designation of USS Oliver Hazard Perry (FFG-7)
- PG: Gunboat, later Patrol combatant
- PG: Guided Missile Patrol Boat (JMSDF)
- PGH: Patrol Combatant, Hydrofoil
- PHM: Patrol, Hydrofoil Missile
- PM: River Monitor
- PR: Riverine gun ship
- PT: Patrol torpedo boat
- PTC: Patrol torpedo boat subchaser
- PTF: Patrol torpedo boat, fast
- PY: Seagoing gun ship
- PT: Patrol Torpedo Boat (World War II)

== S ==
- SC: Cruiser submarine (retired)
- SF: Fleet Submarine (retired)
- SM: Submarine Minelayer (retired)
- SP: Section Patrol
- SS: Attack Submarine (diesel-electric power)
- SSA: Auxiliary/Cargo Submarine (diesel-electric power)
- SSAN: Auxiliary/Cargo Submarine Nuclear
- SSB: Ballistic Missile Submarine (diesel-electric power)
- SSBN: Ballistic Missile Submarine Nuclear
- SSC: Coastal Submarine (diesel-electric power), over 150 tons
- SSG: Guided Missile Submarine (diesel-electric power)
- SSGN: Guided Missile Submarine Nuclear
- SSI: Attack Submarine (diesel air-independent propulsion)
- SSK: Hunter-Killer/ASW Submarine (retired)
- SSKN: Hunter-Killer/ASW Submarine Nuclear (retired)
- SSM: Midget Submarine, under 150 tons
- SSN: Attack Submarine Nuclear
- SSO: Submarine Oiler (retired)
- SSP: Submarine Transport (former use)
- SSP: Attack Submarine (diesel air-independent power, later use, alternate use)
- SSQ: Auxiliary Submarine, Communications (retired)
- SSQN: Auxiliary Submarine, Communications Nuclear (retired)
- SSR: Radar Picket Submarine (retired)
- SSRN: Radar Picket Submarine Nuclear (retired)
- SST: Training Submarine (diesel-electric power)
- SSV: Submarine Aircraft Carrier (never used)

== T ==
- TCD: Small LSD
- TGB: Icebreaking Tug
- TR: Torpedo Retriever
- TSS: Training Submarine
- TV: Training Vessel (JMSDF)
- TWR: Torpedo Weapon Retriever

== W ==
- W: United States Coast Guard

== X ==
- X: Submersible Craft, also used to denote experimental craft.

== Y ==
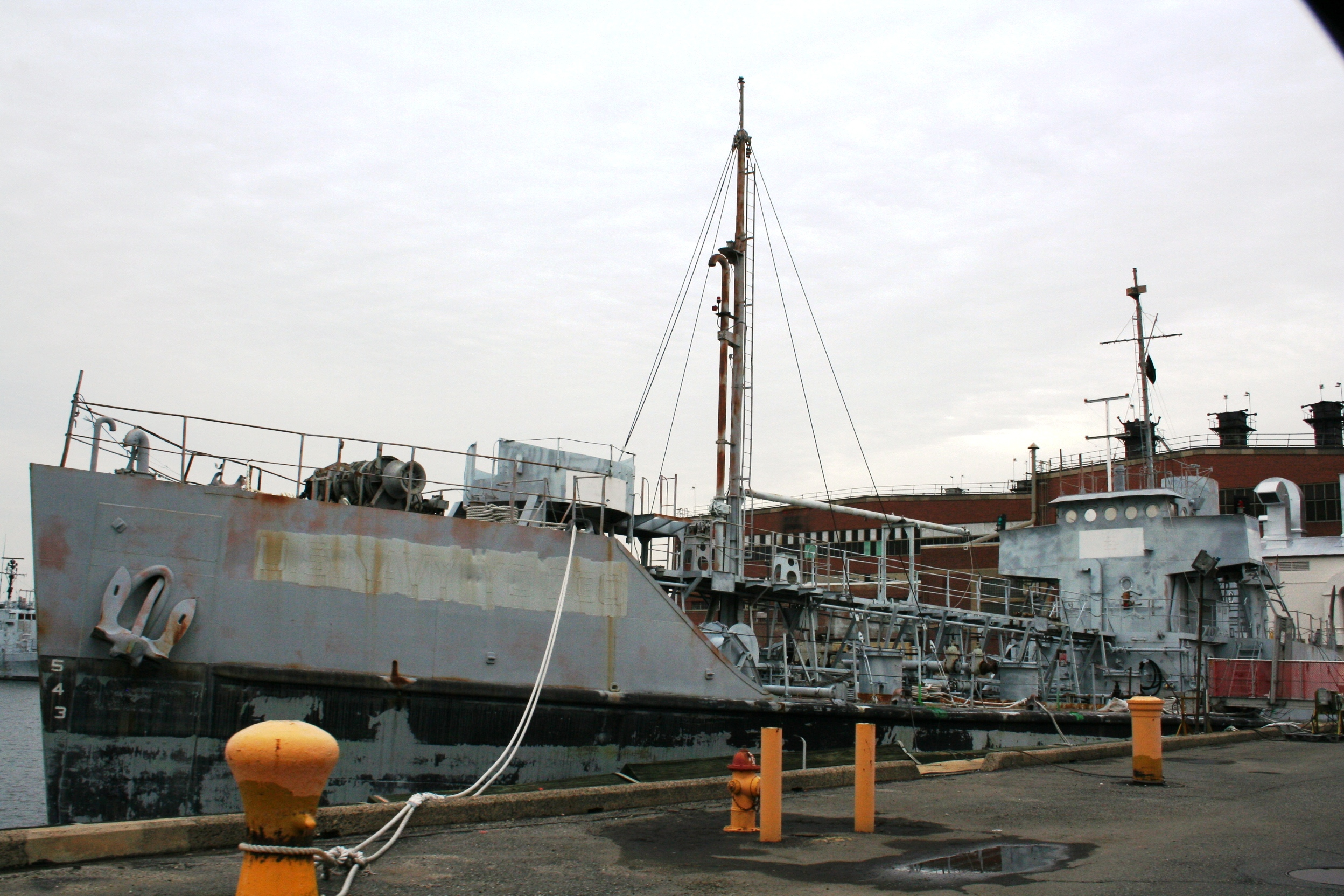
YO 260 at Philadelphia Naval Shipyard, Jan 2008

- YA: Ash lighter
- YAGR: Oceanic radar station
- YAGT: Target barge
- YC: Open Lighter
- YCD: Oil storage barge
- YCF: Car Float
- YCV: Aircraft Transportation Lighter
- YD: Floating Crane
- YDG: Degaussing tender
- YDT: Diving Tender
- YE: Ammunition storage barge
- YF: Covered Lighter
- YFB: Ferry Boat or Launch
- YFD: Yard Floating Dry Dock
- YFN: Covered Lighter (non-self propelled)
- YFNB: Large Covered Lighter (non-self propelled)
- YFND: Dry Dock Companion Craft (non-self propelled)
- YFNX: Lighter (Special purpose) (non-self propelled)
- YFP: Floating Power Barge
- YFR: Refrigerated Cover Lighter
- YFRN: Refrigerated Covered Lighter (non-self propelled)
- YFRT: Range Tender
- YFU: Harbor Utility Craft
- YG: Garbage Lighter
- YGN: Garbage Lighter (non-self propelled)
- YH: Ambulance craft
- YHB: House boat
- YHLC: Heavy (salvage) lifting craft
- YHT: Heading scow
- YLA: Open lighter, landing
- YLLC: Salvage Lift Craft
- YM: Dredge
- YMN: Dredge (non-self propelled)
- YMS: Motor Minesweeper, Auxiliary
- YMT: Motor tug
- YN: Net tender
- YND: Net tender, district
- YNG: Gate Craft
- YNT: Net Tender
- YO: Fuel Oil Barge
- YOG: Gasoline Barge
- YOGN: Gasoline Barge (non-self propelled)
- YON: Fuel Oil Barge (non-self propelled)
- YOS: Oil Storage Barge
- YP: Patrol Craft, Training
- YPD: Floating Pile Driver
- YR: Floating Workshop
- YRB: Repair and Berthing Barge
- YRBM: Repair, Berthing and Messing Barge
- YRDH: Floating Dry Dock Workshop (Hull)
- YRDM: Floating Dry Dock Workshop (Machine)
- YRR: Radiological Repair Barge
- YRST: Salvage Craft Tender
- YSD: Seaplane Wrecking Derrick
- YSR: Sludge Removal Barge
- YT: Harbor Tug (craft later assigned YTB, YTM, or YTM classifications)
- YTB: Large Harbor Tug
- YTL: Small Harbor Tug
- YTM: Medium Harbor Tug
- YTR: Rescue tug
- YTT: Torpedo Trials Craft
- YV: UAV recovery craft
- YW: Water Barge
- YWD: Distilling craft
- YWN: Water Barge (non-self propelled)

== Z ==
- ZR: Rigid Airship
- ZRCV: Rigid Airship Aircraft Carrier
- ZRS: Rigid Airship Scout

All other airships were aircraft, not commissioned ships.

== See also ==
- Ship prefix
