= USS Laysan Island =

1945 Laysan Island-class salvage craft tender

History

United States
- Name: USS Laysan Island
- Namesake: Laysan Island
- Builder: Jeffersonville Boat and Machine Company, Jeffersonville, Indiana
- Laid down: 6 December 1944
- Launched: 27 January 1945
- Commissioned: 5 June 1945
- Decommissioned: 21 April 1947
- Renamed: Laysan Island, 23 December 1944
- Reclassified: ARST-1, 8 December 1944
- Stricken: 1 June 1973
- Fate: Sold for scrap 1 January 1994

General characteristics
- Type: Laysan Island-class salvage craft tender
- Displacement: 3,800 long tons (3,861 t) full
- Length: 328 ft (100 m)
- Beam: 50 ft (15 m)
- Draft: 11 ft 2 in (3.40 m)
- Propulsion: two General Motors 12-567A Diesel engines single Falk Main Reduction Gears four Diesel-drive 100 kW 120 V/240 V DC twin rudders twin propellers, 1,800 shp
- Speed: 11.6 knots (21.5 km/h; 13.3 mph)
- Complement: 269
- Armament: 2 × quad 40mm AA gun; 12 × single 20mm AA guns

USS Laysan Island (ARST-1) was a Laysan Island-class salvage craft tender of the United States Navy. She was converted from a Landing Ship, Tank in December 1944 and conducted salvage operations in Manila Bay. Laysan Island was decommissioned in 1947 and mothballed, struck 1973 and sold for scrap in 1994.

== Service history ==
She was laid down on 6 December 1944 as LST-1098 at the Jeffersonville Boat & Machine Company in Jeffersonville, Indiana. She was named Laysan Island on 23 December 1944 and commissioned on 5 June 1945.

After a monthlong shakedown in the Gulf of Mexico, she departed Galveston on 17 July for the Pacific. Laysan Island transited the Panama Canal on 25 July and arrived in Manila Bay on 6 September 1945. For the next sven months, she operated out of Manila Bay. assisting in salvage operations there.

Laysan Island offloaded salvage equipment at Calicoan Island in early April 1946, then steamed to Seattle on 29 May. She remained there until 8 October and departed for San Pedro on 8 October. Serving at San Pedro until 18 April 1947, she was towed to San Diego and decommissioned on 21 April 1947. She was laid up in the Pacific Reserve Fleet, struck 1 June 1973 and sold for scrapping twenty years later by the Defense Reutilization and Marketing Office.
