= Laysan Island-class salvage craft tender =

United States Navy ship design

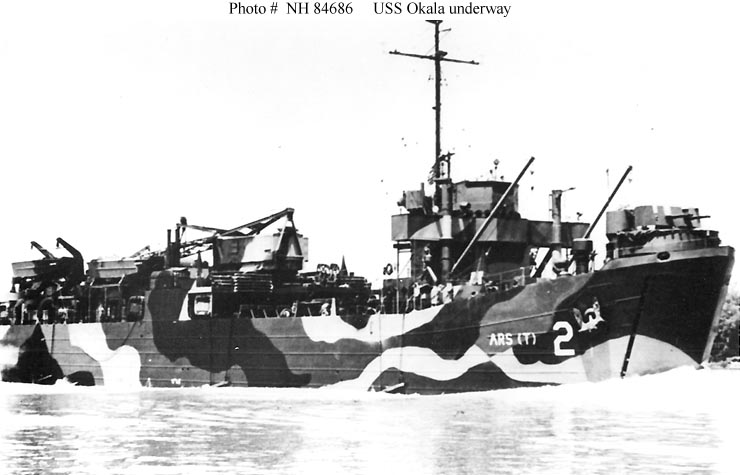
- USS Okala

Class overview
- Name: Laysan Island class
- Operators: United States Navy
- Preceded by: None
- Succeeded by: USS Tackle
- Built: 1944–1945
- In commission: 1945–1947
- Planned: 3
- Completed: 3
- Retired: 3

General characteristics
- Type: Salvage craft tender
- Displacement: 4,100 tons (full load)
- Length: 328 ft (100 m)
- Beam: 50 ft (15 m)
- Draft: 11 ft 2 in (3.40 m)
- Propulsion: 2 General Motors 12-567A diesel engines; Single Falk main reduction gears; four Diesel-drive 100 kW 120 V / 240 V D.C. twin rudders; 2 propellers, 1,800 shp (1,300 kW)
- Speed: 11.6 knots (13.3 mph; 21.5 km/h)
- Complement: 269
- Armament: 2 × quad 40 mm AA gun; 12 × single 20 mm AA guns

The Laysan Island class were three salvage craft tenders serving with the United States Navy during World War II. They were converted from landing ship tanks in response to a Commander Service Forces, Pacific Fleet request that for tenders to support salvage vessels during amphibious operations which would carry pumps, air compressors, repair materials and firefighting equipment. They were also to include extra divers on board and repair facilities for the salvage ships. The ships of the class were built as LSTs and modified to tenders during construction at the Jeffersonville Boat and Machine Company.

== Ships in class ==
Name	Launched	Commissioned	Fate
Laysan Island (ARST-1)	27 January 1945	5 June 1945	Scrapped 1994
Okala (ARST-2)	8 February 1945	28 June 1945	Converted to merchant ship
Palmyra (ARST-3)	20 February 1945	28 July 1945	Scrapped 1974
