= HNLMS Zuiderkruis (1923) =

Royal Netherlands Navy Auxiliary

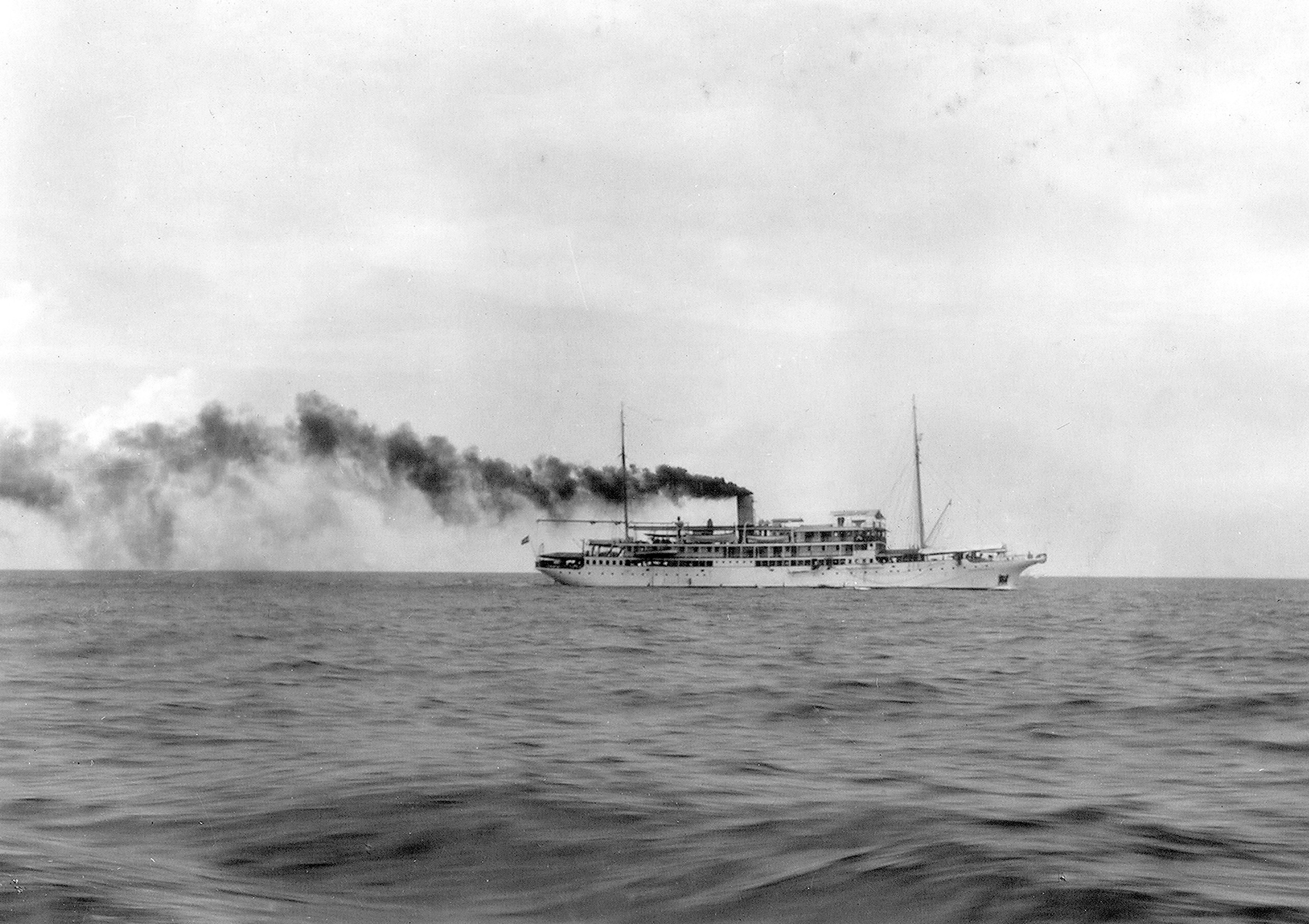
- HNLMS Zuiderkruis

History

Netherlands
- Name: Zuiderkruis
- Namesake: Zuiderkruis
- Builder: Nederlandsche Scheepsbouw Maatschappij, Amsterdam
- Laid down: 20 January 1922
- Launched: 17 November 1923
- Commissioned: March 1924
- In service: 26 March 1943
- Out of service: 1950
- Renamed: Bimasakti (As flagship of the Indonesian Navy from 1950 to 1952)
- Fate: Transferred to Indonesia in 1950, scrapped in 1952

General characteristics
- Type: Auxiliary, submarine tender, seaplane tender
- Displacement: 2,661 t (2,619 long tons) standard
- Length: 87.20 m (286 ft 1 in)
- Beam: 11.2 m (36 ft 9 in)
- Draught: 4.30 m (14 ft 1 in)
- Installed power: 1,600 hp (1,200 kW)
- Propulsion: 2 × Werkspoor triple expansion engines powering 2 shafts
- Speed: 12.5 knots (23.2 km/h; 14.4 mph)
- Complement: 97
- Armament: 2 × single 150 mm (5.9 in) Cannons (Optional, not equipped); 2 × single 76 mm (3.0 in) British HA/LA guns; 2 × single 20 mm (0.79 in) Oerlikon guns; 4 × single .30 Colt machine guns

HNLMS Zuiderkruis was a Royal Netherlands Navy auxiliary ship. Originally constructed for the Government Navy, she was transferred to the Royal Netherlands Navy in 1938. Laid down as a cable layer with the option for quick conversion to auxiliary cruiser, she came equipped with mounts that would allow the installation of two 5.9-inch (150 mm) cannons and facilities to accommodate two floatplanes.

Upon her transfer to the Navy, she was converted to a supply ship serving as submarine- and seaplane tender and be recommissioned in March 1939.

== Service history ==
Zuiderkruis served throughout the Second World War. After the fall of Java, the ship escaped through Tjilatjap to Ceylon where she served the rest of the war with the British Eastern Fleet.

After the war ended, Zuiderkruis returned to the Dutch East Indies and served there until 1947 when she was rebuilt as a survey vessel. In 1950 she was transferred to the Indonesian Navy and renamed Bimasakti. She served as the flagship of the Indonesian Navy until being scrapped in 1952.
