= USCG Deployable Pursuit Boat =

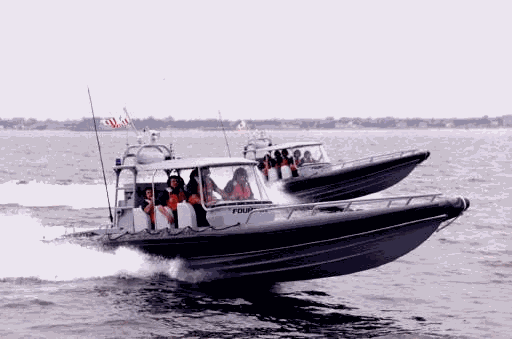
U.S. Coast Guard 11.6 m (38') deployable pursuit boat

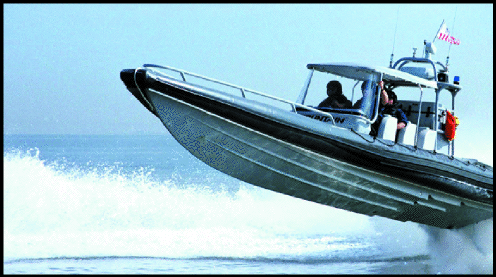
U.S. Coast Guard 11.6 m (38') deployable pursuit boat

The 11.6 m (38 ft) Deployable Pursuit Boat (DPB) gives the United States Coast Guard a new capability in the Caribbean Sea and Eastern Pacific. About 85% of the cocaine smuggled through those areas travels on "go-fasts", 9 to 12 m (30 to 40 ft) high speed craft which each carry 1,000 to 2,000 kg of illegal narcotics. Working with other Coast Guard assets, DPB crews are able to intercept and board "go-fasts", and significantly reduce the flow of drugs through the transit zone.
