= USNS Range Recoverer =

American tracking ship

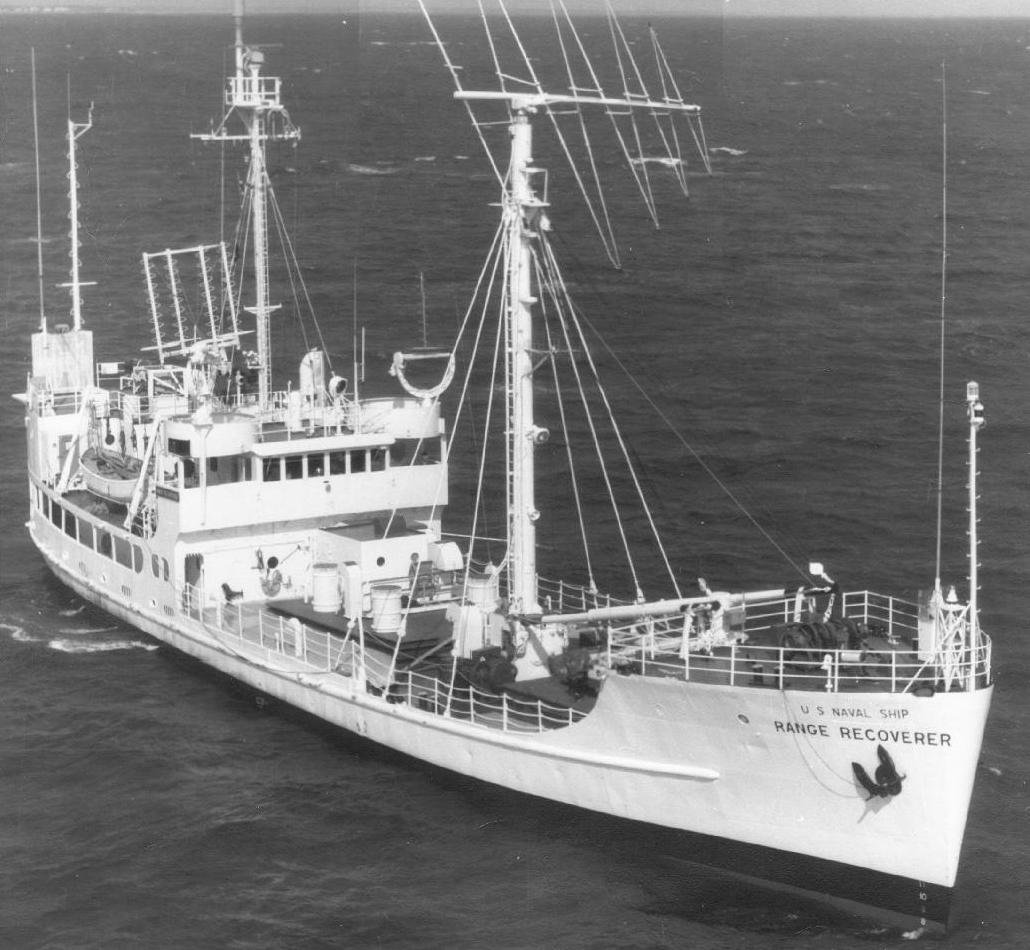
- USNS Range Recoverer (T-AGM-2)

History

United States
- Name: FS-278 (1944-1960); Range Recoverer (1960-)
- Namesake: A ship stationed in the anticipated landing area of a space vehicle
- Builder: Wheeler Shipbuilding Corporation, Whitestone, New York
- Completed: for the U.S.Army in 1944 as FS-278
- Acquired: by the Navy April 1960
- In service: 22 June 1960 as USNS Range Recoverer (T-AG-161)
- Out of service: 1972
- Reclassified: 27 November 1960 as Missile Range Instrumentation Ship (T-AGM-2); as Range Tender YFRT-524 (date unknown)
- Refit: Pacific Ship Repair, San Francisco, California (as missile tracker)
- Identification: IMO number: 7641671; MMSI number: 367108860; Callsign: WYQ2585
- Fate: Sold for scrapping, 1 November 1974; Serving as a fishing vessel as of 2016

General characteristics
- Type: missile range instrumentation ship
- Displacement: 550 tons light; 935 tons full load
- Length: 176 ft 6 in (53.80 m)
- Beam: 32 ft (9.8 m)
- Draft: 11 ft 5 in (3.48 m)
- Propulsion: Diesel, two 500hp GE Diesel engines, twin screws
- Speed: 10 knots
- Complement: 24 personnel
- Armament: none

USNS Range Recoverer (T-AG-161/T-AGM-2/YFRT-524) was a missile range instrumentation ship responsible for providing radar and/or telemetry track data on missiles launched from American launch sites.

She was built during World War II as U.S. Army U.S. Army FS-278, and was acquired by the U.S. Navy in 1960 as miscellaneous auxiliary and was converted into a missile tracking ship. She continued her missile tracking until being placed out of service in 1972, at which time she was reclassified range tender YFRT-524, and eventually sold for scrap in 1974. However, she avoided the scrapyards and served as a fishing vessel until at least 2016.

== U.S. Army ==
FS-278 was built for the Army in 1944, by the Wheeler Shipbuilding Corp., Whitestone, New York. FS-278 was a Coast Guard-crewed Army vessel commissioned at New York on 25 November 1944 departing New York on 17 December 1944, for the Southwest Pacific where she operated at Peleliu, Palawan, etc. during the war. Command transferred to LT A. W. Engle, USCGR on 25 June 1945. From 28 August until 20 September FS-278 transported General Douglas MacArthur's defense planning staff for the Philippine Islands. She was decommissioned 3 October 1945.

== U.S. Navy ==
The ship was acquired by the Navy in April 1960; converted by Pacific Ship Repair, San Francisco, California; and placed in service with the Military Sea Transportation Service (MSTS) as T-AG-161 on 22 June 1960.

== Missile tracking activities ==
Named Range Recoverer on 12 July, she reported to the Navy's Pacific Missile Range in August 1960. At the time Navy had command and control authority over nearly all Vandenberg Air Force Base launches and the range. (Note: From May 1958 until transfer of range facilities ordered 16 November 1963 and effective 1 July 1964 the Pacific Missile Range was under Navy. Range Recoverer transferred to the Atlantic before the range was transferred to Air Force and was never an Air Force Western Test Range ship.) On 27 November she was reclassified a missile range instrumentation ship and designated T-AGM-2. She is equipped with telemetry, data processing and radio instruments as well as recovery facilities to retrieve nose cones.

Crewed by the Civil Service of the Military Sea Transportation Service, Range Recoverer served first as a telemetry and recovery ship on the Pacific Missile Range where she launched, tested, and evaluated the Regulus missile. In July 1962 Range Recoverer shifted to Little Creek, Virginia, to support the NASA facility at Wallops Island, Virginia. NASA technical party operators used on board equipment, including helix antennas, data recording systems and a communications suite with direction finders to locate and recover payloads. There she replaced two T-1 tankers, Dumont and Whitlock, damaged during a storm.

Since that time, into 1970, Range Recoverer operated out of Little Creek primarily between Wallops Island and the splash down area near Bermuda.

== Other services provided ==
During the mid-sixties the ship traveled to Greece for coordinated research on a solar eclipse and was visited by the Greek royal family. NASA, assisting other government agencies, has also loaned Range Recoverer to the Virginia Institute of Marine Science and the Woods Hole Oceanographic Institute, to conduct oceanographic surveys off the coast of Virginia.

== Final disposition ==
Range Recoverer was placed out-of-service in 1972 and reclassified as range tender YFRT-524. She was struck from the Navy List (unknown date) and sold for scrap 1 November 1974.

Despite being sold for scrap, Range Recoverer remained extant until at least 2016 as the Virginia-based fishing vessel Reedville.

== See also ==
- Missile Range Instrumentation Ship
