= Jeffboat =

American inland shipyard in Jeffersonville, Indiana

- Industry: Shipbuilding
- Predecessor: Howard Shipyard, Jeffersonville Boat Company
- Founded: 1834 as Howard Shipyard in Jeffersonville, Indiana, US
- Founder: James Howard
- Defunct: April 23, 2018
- Fate: Shut down in 2018
- Headquarters: Jeffersonville, Indiana

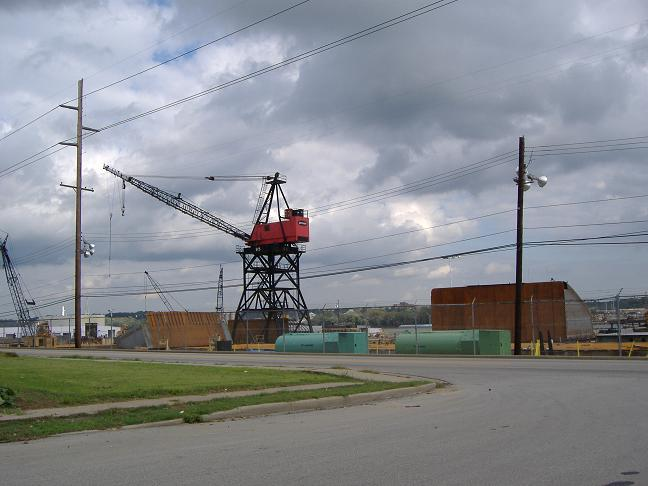
Jeffboat

Jeffboat Marine Repair

Jeffboat Marine Repair - Kort nozzle repair

Jeffboat was a shipyard in Jeffersonville, Indiana, founded by James Howard in 1834, a builder of steamboats. The company was owned by the Howard family until it was sold leading up to World War II. Following the war, it became known as the Jeffersonville Boat and Machine Company and later changed its name to Jeffboat, the more commonly used short form of its name. The company was the largest inland shipbuilder in the United States and the second-largest builder of barges before it closed in 2018.

== Origin ==
Jeffboat was originally established as the Howard Shipyards in 1834 by James Howard when he started his first boat, the Hyperion. The Howard family controlled the company for 107 years, building over 3,000 ships.

=== 19th-century steamboats ===
The Joe Fowler is a former steamboat built at the Howard Shipyard in 1888. The sternwheeler was designed for packet service between Evansville, Indiana and Paducah, Kentucky. Joe Fowler was a United States Mail carrier, and after seven years of service, had logged over 327,000 miles and transported over 152,000 passengers without a fatal accident. In 1914, new owners replaced the steamer with high-pressure boilers designed for the western rivers. After this time, Joe Fowler ran excursions around the Pittsburgh and Wheeling, West Virginia areas, before hosting a cruise down the Ohio and Mississippi rivers for Mardi Gras in New Orleans, and a long summer cruise from Pittsburgh to St. Paul, then back to Louisville. After 1917, it was sold, refitted to better serve excursions, and renamed Crescent.

The Emily is a former sternwheeled steamboat built at the Howard Shipyard in 1891. The single-boiler steamer began in ferry service at Kenova, West Virginia, and later operated at Wheeling, West Virginia. Emily was sold three times, starting in 1902. The third buyer was Henderson Ferry Company of Henderson, Kentucky, which renamed it the Dixie Bee Line. It burned in Henderson in 1926. After a rebuild, it ran as the ferry Ohio No. 2. In the 1930s, it was renovated for packet service, and renamed Joe Curtis, and plied the waters near Memphis until it struck ice and sunk on January 25, 1940.

== 20th century ==
Besides the original Jeffersonville, In. location the company had also established Yards in Paducah, Kentucky, Madison, Indiana, Cincinnati, and other locations. Most of them were put up for sale in 1917.

The company faced persistent challenges during the Great Depression. The United States Navy bought the shipyards in 1942 and reorganized it as the Jeffersonville Boat & Machine Company.

During World War II, it built 123 vessels of the type known as "Landing Ship, Tank" (LSTs), 23 submarine chasers, and numerous other craft. Post-war, the shipyards built customized crafts, but specialized in barges and towboats. In 1957, the official name was changed to Jeffboat.

The Jeffboat yard built two nostalgic paddlewheelers during this period. In 1973, it completed Mississippi Queen steamboat, and in 1985, finished the General Jackson showboat.

Production was stopped from 1986 to 1989.

== 21st century ==
A wildcat strike shut down operations during part of 2001.

The Jeffboat yard built a third nostalgic paddlewheeler, the City of Evansville, which was put into service as the Casino Aztar riverboat casino.

A union decertification petition was circulated in 2016, but employees voted 649 to 190 to retain Teamsters Local 89 as their union.

As of 20 June 2015, the 68-acre Jeffboat shipyard is owned by American Commercial Lines Inc. (ACL), a company also based in Jeffersonville, Indiana. Mark Knoy is the CEO. In turn, Platinum Equity owns ACL, the largest inland shipbuilder in the United States, building both river barges and ocean barges.

The company laid off 278 employees in November 2017 due to a lack of production, and it closed permanently on April 23, 2018.

== Ships built ==
Steamships built in the yard include (in alphabetical order):

Name	Origin	Year	Power	Propulsion	tonnage	Length	Beam	Draft	Out of service	Notes
A.D. Allen	Built	1901	Single steam boiler	Sternwheeler		125	23	2.5	1929 or later	Arkansas River
A.M. Halliday	Built	1903	Single boiler steam	Centerwheel		121	59	7.7	1954	Steel, double-hull. Ferry. Dismantled.
A. Baldwin	Built	1905	Dual boiler, steam	Centerwheel		127	58.9	7.5	1971	Steel-hull. Catamaran. Ferry.
Acadia	Built	1860	Steam	Sternwheeler		188	35	7	1863	Burned in the Civil War
Alberta	Built	1876	Steam	Sternwheeler	107	116	25	3.5		White River
Alberta	Built	1880	Steam	Sternwheeler		150	18.5	3.5		Arkansas and White rivers
Alberta No. 3	Built	1884	Steam	Sternwheeler		145	28	3.6		White River
Alex Perry	Built	1891	Dual boiler, steam	Sternwheeler		149.9	18.5	3.5	1896	Lost to fire
Alex. Scott	Built	1842	Steam, six-boilers	Sidewheeler		266	34	8		St. Louis–New Orleans
Algiers	Built	1925	Steam, dual boilers	Sternwheeler		144	55	7.7	After 1958	Dual, steel hull. Catamaran. Ferry. New Orleans.
Aline	Built	1858	Steam	Sternwheeler		125	30	6		New Orleans–Opelousas (1859). Confederate service (1861)
Alma	Built	1900	Triple-boiler, steam	Sternwheeler	311	220	36	5	1861	Missouri River
Alonzo C. Church	Built	1893	Triple-boiler steam	Recess wheel			59	7.7	1954	Steel, double-hull. Ferry. Dismantled.
A. Baldwin	Built	1905	Dual boiler, steam	Centerwheel		172.3	43.3	6.5	1914	Dismantled and converted to wharf boat.
Alonzo Child	Built	1857	Steam, six boilers.	Sidewheeler		236	38	7	After 1863	St. Louis–Omaha. St. Louis–New Orleans.
Alton	Built	1906	Steam	Sidewheeler		241.1	38	7.3	1918	St. Louis–Alton. Excursions. Lost in ice.
America	Built	1898	Triple-boiler, steam	Sternwheeler		200	38	6.5	1926	Ouchita River (1898). Mississippi River (1904).
America	Built	1917	Steam, five boilers	Sidewheeler		285	45	6	1930	Converted wooden hull from Indiana. Lost to fire.
Andrew Christy	Built	1897	Triple-boiler, steam	Sidewheeler		170	48	7.4		Renamed Henry Watterson
Archie P. Green	Built	1873	Steam	Sternwheeler		110	22	3	1880	White River. Sunk near Batesville, Arkansas.
Arkansas City	Built	1882	Steam	Sidewheeler	1,236	273	44	7	1896	Destroyed in tornado
Ashland City	Built	1892	Steam	Sternwheeler		120	20	3.9	After 1900	Nashville–Clarksville (1892). Paducah–Danville.
Assumption	Built	1875	Steam	Sternwheeler		151	35.8	6.5	1895	New Orleans–Thibodeaux (1878). New Orleans–Bayou Lafourche (1880).
B.B.	Built	1899	Steam	Sternwheeler						Ferry at Warsaw and Quincy
B.H. Crooke	Built	1873	Steam	Sternwheeler		151	30	4.5	1880	Evansville–Nashville. Dismantled.
Bayliss Lee	Built	1899	Steam	Sternwheeler		190	38	5.8		Memphis. Paducah–Waterloo. Memphis–Vicksburg.
Bayou City	Built	1859	Steam	Sidewheeler		165	28	5		Houston–Galveston
Belle Lee	Built	1868	Eight boilers, steam	Sidewheeler	1,284	291	2.4	8.4	1876	Refabricated and renamed Mary Bell
Belle Memphis	Built	1866	Steam	Sidewheeler		260	40	7	1980	St.Louis–Memphis. Dismantled.
Belle Memphis	Built	1880	Five boilers, steam	Sidewheeler		267	42	7.5	1897	St. Louis–Memphis. Hit snag near Chester, Illinois.
Belle of Alton	Built		Six boilers, steam	Sidewheeler		229	34.5	6	1871	Alton–St. Louis (1868). New Orleans–Grand Encore (1870). Fire.
Belle of the Bends	Built	1898	Three boilers, steam	Sidewheeler		210	32.6	7.4		Vickburg–Greenville (1898). Sank and raised twice. Renamed Liberty.
Ben Franklin	Built	1869	Four boilers, steam	Sidewheeler		261	37.5	6.1	1881	Cincinnati–Madison. Sank in 1878, but recovered.
Big Sunflower	Built	1869	Steam	Sternwheeler		125	28	4		Vicksburg. Possibly rebuilt as the Jennie Lane.
Birdie Brent	Built	1866	Steam	Recess wheel	109	111	22	3.5	1887	Boonville, MO. Sunk.
Black Locust	Built	1834	Steam			110	25	4.5		Louisville–Jeffersonville. Possibly first or second boat built at Howard.
Black Locust	Built	1847	Steam	Recess wheel.	106				1867	Louisville–Jeffersonville. Ferry. Lost in ice.
Blanks Cornwall	Built	1887	Steam, two boilers.	Sternwheeler		140	29	4.6	1896	Yazoo and Tallahatchie rivers. Lost to snag.
Blue Wing No. 2	Built	1850	Three boilers, steam	Sidewheeler	170	150	60	6.5	1862	Kentucky River. Captured by the CSA and burned.
Blue Wing No. 3	Built	1863	Steam	Sidewheeler	158	150	31	5.7		Kentucky River (1863). New Orleans–Mobile (1866). Louisville (1876).
Bluff City	Built	1896	Four boilers, steam	Sternwheeler		225	42	6	1897	St. Louis–New Orleans. Fire at Chester, IL.
Bob Blanks	Built	1903	Three boilers, steam	Sternwheeler		175	35	5	1912	New Orleans. Fire.
Bonnie Lee	Built	1875	Steam	Sternwheeler		165	30	3.5	1880	New Orleans and Red River. Boiler explosion.

== See also ==
- Howard Steamboat Museum
