= McLean =

MacLean
- Clan Maclean Crest Badge
- Language: Gaelic

Origin
- Meaning: Son of Gillean
- Region of origin: Scotland

Other names
- Alternative spelling: Mclean
- Short form: M'Lean
- Related names: McClean; MacLaine; McLaine; McLain; MacLane; MacClean; MacLain; McLane; McClain; McClaine; MacClain; MacClaine

MacLean, also spelt McLean, is a Scottish Gaelic surname (Mac Gille Eathain, or, Mac Giolla Eóin in Irish Gaelic), Eóin being a Gaelic form of Johannes (John). The clan surname is an Anglicisation of the Scottish Gaelic "Mac Gille Eathain", a patronymic meaning "son of Gillean". Gillean means "the Servant of [Saint] John [the Baptist]"), named for Gilleathain na Tuaidh, known as "Gillian of the Battleaxe", a famous 5th century warrior.

Eachan Reaganach and his brother Lachlan were descended from Gilleathain na Tuaidh, and are the progenitors of the clan. The family grew very powerful throughout the Hebrides and Highlands through alliances with the Catholic Church in Scotland in the 9th century, the MacDonalds in the 13th century, and the MacKays and MacLeods in the 16th century. Other spellings of the name include McClean, MacLaine, McLaine, McLain, MacLane, and many others.

Duart Castle is the seat of Clan MacLean.

== McLean ==
- Aaron McLean (born 1983), English professional footballer
- Adam McLean, Scottish authority on alchemical texts and symbolism
- Agnes McLean (1918–1994), Scottish trade unionist and politician
- AJ McLean (born 1978), American musician and singer
- Al McLean (politician) (born 1937), Canadian politician from Ontario
- Alan McLean (New Zealand cricketer) (1911–2003), New Zealand cricketer
- Alex McLean (born 1975), British musician and software researcher
- Allan Campbell McLean (1922-1989), British writer and political activist
- Allan McLean (Australian politician) (1840–1911), Premier of Victoria 1899–1900, Gippsland's first Federal representative 1901–1906
- Allan McLean (outlaw) (1855–1881), Canadian outlaw and son of Donald McLean, fur trader and explorer
- Aloka McLean (born 1981), Canadian actress
- Andrea McLean, British weather forecaster and television personality
- Angela McLean (biologist), University of Oxford Professor of Mathematical Biology
- Angela McLean, Lieutenant-Governor of Montana (2014–16)
- Archibald McLean (disambiguation), various
- Bethany McLean, business writer for Vanity Fair magazine; formerly Fortune magazine; well known for her work in uncovering the Enron scandal
- Bill McLean (1918–1996), Australian soldier and rugby union player, Wallabies captain
- Bitty McLean, British/Jamaican reggae singer
- Bruce McLean, Scottish artist
- Brian McLean (disambiguation), various
- Daniel McLean (disambiguation), various
- David McLean (disambiguation), various
- David McLean (businessman) (born 1938), founder of the McLean Group of Companies
- Derek McLean (1932–2025), English footballer
- Des McLean, Scottish stand-up comedian, actor and presenter
- Dominique "SonicFox" McLean (born 1991), American esports player
- Don McLean (born 1945), American singer and songwriter
- Donald McLean (fur trader) (1805–1864), Hudson's Bay Company fur trader and explorer, father of outlaw Allan McLean
- Donald McLean (New Zealand politician) (1820–1877), New Zealand politician and government official
- Donald McLean (pastoralist) (1780–1855) pioneer wheat farmer of South Australia
- Doug McLean, Jr. (1912–1961), Australian rugby union and rugby league player
- Doug McLean, Sr. (1880–1947), Australian rugby union and rugby league player
- Edward Beale McLean (1889–1941), American newspaper publisher, Washington Post
- Emily Nelson Ritchie McLean (1859–1916), American civic leader
- Ernest McLean (1926–2012), American R&B guitarist
- Ernie McLean (politician), Canadian politician
- Errol McLean (born 1952), Guyanese cyclist
- Evalyn Walsh McLean (1886–1947), American Washington socialite, wife of Edward Beale McLean
- George F. McLean (1929–2016), American philosopher
- George P. McLean (1857–1932), American politician
- Gloria Hatrick McLean (1918–1994), wife of American actor Jimmy Stewart
- G. S. McLean, founder and long-time past President of Full Gospel Bible Institute (now Eston College), pastor, lecturer and writer
- Ian McLean (1929–1965), Australian rules footballer
- Ian McLean (politician) (born 1934), New Zealand politician
- Jamel McLean (born 1988), American basketball player
- John McLean (1785–1861), American politician and jurist from Ohio
- John McLean (disambiguation), other people named John McLean
- Jackie McLean (1931–2006), American jazz musician
- James McLean (mobster) (1930–1965), American gangster
- James Hamilton McLean (1936–2016), American malacologist
- Jason C. McLean (born 1977), Canadian stage actor
- Jim McLean (1937–2020), Scottish football player and manager
- Jock McLean (1908–1988), Scottish footballer
- John McLean (1785–1861), American politician and jurist from Ohio
- John McLean (Illinois politician) (1791–1830), American politician from Illinois
- Kenny McLean (born 1992), Scottish footballer
- Kirk McLean (born 1966), Canadian professional ice hockey player
- Lachlan McLean (news anchor) (born 1968), American radio broadcaster
- Lachlan McLean (footballer) (born 1996), Australian former soccer player
- Lenny McLean a.k.a. “Guv'nor” (1949–1998), English weightlifter and boxer
- Luke McLean (born 1987), Australian-born Italian rugby union player
- Mable Parker McLean (1922–2012), American academic administrator
- Malcom McLean (1914–2001), inventor of containerized shipping
- McLean (singer) (born 1980), Anthony McLean a British singer previously known as Digga.
- McLean Stevenson (1929–1996), American actor
- Martha McLean, local activist
- Margaret McLean (1845–1923), Australian women's rights advocate
- Matt McLean, American swimmer
- Matt McLean (racing driver), racing driver
- Matty McLean (born 1986), New Zealand television presenter
- Max McLean (born 1953), stage actor, writer, and producer
- Michelle McLean (contemporary), Namibian woman crowned Miss Universe in 1992
- Motto McLean (1925–2019), Canadian ice hockey player
- Nathaniel McLean (1815–1905), Union Army Civil War general
- Nixon McLean (born 1973), West Indian cricketer
- Nolan McLean (born 2001), American baseball player
- Paul McLean (rugby union) (born 1953), Australian rugby union player and rugby union administrator
- Ray (Scooter) McLean, head coach of the Green Bay Packers football team in 1958
- Roderick McLean (19th century), Scottish poet who attempted to assassinate Queen Victoria
- Samuel McLean (U.S. Consul), U.S. Consul for Trinidad de Cuba; 1849–1853, born 1797 in Alexandria, Virginia
- Samuel McLean (congressman), Congressman for Montana, born 1826 in Summit Hill, Pennsylvania
- Samuel McLean (Canadian politician), politician of the Canadian province of Newfoundland and Labrador
- Sara McLean, former Miss Scotland 2011 runner-up and Big Brother 2012 housemate
- Stuart or Stewart McLean, various
- Scott K McLean 1982- Canadian through and through always mischievous but settled down later in life and moved to positive positions cutting all negativity regardless of loss dependable, sarcastic and always willing to help whomever may need
- Tim McLean (1985–2008), Canadian murder victim
- Tommy McLean (born 1947), Scottish football player and manager
- Tre McLean (born 1993), American basketball player in the Israeli Basketball Premier League
- Walter McLean (born 1936), Canadian clergyman and politician from British Columbia, Manitoba, and Ontario
- William B. McLean (1914–1976), United States Navy physicist, conceived and developed the heat-seeking Sidewinder missile
- Wilmer McLean (1814–1882), American farmer in whose house the American Civil war ended in 1865

== MacLean ==
- Alex MacLean (born 1947), American photographic artist
- Alick Maclean (1872–1936), English composer
- Alistair MacLean (1922–1987), Scottish novelist
- Allan Maclean of Torloisk, officer in the British Army responsible for Canada not taken over by rebels during the American War of Independence
- Alejandro Maclean, Spanish film producer and aerobatics pilot
- Alison Maclean, Canadian film director of music videos
- Andrew Dyas MacLean (1896–1971), Canadian naval officer and publisher
- Angus MacLean (1915–2000), Canadian politician, former Premier of Prince Edward Island
- Archer Maclean (contemporary), British computer games programmer
- Archibald MacLean, British Army and Royal Air Force officer
- Billy Joe MacLean (1936–2025), Canadian politician
- Bonnie MacLean, American artist
- Brett MacLean (born 1988), Canadian ice hockey player
- Bryan MacLean (1946–1998), American singer, guitarist and songwriter
- Calum Maclean (folklorist) (1915–1960), Scottish folklorist, collector, ethnographer and author
- Charles Hector Fitzroy Maclean of Duart, Baron Maclean (1916–1990), Scottish nobleman, Lord Chamberlain to Queen Elizabeth II 1971–1984
- Craig MacLean (born 1971), Scottish track cyclist
- Danielle MacLean (fl.1990s–present), Australian filmmaker
- David Maclean (born 1953), English politician from Penrith and The Border
- Don Maclean (comedian) (born 1944), British comedian and television host
- Don MacLean (basketball) (born 1970), American basketball player and broadcaster
- Sir Donald Maclean (MP, died 1932) (1864–1932), English politician
- Donald Maclean (spy) (1913–1983), British intelligence agent and spy for the Soviet Union during WWII
- Doug MacLean (born 1954), Canadian sportscaster and former head coach and general manager
- Dougie MacLean (born 1954), Scottish singer-songwriter
- Douglas MacLean (1890–1967), American silent motion picture actor, producer, and writer
- Edwin L. MacLean (1890–1968), American politician and lawyer
- Eileen MacLean (1949–1996), American educator and politician
- Every Maclean (fl. 1870s), member of the New Zealand Legislative Council
- Sir Ewen Maclean, professor of Obstetrics and Gynaecology
- Sir Fitzroy Maclean, 1st Baronet (1911–1996), Scottish diplomat, adventurer, writer, and politician
- Sir George Maclean, (1795–1861), Commissary General in the British Army.
- George Maclean (1801–1847), Governor of Gold Coast
- Harry Aubrey de Maclean (1848–1920), (Kaïd, General Sir), soldier and instructor to the Moroccan army
- Hector MacLean (disambiguation)
- Hector Lachlan Stewart MacLean (1871–1897), Scottish recipient of the Victoria Cross
- James Mackenzie Maclean (1835–1906), Welsh politician
- Jill MacLean (born 1941), English-Canadian author
- John Duncan MacLean (1873–1948), Canadian politician, Premier of British Columbia 1927–1928
- John Maclean MA (1879–1923), Scottish politician
- John Frederick MacLean (1921–1973) American sports broadcaster
- John MacLean (ice hockey) (born 1964), Canadian professional ice hockey player
- John Norman Maclean (contemporary), American author
- The Juan MacLean, American electronic musician
- Karon MacLean, American and Canadian computer scientist and mechanical engineer
- Katherine MacLean (1925–2019), American science fiction author
- Kenny MacLean (1956–2008), Scottish-Canadian musician
- Kirsty Maclean (born 2005), Scottish footballer
- Kyle MacLean (born 1999), American ice hockey player
- Loudoun MacLean (1893–?), British World War I flying ace
- Malcolm Alexander MacLean (1842–1895), Canadian politician, Mayor of Vancouver, BC 1886–1887
- MacLean & MacLean, a comedy/parody duo in Canada
- Melinda MacLean (born 1946), Canadian politician
- Nancy MacLean (born 1959), American historian
- Natalie MacLean, Canadian wine writer
- Neil Maclean (politician) (1875–1953), Scottish politician
- Norman Maclean (1902–1990), American novelist and academic
- Norman Hector Mackinnon Maclean (Tormod MacGill-Eain) (1936–2017), Scottish Gaelic comedian, novelist, poet, musician and broadcaster.
- Paul MacLean (ice hockey) (born 1958), Canadian ice hockey player
- Paul D. MacLean (1913–2007), American physician and brain scientist
- Rachel Maclean, a Scottish multi-media artist
- Rachel Maclean (born 1965), UK politician
- Ranald MacLean (born 1938), Scottish judge
- Robert MacLean (born 1970), American Air Force, Border Patrol, and Federal Air Marshal Service veteran
- Rob MacLean (born 1958), Scottish television presenter, football commentator and sports writer
- Ronald MacLean Abaroa (born 1949), Bolivian politician
- Ron MacLean (born 1960), Canadian sportscaster
- Rory MacLean (born 1954), Canadian and British author
- Sarah Jean Munro Maclean (1873–1952), Canadian painter
- Sorley MacLean (1911–1996), Scottish Scots Gaelic poet
- Steven MacLean (disambiguation), various
  - Steven MacLean (astronaut) (born 1954), Canadian astronaut
  - Steve MacLean (footballer) (born 1982), retired Scottish footballer and current first team coach at St. Johnstone
- Tara MacLean (born 1973), Canadian singer and songwriter
- Veronica Maclean (1920–2005), British food writer and hotelier
- Vince MacLean (born 1944), Canadian politician and former Speaker of the Nova Scotia House of Assembly
- William Q. MacLean Jr. (1934–2026), American politician

== McClean ==
- James McClean (born 1989), Irish footballer

== Maclean Feudal Barons in Scotland ==
- The Honorable Sir Lachlan Maclean of Duart Baron of Duart
- Sir Charles Edward Maclean of Dunconnel Bt, 2nd Baronet of Strachur and Glensluain, Baron Strachur, and 16th Hereditary Keeper and Captain of Dunconnel in the Isles of The Sea
- Lorne Gillean Ian Mclaine of Lochbuie Baron of Moy
- Malcolm Fraser Maclean of Kingairloch Baron of Kingairloch
- Kenneth Lee MacLean Baron of Denboig
- David Ian Mclean Baron of Preston

== Maclean Life Peers ==
- Charles Maclean, Baron Maclean
- David Maclean, Baron Blencathra

== Fictional characters ==
- Chris McLean, host of the Total Drama series
- Lord Maclean, a character in "The Revenge of Hamish", a poem by Sidney Lanier
- Tristan McLean, the mortal father of Piper McLean created by Rick Riordan.
- Will McLean, narrator in the 1980 novel The Lords of Discipline by Pat Conroy
- Piper McLean, a character in Rick Riordan's The Heroes of Olympus series. She is a demigod daughter of Aphrodite and Tristan McLean.
- Lucy MacLean, a protagonist of the Fallout TV series, where she portrays a vault dweller in search of her father Hank MacLean.
- Hank MacLean, a character in the Fallout TV Series, Lucy MacLean's father and the Overseer of Vault 33.

== See also ==
- Clan Maclean
- Maclean baronets
- John McClane, fictional character
- MacLaine surnames
- McLaine surnames
- McLain surnames
- MacLane surnames
