= McLanahan =

McLanahan, McClanahan or McLanachan is a surname. Notable people with the surname include:

- Eugene McLanahan Wilson (1833–1890), Representative from Minnesota
- James Xavier McLanahan (1809–1861), Democratic member of the U.S. House of Representatives from Pennsylvania
- Patrick McLanahan, fictional aviator created by author Dale Brown
- Rue McClanahan (1934–2010), American actress, known for roles on television
- Sara McLanahan, American sociologist
- Tenant McLanahan (1820–1848), officer in the United States Navy during the Mexican–American War
- Ward McLanahan (1883–1974), American track and field athlete who competed in the 1904 Summer Olympics
- Willie McLanachan (born 1947), Scottish footballer
- USS McLanahan (DD-264), Clemson-class destroyer in the United States Navy
- USS McLanahan (DD-615), Benson-class destroyer in the United States Navy during World War II
- Kate McLanachan (born 1969)

British Author

== See also ==
- McLain (disambiguation)
- McLane (disambiguation)
- McLean (disambiguation)
