= McLean (disambiguation) =

McLean or Maclean is a surname.

McLean or Maclean may also refer to:

== Places ==
=== Australia ===
- Maclean, New South Wales
- Maclean, Queensland (disambiguation)
  - North Maclean, Queensland
  - South Maclean, Queensland
- Maclean Island, Tasmania

=== Canada ===
- McLean, Saskatchewan
- McLean Island (Nunavut)

=== United States ===
- McLean, Illinois
- McLean, Nebraska
- McLean, Ohio
- McLean, Texas
- McLean, Virginia
  - McLean (WMATA station), a Washington Metro station in McLean
- McLean, West Virginia
- McLean County (disambiguation)

== Other uses ==
- Matty McLean, New Zealand TV presenter
- McLean Group of Companies, a North American real estate and film company
- Clan Maclean, Scottish clan
- McLean Hospital, psychiatric hospital, in Belmont, Massachusetts, USA
- McLean Deluxe, low fat hamburger once sold by McDonald's restaurants
- Maclean's, is Canada's only national weekly current affairs magazine
- McLean v. Arkansas, US Supreme Court case regarding church-state separation
- McLean High School, a school in McLean, Virginia
- Macleans (toothpaste), a brand of toothpaste distributed by GlaxoSmithKline
- McLean "Taco" Dowler (born 2003), American football player

== See also ==
- Clan Maclean
- McLean school
- McClean (disambiguation)
- McClain (disambiguation)
- Macklin (disambiguation)
- McLane (disambiguation)
