= McClean =

McClean is an Irish surname. Notable people with the surname include:

- Adam McClean (born c. 1989), British journalist and broadcaster
- Andrew McClean, Irish Gaelic footballer
- Bernie Wright McClean (born 1979), Costa Rican professional footballer
- Christian McClean (born 1963), English former professional footballer
- Francis McClean (1876–1955), pioneer aviator
- Frank McClean (1837–1904), astronomer and pioneer in spectrography
- James McClean (born 1989), Irish footballer playing for West Bromwich Albion
- Joe McClean (rugby league) (born 1989), rugby league footballer who has played in the 2010s
- John Gerard McClean (1914–1978), Bishop of Middlesbrough, 1967–78
- John Robinson McClean (1813–1873), British civil engineer and Liberal Party politician
- Mike McClean, British television presenter and actor
- Moses McClean (1804–1870), Democratic member of the U.S. House of Representatives from Pennsylvania
- Raymond McClean (1932–2011), Irish nationalist politician
- Sally McClean, Northern Irish statistician, computer scientist, and operations researcher
- Sheila McClean (1932–2016), Irish painter
- Shilo McClean, writer, researcher, public speaker, consultant
- Stacey McClean (born 1989), English singer and member of UK Pop band S Club
- Yolanda McClean, Canadian library technician and trade unionist

== See also ==
- Clan Maclean
- McClain (disambiguation)
- McClean Lake mine, a uranium mine in Saskatchewan, Canada
- McClean telescope, at the South African Astronomical Observatory
- MacLaine
- McLean (disambiguation)
- McLane (disambiguation)
- Macklin (disambiguation)
