= MacLane =

MacLane is a surname. Notable people with the surname include:

- Angus MacLane, American animator, screenwriter, and voice actor
- Barton MacLane (1902–1969), American actor, playwright and screenwriter
- Evan MacLane (born 1982), American baseball player
- Mary MacLane (1881–1929), Canadian-born American writer
- Saunders Mac Lane (1909–2005), American mathematician

== See also ==
- John McClane, fictional character
- MacLaine surnames
- McLaine surnames
- McLain surnames
- McLane
