= USS McLanahan =

USS McLanahan may refer to the following ships of the United States Navy:

- USS McLanahan (DD-264), a Clemson-class destroyer commissioned in 1919 and transferred to the Royal Navy in 1940 where she served as HMS Bradford (H72)
- USS McLanahan (DD-615), a Benson-class destroyer commissioned in 1942 and decommissioned in 1946
