= Samuel McLean =

Samuel McLean may refer to:

- Samuel McLean (U.S. Consul) (1797–1881), American diplomat
- Samuel McLean (Montana politician) (1826–1877), American politician from Montana
