= David McLean =

David or Dave, McLean or Maclean may refer to:

- David McLean (actor) (1922–1995), American film and television actor
- David McLean (footballer, born 1884) (1884–1951), Scottish football player (Celtic, Ayr United) and manager (East Fife, Bristol Rovers, Heart of Midlothian)
- David McLean (footballer, born 1890) (1890–1967), Scottish international football player
- David McLean (footballer, born 1957), English footballer, played for Darlington
- David McLean (rugby league) (born 1977), Australian rugby league player
- David McLean (historian), British historian
- David McLean (umpire), Scottish cricket umpire
- David G. A. McLean (1938–2025), Canadian lawyer and businessman; chairman of the Canadian National Railway Company
- David Maclean, Baron Blencathra (born 1953), British politician, member of parliament for Penrith and The Border
- David Stuart MacLean, American writer
- David Maclean, drummer and producer for the British band Django Django
- David McLean, farmer who captured in 1941 Rudolf Hess, leading member of the Nazi Party in Nazi Germany
- Big Dave McLean (born 1952), Canadian blues guitarist, harmonicist, singer and songwriter
- Dave Maclean (1944–2023), Brazilian singer-songwriter
- Dave McLean (talent manager), talent manager
