= Wacklin =

Wacklin is a surname. Notable people with the surname include:

- Isak Wacklin (1720–1758), Finnish painter
- Sara Wacklin (1790–1846), Swedish-speaking Finnish educator and writer

== See also ==
- Macklin (surname)
