= McLane =

McLane is a surname. Notable people with the surname include:

- Allen McLane (1746–1829), officer in the Continental Army during the American Revolution
- Ann McLane Kuster (born 1956), American lawyer and author
- David McLane, Las Vegas promoter
- David McLane (merchant) (ca. 1767–1797), a merchant from Providence, RI
- Derek McLane (born 1958), English born American set designer
- Drayton McLane, Jr. (born 1936), American entrepreneur
- Ed McLane (1881–1975), American baseball player
- Eddie McLane (1899–1980), American sports coach
- George R. McLane (1819–1855), American physician and politician, grandson of Allen McLane
- Harvey McLane, Canadian provincial politician
- Jimmy McLane (1930–2020), former United States swimmer
- John McLane (1852–1911), American furniture maker and politician
- Kim McLane Wardlaw (born 1954), U.S. federal judge in California
- Louis McLane (1786–1857), American lawyer and politician, son of Allen McLane
- Malcolm McLane (1924-2008), American lawyer, businessman, and politician
- M. Jean McLane (1878–1964), American portraitist
- Patrick McLane (1875–1946), American politician
- Ralph McLane (1907–1951), American clarinetist
- Robert Milligan McLane (1815–1898), American politician, military officer, and diplomat
- S. Brooks McLane, American physicist
- Susan McLane (1929-2005), American politician
- Val McLane (born 1943), English actress, scriptwriter and director
- William McLane (Pennsylvania politician), 20th century American politician
- William McLane (Washington state), 19th century American politician

== Other ==
- McLane Company, a supply chain services company, founded by Drayton McLane, Jr., now owned by Berkshire Hathaway
- McLane Advanced Technologies, founded by Drayton McLane, Jr.
- Drayton McLane Baseball Stadium at John H. Kobs Field
- John McClane, character portrayed by Bruce Willis in the Die Hard movies
- USRC Louis McLane later USRC Delaware
- USRC McLane (1832) revenue cutter
- USRC McLane (1845) revenue cutter
- Governor R. M. McLane (steamboat)
- McLane Stadium
- McLane–Ocampo Treaty
- General McLane High School in Erie County, Pennsylvania
  - General McLane School District
- McLane High School in Fresno, California

== See also ==
- MacLane
- MacLaine
- Maclean
- McClain (disambiguation)
- McClean (disambiguation)
