= George MacLean =

George MacLean may refer to:

- George Edwin MacLean, president of the University of Iowa
- George Ian MacLean, gold commissioner of Yukon

== See also ==
- George Maclean, governor of Gold Coast
- Sir George Maclean (commissary general), British Army officer
