= Alan Scott (RAF officer) =

New Zealand RAF officer (1883–1922)

Alan John Lance Scott
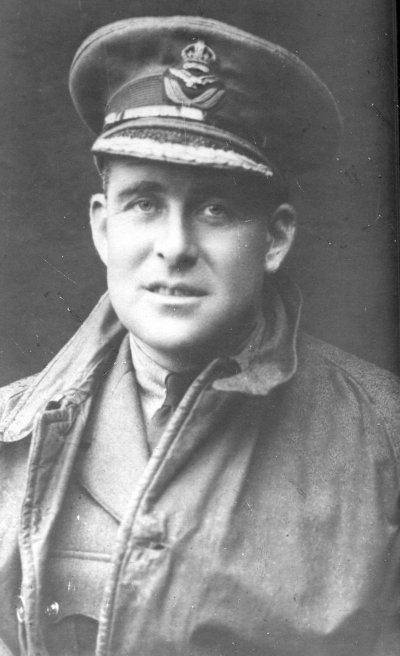
- Scott in Royal Air Force uniform
- Born: 29 June 1883; Christchurch, New Zealand
- Died: 16 January 1922 (aged 38); London, England
- Military career
- Allegiance: United Kingdom
- Branch: British Army; Royal Air Force
- Rank: Group Captain
- Nickname: Jack
- Commands: Central Flying School (1917–1918); No. 60 Squadron RFC (1917)
- Conflicts: First World War
- Awards: Companion of the Order of the Bath; Military Cross; Air Force Cross

Group Captain Alan John Lance Scott, CB, MC, AFC (29 June 1883 – 16 January 1922) was an officer in the Royal Flying Corps and Royal Air Force during the First World War and the following years.

== Early life ==
Scott was born in Christchurch, New Zealand, on 29 June 1883, but moved to in England where he attended Oxford University, from which he graduated with a law degree. He practiced as a barrister in London, and was acquainted with Lord Birkenhead and Winston Churchill.

== First World War ==
He was originally an officer in the British Army's Sussex Yeomanry, later transferring to the Royal Flying Corps. Scott never became a very good pilot; in fact, in training, he crashed and broke both legs. He continued training on canes, and had to be assisted into the cockpit. However, he was a pugnacious dogfighter whose solo missions sometimes got him into trouble. For instance, on 28 May 1917, he survived being Leutnant Karl Allmenröder's 21st victory.

In July 1917 Scott was awarded the Military Cross:

Capt. (temp Maj.) Alan John Lance Scott Yeo., and R.F.C. For conspicuous gallantry and devotion to duty. He has on several occasions attacked and destroyed enemy aircraft and taken successful photographs under heavy fire. He has constantly shown the greatest courage in attacking numerous hostile machines single-handed, during which on two occasions his own machine was considerably damaged. His great coolness, dash, and resource have set an excellent example to his squadron.

Scott was a flight commander on No. 43 Squadron RFC until 10 March 1917 when he took up command of No. 60 Squadron RFC. He remained as No. 60 Squadron's commander until 11 July 1917, the day after he was wounded in action.

From some time in 1917 to 1918, Scott was the Commandant of the Central Flying School. Notably, Scott acted as Winston Churchill's flying instructor.

== Later life ==
In 1920, Scott's book "Sixty Squadron RAF: A history of the squadron from its formation" was published. Scott died on 16 January 1922 in London, England aged 38.

Military offices
Preceded by Archibald MacLean	Commandant of the Central Flying School; 1917–1918	Succeeded by Patrick Playfair
