= Archibald McLean =

Archibald McLean may refer to:

- Archibald McLean (d. 1830), New Brunswick political figure
- Archibald McLean (Baptist) (1733–1812), Scottish minister
- Archibald McLean (judge) (1791–1865), judge and political figure in Upper Canada
- Archibald J. McLean (1860–1933), cattleman and politician from Alberta, Canada
- Archibald Lang McLean (1885–1922), Australian doctor
- Archie McLean (footballer) (1894–1971), football player
- Archie McLean (ice hockey) (1889–1960), Canadian professional ice hockey player

== See also ==
- Archibald MacLean (1883–1970), officer in the Royal Scots, Royal Flying Corps and Royal Air Force
