= SS Papoose =

Oil tanker built in 1921

Coordinates: 34°17′N 76°39′W

History

Dutch East IndiesUnited States
- Name: Silvanus (1921–1926); Papoose (1927–1942)
- Owner: Nederlandsch-Indische Tankstoomboot Maatschappij (1921-1926); Petroleum Navigation Co. (1927–1942)
- Builder: Southwestern Shipbuilding & Drydock Co., San Pedro
- Cost: $2,000,000
- Yard number: 25
- Laid down: 20 October 1920
- Launched: 30 June 1921
- Sponsored by: Mrs. Earl L. Miller
- Commissioned: 10 August 1921
- Maiden voyage: 31 August 1921
- Homeport: s-Gravenhage (1921–1926); Houston (1927–1942)
- Identification: US Official Number 226583; Code letters PSDC (1921–1926); Code letters MGLT (1927–1933); Code letters WNBS (1934–1942)
- Fate: Sunk, 19 March 1942

General characteristics
- Type: Tanker
- Tonnage: 5,789 GRT (1921–1926); 3,378 NRT (1921–1926); 5,939 GRT (1927–1942); 3,636 NRT (1927–1942); 8,353 DWT
- Length: 412.0 ft (125.6 m)
- Beam: 53.3 ft (16.2 m)
- Depth: 31.0 ft (9.4 m)
- Installed power: 2,800 ihp, 556 Nhp
- Propulsion: Hooven, Owens & Rentschler 3-cylinder triple expansion
- Speed: 11 knots (20 km/h; 13 mph)

Silvanus was a steam tanker built in 1920–1921 by the Southwestern Shipbuilding & Drydock Company of San Pedro for the Anglo-Saxon Petroleum Company with the intention of transporting oil and petroleum products between Dutch East Indies and various destinations in Europe and the Far East. The tanker was employed in this capacity through the first part of 1926. In April 1926 Silvanus collided with the tanker Thomas H. Wheeler in the Mississippi River, resulting in the explosion and death of 26 seamen. Silvanus was declared a total loss and sold at auction to the newly formed Petroleum Navigation Company of Texas. The tanker was rebuilt and renamed Papoose and started operating in March 1927. In March 1942, she was attacked by German U-boat U-124 off the coast of North Carolina. The ship drifted for several days and eventually sank in 200 feet (61 m) of water off Oregon Inlet.

== Design and construction ==
In 1920 Anglo-Saxon Petroleum Co., a wholly owned subsidiary of the Royal Dutch Shell Company, decided to expand their oil carrying fleet by placing orders with a number of United States West Coast shipyards. In August 1920 it was reported that one such order for three tankers of approximately 8,400 deadweight tonnage each was entered with the Southwestern Shipbuilding & Drydock Co.

Silvanus was the second of these three vessels (the other two being SS Scopas and SS Semiramis), and had her keel laid at the shipbuilder's yard on 20 October 1920, and launched on 30 June 1921, with Mrs. Earl L. Miller, wife of the Pacific coast manager of the Royal Dutch Shell, being the sponsor. The tanker was built on the Isherwood principle of longitudinal framing providing extra strength to the body of the vessel. The vessel was built according to blueprints provided by the Anglo-Saxon Petroleum Co., had two decks and was constructed on the three-island principle. The tanker had a cargo pump room located amidships and was able to carry up to 60,000 barrels of oil. The vessel had her machinery situated aft, was equipped with wireless apparatus and had electric lights installed along the decks.

As built, the ship was 412.0 feet (125.6 m) long (between perpendiculars) and 53.3 feet (16.2 m) abeam, and had a depth of 31.2 feet (9.5 m). Silvanus was assessed at 5,789 GRT and 3,378 NRT and had deadweight tonnage of approximately 8,400. The vessel had a steel hull and a single 556 nhp triple-expansion steam engine, with cylinders of 27-inch (69 cm), 45-inch (110 cm) and 74-inch (190 cm) diameter with a 48-inch (120 cm) stroke, that drove a single screw propeller, and moved the ship at up to 11 knots (13 mph; 20 km/h). The steam for the engine was supplied by three single-ended Scotch marine boilers fitted for oil fuel.

After successful completion of sea trials on 9 August, the tanker was delivered to Dutch Shell representatives the next day and put under control of Nederlandsch-Indische Tankstoomboot Maatschappij, a wholly owned subsidiary of the Royal Dutch Shell, which controlled and operated the company's vessels in the East Indies.

== Operational history ==
After the tanker was delivered, she remained in San Pedro for the next two weeks, before sailing out for loading at San Francisco. She reached her destination on 28 August, and immediately proceeded to Martinez to load full cargo of kerosene for delivery to China. Upon undergoing her final inspection, and loading the cargo, Silvanus departed San Francisco on 31 August, bound for Shanghai. After an uneventful voyage, the ship reached Tianjin on 1 October. The tanker then proceeded to visit ports of Shanghai, Singapore and Balikpapan, and returned to San Francisco on 12 December via Victoria and Seattle, thus successfully completing her maiden voyage. She then sailed from San Francisco on 24 December for Shanghai to commence her service in East Asia. The tanker reached her destination at the end of January and immediately proceeded to Australia via Singapore, arriving at Melbourne on 10 March 1922. After discharging her cargo, the tanker departed on 14 March for Balikpapan, the major oil producing center in the Dutch East Indies. From there Silvanus departed with a full cargo of oil on 4 April, and arrived at Thames Haven on 13 May. Subsequently, Silvanus spent the remainder of 1922 transporting fuel oil between Abadan and Suez, before departing in early January 1923 back to Singapore and Balikpapan. From there, she again sailed for Australia, arriving at Adelaide on 21 February 1923 with a cargo of oil, kerosene and motor spirit. The ship then went back to Balikpapan and from there sailed out for Thames Haven, reaching it on 7 May. She subsequently sailed out for Port Arthur where she loaded oil and departed on 3 June bound for Indian ports. The tanker reached Bombay on 15 July via the Suez Canal.
