= Macklin =

Macklin may refer to:

Places

- Macklin, Saskatchewan, a town in Canada

People

- Macklin (surname)
- Macklin Celebrini (born 2006), Canadian ice hockey player
- Macklin McCall, Canadian politician

== See also ==
- Maclean
