= Bethlehem Shipbuilding San Pedro =

Shipyard in San Pedro, California, United States

Coordinates: 33.72996°N 118.26993°W

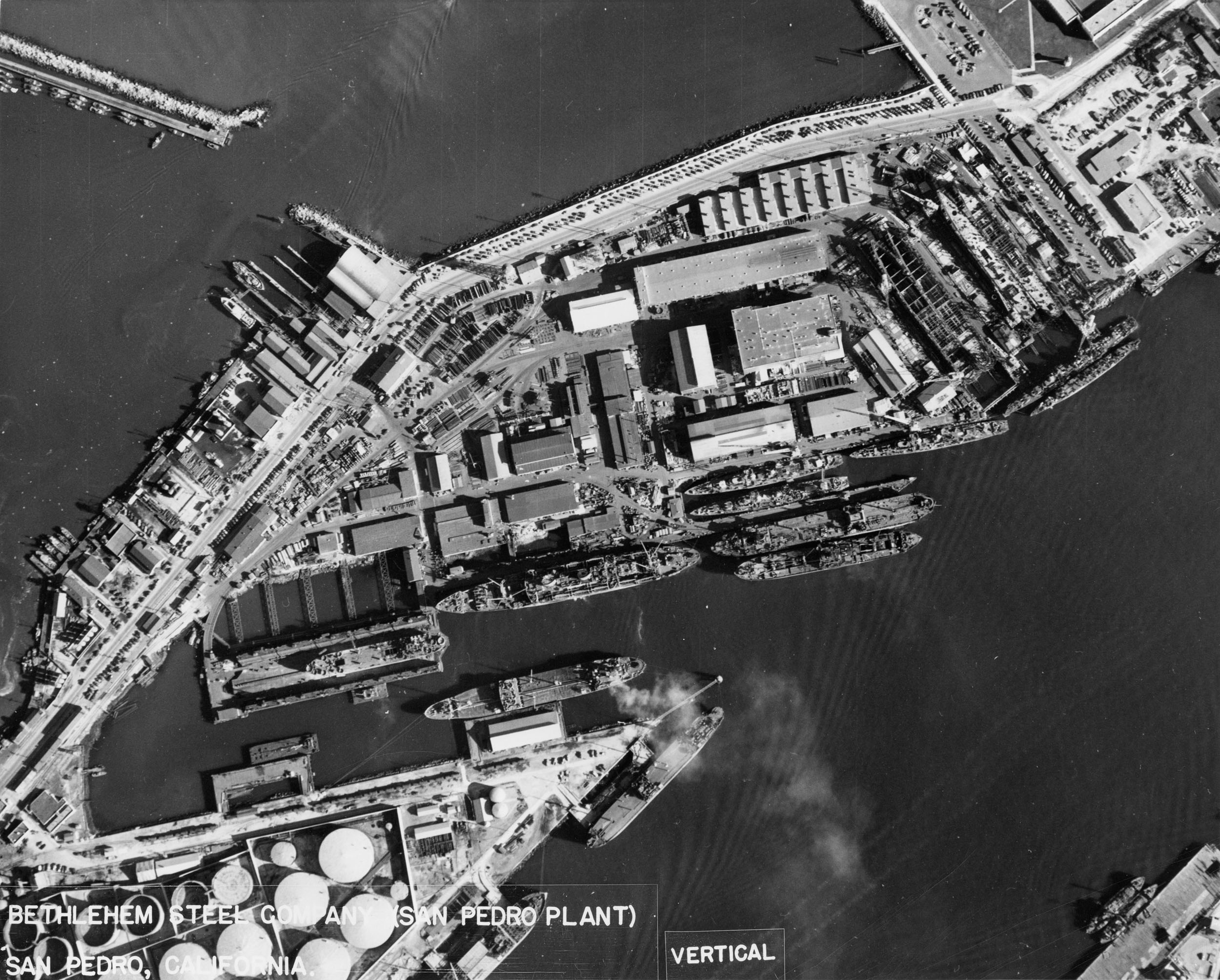
Bethlehem Shipbuilding San Pedro yard in 1944

Bethlehem Shipbuilding San Pedro was a major shipbuilding company on Terminal Island in San Pedro, California, owned by Bethlehem Shipbuilding Corporation. To support the World War II demand for ships, Bethlehem Shipbuilding San Pedro built US Navy Destroyers and, after the war, tugboats. The yard became involved in World War II production in the early shipbuilding expansions initiated by the Two-Ocean Navy Act of July 1940. At its peak during the war about 6,000 worked at the yard.

Bethlehem Shipbuilding San Pedro shipyard was opened in 1918 as Southwestern Shipbuilding by Western Pipe & Steel. Western Pipe & Steel sold the shipyard to Bethlehem Shipbuilding Corporation in 1925. Shipbuilding ended after World War II in 1946. In 1983 the shipyard was sold to Southwest Marine. In 1997 Southwest Marine operated four shipyards, which they sold to the Carlyle Group. Carlyle Group renamed the shipyard US Marine Repair. In 2002 US Marine Repair sold all six of its yards to United Defense Industries. In 2005 it was sold to BAE Systems, but the yard was not used and it is now part of the Port of Los Angeles. The shipyard was located at 1047 South Seaside Ave, San Pedro.

== World War II ==
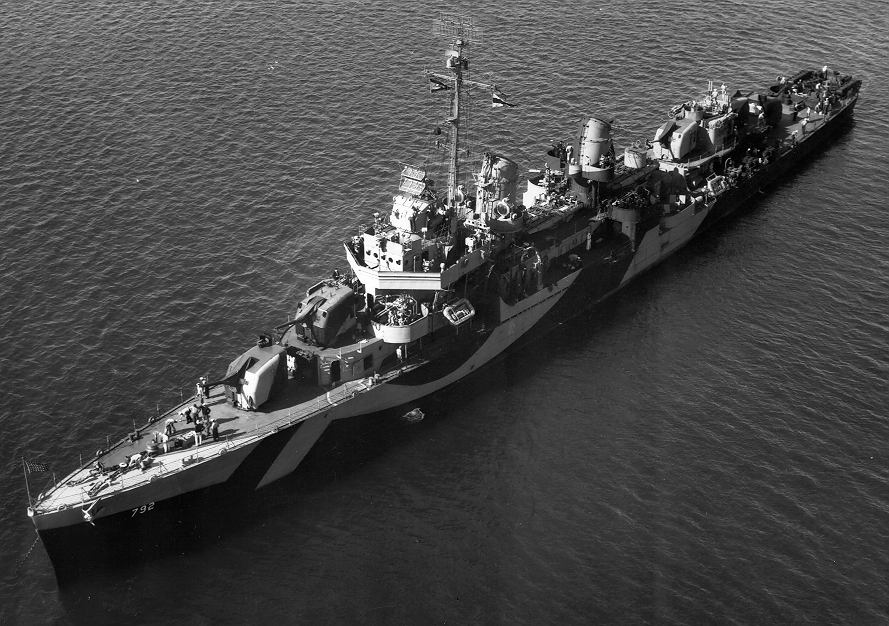
Fletcher-class destroyer, (DD-792) Callaghan sunk by kamikazes off Okinawa on July 28, 1945

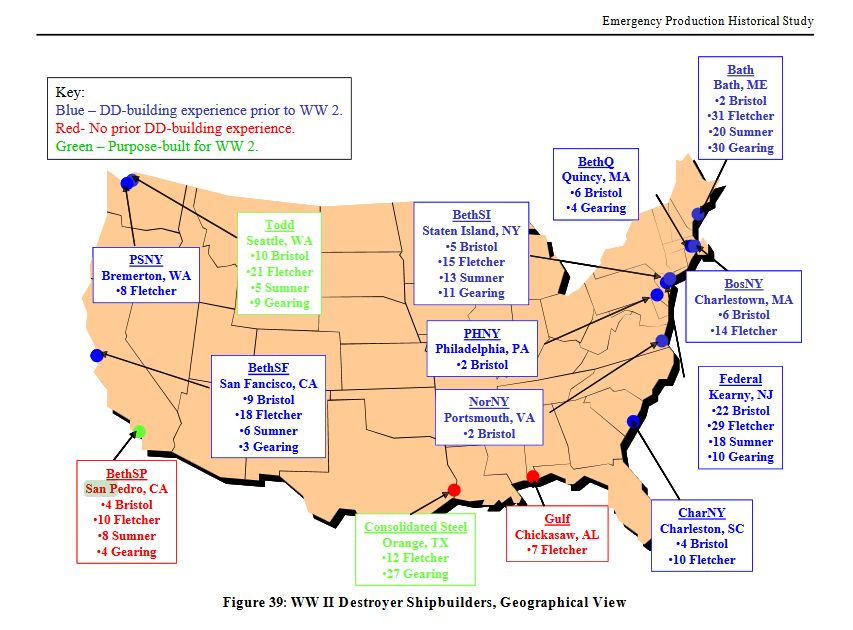
World War II Destroyer Shipbuilders map from Department of Defense (DoD)

Bethlehem Shipbuilding San Pedro destroyers built from 1942 to 1945:

- 26 of 415 destroyers
  - 4 of 30 Benson-class
    - Kendrick (DD-612) ... McLanahan (DD-615)
  - 10 of 175 Fletcher-class
    - Boyd (DD-544) ... Cowell (DD-547)
    - Hopewell (DD-681), Porterfield (DD-682)
    - Callaghan (DD-792) ... USS Preston (DD-795)
  - 5 of 58 Allen M. Sumner-class
    - Lowry (DD-770)
    - Hugh W. Hadley (DD-774) ... James C. Owens (DD-776)
    - Bristol (DD-857)
  - 3 of 12 Robert H. Smith-class destroyer minelayers
    - Lindsey (DD-771) ... Aaron Ward (DD-773)
  - 4 of 98 Gearing-class
    - Fred T. Berry (DD-858) ... Harwood (DD-861)
- 4 Hisada-class harbor tugs
  - USS Acoma (YTB-701)
  - YT Arawak YTM-702, removed from US Navy in December 1985
  - YT Canarsee, US Navy sold in 1975
  - YT Moratok, US Navy sold in 1985.

== Southwestern Shipbuilding ==
Southwestern was the second largest of three steel shipyards in the Ports of Los Angeles and Long Beach active during the World War I shipbuilding boom, responsible for 28% of the tonnage built there for the United States Shipping Board.

Many of the ships were Design 1019 ships built under the USSB's Emergency Fleet Corporation (EFC) contacts. Ships built:

Ship name	Type	Tons	Delivered	Notes
West Carnifax	Cargo	6,150	Jan-19	Renamed to Exford in 1928, Pan Royal in 1930, in collision and lost in 1943
West Caruth	Cargo	6,150	Feb-19	Renamed to Exmoor in 1923, Antonio Tripcovich in 1924, Seisho Maru in 1928, torpedoed and lost in 1944
West Catanace	Cargo	6,150	Mar-19	Renamed to Atlantic in 1923, Theodore in 1947, Archon in 1951, scrapped in 1952
West Sequana	Cargo	6,150	Apr-19	Renamed to Golden Cloud in 1928, Waimea in 1938, Marcar in 1950, Carmar in 1952, Madelaine in 1955, scrapped in 1958
West Cavanal	Cargo	6,150	Jun-19	Renamed to Edgar Bowling in 1923, Texmar in 1927, Irkutsk in 1945, scrapped in 1966
West Cawthon	Cargo	6,150	Jul-19	Renamed to Empire Bison in 1940, torpedoed and lost in 1940
West Cayote	Cargo	6,150	Aug-19	Renamed to Washington in 1928, bombed and lost in 1942
West Chetac	Cargo	6,150	Jul-19	Torpedoed and lost in 1942
West Inskip	Cargo	6,000	Sep-19	Renamed to Charcas in 1926, Carreta in 1940, Parita Sun in 1947, scrapped in 1953
West Chicopee	Cargo	6,000	Dec-19	Renamed Bakersfield, renamed to Chagres in 1941, Mirafjord in 1947, San Salvatore in 1950, scrapped in 1953
West Neris	Cargo	6,000	Dec-19	Renamed to Irish Oak in 1941, torpedoed and lost in 1943
West Niger	Cargo	6,000	Jan-20	Renamed to Nevada in 1938, wrecked in 1932
West Nilus	Cargo	5,650	Mar-20	Sunk as breakwater at Normandy in 1944
West Niveria	Cargo	5,650	Apr-20	Renamed to Golden Coast in 1928, Delawarean in 1937, Empire Hawksbill in 1940, torpedoed and lost in 1942
West Nomentum	Cargo	5,650	May-20	Renamed to Pennsylvania in 1928, Pan in 1947, Tanar in 1949, in collision and sank in 1959
West Norranus	Cargo	5,650	Jun-20	Renamed to Pacific Pine in 1926, Maine in 1937, Lvov in 1945, Istra in 1951, scrapped in 1958
West Notus	Cargo	5,650	Jul-20	Shelled and scuttled in 1942
West Numidia	Tanker	5,650	Aug-20	Renamed Hollywood, wrecked and lost in 1945
Mary Luckenbach	Cargo	8,600	Dec-20	Renamed to C. B. Watson in 1936, Indiana in 1947, Al Horreya in 1954, Mansoura in 1957, scrapped in 1963
	Barge	165	Apr-20	
SS Montabello	Tanker	8,272	Mar-21	Torpedoed and lost in 1941
La Placentia	Tanker	8,272	Apr-21	Scrapped in 1948
La Purisima	Tanker	8,272	Oct-21	Renamed to Taganrog in 1943, Octorara in 1944, La Purisima in 1946, scrapped in 1947
Scopas	Tanker	5,900	Jul-21	Scrapped in 1939
Silvanus	Tanker	5,900	Aug-21	Renamed to SS Papoose in 1926 (ON 226583), torpedoed and lost in 1942
Semiramis	Tanker	5,900	Sep-21	scuttled in 1942, raised and renamed to Kyoko Maru in 1943, torpedoed and lost in 1943

== See also ==
- California during World War II
- Maritime history of California
