= McLean school =

McLean school or MacLean school or variant may refer to:

- McLean School of Maryland, K-12 coed school in Potomac, Maryland, USA
- McLean High School, high school in McLean, Virginia, USA
- McLean High School (Texas), a.k.a. "McLean School", high school in McLean, Texas, USA
- McLean Independent School District, school board in McLean, Texas, USA
- McLean Primary School, primary school in Dunfermline, Fife, Scotland
- MacLean Elementary School, elementary school in British Columbia, Canada
- Macleans Primary School, primary school in Bucklands Beach, Auckland, New Zealand
- Macleans College, coed secondary school in Bucklands Beach, Auckland, New Zealand

== See also ==
- McLean (disambiguation)
