= 1943 Rolls-Royce strike =

Strike action over women's pay

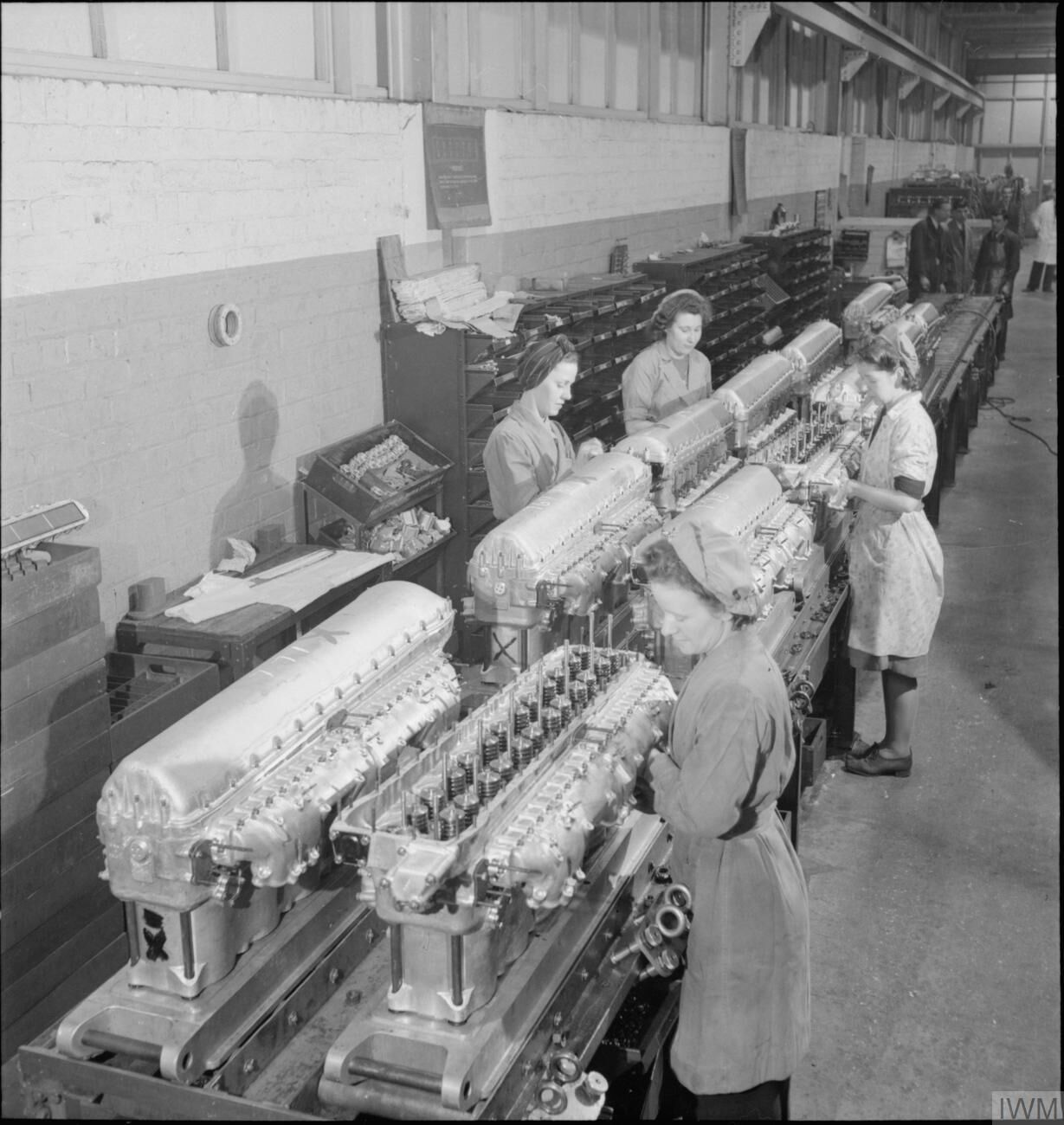
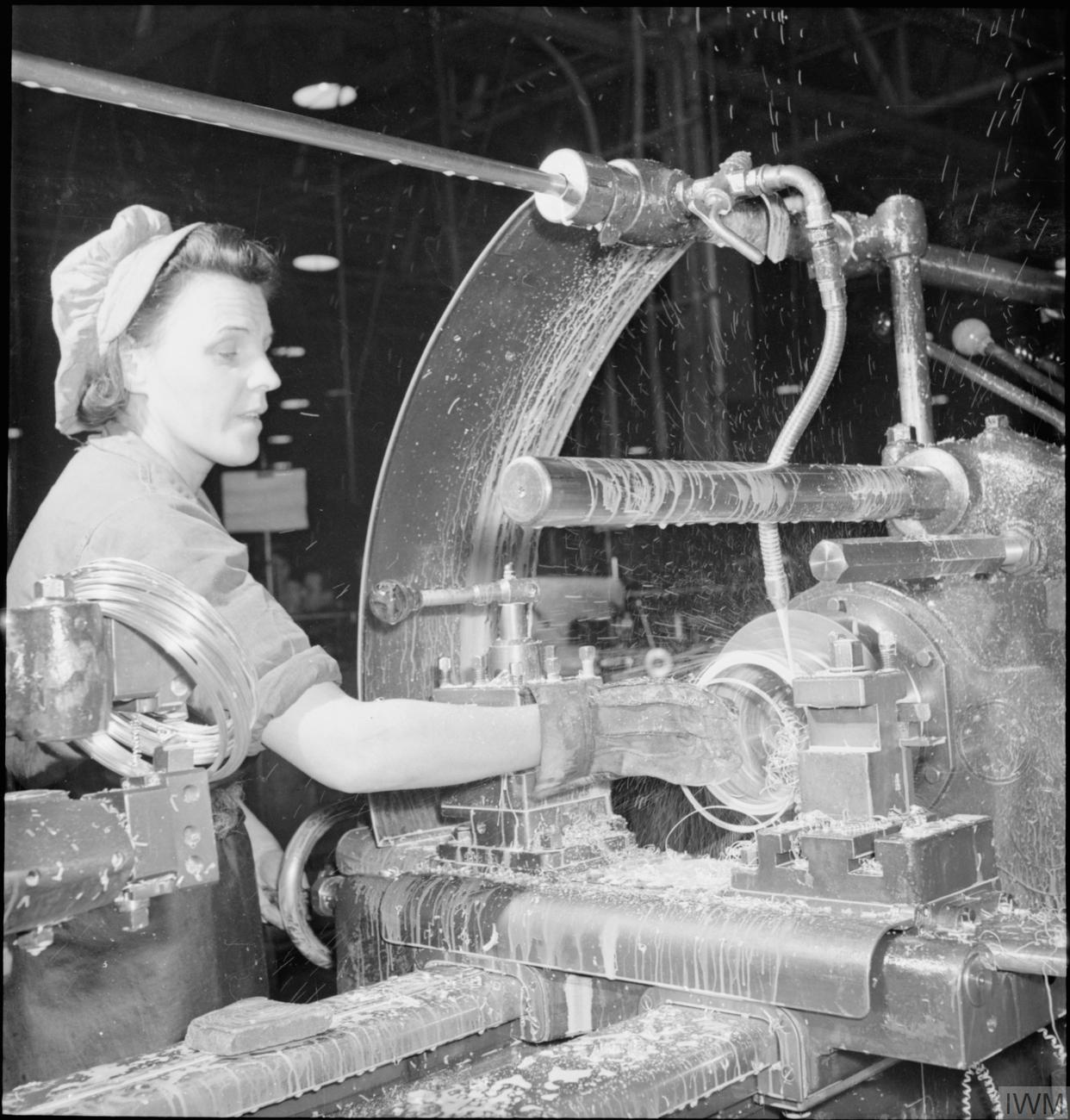
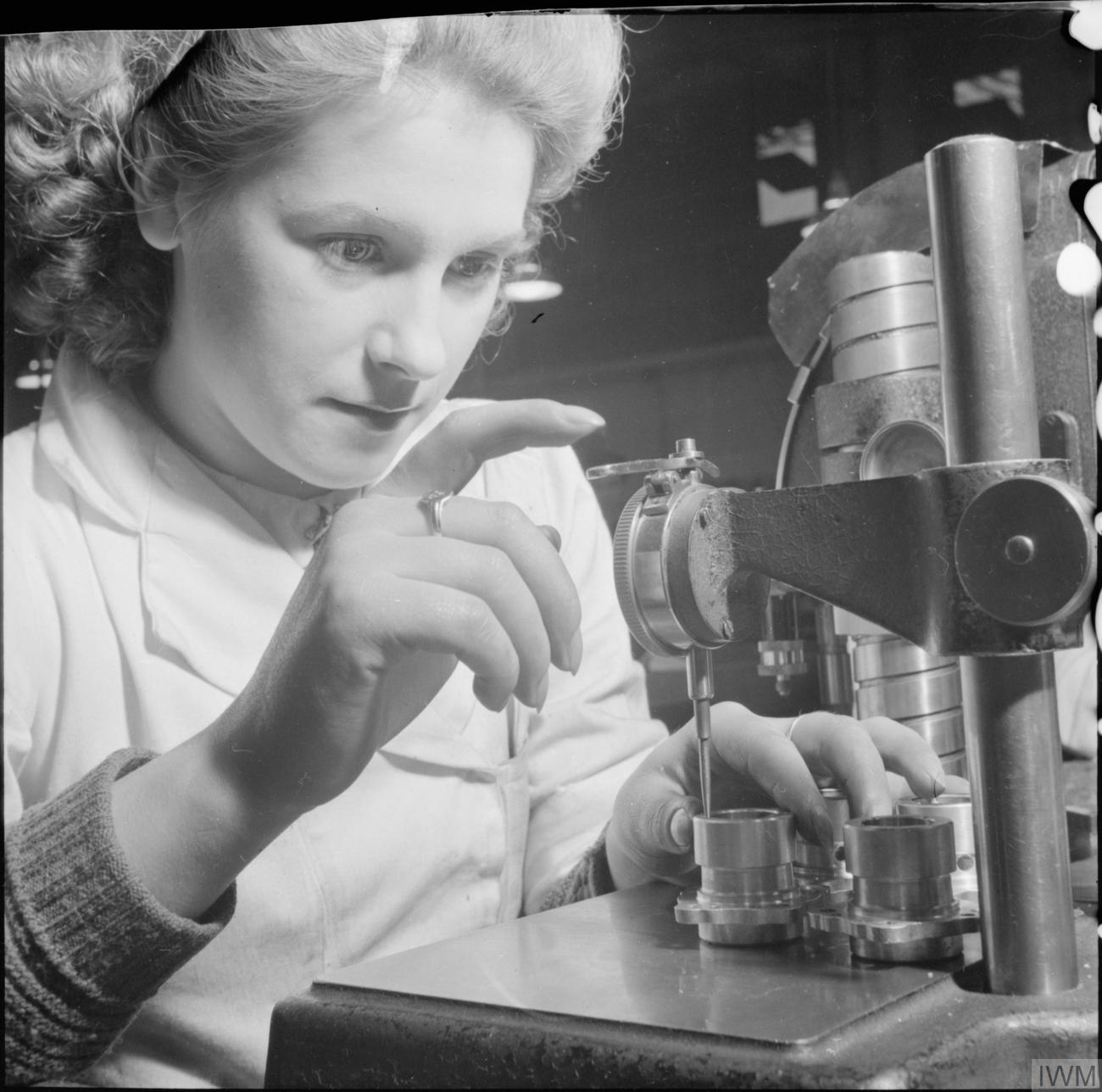
Female workers at a Rolls-Royce Merlin factory during the Second World War

The 1943 Rolls-Royce strike was a strike action called after Rolls-Royce failed to implement a 1940 agreement on equal pay for female workers at its Hillington plant in Scotland. This plant produced the Rolls-Royce Merlin V-12 engine, used by British fighter and bomber aircraft in the Second World War. The strike, led by Agnes McLean, lasted for around a month before Rolls-Royce agreed to implement equal pay for equal work. It was the only major strike over women's pay during the war.

== Background ==
The Rolls-Royce factory at Hillington, near Glasgow, Scotland, was built just before the start of the Second World War in 1939 as part of the British shadow factories scheme to disperse and increase British aircraft production. It produced the Rolls-Royce Merlin V-12 engine, used by the Hawker Hurricane and Supermarine Spitfire fighter aircraft. With men required on the frontlines the Extended Employment Agreement was signed by management in 1940 which permitted women to be employed at the factory in engineering roles previously reserved for men. The agreement provided that they would be granted the same rate of pay as men after 32 weeks experience. Soon some two-thirds of the factory's 24,000 employees were women.

One of the female employees was Agnes McLean, a crane driver and trade union activist. McLean led a strike in 1941 which won the right for women at the factory to join a union. She afterwards joined the Amalgamated Engineering Union (AEU) but found it hard to get other women to join up. By 1943 the factory was producing 400 engines a week but equal pay had not been achieved; women workers received 43 shillings (£2.15) per week while men received 73 shillings (£3.65). An industrial tribunal ruled that Rolls-Royce had broken the Extended Employment Agreement and reached a settlement with the company. The women, however, refused to accept this settlement which fell short of equal pay for equal work and, led by McLean, went on strike in November 1943.

== Strike ==
The strike began on early November and was carried out by members of the AEU and the Transport and General Workers' Union with male workers also joining in sympathy with their female colleagues. Around 16,000 employees joined the strike and it threatened to spread to other nearby factories. Not all were supportive, some local women were angry that the strike was taking place and hampering the war effort while their husbands and sons were fighting on the frontlines and pelted the strikers with vegetables.

After about a month, and with 730,000 hours of work lost, Rolls-Royce agreed to pay all workers on the basis of the job performed and not gender and the strike ended.

== Analysis ==
The strike was the only major strike over women's wages during the war. It was also unusual as a strike that affected the aeronautical industry, most engineering strikes during the war affected the marine industry and shipbuilding in particular. The Hillington strike is thought to have reflected a growing activism among female engineers at the time as well as the traditional radical political culture of Red Clydeside and a general dissatisfaction in Glasgow with the anti-strike stance held by the Communist Party of Great Britain during the war.
