= David G. A. McLean =

Canadian lawyer and businessman (1938–2025)

David G. A. McLean OBC
- Born: David George Alexander McLean; June 25, 1938; Calgary, Alberta, Canada
- Died: January 23, 2025 (aged 86); Vancouver, British Columbia, Canada
- Education: University of Alberta

David George Alexander McLean OBC (June 25, 1938 – January 23, 2025) was a Canadian lawyer, businessman and the chairman of the Board of the Canadian National Railway Company, and formerly of BC Rail until it was acquired by CN.

McLean was born in Calgary, Alberta on June 25, 1938. He received a bachelor of arts degree in 1959 and a bachelor of law degree in 1962 from the University of Alberta.

In 1972, McLean founded his own real estate investment firm, the McLean Group and was the chairman of the board and chief executive officer. The McLean Group also owned Vancouver Film Studios until 2023.

From 1983 to 1985, McLean served as chair of the University of British Columbia's board of governors.

In 1994, McLean was appointed to the board of directors of the Canadian National Railway Company, where he was also a member of the board from 1979 to 1986, and became chairman in December 1994.

McLean was appointed to the Order of British Columbia in 1999.

On January 24, 2018, McLean was appointed the honorary lieutenant-colonel of the Seaforth Highlanders of Canada. On May 26, 2021, he was appointed the honorary colonel of the Seaforth Highlanders, remaining in that position until February 2022.

McLean died in Vancouver on January 23, 2025, at the age of 86.
