= SS West Cawthon =

American cargo ship

History
- Name: West Cawthon (1919–40); Empire Bison (1940)
- Owner: USSB (1919–20); Green Star Line (1920–22); USSB (1922–1926); Farrell Group (1926–40); Ministry of War Transport (1940)
- Operator: Matson Navigation Co. (1919–1920); Imperial Shipping Co. (1920–22); Baltimore Oceanic Steamship Co. (1923); Mallory Steamship Co. (1923–1924); American-South African Line (1926–1940); Sir R Ropner & Co Ltd (1940)
- Port of registry: New York(1919–40); London (1940)
- Ordered: 16 March 1918
- Builder: Southwestern Shipbuilding Co., San Pedro
- Cost: $1,797,101.82
- Yard number: 6
- Laid down: 4 January 1919
- Launched: 16 April 1919
- Commissioned: 27 June 1919
- Maiden voyage: 13 July 1919
- Out of service: 1 November 1940
- Identification: US official number 218322 (1919–40); code letters LRPW (1930–34); call sign KILZ (1934–40); UK official number 167628 (1940); call sign GTQS (1940)
- Fate: Sunk, 1 November 1940

General characteristics
- Type: Design 1019 cargo ship
- Tonnage: 5,534 GRT (1919–1931); 5,612 GRT (1931–1942); 4,096 NRT (1919–1931); 3,492 NRT (1931–1942); 8,553 DWT
- Length: 410.5 ft (125.12 m)
- Beam: 54.3 ft (16.55 m)
- Depth: 27.2 ft (8.29 m)
- Installed power: 2,800 ihp, 359 Nhp
- Propulsion: Llewellyn Iron Works 3-cylinder triple expansion
- Speed: 10.5 knots (19.4 km/h; 12.1 mph)
- Crew: 35

West Cawthon was a steam cargo ship built in 1919 by Southwestern Shipbuilding Co. of San Pedro for the United States Shipping Board (USSB) as part of the wartime shipbuilding program of the Emergency Fleet Corporation (EFC) to restore the nation's Merchant Marine. Initially, the vessel was placed in the Pacific trade, but was soon acquired by the Green Star Steamship Co. and was put on the Gulf to the Mediterranean route. In 1923 Green Star Steamship Co. went bankrupt and vessel was bought back by USSB. The freighter then spent next two years serving the Mediterranean ports of Italy and Spain before being laid up late in 1924. In 1926 the vessel was bought by the American-South African Line and for the next fourteen years continuously sailed between the East Coast of the United States and South Africa. In 1940 she was sold to the Ministry of War Transport (MoWT) and renamed Empire Bison. The ship was torpedoed and sunk by German submarine U-124 on 1 November 1940 on one of her regular convoy trips.

== Design and construction ==
After the United States entry into World War I, a large shipbuilding program was undertaken to restore and enhance shipping capabilities both of the United States and their Allies. As part of this program, EFC placed orders with nation's shipyards for a large number of vessels of standard designs. Most of these new vessels were known as the West ships as they were built by several shipyards on the West Coast of the United States and all were given names that began with the word West. Design 1019 cargo ship was among the designs adopted by USSB, and was a standard cargo freighter of approximately 8,800 deadweight tonnage designed by Theodore E. Ferris.

West Cawthon was part of the order for ten vessels placed by USSB with the Southwestern Shipbuilding Co. on 16 March 1918 and was laid down at the shipbuilder's yard on 4 January 1919 and launched on 16 April 1919 (yard number 6), with Miss Virginia Llewellyn, daughter of William Llewellyn, vice-president of Llewellyn Iron Works, being the sponsor. Captain A. F. Pillsbury, chief of the Western Division for EFC, witnessed the launch together with several hundred people, mostly workers of the shipyard.

Similar to all vessels of this class the ship had two main decks and was built on the three-island principle of ship construction. She had her machinery situated amidships and had five main holds which allowed for the carriage of a variety of goods and merchandise. The vessel also possessed all the modern machinery for quick loading and unloading of cargo from five large hatches, including ten winches and eleven booms. She was also equipped with wireless apparatus and submarine signal system and had electric lights installed along the decks.

As built, the ship was 410.5 feet (125.1 m) long (between perpendiculars) and 54.3 feet (16.6 m) abeam, and had a depth of 27.2 feet (8.3 m). West Cawthon was originally assessed at 5,534 GRT and 4,096 NRT and had deadweight tonnage of approximately 8,553. The vessel had a steel hull and a single 2,800 ihp triple expansion steam engine, with cylinders of 24 1/2-inch (62 cm), 41 1/2-inch (105 cm) and 72-inch (180 cm) diameter with a 48-inch (120 cm) stroke that moved the ship at up to 10.5 knots (12.1 mph; 19.4 km/h). The steam for the engine was supplied by three Scotch marine boilers fitted both for coal and oil fuel.

The sea trials were held on June 22 during which the ship performed satisfactorily. Following their completion West Cawthon was inspected by USSB representatives and officially accepted by them on June 27.

== Operational history ==
Upon acceptance by the Shipping Board, West Cawthon was allocated to Matson Navigation Company and departed the same day for San Francisco to load cargo for her upcoming trip. When there she embarked full load of various Army and Navy supplies including full deckload of military trucks and two motor launches destined for American troops stationed in the Philippines. West Cawthon left San Francisco on July 13 and after short stopover at Honolulu for bunkers continued to her final destination arriving at Manila on August 15. After unloading, the freighter embarked almost 9,000 tons of hemp and departed Manila on September 15. After fighting through a typhoon off Japanese coast for two days, she returned to San Francisco on October 9, successfully completing her maiden voyage. On 13 November 1919 the freighter was finishing up loading with niter from a barge next to her to complete her cargo. After embarking about 150 tons of niter, a fire was discovered on board the barge. Tugs were hurriedly dispatched and the barge containing about 1,500 tons of niter was pulled out to midstream where it exploded. West Cawthon did not suffer any damages as a result of quick actions undertaken by firefighters and was able to depart on her second voyage to the Far East two days later.

In early December 1919, while still en route, West Cawthon was sold by USSB to the Imperial Shipping Corporation, a wholly owned subsidiary of the Green Star Line. In mid-December it was further disclosed that Imperial Shipping Corp. bought five vessels from USSB for $6,665,000, with West Cawthon valued at $1,881,660. The vessel picked up a large cargo of rice and exotic animals on her visit to Manila and Hong Kong and returned to San Francisco on 22 March 1920 to discharge some of her cargo, including animals, and load some canned goods for delivery to Cuba. She passed through the Panama Canal on April 7–9 and then continued on to Santiago de Cuba to deliver her cargo of foodstuffs. Due to considerable congestion in the harbor, the ship was forced to unload her cargo at Cienfuegos and then sailed for Norfolk reaching it on May 24. Subsequently, West Cawthon departed Norfolk on June 2 bound for Galveston where she were to take on a cargo of grain for delivery to Italy. The vessel sailed from Galveston on June 22 laden with 269,000 bushels of wheat and returned to New York from Spezia in ballast on August 18 concluding her first full trip under new ownership. West Cawthon made two more trips to Europe during 1920, one to Italy and one to Hamburg. Upon her return to Baltimore on 3 February 1921, the ship was laid up as the overabundance of available tonnage and scarcity of cargo produced a full-scale shipping crisis. The crisis hit Green Star Steamship Co. very hard. After its organization it chose rapid expansion, acquiring close to forty vessels and incurring a large amount of debt. As business dried up, and many ships were forced to be either laid up or sit idle in ports, the company defaulted on its debt obligations, and after a two-year-long struggle to get help from USSB, it was forced into receivership and had to sell its assets. West Cawthon remained idle during this period of time, but eventually was bought by USSB for $124,000 in early August 1922 at the U.S. Marshal's auction held in Baltimore. Following the acquisition, the Shipping Board paid approximately $13,000 for the vessel's repairs and subsequently put it out for sale in November of the same year together with many other ships in their possession.

In January 1923 as the sea trade rebounded, West Cawthon was originally allocated to International Freighting Corporation to serve their Philadelphia to ports of River Plate route. Following the allocation, the ship proceeded to New York on January 23. The freighter, however, never entered the South American trade and remained in New York through the end of March when she was chartered by Baltimore Oceanic Steamship Company, who operated a number of routes out of Baltimore to many Mediterranean and Black Sea ports. West Cawthon cleared from Baltimore on her first trip under new management on April 4. After stops at Philadelphia and New York to load the remainder of her cargo, she sailed from New York on April 14 bound for Genoa, Marseille and Leghorn. After visiting her ports of call, she returned to Philadelphia on June 8 in ballast. The ship conducted two more trips to Italy under Baltimore Oceanic Steamship Co. management. Upon arrival at New York from her last trip on Christmas Day 1923 she was put under control of Mallory Steamship Company who similarly operated a large scale service route to the Mediterranean ports of Italy and Spain. West Cawthon sailed to Philadelphia for loading on December 30, but encountered heavy fog and went aground off Edgemoor during the night. The freighter was refloated around 03:00 next morning with the help of tug Juno and after a brief inspection arrived at her destination.

West Cawthon spent an entire 1924 under Mallory Line control, making several trips from the East Coast of the United States to various ports in the Mediterranean. Typically, the vessel would carry general cargo to Marseille, Leghorn and Genoa on her eastward journeys, occasionally supplementing it with grain and coke. On her westward trips she would also carry various general cargoes in addition to some local specialties such as pumice from Lipari, lemons from Sicily and onions from Valencia and Gandia. Upon arrival at New York from her last trip on 10 November 1924, West Cawthon was returned to USSB due significant reduction of available cargo on her homebound trips. The ship then was laid up and spent an entire 1925 berthed in New York.

=== South African trade (1926-1940) ===
In late 1925 James A. Farrell, Jr. formed a private owned company which was incorporated as America South African Line, Inc. The company's goal was to establish and maintain a direct trade route between the United States and the ports of British and Portuguese South Africa. In December 1925 the newly established company bought from USSB the American South African Line. In addition, the company purchased from the Shipping Board five ships, including West Cawthon, for about $780,000 and the right to operate them on the certified route between United States Atlantic ports and ports in South and East Africa and islands in the Indian Ocean. As part of this transaction, West Cawthon was valued at $154,827.40.

After repairs and reconditioning, West Cawthon loaded her cargo and sailed from New York on her first voyage under new ownership on 27 March 1926 bound for Cape Town. After an uneventful voyage the freighter returned to Baltimore on July 18, successfully bringing her first trip to completion. Aside from Cape Town, the ship served other African ports such as Port Natal, East London, Algoa Bay in South Africa, as well as Lourenço Marques and Beira in Portuguese East Africa. She typically carried general cargo as well as steel and machinery on her outbound voyages. The ship carried general cargo such as animal skins, wool, ostrich feathers as well as chrome ore and other cargoes on her trips homebound. For example, she brought in such cargo of wool, hides, chrome ore and whale guano to Boston and Baltimore in November 1927 upon return from one of her regular trips. The vessel continued to serve the South African trade route through the early part of 1940.

In addition to her regular cargo West Cawthon carried exotic animals from Africa for local North American zoos. For example, in August 1931 she brought in a large lot of various animals including pythons, African warthogs, ratels and other animals destined for Toronto Zoo. Three pythons and one Secretary bird died during the voyage. Similarly, she delivered monkeys, hedgehogs and various exotic birds consigned to the Staten Island Zoo in October 1937.

The vessel also occasionally carried unusual cargoes during her career. For example, in December 1934 she carried one disassembled and crated Beechcraft aircraft to her new owner in Cape Town. This was the first time the aircraft was shipped and delivered in such a manner and was accompanied on this voyage by Opie K. Swope, president of the Beechcraft flying service. In October 1936 West Cawthon carried as deckload one narrow gauge 74-ton 2-10-2 steam locomotive built by the Baldwin Locomotive Works for delivery to Anyati Colliery in South Africa.

Even though West Cawthon had very limited passenger accommodations, she carried some occasional travelers on her trips to Africa. Most of these passengers were either engineers and other professionals, or missionaries, but the ship occasionally carried some celebrities. In June 1936 Mrs. Agnes Morrow Scandrett, sister of late senator Dwight Morrow and aunt of Anne Morrow Lindbergh, used the vessel to return to United States from her African trip. In May 1932 West Cawthon transported a runaway kidnapper, Martin DePew, who kidnapped a wealthy Kansas City woman, Mrs. Nell Donnelly, but managed to escape to South Africa following her release. The ship arrived at Philadelphia on 12 June 1932 to transfer DePew into Kansas City Police custody.

=== The World War II ===
With the onset of World War II, West Cawthon continued sailing on her usual route to South Africa. In February 1940 she brought into New York $3,000,000 worth of gold from South Africa to establish British credits in the United States to procure war matériel and supplies. With mounting shipping losses, the British Ministry of War Transport (MoWT) asked the Maritime Commission to approve the sale of two steamers to a British operator. This sale was approved on 2 May 1940, with American-South African Line agreeing to sell two of their aging vessels, West Cawthon and West Isleta, to Sir R. Ropner & Co. of West Hartlepool and apply the proceeds towards purchase of new steamers. At the time of the sale West Cawthon was on her regular trip and arrived at Philadelphia on 14 June 1940 to discharge her cargo. The freighter then loaded a cargo of steel and general merchandise and sailed from Halifax as part of convoy HX 58 on 15 July 1940 bound for Liverpool. The convoy reached its destination on 31 July, where West Cawthon was officially transferred into British registry, defensively armed with a 4 in (100 mm) naval gun and renamed Empire Bison.

Afterwards, the vessel sailed from Liverpool in ballast on September 5 as part of convoy OB 209 bound for North America. At about 0600 on September 8 while the ship was in approximate position 55°17′N 18°03′W, roughly 300 nautical miles (560 km) west of Ireland, Empire Bison was spotted by a German Fw-200 Condor bomber from Kampfgeschwader 40 on a regular reconnaissance and anti-shipping mission. The bomber fired its cannon and shot off the ship's antenna preventing her from sending S.O.S. signal. The plane then proceeded to attack the vessel dropping eight bombs, all of which missed the freighter, some of them by less than twenty feet. Not willing to give up, the plane then spent the next half hour continuously strafing Empire Bison from its cannon and machine guns, decimating two lifeboats and riddling every room on the vessel with bullets. Fortunately, not a single person was injured during the attack. After the bomber's departure, Empire Bison was able to proceed on her travel and safely reached Hampton Roads on September 21.

Empire Bison then continued to Baltimore where the damage caused by the attack was quickly repaired. The ship then loaded a cargo consisting of 6,067 tons of scrap steel and 94 trucks and sailed for Halifax on October 12. She reached Nova Scotia four days later and was assigned to the next convoy to take her to United Kingdom.

==== Sinking ====
Empire Bison left from Halifax together with forty three other vessels as part of convoy HX 82 on 20 October 1940. The freighter was under command of captain William Herbert Harland, had a crew of thirty two, and additionally carried eight passengers and one gunner. Soon after the departure the weather started to change for the worse and by October 23 turned into a strong gale. Empire Bison started to fall behind the rest of the convoy, first being in the company of four other vessels, but by the next morning she found herself completely alone. The weather remained stormy for the duration of the trip, but the freighter was able to maintain the speed of approximately 9 knots (10 mph). During the night of October 31 when the vessel was about 200 nautical miles (370 km) northwest of Rockall, she was spotted by U-124 under command of Georg-Wilhelm Schultz. U-124 was on a meteorological mission following damage to torpedo tubes sustained by the submarine during one of the crash dives earlier in her patrol. The U-boat immediately abandoned her meteorological observations and started shadowing the ship. At approximately 06:18 on November 1 U-124 fired a torpedo from her only functional bow tube but missed. After reloading, the submarine fired another torpedo at the steamer at approximately 07:06. Empire Bison was hit on her port side between the No. 1 and No. 2 holds. The resulting explosion brought down her foremast, and the ship began filling quickly. Due to stormy weather no lifeboats could be lowered and the entire crew hastily abandoned the vessel by jumping overboard. Empire Bison soon sank in an approximate position 59°30′N 17°40′W. Out of forty two people on board the ship, only three crew members and one passenger managed to survive as they were able to find a raft floating among the debris. The survivors remained afloat for the next several days until they were spotted and picked up on 5 November by the Danish steamship Olga S and landed at Gourock.

== Memorial ==
Those lost on Empire Bison are commemorated at the Tower Hill Memorial, London.
