= Daniel McLean =

Daniel McLean may refer to:

- Daniel McLean (businessman) (1770–1823), Virginia businessman in banking and sugar refining
- Daniel McLean (Canadian politician) (1868–1950), politician in Manitoba, Canada
- Alexander Daniel McLean, Canadian politician
- Daniel McLean (sheriff) (1854–1908), politician and sheriff in Manitoba, Canada
- Daniel E. McLean (died 1980), American politician, mayor of Beverly, Massachusetts, 1937–1949
- Daniel G. McLean, American lawyer and politician in Florida
- Daniel V. McLean (1801–1869), Presbyterian minister and the fifth president of Lafayette College
- Dan McLean (journalist) (1947–2026), Canadian news anchor
