= Macklin (surname) =

Macklin is a surname, derived ultimately from the Irish Mac Gille Eoin. Notable people with the surname include:

- Anderson Delano Macklin (1933–2001), American artist, educator
- Bill Macklin. American lawyer, judge, and politician
- Carmel Macklin, American actress
- Charles Macklin, 18th century Irish actor
- David Macklin, American football player
- David Macklin (rower), British Olympic rower
- Gordon Macklin, American businessman
- Jenny Macklin, Australian politician
- John Macklin, American athlete, coach, and administrator
- Lance Macklin, British racing driver
- Marie Macklin, Scottish entrepreneur and public speaker
- Matthew Macklin, British-Irish boxer
- Paul Macklin, Canadian politician and lawyer
- Rudy Macklin (born 1958), American basketball player
- Thomas Macklin, 18th century British publisher
- Thomas Eyre Macklin (1867–1943), British sculptor
- Vernon Macklin, American basketball player

== See also ==
- Maclean, Clan MacLean for Scottish form
- Macklyn, a given name
