= USS Acoma (YTB-701) =

Tugboat of the United States Navy

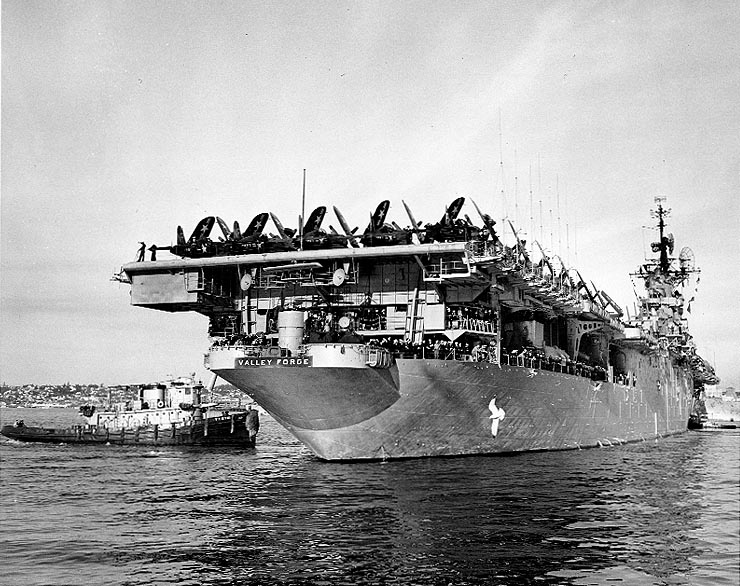
- Acoma assisting the USS Valley Forge to depart San Diego, California, from off the carrier's port quarter.

History

United States
- Name: USS Acoma
- Namesake: Acoma Pueblo, a Keresan tribe from New Mexico
- Builder: Bethlehem Shipbuilding San Pedro
- Laid down: 2 July 1945
- Launched: 30 August 1945
- Acquired: by the Navy on 12 March 1946
- Commissioned: August 1946
- Recommissioned: February 1962
- Decommissioned: December 1985
- Reclassified: YTM-701, February 1962
- Stricken: December 1985
- Fate: Transferred to unspecified Government agency; fate unknown

General characteristics
- Type: Hisada-class district harbor tug, large
- Tonnage: 260 tons
- Length: 100 ft (30 m)
- Beam: 25 ft (7.6 m)
- Draft: 9 ft 7 in (2.92 m)
- Propulsion: diesel engine, single screw
- Speed: 12 knots (22 km/h)

USS Acoma (YTB-701/YTM-701) was a Hisada-class district harbor tug built during the end of World War II. She was placed into reserve until 1962, when she was released to the 1st Naval District, where she served as a tugboat for the next 40 years before being disposed of, as excess to Navy needs.

== Built in California ==
Acoma (YTB-701) was laid down on 2 July 1945 at San Pedro, California, by the Bethlehem Shipbuilding; launched on 30 August 1945, delivered to the Navy on 12 March 1946; and placed in the San Diego, California, Group of the Pacific Reserve Fleet.

== Post-World War II service ==
However, the tug was activated in August 1946 for duty in the 1st Naval District. In February 1962, Acoma was reclassified a medium harbor tug and was redesignated YTM-701.

== Final decommissioning ==
She concluded almost 40 years of service in December 1985 when she was placed out of service. Her name was struck from the Naval Vessel Register at the same time, and she was subsequently transferred to some unspecified other agency.
