= USS Hugh W. Hadley =

Allen M. Sumner-class destroyer

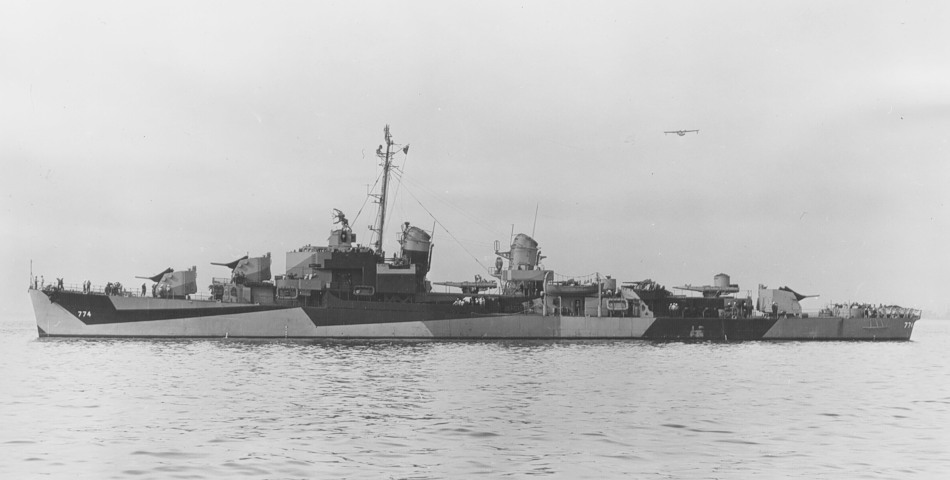
- USS Hugh W. Hadley

History

United States
- Name: Hugh W. Hadley
- Namesake: Hugh William Hadley
- Builder: Bethlehem Shipbuilding, San Pedro
- Laid down: 6 February 1944
- Launched: 16 July 1944
- Commissioned: 25 November 1944
- Decommissioned: 15 December 1945
- Stricken: 8 January 1946
- Fate: Severely damaged by MXY-7 kamikaze aircraft, scrapped on 2 September 1947

General characteristics
- Class & type: Allen M. Sumner-class destroyer
- Displacement: 2,200 tons
- Length: 376 ft 6 in (114.76 m)
- Beam: 40 ft (12 m)
- Draft: 15 ft 8 in (4.78 m)
- Propulsion: 60,000 shp (45,000 kW); 2 propellers
- Speed: 34 knots (63 km/h; 39 mph)
- Range: 6,500 nmi (12,000 km; 7,500 mi) at 15 kn (28 km/h; 17 mph)
- Complement: 336
- Armament: 6 × 5 in (127 mm)/38 cal. guns, 12 × 40 mm AA guns, 11 × 20 mm AA guns, 10 × 21 inch (533 mm) torpedo tubes, 6 × depth charge projectors, 2 × depth charge tracks

USS Hugh W. Hadley (DD-774) was an Allen M. Sumner-class destroyer which served in the United States Navy during World War II.

== Namesake ==
Hugh William Hadley was born on 17 February 1901 at Moro, Oregon. He was appointed to the United States Naval Academy in 1918. Commissioned Ensign on 29 May 1922, he served on board many ships, including USS Pennsylvania and USS S-27, and various shore stations in the prewar years. After serving as Executive Officer of USS Roper from 1936 to 1939 and on board USS Maryland from 1941 to 1942, he was appointed Commander and assigned to command Transport Division 12 in the Pacific. Hadley's attack transports made nightly runs into Guadalcanal to support American troops fighting in the Guadalcanal campaign and while on board USS Little on 5 September 1942 Hadley was surprised by three Imperial Japanese Navy destroyers off Lunga Point. Little fought valiantly, but was sunk along with the attack transport USS Gregory. Hadley was killed in the action and was posthumously awarded the Silver Star.

== Construction and commissioning ==
Hugh W. Hadley (DD-774) was launched by Bethlehem Shipbuilding, San Pedro, Los Angeles, 16 July 1944; sponsored by Mrs. Hadley, widow of the namesake; and commissioned on 25 November 1944. It played a significant role in the Battle of Okinawa as part of the Northern Attack Force Screen (Task Group 53.6) in the Okinawa naval order of battle.

== Pacific ==
After shakedown training off the coast of California, Hugh W. Hadley sailed 21 February 1945 in company with HMS Ranee for Pearl Harbor. The ships arrived 27 February, but Hugh W. Hadley was soon underway again, sailing eight days later for Ulithi and the great Okinawa invasion.

=== Okinawa ===
The ship departed in company with a large group of LST's and their escorts on 25 March bound for the Japanese island stronghold, and arrived off the Okinawa group on 31 March. As the night approach was made, Hadley led a group of LST's toward the beach, shooting down an attacking Japanese plane en route. The destroyer escorted her charges safely to the beach, watched them unload their troops and equipment the morning of 1 April, and then took up antisubmarine patrol station outside the transport area. As the bitter fighting ashore continued, Hadley helped protect against submarines and aircraft as the Japanese made a final effort to stop the invasion. The ship remained on patrol until 4 April, when she sailed with a group of transports to Saipan, arriving on 14 April.

Hadley was soon on her way back to Okinawa, however, and arrived from Saipan on 27 April to resume her outer patrol. For the next few days the destroyer fought off numerous air raids, picked up a downed fighter pilot, and carried out antisubmarine patrol. She went alongside the destroyer Brown on 1 May for transfer of communication equipment, and then took up additional duties as a fighter direction ship for the Combat Air Patrols, so vital to the invasion's air cover.

As radar picket ships were scarce, Hadley was assigned this duty on the afternoon of 10 May. Joining destroyer Evans and four smaller craft, she took station 15 west of Okinawa and early the next morning began vectoring aircraft to meet the oncoming Japanese. For nearly two hours the morning of 11 May, Hadley and Evans came under severe attack, as the Japanese mounted their sixth attack against American forces at Okinawa. Both ships maneuvered at high speed, downing many kamikazes and directing air attacks on formations of Japanese. The attackers numbered some 150 planes. After Evans took several serious hits and went dead in the water about 0900, Hadley fought on alone. At 0920, she was attacked by 10 planes simultaneously, from both ahead and astern. The ship destroyed all 10, but not without damage to herself. One bomb hit aft, a Yokosuka MXY-7 Ohka hit, and two kamikaze crashes were inflicted on the ship as her gunners ran low on ammunition. Finally, as the attack ended, all but 50 of the crew were ordered over the side in life rafts, the remaining men fighting fires and working to control the damage. Though her engineering spaces were flooded and she was badly holed, Hugh W. Hadley was kept afloat by her damage control parties and eventually arrived at Ie Shima. The days action took the lives of 28 crew members, and wounded 67 more.

During this battle, Hadley had succeeded in downing some 23 enemy aircraft and aided in destroying several others. After temporary repairs, the ship was taken to Kerama Retto on 14 May, where men from repair ship Zaniah worked on her battered hull. Hadley subsequently was taken to Buckner Bay, Okinawa, in a floating drydock towed by Avoyel on 15 July 1945, and after 20 days there began the long voyage under tow of the US Navy tug ATA 199 to the United States. After encountering heavy weather during the passage the ship arrived at Hunter's Point, California, via Pearl Harbor, 26 September 1945. She was deemed as being too damaged to be repaired and was decommissioned on 15 December 1945. She was sold 2 September 1947 to Walter W. Johnson Co., San Francisco, and scrapped.

== Awards ==
In addition to one battle star for her World War II Service, Hadley received the Presidential Unit Citation for her performance in the action off Okinawa 11 May 1945. Also, several of her crew were decorated for their actions during the war.

=== Presidential Unit Citation ===
The President of the United States takes pleasure in presenting the PRESIDENTIAL UNIT CITATION to the UNITED STATES SHIP USS HUGH W. HADLEY (DD-774) for service as set forth in the following CITATION: For extraordinary heroism in action as Fighter Direction Ship on Radar Picket Station Number 15 during an attack by approximately 100 enemy Japanese planes, forty miles northwest of the Okinawa Transport Area, May 11, 1945. Fighting valiantly against waves of hostile suicide and dive-bombing planes plunging toward her from all directions, the U.S.S. HUGH HADLEY sent up relentless barrages of antiaircraft fire during one of the most furious air-sea battles of the war. Repeatedly finding her targets, she destroyed twenty enemy planes, skillfully directed her Combat Air Patrol in shooting down at least forty others and, by her vigilance and superb battle readiness, avoided damage to herself until subjected to a coordinated attack by ten Japanese planes. Assisting in the destruction of all ten of these, she was crashed by one bomb and three suicide planes with devastating effect. With all engineering spaces flooded and with a fire raging amidships, the gallant officers and men of the HUGH W. HADLEY fought desperately against almost insurmountable odds and, by their indomitable determination, fortitude and skill, brought the damage under control, enabling their ship to be towed to port and saved. Her brilliant performance in this action reflects the highest credit upon the HUGH W. HADLEY and the United States Naval Service.
