= McClain =

McClain (Gaelic: Mac Gill-Eain) is a surname. It is an American variant of the Scottish name McLean. Notable people with the surname include:

- Albritton McClain (born 1952), American guitarist
- Andrew McClain (1826–1913), Associate judge
- Anne McClain (born 1979), American astronaut and army colonel
- Cady McClain (born 1969), American actress
- Charly McClain (born 1956), American country music singer
- China Anne McClain (born 1998), American actress and singer
- Cormani McClain (born 2004), American football player
- Dave McClain (American football) (1938–1986), American football coach
- Dave McClain (musician) (born 1965), American drummer
- David McClain (president) (contemporary), American academic
- Dewey McClain (born 1954), American football player and politician
- Dwayne McClain (born 1963), American basketball player
- Edward McClain (Alabama politician) (1944–2020), American politician
- Elijah McClain (1996–2019), African-American man who died in police custody
- Elmo McClain (1917–1972), American politician
- Emlin McClain (1851–1915), American judge
- Frank B. McClain (1864–1925), American politician
- Jaylen McClain (born 2006), American football player
- Jimmy McClain (born 1980), American football player
- Jimmy McClain (radio personality) (born 1912), American radio personality
- John McClain, American sportswriter
- Johnathan McClain (contemporary), American stage and television actor
- Konnor McClain (born 2005), American artistic gymnast
- Leonard MacClain (1899–1967), American organist
- Le'Ron McClain (born 1984), American football player
- Leanita McClain (1951–1984), American journalist and commentator
- Linda McClain (born 1958), American law professor
- Lisa McClain (born 1966 as Lisa Iovannisci), American politician
- Malik McClain (born 2002), American football player
- Michael Sean McClain (born 1975), American fencer
- Patricia McClain (born 1954), American model
- Scott McClain (born 1972), American baseball player
- Sierra McClain (born 1994), American actress and singer
- Steve McClain (born 1962), American basketball coach
- Ted McClain (born 1946), American basketball player
- Thaddeus McClain (1876–1935), American track and field athlete
- Zakoby McClain (born 2000), American football player

Fictional people:

- Paul McClain, character in the Australian soap opera Neighbours
- Shauni McClain, character in the American TV series Baywatch

== Other uses ==
- McClain, West Virginia
- Thriii, a girl group formerly known as McClain

== See also ==
- Alton McClain and Destiny, 1970s American disco group
- McClain Airlines, former U.S. airline of the 1980s
- McClain County, Oklahoma, USA
- McClain High School (Greenfield, Ohio), USA
- McClain Printing Company, American printing company specializing in books of West Virginia history
- McClain's Law, American crime drama television series 1981–82
- Pratt & McClain, 1970s American commercial singing band
- Clan Maclean
- MacLaine
- McClean (disambiguation)
- McLean
