= Steven MacLean =

Steven MacLean, or a variation thereof, may refer to:

- Steve MacLean (astronaut) (born 1954), Canadian astronaut
- Steven MacLean (footballer) (born 1982), Scottish footballer (Sheffield Wednesday, Plymouth Argyle, St. Johnstone)
- Steve McLean (born 1961), Scottish-American soccer player
- Steven McLean (born 1981), Scottish football referee
- Stephen McLean, musician in Meat Whiplash
- Stephen McLean, see List of Global Television Network personalities
- Stephen MacLean (1950–2006), Australian screenwriter and director
