= General McLane School District =

School district in Pennsylvania, United States

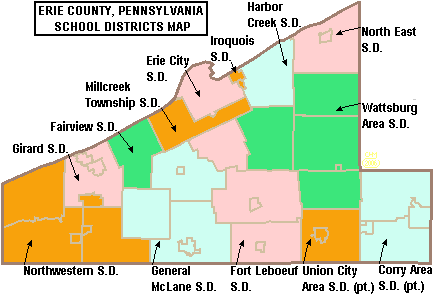

Address
- 11771 Edinboro Road Edinboro, Pennsylvania, 16412; United States

District information
- Type: Public
- Grades: K–12
- NCES District ID: 4210650

Students and staff
- Students: 2,064 (2020–2021)
- Teachers: 143.56 (on an FTE basis)
- Staff: 167.12 (on an FTE basis)
- Student–teacher ratio: 14.38:1

Other information
- Website: www.generalmclane.net

General McLane School District is a school district located in Erie County, Pennsylvania, U.S.A. It comprises the townships of Franklin, McKean, and Washington; the boroughs of McKean and Edinboro, are located in McKean and Washington townships, respectively.

The district operates four schools: General McLane High School (9-12), James W. Parker Middle School (5-8), and Edinboro and McKean Elementary schools (K-4).

== Extracurriculars ==
General McLane High School achieved particular recognition on December 15, 2006, when its football team won the Pennsylvania Interscholastic Athletic Association (PIAA) Class AAA State championship despite it being the state's smallest AAA school. On March 23, 2007, the Boys' Varsity Basketball Team won the Class AAA State championship, making GM the first school in PIAA history to win state championships in football and basketball in the same academic year.

General Mclane has a widely recognized marching band that operates in the Lakeshore Marching Band Association (LMBA). In 2022 the GM girls soccer team made state runner ups in 2A.
