= McLaine =

McLaine is a surname. Notable people with the surname include:

- Darren McLaine (born 1961), Australian rules footballer
- Ed McLaine (c. 1899–1972), Scottish-Canadian soccer player
- William McLaine (1891–1960), British trade unionist

== See also ==
- MacLaine
- McLain
- McLane
