= Yolanda McClean =

Canadian library technician and trade unionist

Yolanda McClean is a Canadian library technician and trade unionist. Since 2021, She has been the Secretary-Treasurer of the Canadian Union of Public Employees in Ontario, which is the largest union in the province. She is also the Executive Vice-president at the Ontario Federation of Labour. She is the first Black Canadian to hold either position. She began her career in 1984 as a library technician in the Toronto District School Board.

In 2018, she was named one of the top 100 Accomplished Black Canadian Women.

In April 2022, she was elected vice-president of CUPE Ontario, becoming the first Black and racialized officer of CUPE Ontario. A month later, McClean was elected Third Vice-president of the Coalition of Black Trade Unionists.

In August 2022, McClean called on organized labour to support the Black Lives Matter movement.

In January 2023, rabble.ca noted that McClean was leading the union's Anti-Racism Organizational Action Plan Committee. A month later in February 2023, she appeared rabble.ca's podcast where she discussed "ways of achieving gender and racial equity inside and outside of Canada’s labour movement."
