= Rory MacLean =

Canadian historian and travel writer

Rory MacLean FRSL
- Born: 5 November 1954 (age 72); Vancouver, Canada
- Education: Upper Canada College; Toronto Metropolitan University
- Occupations: Historian and travel writer
- Notable work: Stalin's Nose (1992); The Oatmeal Ark (1997)
- Website: rorymaclean.com

Rory MacLean FRSL (born 5 November 1954) is a British-Canadian historian and travel writer who lives and works in Berlin, Palermo and the United Kingdom. Among his best known works are Stalin's Nose (1992), a travelogue through eastern Europe after the fall of the Berlin Wall; Magic Bus (2006), a history of the Asia Overland hippie trail; and Berlin: Imagine a City (2014), a portrait of that city over 500 years, and Geography of Heaven: Travels to the Hereafter (2026). In 2019, John le Carré wrote that MacLean "must surely be the outstanding, and most indefatigable, traveller-writer of our time."

== Biography ==
MacLean was born in Vancouver, Canada, in 1954, the son of Canadian newspaper publisher Andrew Dyas MacLean and Joan Howe, former secretary to author Ian Fleming at The Times and part-inspiration for the fictional James Bond character Miss Moneypenny. He grew up in Toronto, graduating from Upper Canada College and Toronto Metropolitan University. For ten years, he was involved in movie productions, working with David Hemmings and Ken Russell in England, David Bowie in Berlin and London, and Marlene Dietrich in Paris.

In 1989, MacLean won The Independent inaugural travel writing competition and changed from screen to prose writing. After completing nine travel books in the UK, he wrote Berlin: Imagine a City in the capital where he blogged for the Meet the Germans website of the Goethe-Institut. On the publication of MacLean's 15th book Pravda Ha Ha: Truth, Lies and the End of Europe, Jan Morris wrote: "This is a tremendous thing that MacLean is creating; a new kind of history, in several dimensions and innumerable moods, that adds up to — across the span of his books — a great and continuing work of literature."

MacLean is a Fellow of the Royal Society of Literature and founder and curator of the annual Sherborne Travel Writing Festival.

== Writing career ==
MacLean's first book, Stalin's Nose (1992), told the story of a journey from Berlin to Moscow in a Trabant and became a UK top-ten best-seller, winning the Yorkshire Post's Best First Work prize. William Dalrymple called it, "the most extraordinary debut in travel writing since Bruce Chatwin's In Patagonia". Colin Thubron considered the book to be a "surreal masterpiece".

His second book The Oatmeal Ark (1997) followed, exploring immigrant dreams from Scotland and across Canada. It was nominated for the International Dublin Literary Award. When the chance arose to meet the Nobel Prize laureate Aung San Suu Kyi, MacLean travelled to Burma. Under the Dragon (1998) told the story of that country and won an Arts Council of England Writers' Award in 1997.

In Falling for Icarus (2004), MacLean moved to Crete to hand build—and fly once—a flying machine to come to terms with the death of his mother and to examine the relevance of Greek mythology to modern lives. In his book Magic Bus (2006), Maclean followed the many young Western people who in the 1960s and 1970s blazed the "hippie trail" from Istanbul to India. His seventh book, Missing Lives (2010, with photographer Nick Danziger), told the stories of fifteen people who went missing during the Yugoslav wars. His tenth book, Berlin: Imagine a City (2014), is a non-fiction history of the German capital.

When the 2018 Edinburgh International Book Festival commissioned The Freedom Papers from 51 writers to explore ideas related to freedom, Maclean wrote a bleak essay about daily life in North Korea being a "scripted performance". He read this on BBC Radio 4's Book of the Week strand.

== Humanitarian work ==
MacLean worked with photographer Nick Danziger on books Missing Lives (International Committee of the Red Cross, Geneva, 2010) and Beneath the Carob Trees (CMP, Nicosia, 2016) about the tens of thousands of Europeans who vanished in the Yugoslav Wars and the Cyprus conflict, and the use of DNA to enable the relatives of missing persons to recover the remains of their loved ones and so help to restore trust between communities. MacLean and Danziger also collaborated on Another Life (London: Unbound, 2017), following 15 impoverished families in eight countries over 15 years to examine the effect of the United Nations' Millennium Development Goals on lives lived on the edge, as well as British Council pluralism projects in Myanmar and North Korea.

== Works ==
- Stalin’s Nose (1992)
- The Oatmeal Ark (1997)
- Under the Dragon (1998)
- Next Exit Magic Kingdom (2000)
- Falling for Icarus (2004)
- Magic Bus (2006)
- Missing Lives (2010)
- Gift of Time (2011)
- Back in the USSR: Heroic Adventures in Transnistria (2014)
- Berlin: Imagine a City (2014)
- Wunderkind: Portraits of 50 Contemporary German Artists (2016)
- Beneath the Carob Trees: The Lost Lives of Cyprus (2016)
- Pictures of You: Ten Journeys in Time (2017)
- In North Korea: Lives and Lies in the State of Truth (2017)
- Pravda Ha Ha: Truth, Lies and the End of Europe (2019)
- Geography of Heaven: Travels to the Hereafter (2026)
