= Macklyn =

Macklyn is a surname and given name. Notable people with the name include:

- Macklyn Arbuckle (1866–1931), American screen and stage actor
- Macklyn Warlow, character in True Blood
- Allen Macklyn, character in Hands Across the Table
- Dr. Macklyn, character in Sick Abed

== See also ==
- Maclyn Goldman, American politician
- Maclyn McCarty, American scientist
