= Vancouver Film Studios =

Film production centre in Canada

Coordinates: 49.261°N 123.026°W

Vancouver Film Studios is a film movie facility animation production company located in Vancouver, British Columbia, Canada, and is operated by the McLean Group of Companies. It consists of 12 purpose-built sound stages ranging in size from 1,160 to 1,950 square metres (12,500 to 21,000 sq ft), eight production offices, and other support spaces. VFS in 2006 was the recipient of a BC Export Award in the New Media and Entertainment section, and was recognized as one of the top 21 exporters in British Columbia. It was founded in 1999.

Its films include Fifty Shades of Grey (2015), Step Up All In (2014), If I Stay (2014), and The Day the Earth Stood Still (2008). Television series produced include Fringe (2008–2013, 100 episodes), Bates Motel (2013–2017, 50 episodes), and Arrow (2012–2020, 167 episodes).

== History ==
The area of Boundary Road and Grandview Highway was first purchased by the McLean Group of Companies in the early 1980s. At the time businesses were located there included a gift centre, mattress factory, stonemason, commercial dry cleaner, bakery, electronics store, elevator test facility, tools wholesaler, and a cigarette company.

In 1987, Northstar International Studios was purchased, marking the beginning of film production for the company. Between 1987 and 1997 more buildings and land were purchased and dedicated to expanding the newly formed film production centre. In 1998 Northstar International Studios was renamed Vancouver Film Studios and six sound stages and supporting space begun construction.

The first structure was Building G completed in February 2000. In that time the entire production centre had 120,000 square metres (30 acres) dedicated to production, 10 sound stages, as well as other miscellaneous buildings. In March 2000, construction of Building J and Building C began, both were completed by July 2001. Construction for Building A began in November 2001 and opened for use in April 2002. With growing demand, two new structures—Building H and Building I—were ordered in December 2002 and opened in April 2003.

In June 2023, the studio was acquired by Hackman Capital Partners.

== Studios ==
Vancouver Film Studios has 12 purpose built sound stages and several other buildings dedicated to offices and various other support spaces.

- Building A - Two sound stages and offices. Located on a 7,300-square-metre (1.8-acre) site with the building measuring 2,586 m^{2} (27,840 sq ft). The two sound stages, Stage A1 and Stage A2, measure 1,160 m^{2} (12,500 sq ft) and 1,400 m^{2} (15,000 sq ft).
- Building B - Vancouver Film Studios Ltd. purchased the building in 1997. Originally the building was used to construct elevators by the Heede Crane Company, but became dedicated to film production shortly after being purchased. In 2001, the building was renovated to become production offices and two 1,400 m^{2} (15,000 sq ft) sound stages.
- Building C - Head office of Vancouver Film Studios and 16,700 square feet of production offices.
- Building D - In 1987 Building D was the beginning of the Vancouver Film Studios existing first as the Northstar International Studio. In 2012/2013 the building was torn down and redeveloped as 2,175 square feet of production offices and stage D1 with 21,000 square feet, and stage D2 at 15,000 square feet.
- Building E - Acquired in 1997, the building was renovated and currently has 13,650 square feet of production offices.
- Building F - Currently houses 13,190 square feet of offices and construction mill space.
- Building G - One of the original businesses, the Dynamex Courier warehouse, was demolished in 1999 for the construction of Building G. Its construction was completed in March 2000. It has 10,300 square feet of offices and stage G, 18,040 square feet.
- Buildings H & I - Originally a 2,250 m^{2} (24,200 sq ft) building on a 4,900-square-metre (1.2-acre) site located at 3625 East 11th Avenue, it was demolished in 2002 and replaced with two sound stages 1,400 m^{2} (15,000 sq ft) each).
- Building J - Originally a Costco parking lot, it was renovated in August 2001 to create 3 sound stages. J1, and J2 at 15,000 square feet each and J3 with 18,000 square feet.
- Building K - Located at 2727 Boundary Road, it houses 12,000 square feet of production offices and 3 separate construction mills.
- Building X - Home to Pacific Backlot Services, the grip and lighting company owned by the McLean Group.
