= Agnes McLean =

Scottish trade unionist and politician

- Born: 4 December 1918; Glasgow, Scotland, United Kingdom
- Died: 25 April 1994 (aged 75); Glasgow, Scotland
- Occupations: Trade unionist, bookbinder, crane driver
- Political party: Labour (after 1969); Communist Party of Great Britain

Agnes McLean (4 December 1918 – 25 April 1994) was a Scottish trade unionist and politician.

Born in the Ibrox area of Glasgow, McLean's family were committed socialists and supporters of John Maclean, her father being a member of the Scottish Workers' Republican Party, and she attended a Socialist Sunday School.

McLean began working at the age of fourteen, when she became a bookbinder at Collins publishing house. A union activist from the start, after working procedures were changed to speed up production, she successfully argued for the bookbinders to receive a raise. In 1939, she moved to work for Rolls-Royce in Hillington as a crane driver, and joined the Amalgamated Engineering Union (AEU). There, she campaigned for equal pay, leading a short strike in 1941, and a successful one in 1943.

McLean joined the Communist Party of Great Britain (CPGB) in 1942, coming to serve on its Scottish Committee and, later, on its National Committee. In 1954, she was elected to the executive of the AEU, the first woman to serve on the committee. She visited the Soviet Union in 1961 and said she was impressed. At this time, she was active in the peace movement, and was arrested at a sit-in protest at the Holy Loch Polaris base. She also travelled as a representative of the World Federation of Trade Unions, and was awarded the Gold Badge of the Trades Union Congress.

In 1969, McLean resigned from the CPGB, stating that "I felt the party was unable to convince people that they, the CP, were the party of the future, in spite of splendid work on behalf of workers in factories or unions". She soon joined the Labour Party and was elected for the party to Glasgow District Council. Following local government reorganisation, she became a councillor on Strathclyde Regional Council, representing the Glasgow Central and Calton ward. By the late 1970s, her mother was in poor health, and she left paid employment to look after her full-time, devoting much of her spare time to ballroom dancing. She also sat on several management committees, including those of Blindcraft Scotland, Scottish Opera, and the Theatre Royal, Glasgow.

McLean visited Cuba in 1993 to research the history of the rumba dance, this trip being made into a television programme, "In Cuba They're Still Dancing".
