= Willie McLanachan =

Scottish footballer

Personal information
- Full name: William Hugh McLanachan
- Date of birth: 13 January 1947 (age 79)
- Place of birth: Ayr, Scotland
- Position: Wing half

Youth career
- Kilmarnock Amateurs

Senior career*
| Years | Team | Apps | (Gls) |
| 1965–1971 | Queen's Park | 34 | (2) |

International career
| 1966–1970 | Scotland Amateurs | 4 | (0) |
- * Club domestic league appearances and goals

William Hugh McLanachan (born 13 January 1947) was a Scottish amateur football wing half who played in the Scottish League for Queen's Park. He was capped by Scotland at amateur level.
