= General McLane High School =

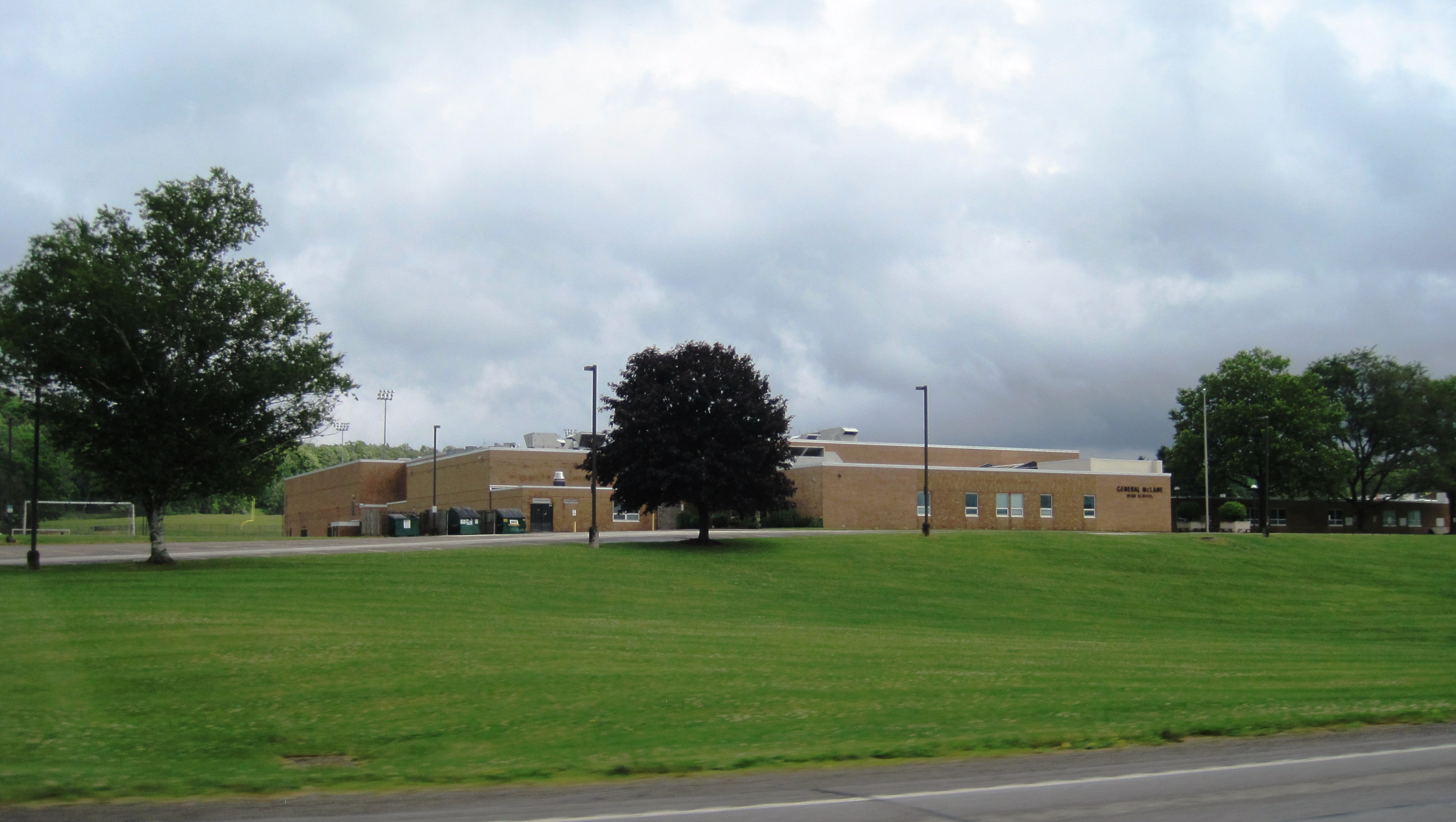

Location
- 11761 Edinboro Road; Edinboro, (Erie County), PA 16412; United States
- Coordinates: 41.917°N 80.123°W

Information
- Type: 9th–12th
- Established: 1959
- Superintendent: Matt Lane
- Head teacher: Daniel Mennow
- Teaching staff: 45.45 (FTE)
- Enrollment: 689 (2023–2024)
- Student to teacher ratio: 15.16
- Colors: Red and White
- Team name: Lancers
- Website: www.generalmclane.net/general-mclane-high-school/

General McLane High School serves students in grades nine through twelve in the General McLane School District. The school district consists of the towns of Edinboro and McKean and the areas including Washington Township, McKean Township and Franklin Township which surround the two towns.

The General McLane Lancers football and boys' basketball teams won their respective Pennsylvania Interscholastic Athletic Association (PIAA) Class AAA Championships during the 2006–2007 academic year, making GM the first Pennsylvania high school to win both titles in the same academic year. Also home of the GM Marching Band which won LMBA championships in 2001, 2002, 2004, 2006, 2007, and 2011-2013 and placed second in 2005, 2008, 2009, and 2010.

== History ==
General McLane High School completed construction in 1960 even though Colonel McLane was not promoted to Brigadier General until April 1961.
