= Stuart McLean (disambiguation) =

Stuart McLean, or a variation thereof, may refer to:

- Stuart McLean (1948–2017), Canadian broadcaster
- Stuart McLean (footballer) (born 1955), Scottish footballer
- Stewart McLean (politician) (1913–1996), Canadian politician
- Stewart McLean (actor) (1941–2006), Scottish actor
