= David McLean (historian) =

David A. McLean has been professor of history at King's College London since 1999. He joined King's in 1978 after having been a Draper's Research Fellow at Pembroke College, Cambridge since 1973. McLean received his BA from the University of Hull and his MA and Ph.D. from the University of Cambridge. McLean was visiting professor at Hiroshima Shudo University in 2002 and at Nihon University in 1985. His research interests include the economic and diplomatic history of modern Britain, educational development in nineteenth century British schools, and the history of medicine.

== Selected publications ==
- "Protecting wood and killing germs: 'Burnett's Liquid' and the origins of the preservative and disinfectant industries in early Victorian Britain", Business History, 52 (2), pp. 285–305.
- Surgeons of the Fleet: The Royal Navy and Its Medics from Trafalgar to Jutland, I.B.Tauris, 2010.
- Public Health and Politics in the Age of Reform: Cholera, the State and the Royal Navy in Victorian Britain. London: Palgrave Macmillan, 2006.
- "Surgeons of the Opium War: The Navy on the China Coast, 1840-42", English Historical Review, CXXI (491), pp. 487–504.
- Education and Empire: Naval Tradition and England's Elite Society. British Academic Press, 1998.
- War, Diplomacy and Informal Empire and the Republics of La Plata, 1836-1853. I.B.Tauris, 1994.
