= USS McLanahan (DD-264) =

Clemson-class destroyer

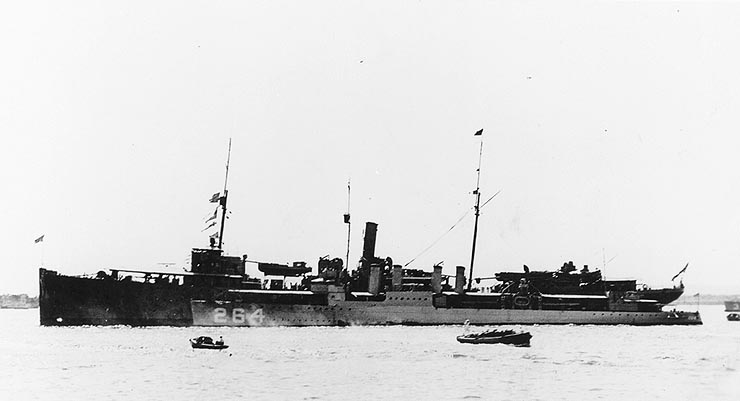
- USS McLanahan alongside USS Melville at San Diego, 1919

History

United States
- Name: USS McLanahan
- Namesake: Tenant McLanahan
- Builder: Bethlehem Shipbuilding Corporation, Squantum Victory Yard
- Laid down: 20 April 1918
- Launched: 22 September 1918
- Commissioned: 5 April 1919
- Decommissioned: 8 October 1940
- Identification: DD-264
- Fate: Transferred to United Kingdom, 8 October 1940

United Kingdom
- Name: HMS Bradford
- Acquired: 8 October 1940
- Commissioned: 8 October 1940
- Decommissioned: 3 May 1943
- Identification: Pennant number: H72
- Fate: Sold for scrap, 19 June 1946

General characteristics
- Class & type: Clemson-class destroyer
- Displacement: 1,215 tons
- Length: 314 ft 4 in (95.81 m)
- Beam: 31 ft 8 in (9.65 m)
- Draft: 9 ft 3 in (2.82 m)
- Propulsion: 26,500 shp (19,800 kW); geared turbines, 2 screws
- Speed: 35 kn (65 km/h; 40 mph)
- Range: 4,900 nmi (9,100 km; 5,600 mi) at 15 kn (28 km/h; 17 mph)
- Complement: 120 officers and enlisted
- Armament: 4 × 4 in (100 mm) guns; 2 × 3 in (76 mm) guns; 12 × 21 inch (533 mm) torpedo tubes

The first USS McLanahan (DD-264) was a Clemson-class destroyer in the United States Navy and transferred to the Royal Navy where she served as HMS Bradford (H72) during World War II.

== Design ==
The Clemson-class was a modified version of the previous Wickes class (itself a faster version of the Caldwell class) with more fuel, as many of the Wickes-class had poor fuel economy and hence endurance. Like the Wickes-class ships, the Clemsonss had flush-decks and four funnels and were ordered in very large numbers to meet the US Navy's need for ships to counter German U-boats as well as to operate with the fleet.

The Clemsons were 314 ft 4 in (95.81 m) long overall and 310 ft 0 in (94.49 m) at the waterline, with a beam of 30 ft 10 in (9.40 m) and a draft of 9 ft 10 in (3.00 m). Displacement was 1,190 long tons (1,209 t) normal and 1,308 long tons (1,329 t) full load. McLanahan had four Yarrow boilers that fed two sets of Curtis geared steam turbines. The machinery had a design rating of 27,000 shp (20,000 kW), giving a design speed of 35 kn (40 mph; 65 km/h). During sea trials, McLanahan reached a speed of 34.16 kn (39.31 mph; 63.26 km/h), with her machinery producing 27,050 shp (20,170 kW).

Main gun armament consisted of four 4 in (102 mm) /50 caliber guns, with one forward and one aft on the ship's centerline, and the remaining two on the ships beam. Anti-aircraft armament consisted of two 3"/23 caliber guns, while torpedo armament consisted of twelve 21 inch (533 mm) torpedo tubes, arranged in four triple mounts on the ship's beams.

== As USS McLanahan ==
Named for Tenant McLanahan, McLanahan was laid down on 20 April 1918 by the Bethlehem Shipbuilding Corporation's Victory Destroyer Plant in Squantum, Quincy, Massachusetts. The ship was launched on 22 September 1918; sponsored by Mrs. Charles M. Howe. The destroyer was accepted and commissioned on 5 April 1919.

After shakedown off the Massachusetts coast, and a cruise in European waters, McLanahan was assigned to the Pacific Fleet in October 1919, being based at San Diego, California. She was placed in reserve and decommissioned in June 1922. McLanahan was recommissioned at San Diego on 18 December 1939 and following overhaul and fitting out, was transferred on the East coast of the United States. On 8 October 1940 McLanahan was decommissioned as a U.S. Navy ship at Halifax, Nova Scotia, and was transferred to Britain under the commissioned in the Royal Navy, under the terms of the Destroyers for Bases Agreement. The destroyer commissioned as a Royal Navy ship the same day as HMS Bradford, with the pennant number H72.

== As HMS Bradford ==
After crossing the Atlantic, Bradford was refitted at Devonport dockyard, but after a number of defects were discovered during post-refit workup, it was decided to modify the ship as a long-range escort. The modification involved removal of the two forward boilers and substitution of additional fuel tanks. This improved endurance but reduced top speed to 25 kn (29 mph; 46 km/h). A new bridge was also fitted and two funnels removed.

Following completion of the conversion, Bradford joined the 43rd Escort Group in October 1941, escorting convoys between Britain and Gibraltar. On 18 April 1942, Bradford was involved in a collision with the sloop Scarborough, with Bradford being under repair on Humberside from June to August 1942. The destroyer escorted Convoy KMS 2, a follow-up convoy from Britain to Oran following the landings in North Africa for Operation Torch in October 1942.

In December 1942, Bradford underwent a period of repair at Liverpool, and in April 1943 was again sent to Liverpool for repair. On 3 May 1943 she was declared no longer fit for ocean escort work, and was paid off, and towed to Devonport where she served as an accommodation ship for Combined Services operations until the end of the war. The ship was transferred to British Iron & Steel Corporation for disposal on 19 June 1946 and arrived at Troon for scrapping by the West of Scotland Shipbreaking Company in August that year.
