= Daniel McLean (businessman) =

- Born: October 2, 1770; New Jersey
- Died: February 8, 1823; Alexandria, Virginia
- Occupation: Merchant
- Known for: Owner of "Old sugar house" and the first Vestryman at St Paul's Episcopal Church

Daniel McLean (MacLean or McClean) (October 2, 1770 in New Jersey – February 8, 1823 in Alexandria, Virginia) was a businessman in banking trade who owned one of the earliest sugar refineries in Alexandria, Virginia. He was also a chief benefactor of St. Paul's Episcopal Church in Alexandria, Virginia. McLean's father, Donald McLean, was born in Isle of Mull, Argyll, Scotland.

Daniel McLean married Lucretia Hodgkinson, daughter of Bethanath Hodgkinson and Catherine Zimmerman. Daniel and Lucretia McLean were the parents of several children, including Wilmer McLean whose house in Appomattox, Virginia the Civil-War Peace Treaty was signed under.

== Biography ==
After marrying, Daniel and his wife moved to Alexandria, Virginia, where Daniel established a bakery. They bought some property in the south side of Old Town. In 1804, Daniel was a vestry at Gen. George Washington's Christ Church, where Daniel owned the cemetery lot on the church's yard. It was not long and Daniel McLean became a well established businessman in Alexandria while owning one of the two sugar refineries in Alexandria, located on 111 - 123 North Alfred Street.

When Daniel died, his son-in-law, James D. Kerr, also of Scottish descent and who also had a business partnership with the McLeans, was the trustee of his estate. He later bought the Old Sugar House, where he and his family resided until 1847 when the house was finally auctioned. The refineries no longer exist.

On January 23, 1810, Daniel became the first vestry of the St. Paul's First Episcopal Church in Alexandria, Virginia. Because he gave a deed of life of his property on Fairfax Street to St Paul's Episcopal Church and paying St. Paul's Church debt, at the time some $3,500, his family pew was preserved inside St. Paul's Episcopal Church.

== Early Families of Alexandria, VA ==
Daniel and his wife, Lucretia McLean had several children, all born in Alexandria. Some died at young age before marrying while others married into other early families of the area.

- Samuel McLean (1797–1881) was the Consul for Trinidad de Cuba, marrying to the Smoot family first and later to the Williams family of Louisiana.
- Eliza McLean (1800–1854), the oldest daughter of the couple, married into the Alexander Family to whom the name of the city (Alexandria) was coined.
- Lucretia McLean (1802–1881) Married into the Kerr Family, a traditional family among old-Scottish family clans.
- Catherine McLean (1807–1859) married to the Hooe Family of the first mayor of the incorporated Alexandria---1779 (i.e. Robert Townsend Hooe's family).
- Hannah Agnes McLean (1810–1886) married to the Cleary Family
- Anthony McLean (1812–1893) worked for the Treasury Department having married to the Mackason family
- Wilmer McLean (1814–1882), of "The McLean Home" in Virginia's National Park at Appomattox, VA. married to the Hooe family related to his brother Samuel McLean's second wife. Wilmer was a US Federal Marshal during the US Federal Census for Fairfax County, VA, in 1850.

== See also ==
- Wilmer McLean
- Appomattox Court House
- First Battle of Bull Run
