= USS McLanahan (DD-615) =

Benson-class destroyer

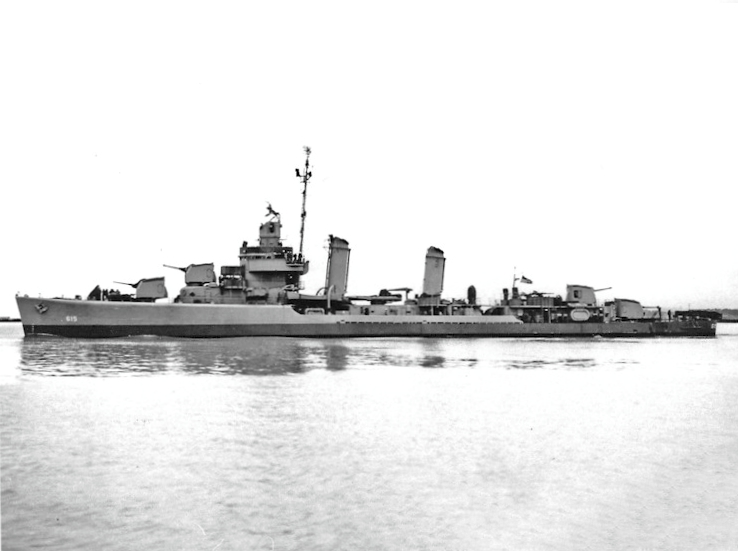
- USS McLanahan (DD-615) off the Mare Island Naval Shipyard on 5 February 1943

History

United States
- Name: USS McLanahan (DD-615)
- Namesake: Tenant McLanahan
- Builder: Bethlehem Shipbuilding, San Pedro, California
- Laid down: 29 May 1941
- Launched: 2 September 1942
- Commissioned: 19 December 1942
- Decommissioned: 2 February 1946
- Stricken: 1 July 1971
- Fate: Scrapped in 1974

General characteristics
- Class & type: Benson-class destroyer
- Displacement: 1,620 tons
- Length: 348 ft 4 in (106.17 m)
- Beam: 36 ft 1 in (11.00 m)
- Draft: 17 ft 4 in (5.28 m)
- Speed: 37.5 knots (69.5 km/h)
- Complement: 259
- Armament: 4 x5 in (130 mm)/38 guns, 4 x 20 mm., 5 x 21 inch (533 mm) tt., 6 dcp.

USS McLanahan (DD-615) was a Benson-class destroyer in the United States Navy during World War II. She was the second Navy ship named for Tenant McLanahan.

McLanahan was laid down 29 May 1941 by the Bethlehem Shipbuilding, San Pedro, California; launched 2 September 1942; sponsored by Mrs. Dorothy W. Howard; and commissioned 19 December 1942.

== Service history ==
McLanahan departed San Diego, California 19 February 1943 for assignment with Destroyer Squadron 16 (DesRon 16), Atlantic Fleet. She arrived at Norfolk, Virginia 10 March and, after additional training at Casco Bay, Maine, and several coastal convoys, departed on her first transatlantic convoy, to Algeria, 28 April. She returned to the east coast 8 June, departing again for North Africa on the 11th. The destroyer arrived at Oran 21 June to prepare for Operation Husky, the invasion of Sicily. From 6 to 15 July, she, with other units of Task Force 81 (TF 81), maintained an antisubmarine-antiaircraft screen to protect the invasion forces at Gela. She then returned to escort duties in the Mediterranean Sea and Atlantic.

During the next 9 months, her convoys suffered only three losses. In August 1943, Lieutenant Commander N. C. Johnson took command, and on 6 November, while en route to Naples from Oran, McLanahan's convoy was attacked by enemy aircraft which launched rocket bombs and torpedoes at the Allied ships. McLanahan escaped damage, but two merchantmen and one escort were lost. On 19 December 1943, a first birthday celebration was held for McLanahan in the Grand Ballroom of the St. George Hotel, Brooklyn, N.Y.

On 13 May 1944, she departed Oran for Naples to aid in the Anzio offensive. For the next month and a half she followed the advancing Allied lines up the Italian coast, providing gunfire support and ensuring the even flow of supplies. By the end of July, she had begun preparations for Operation Anvil, the invasion of southern France. She spent the first part of August off Sicily in amphibious exercises, sailing for the assault area on the 13th. By the 15th, she was in position providing fire support to the forces landing near St. Raphael. On the 18th, she joined the beachhead screen and, along the Italian and Sicilian coasts, protected the invasion forces and their supply lines from enemy aircraft and submarines. At the end of the month, she returned to Oran and continued on, a few days later, to New York, arriving there 14 September.

McLanahan returned to the Mediterranean 21 December and on 19 January 1945 joined "le Grande Garde" patrol in the bombardment of the Ligurian coast from Monte Carlo to Genoa. While off San Remo, 11 February, a large caliber projectile fired by a shore battery exploded 20 to 40 feet off her port quarter. Resultant damage included, in addition to one dead and eight severely wounded, numerous holes above and at the water line and one gun out of commission.

On 20 February, McLanahan departed for Oran. She returned to Toulon 21 March for an awards ceremony at which Rear Admiral P. Jaugard, French Navy, presented her captain, medical officer, and 12 other crewmembers with the Croix de Guerre. Her next assignment took her to Gibraltar, where, for the remainder of the war in Europe, the destroyer patrolled the Mediterranean approaches as far south as Casablanca. After the surrender at Reims, she cruised in the Tyrrhenian Sea and off north Africa and on 30 June sailed for Boston, arriving 8 July.

On 14 August, McLanahan departed Boston, Massachusetts for the Pacific war zone, but, with receipt of news of Japan's surrender, her orders were changed. She remained with the Atlantic Fleet, completing cruises to New York, New Orleans, Louisiana and Guantanamo Bay before mooring at Charleston, South Carolina, 3 November.

There she joined the Inactive Fleet and decommissioned 2 February 1946 and was berthed at Philadelphia, Pennsylvania. She was struck from the Naval Vessel Register on 1 July 1971 and scrapped in 1974.

== Awards ==
McLanahan earned four battle stars for World War II service.
