= McLean, West Virginia =

McLean
- Unincorporated community
- Location within the state of West Virginia McLean (the United States)
- Coordinates: 39°2′15″N 79°57′28″W
- Country: United States
- State: West Virginia
- County: Barbour
- Elevation: 1,703 ft (519 m)
- Time zone: UTC-5 (Eastern (EST))
  - Summer (DST): UTC-4 (EDT)
- GNIS ID: 1697119

McLean was an unincorporated community in Barbour County, West Virginia, United States.
