= Andrew Dyas MacLean =

Canadian naval officer, journalist, and publisher

Andrew Dyas MacLean (November 20, 1896 – January 22, 1971) was a Canadian naval officer, journalist, and publisher. His role in a controversy over Canadian naval operations in 1943, near the height of the Battle of the Atlantic, continues to be debated by Canadian naval historians. In 1943 MacLean's criticisms of the leadership of the Royal Canadian Navy, based on his personal experience and published in one of his magazines, led to questions in the House of Commons about the management of naval operations. Further investigations later that year eroded beyond repair the naval minister's confidence in Vice-Admiral Percy Nelles, until then chief of the Canadian naval staff, and Nelles was replaced early in 1944.

== Early years ==
Andrew MacLean was born in Toronto, the only child of Hugh Cameron MacLean and Elizabeth ('Bessie') Emma Matilda (née Dyas) MacLean. His mother died when he was six months old and he was raised by his maternal grandmother, Emma Ball Dyas. His grandfather, Thomas W. Dyas, was the advertising and circulations manager of The Toronto Mail and of the Toronto Empire, and a founder of A. McKim and Company, the first advertising agency in Canada. MacLean was educated at Appleby College, Upper Canada College, and University of Toronto Schools.

== The Maclean publishing enterprises ==
In the 1880s and 1890s, MacLean's father Hugh and uncle John Bayne Maclean — they adopted different spellings of their surname – worked together to build a substantial Canadian publishing enterprise. In 1899 J.B. Maclean bought out his brother and assumed full control of the Maclean Publishing Company, which later became Maclean-Hunter and then Rogers Communications. Hugh MacLean built a separate company, Hugh C. MacLean Publications, later part of Southam Publishing, then Canwest and then Postmedia News.

J.B. Maclean's son and heir Hector Andrew Fitzroy MacLean died in 1919, and he soon after proposed that Andrew MacLean, his nephew, succeed to a controlling interest in his publishing empire. Andrew MacLean, however, would make his business career with his father at Hugh C. MacLean Publications. Control of Maclean-Hunter eventually passed to Horace T. Hunter and other associates of J.B. Maclean, including Floyd Chalmers.

== Naval career and controversy ==
At the outbreak of the First World War, MacLean volunteered for service in the Royal Navy. After initial rejection because he was underage, he graduated from Royal Naval College, Greenwich in January 1917 and was commissioned as a sub-lieutenant R.N.V.R. He served in the Mediterranean with the First Submarine Hunting Flotilla. He was promoted on the recommendation of Admiral Sir David Beatty, 1st Earl Beatty and served on HMS Cleopatra, a fast cruiser that saw action in the North Sea with the Grand Fleet. He witnessed the German Navy's surrender at Scapa Flow. From 1927 to 1931, as a member of the Royal Canadian Naval Volunteer Reserve, he commanded the Toronto naval reserve station HMCS York.

At the outbreak of the Second World War, while awaiting call up as a Canadian reserve naval officer, the ever-patriotic MacLean joined the Royal Canadian Air Force RCAF and served in its Marine Section before returning to the Royal Canadian Navy. Sent on loan to the Royal Navy, he was given command of a convoy trawler, HMS St. Zeno. He later represented the admiralty for the acceptance trials of Fairmile submarine chasers and motor gun boats.

He was ordered back to Canada to organise RCN submarine chasers and became Senior Officer Fairmiles. Fairmiles, motor launches 34 metres long with a crew of about 15, were useful for coastal duties, but the ocean-going anti-submarine war was dominated by corvettes. MacLean campaigned for modernization and reorganization of the Fairmile fleet and, more generally, for better treatment of reserve officers like himself.

MacLean saw the careerism of some civil servants and senior officers as dereliction of duty. His frustration with the naval command led to his retirement from the Navy in October 1942, age 45. He returned to the family publishing business and subsequently made his concerns public in an issue of Boating Magazine. MacLean outlined his experience with the Fairmiles and argued that the expertise of patriotic and dedicated naval reserve personnel like himself was being dismissed by the small coterie of permanent force officers who dominated Canadian naval headquarters.

MacLean's blunt criticisms provoked questions in the Canadian Parliament and a rebuttal from the Minister of National Defence for naval services, Angus Lewis Macdonald.

The controversy over MacLean's charges was followed in the summer and fall of 1943 by confidential in-service criticisms from active duty officers, many of them reserve officers. These focussed on the outdated equipment and inadequate training of the RCN corvette fleet that was then engaged in transatlantic convoy duty and the anti-submarine campaign. The Naval Minister lost confidence in Vice-Admiral Percy C. Nelles, and he was removed as Chief of the Naval Staff in January 1944.

Nelles's strengths and weaknesses, and the degree to which MacLean's attack had eroded Minister Macdonald's confidence in the naval high command before the corvette officers' "equipment crisis," continue to be debated by Canadian scholars. MacLean is not mentioned in the official Operational History of the Royal Canadian Navy in the Second World War, but a critical account of his actions by historian Richard Mayne led in 2014-15 to publication of a defence of MacLean by his son, the author Rory MacLean, and a response by Mayne.

== Publishing career ==
Following the end of the First World War, MacLean joined Hugh C. MacLean Publishing and worked for the company for most of the next forty years. Between 1932 and 1934, he served as Secretary to Prime Minister R. B. Bennett and later published his reminiscences of Bennett.

MacLean became a director of Hugh C. MacLean Publishing in 1922 and president in 1947 after the death of his father. During that time he launched Canada's first photo tabloid newspaper, the Toronto News Mirror (1923–25). He later founded the Canadian Magazine. In addition, he was a director of the Muskoka Navigation & Hotel Company for many years.

In 1954, Hugh C. MacLean Publications built Canada's most modern printing plant in Don Mills. At the time, the firm's fifteen publications had a combined readership of 145,000. In 1961, following a family dispute, the board replaced MacLean as president. In 1964 the firm became part of Southam Business Publications.

== Later life ==
MacLean carried on the family publishing tradition under the name Andrew MacLean Limited. Based in Gravenhurst, Ontario, he published a number of weekly newspapers, including Muskoka News.

He married twice, and had five children: Hugh Armstrong MacLean, Hector Iain MacLean, author Rory MacLean, Andrew Howe MacLean and Marlie Anne MacLean.

MacLean died in Nassau, Bahamas.
