= Maclean, Queensland =

Maclean, Queensland may refer to two localities in Logan City, Queensland, Australia:

- North Maclean, Queensland
- South Maclean, Queensland

== See also ==
- Maclean, New South Wales
