= McLean Group of Companies =

The McLean Group of Companies Logo

McLean Group of Companies is collective of companies owned by the McLean family in Vancouver, British Columbia, Canada. The company's head offices are located in Vancouver and primarily invests in the development of real estate projects in North America. The company also has businesses in aviation. The aggregate value of the company's development projects are estimated at around US$1 billion. Among its most notably controlled companies is Blackcomb Helicopters.

== History ==
The McLean Group of Companies was founded by David McLean in 1972. The company originally started in real estate investment in the Vancouver area and later branched of to other places in Canada such as, Alberta, British Columbia, and Ontario. They also invest within the United States in states such as California, Georgia, Washington, and Hawaii.

In 30 years the company has operated, it has acquired and developed over 2,100 residential condominiums, apartments, and 200 acres (0.81 km^{2}) of urban land. In the 1980s the company purchased Northstar International Studios which later became Vancouver Film Studios.

== The Landing ==
Purchased by the McLean Group in the early 1980s, the same time as Vancouver Film Studios, The Landing is a 174,713 sq ft (16,231.4 m^{2}). building constructed in 1905 as a supply warehouse serving goldrush miners during the Klondike Gold Rush. The building is located in historic Gastown at 375 Water Street and was renovated and partly reconstructed in 1987 for safety reasons.

The Landing is one of many real estate companies the McLean Group owns. Other related companies are Erinmore Management, Blanca Realty, McLean & McLean, and Harbour Landing Construction.

== Blackcomb Helicopters ==
Blackcomb Helicopters, Ltd was founded in 1989 by Steve Flynn. The McLean group acquired the company in 2006. The company primarily participates in commercial operations in the tourism, film, and skiing industry around Whistler-Blackcomb. It is also contracted by the resort and government for fire fighting, rescue, and construction. Additionally, Blackcomb Helicopters, also known as Blackcomb Aviation has operational bases in Vancouver, Sechelt, Squamish and Pemberton making it the primary helicopter operator in the Sea to Sky region of British Columbia. The company is also one of the leading providers of helicopters to the Western Canadian film industry. Recent credits have included feature films such as The A-Team, Fantastic Four - Rise of the Silver Surfer, X-Files - I Want To Believe and Shooter.

== The McLean McCuaig Foundation ==
The McLean McCuaig Foundation is a charitable foundation of The McLean Group of Companies.
