= George Maclean (commissary general) =

Sir George Maclean KCB (1795-1861) was a Commissary General in the British Army. Born in Dysart, Fife, in 1795, George Maclean was the son of William Maclean, himself the son of George MacAllan, a Dysart Colliery manager.

George Maclean entered the commissariat department of the army in 1812. He received the War Medal with two Clasps for Orthes and Toulouse, both battles being in 1814. On 22 October 1816, he was promoted to Deputy Assistant Commissary General.

In about 1834, whilst serving in Nassau, Bahama Islands as an officer in the Commissariat Department, he was ordered to Sierra Leone as Assistant Commissary General of Stores, with his family moving to Dysart, the father's birthplace and family residence. After five years’ continuous service in Sierra Leone, he was promoted and posted to Hobart, Van Diemen's Land (Tasmania), at that time Great Britain's convict settlement, where among other matters, he was particularly concerned about the cost of mining coal and of the inefficient coal mining operation. On 23 Dec 1842 he was promoted to Deputy Commissary General.

British concerns at the perceived failure of the British commissariat and transport arrangements in the Crimea led to reviews of those of other nations, and Commissary General George Maclean examined the Austrian system, while a commission, under Major General Knollys, was sent to Paris to learn from the intendance.

George Maclean was initially appointed in charge of the arrangements in Constantinople, and subsequently succeeded William Filder as Commissary-General commanding the Commissariat in the East during the latter part of the siege of Sevastopol, for which he was awarded the Medal and Clasp. For his services during the Crimean War, he was appointed a K.C.B. He was also appointed to the Order of the Medjidie, 4th Class. (Constantinople) and Order of St. Maurice and St. Lazarus, Cross of Commander of the Second Class.

George Maclean also served in Spain, Canada and the Cape of Good Hope.

== Family ==
He married, first in 1818, a French lady, Mary Ann Ludin by whom he had one son.

He married, secondly 1826, Sarah Mary Lord, of Nassau, in the Bahamas, and had by her three sons and three daughters.

Major-Gen. Henry John Maclean, eldest son by his second wife, was born at Nassau in 1827, and entered the army in 1845. He took part in the Ashanti Wars (Ghana) and in the Crimean War as a Lieutenant Colonel. He was appointed, in 1878, to the headquarter staff in Ireland. He was placed on the retired list, with the rank of major-general, in 1884. He was married twice, and had five sons and three daughters. He named his residence in Beckenham, 'Ardgour', indicating a possible link to that family. He died in 1915.

Another son, John Lindsay MacLean, of Bath, was born on 23rd J October, 1830, at Nassau. He was posted to the 69th Regiment, and with it served abroad, first at Malta and then in the West Indies. He sold his Captain's commission and left the Army. He took his medical diploma at Edinburgh in 1861 'On epidemic yellow fever', married in 1863, (possibly a Miss Yapp). Dr Maclean then became a missionary.

Commissary General George Maclean died in 1861.
