= Samuel McLean (U.S. Consul) =

US Consul for Trinidad de Cuba (1797–1881)

- Born: Samuel McLean; September 12, 1797; Alexandria, Virginia
- Died: March 19, 1881; Philadelphia, Pennsylvania
- Occupation: Consul
- Employer: U. S. Department of State
- Known for: US Consul of Trinidad de Cuba

Samuel McLean (September 12, 1797 – March 19, 1881), was a United States Consul for Trinidad de Cuba from 1849 through 1855. He was appointed at Missouri.

== Family ==
He married Susan Wilson Smoot of the prominent Smoot Family of Alexandria. After she died he married a Mrs Johnson of Louisiana and removed after the American Civil War to Philadelphia.

Samuel had several children, including Alice Lawrason McLean, Lucretia Hodgkinson McLean, Alexander Kerr McLean and Virginia McLean with his first wife; and Lillie McLean, Eliza McLean and Archie McLean, with his second wife.

== Death ==
He died in Philadelphia, Pennsylvania, on March 19, 1881. He was buried in Alexandria.

== See also ==
- Daniel McLean, Samuel's father
- Wilmer McLean, Samuel's brother
