= MacLaine =

MacLaine or Maclaine (Gaelic: Mac Gill-Eain) is a surname of Scottish origin. It may refer to:

Persons

- Christopher Maclaine (1923–1975), American poet and filmmaker
- Gillean Maclaine (1921–1970), Scottish chief of Clan Maclaine of Lochbuie
- James MacLaine (1724–1750), Irish highwayman
- Mark Maclaine (contemporary), English musician
- Sarah Maclaine, Australian jazz singer
- Shirley MacLaine (born 1934), American actress

Scottish clan

- Clan Maclaine of Lochbuie

Fictional persons

- Jake Maclaine, character from the American soap opera The Bold and the Beautiful
- Mark Maclaine (The Bold and the Beautiful), character from the American soap opera The Bold and the Beautiful

== See also ==
- Clan Maclean
- McLaine
- McClain (disambiguation)
- MacLean (disambiguation)
- McLane (disambiguation)
