= McLain =

McLain is a surname. Notable people with the surname include:

- Carrie M. McLain (1895–1973), American writer, teacher
- Denny McLain (born 1944), American baseball player
- Ellen McLain (born 1952), American voice actor
- Frank A. McLain (1852–1920), American politician
- Hardy McLain (born 1952), American hedge fund manager
- Jeremiah McLain Rusk (1830–1893), American politician, 15th governor of the state of Wisconsin
- Masey McLain (born 1994), American actress
- Matt McLain (born 1999), American baseball player
- Mitch McLain (born 1993), American hockey player
- Raymond S. McLain (1890–1954), American military general
- Tommy McLain (1940–2025), American singer

Fictional characters:

- Ember McLain, character from the animated series Danny Phantom

== Other possible meanings ==
- McLain, Mississippi, United States
- McLain State Park, Michigan
- Big Jim McLain, a 1952 film starring John Wayne.
- Clan MacLaine of Lochbuie, a highland Scottish clan.

== See also ==
- McLean (disambiguation)
- McLaine
