= Archibald MacLean =

British military officer (1883–1970)

Archibald Campbell Holms MacLean
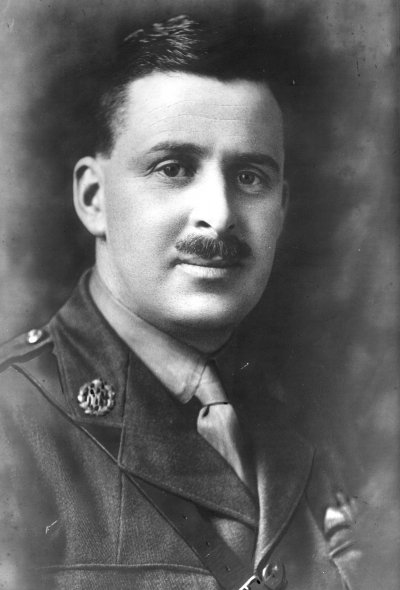
- MacLean in Royal Flying Corps uniform
- Born: 23 October 1883
- Died: 30 April 1970 (aged 86)
- Military career
- Allegiance: United Kingdom
- Branch: British Army; Royal Air Force
- Service years: 1903–25; 1939–42
- Rank: Brigadier general
- Commands: Central Flying School (1916–17); No. 8 Squadron RFC (1915–16); No. 5 Squadron RFC (1914–15)
- Conflicts: First World War; Second World War
- Awards: Commander of the Order of the British Empire; Mentioned in dispatches Order of the Rising Sun, 3rd Class (Japan)

Archibald Campbell Holms MacLean, CBE (23 October 1883 – 30 April 1970) was an officer in the Royal Scots, Royal Flying Corps and Royal Air Force. MacLean attended the Royal Military College, Sandhurst, before he was commissioned into the Royal Scots. He transferred to the Royal Flying Corps in 1913 and during the First World War served as a squadron leader and wing commander before taking up senior training and staff appointments. In April 1918 he transferred to the newly formed Royal Air Force and was subsequently promoted to brigadier general just after the end of the First World War.

== First World War ==
When the First World War began, MacLean was an instructor at the Central Flying School, holding the rank of captain. However, just a few months later, in November 1914, he was promoted to major and appointed Officer Commanding No. 5 Squadron. Under a year later in August 1915, MacLean took up command of No. 8 Squadron and in 1916 he became the Commandant of the Central Flying School. In November 1917, MacLean departed the Central Flying School for another training role, this time as Commandant of the Armament School. At the same time MacLean was promoted to colonel.

With the establishment of the Royal Air Force on 1 April 1918, MacLean became one of the new Service's senior officers. Just after the close of the Great War, MacLean was appointed brigadier general responsible for administration at the headquarters of the RAF's South-Eastern Area. MacLean only held the rank of brigadier general in an acting capacity, and in August 1919, when the Royal Air Force introduced its own rank titles, he was re-graded to the lower rank of wing commander. MacLean relinquished his RAF commission three months later in November 1919.

== Second World War ==
Following the outbreak of the Second World War, MacLean was recalled to service and granted a commission in the Administrative and Special Duties Branch of the Reserve of Air Force Officers as a pilot officer. In the latter part of 1942, MacLean served on the air staff at the Air Headquarters Bengal before finally retiring for the last time on 14 December 1942.

Military offices
Preceded by John Higgins	Officer Commanding No. 5 Squadron; 1914–1915	Unknown
Preceded by Lionel Charlton	Officer Commanding No. 8 Squadron; 1915–1916	Unknown
Preceded by Charles Burke	Commandant of the Central Flying School; 1916–1917	Succeeded by Alan Scott
