= List of shipwrecks in October 1861 =

The list of shipwrecks in October 1861 includes ships sunk, foundered, grounded, or otherwise lost during October 1861.

== 1 October ==
List of shipwrecks: 1 October 1861
Ship	State	Description
Flora	France	The ship foundered in the North Sea. Her crew were rescued. She was on a voyage from Memel, Prussia to Dunkirk, Nord.
Good Intent	United Kingdom	The paddle tug collided with the paddle tug Harry Clasper (United Kingdom) in the River Tyne and was beached in a sinking condition.
Infernal	French Navy	The frigate was destroyed by fire at Valparaíso, Chile.
Nereous	United Kingdom	The storeship was severely damaged by fire at Valparaíso.
Salem	United States	The ship was abandoned in the Atlantic Ocean. Her crew were rescued by Mischief ( (United Kingdom of Great Britain and Ireland) Guernsey). Salem was on a voyage from Quebec City, Province of Canada, British North America to Belfast, County Antrim, United Kingdom. She was discovered off Guernsey, Channel Islands on 14 January 1862 and was taken in to by the steamship Nora Creina (United Kingdom), but the tow had to be abandoned.
Two unidentified schooners	United States	Loaded with stone, the two schooners were sunk by a storm off the coast of North Carolina while en route to Hatteras Inlet, where they would have been scuttled as blockships.

== 2 October ==
List of shipwrecks: 2 October 1861
Ship	State	Description
Johanna	Stettin	The ship was abandoned in the North Sea. Her crew were rescued. She was on a voyage from Grangemouth, Stirlingshire, United Kingdom to Stettin.
William Brown	United Kingdom	The ship caught fire in the Atlantic Ocean and was abandoned with the loss of one life. Survivors were rescued by Hedwig Charlotta (Sweden). William Brown was on a voyage from London to New Plymouth, New Zealand.

== 3 October ==
List of shipwrecks: 3 October 1861
Ship	State	Description
Emerald	United Kingdom	The steamship was driven ashore at Waterloo, Lancashire. She was on a voyage from Liverpool, Lancashire to Dublin. She was refloated and resumed her voyage.
Forest Queen	United Kingdom	The ship collided with Liffey (United Kingdom) and foundered in the English Channel 30 nautical miles (56 km) off The Lizard, Cornwall. Her crew were rescued by Liffey.
Reindeer	Confederate States of America	American Civil War, Union blockade: The 4-ton schooner, bound for Galveston, Texas.with a cargo of salt, was captured and scuttled off San Luis Pass on the coast of Texas by the armed schooners USS Dart and USS Sam Houston (both United States Navy).
Winged Racer	United States	The clipper struck a sunken rock off Alcatraz Island, California and was holed. She was on a voyage from San Francisco, California to Liverpool, Lancashire. She put back to San Francisco in a leaky condition. Subsequently repaired at Mare Island Navy Yard and returned to service.

== 4 October ==
List of shipwrecks: 4 October 1861
Ship	State	Description
Alice	United Kingdom	The barque was driven ashore and wrecked on "Leon Island", Argentina. Her crew were rescued.
Minerva	United Kingdom	The ship was driven ashore at Dartmouth, Devon. She was refloated and put back to Dartmouth.
Nereid, and Semaphore	United Kingdom	The brig Nereid ran into with the steamship Semaphore and sank in the Irish Sea 5 nautical miles (9.3 km) off the Calf of Man, Isle of Man. Her seven crew were rescued by Semaphore. She was on a voyage from Whitehaven, Cumberland to Cardiff, Glamorgan. Semaphore was on a voyage from Liverpool, Lancashire to Belfast, County Antrim. She was severely damaged at the bows and was beached at Donaghadee, County Down. Her passengers were taken off by the tug Queen (United Kingdom).
Weardale	United Kingdom	The brig was driven ashore on Skagen, Denmark. She was on a voyage from Arbroath, Forfarshire to Copenhagen, Denmark. She was refloated on 6 October and taken in to Copenhagen.

== 5 October ==
List of shipwrecks: 5 October 1861
Ship	State	Description
Alice	United Kingdom	The Mersey Flat collided with a tug and sank in the River Mersey with the loss of one of her two crew.
Britannia	United Kingdom	The steamship was driven ashore at Höganäs, Sweden. She was on a voyage from Hull, Yorkshire to Stettin. She was refloated the next day.
General Havelock	United Kingdom	The brig collided with the brig Ocean Wave (United Kingdom) and sank 70 nautical miles (130 km) south east of the Isles of Scilly. Her fourteen crew were rescued by Ocean Wave. General Havelock was on a voyage from Newport, Monmouthshire to Málaga, Spain.
Martha Mills	United Kingdom	The barque was run down and sunk by the steamship Corinthian (flag unknown) 60 nautical miles (110 km) north west of Malta. Her crew were rescued by Corinthian. Martha Mills was on a voyage from Liverpool, Lancashire to Constantinople, Ottoman Empire.
New Hope	United Kingdom	The smack was driven ashore and wrecked at Fishguard, Pembrokeshire. She was on a voyage from Port Madoc, Caernarfonshire to Newport, Monmouthshire.
CSS Venus	Confederate States Navy	American Civil War, Battle of Cockle Creek: The Confederate privateer, a schooner, was boarded and set afire in Chincoteague Inlet off the coast of Virginia near Cockle Creek by men from the armed screw steamer USS Louisiana (United States Navy). Venus burned to the waterline.

== 6 October ==
List of shipwrecks: 6 October 1861
Ship	State	Description
Peace	United Kingdom	The lugger collided with the fishing vessel Johns (United Kingdom) and sank in the North Sea. Her crew were rescued.

== 7 October ==
List of shipwrecks: 7 October 1861
Ship	State	Description
Brunette	United Kingdom	The schooner was driven ashore at Indian Key, Florida, Confederate States of America. She was on a voyage from New York, United States to Matanzas, Cuba. She was refloated and taken in to Key West, Florida in a severely damaged condition.
Cambridge	United Kingdom	The ship was driven ashore at Walmer Castle, Kent. She was on a voyage from Sunderland, County Durham to Portsmouth, Hampshire.
Emily	United Kingdom	The brigantine was driven ashore at Castletownbere, County Cork. Her crew were rescued. She was on a voyage from Cork to Miramichi, New Brunswick, British North America. She was refloated and taken in to Berehaven, County Cork in a severely damaged condition, with a broken back.
Georgiana	United Kingdom	The ship was driven ashore at Walmer Castle. She was on a voyage from South Shields, County Durham to Waterford.
Scotia	United Kingdom	The schooner ran aground on the Stotfield Skerries, in the Moray Firth. She was refloated and resumed her voyage.

== 8 October ==
List of shipwrecks: 8 October 1861
Ship	State	Description
Alert	United States	The barque sprang a leak and sank off Lundy Island, Devon, United Kingdom. All thirteen people on board were rescued by the pilot boat No. 33 (United Kingdom). Alert was on a voyage from New York to a Mediterranean port.
Clara	Netherlands	The schooner capsized and sank in the Gulf of Venezuela with the loss of 28 of the 36 people on board. She was on a voyage from Maracaibo, Venezuela to Curaçao.
Dolphin	(United Kingdom of Great Britain and Ireland) British North America	The ship was destroyed by fire at Halifax, Nova Scotia. Her crew were rescued.
E. M. Ryland	United States	The 267-ton sidewheel paddle steamer burned on the Mississippi River at St. Louis, Missouri.
Hector	Denmark	The schooner ran aground on the Old Horse Rock, off the coast of Yorkshire, United Kingdom. She was on a voyage from Copenhagen to Hartlepool, County Durham, United Kingdom. She was refloated and taken in to Scarborough, Yorkshire.
Patras	United Kingdom	The steamship ran aground on the Bredegrunden. She was on a voyage from Königsberg, Kingdom of Prussia to Antwerp, Belgium.

== 9 October ==
List of shipwrecks: 9 October 1861
Ship	State	Description
John Booth	United Kingdom	The smack was driven ashore and wrecked at Bude, Cornwall. Both crew were rescued by rocket apparatus, but a Coastguardman was killed effecting the rescue. She was on a voyage from Porthcawl, Glamorgan to Bude.
Vesta	United Kingdom	The ship was driven ashore on Öland, Sweden. She was on a voyage from Kronstadt, Russia to Dunkirk, Nord, France.

== 10 October ==
List of shipwrecks: 10 October 1861
Ship	State	Description
Amazone	Prussia	The barque was driven ashore and wrecked at Souter Point, Northumberland, United Kingdom. Her crew were rescued. She was on a voyage from Havre de Grâce, Seine-Inférieure, France to the River Tyne - This may be the unidentified Mecklenburg barque listed under 11 October, as she was in tow of a tug, which was reported wrecked. Amazone was refloated on 18 October and taken in to Sunderland, County Durham, United Kingdom.
Due Sorrelle	Italy	The brig was driven ashore on the coast of Yorkshire, United Kingdom. She was on a voyage from Middlesbrough, Yorkshire to Genoa. She was refloated and resumed her voyage.
Mariners	United Kingdom	The brig ran aground on the Pickle Sand, in the North Sea off the coast of Norfolk. She was on a voyage from South Shields, County Durham to Havre de Grâce, Seine-Inférieure, France.
Meta Catharina	Denmark	The schooner was driven ashore near Leba, Prussia. Her five crew survived. Meta Catharina was on a voyage from Newcastle upon Tyne, Northumberland, United Kingdom to Königsberg, Prussia. She subsequently sank.
St. Michael	United Kingdom	The sloop was driven ashore at Dingle, County Kerry. She was on a voyage from Tralee, County Kerry to "Catterwalla". She was refloated the next day and taken in to Dingle.
Unnamed	United States	The ship was wrecked at the mouth of the Danube near Sulina, Ottoman Empire. Eleven crew were rescued.

== 11 October ==
List of shipwrecks: 11 October 1861
Ship	State	Description
Amazone	Hamburg	The barque ran aground on the Long Sand, in the North Sea off the coast of Essex, United Kingdom. She was on a voyage from Newcastle upon Tyne, Northumberland, United Kingdom to Shanghai, China. She was refloated and towed in to the River Thames for repairs.
Drie Gezusters	Netherlands	The ship ran aground near Fredrikshavn, Denmark. She was on a voyage from Newcastle upon Tyne to Rørvig, Denmark. She was refloated and taken in to Fredrikshavn in a severely leaky condition.
Earl of Seafield	United Kingdom	The ship was driven ashore and wrecked at Donmouth, Aberdeenshire. Her crew were rescued. She was on a voyage from Blyth, Northumberland to Aberdeen.
Lord Raglan	United Kingdom	The steamship was driven ashore at Hellevoetsluis, Zeeland, Netherlands. She was refloated on 14 October.
Martha Washington	Confederate States of America	American Civil War, Union blockade: The schooner was burned at Dumfries, Virginia, by launches from the armed screw steamers USS Rescue, USS Resolute, and USS Union and the armed tug USS Satellite (all United States Navy).
Paragon	United Kingdom	The brig was driven ashore at Farther Point, in the Saint Lawrence River. She was on a voyage from Bridgwater, Somerset to Quebec City, Province of Canada, British North America. She was later refloated and resumed her voyage, arriving at Quebec City on 2 November.
Robert Pow, and an Unnamed barque	United Kingdom; Grand Duchy of Mecklenburg-Schwerin	The paddle tug Robert Pow was towing a barque. Both were driven ashore at Souter Point, Northumberland. Robert Pow's crew survived. Reported to have been wrecked, she was subsequently refloated, repaired and returned to service.
USS South Wind	United States	American Civil War, Union blockade: The schooner was scuttled as a blockship – part of the "Stone Fleet" – in Ocracoke Inlet off North Carolina.
Unidentified schooner	Confederate States of America	American Civil War, Union blockade: Boat crews from the armed screw steamers USS Rescue and USS Union and the armed tug USS Resolute (all United States Navy) captured and burned the schooner in Quantico Creek in Virginia.

== 12 October ==
List of shipwrecks: 12 October 1861
Ship	State	Description
Der Fleiss	Prussia	The brig ran aground and sank at Sunderland, County Durham, United Kingdom. She was on a voyage from Sunderland to Stettin. She was refloated on 20 October.
Elizabeth	United Kingdom	The schooner sank off Belfast, County Antrim.
Kate Seymour	United Kingdom	The ship ran aground on the Goodwin Sands, Kent. She was on a voyage from London to Havre de Grâce, Seine-Inférieure, France. She was refloated.
Lady Egida	United Kingdom	The ship ran aground on the Pluckington Bank, in Liverpool Bay. She was refloated and taken in to Liverpool, Lancashire.
Martha Grace	United Kingdom	The ship was wrecked. Her crew were rescued. She was on a voyage from Maryport, Cumberland to Dublin.
Newport	United Kingdom	The schooner was driven ashore and wrecked 2 nautical miles (3.7 km) south of Montrose, Forfarshire. Her crew were rescued. She was on a voyage from Aberdeen to Sunderland.
USS Richmond	United States Navy	American Civil War, Battle of the Head of Passes: The screw sloop-of-war ran aground on a sandbar on the Mississippi River in Louisiana below the Head of Passes after being rammed by the ram CSS Manassas (Confederate States Navy) at the Head of Passes. She was refloated and returned to service.
USS Vincennes	United States Navy	American Civil War, Battle of the Head of Passes: The sloop-of-war was forced to run aground on a sandbar on the Mississippi River in Louisiana below Head of Passes by the ram CSS Manassas (Confederate States Navy) at the Head of Passes. Her commanding officer ordered her magazine detonated to prevent her capture by Confederate forces, but her engineer, after lighting a fuse intended to detonate it, cut the burning fuse and threw it overboard. She was refloated later in the day and returned to service.
Stag Hound	United States	The extreme clipper was destroyed by fire in the Atlantic Ocean 45 nautical miles (83 km) south of Pernambuco, Brazil. Her crew survived. She was on a voyage from Sunderland to San Francisco, California.

== 13 October ==
List of shipwrecks: 13 October 1861
Ship	State	Description
Comte Nesselrode	Italy	The ship ran aground on the Stoney Binks, off the mouth of the Humber and was abandoned by her crew, some of whom were rescued by the steamship Albert (France). Others got on to the Bull Float, from where they were rescued. Comte Nesselrode was on a voyage from Odesa to Hull, Yorkshire, United Kingdom. She floated off and came ashore at South Killingholme, Lincolnshire, United Kingdom. She was subsequently taken in to Hull.
Gratitude	United Kingdom	The schooner ran aground on the East Scar Rock, off the coast of Yorkshire. She was on a voyage from Great Yarmouth, Norfolk to Newcastle upon Tyne, Northumberland. She was refloated and taken in to Hartlepool, County Durham.
London Packet	United Kingdom	The brig sprang a leak and was beached at Grimsby, Lincolnshire. She was on a voyage from West Hartlepool, County Durham to Sandwich, Kent. She was refloated the next day and taken in to Grimsby.
Venetia	United Kingdom	The ship foundered in the Atlantic Ocean. Her crew were rescued. She was on a voyage from Cardiff, Glamorgan to Trieste.
Wave	(United Kingdom of Great Britain and Ireland) Guernsey	The schooner was driven ashore and wrecked at Holyhead, Anglesey. Her crew survived.

== 14 October ==
List of shipwrecks: 14 October 1861
Ship	State	Description
Faust	Hamburg	The ship was wrecked at Hong Kong with the loss of all but one of her crew.
H. H. Chandler	United Kingdom	The ship foundered in the South China Sea. Her crew were rescued by HMS Simoom (Royal Navy).
Mary Fleming	United Kingdom	The ship ran aground off Escombreras, Spain. She was on a voyage from Newcastle upon Tyne, Northumberland to Cartagena, Spain.
Oliver Williams	United Kingdom	The ship was driven ashore at Bic, Province of Canada, British North America. She was on a voyage from Liverpool, Lancashire to Quebec City, Province of Canada.
Swan	United Kingdom	The ship was wrecked in "Tongsang Harbour", China.

== 15 October ==
List of shipwrecks: 15 October 1861
Ship	State	Description
Bale Eagle	United States	The clipper departed from Hong Kong for San Francisco, California. No further trace, presumed foundered with the loss of all hands.
Jane and Isabella	United Kingdom	The brig ran aground on the Holm Sand, in the North Sea off the coast of Suffolk. She was on a voyage from Sunderland, County Durham to London. She was refloated the next day and resumed her voyage.
Siccardi	Italy	The brig was run into by the steamship Fingal (United Kingdom) and sank at Holyhead, Anglesey, United Kingdom. Her crew were rescued by Fingal.
Thomas Watson	United Kingdom	American Civil War, Union blockade: Bound from London to Wilmington, North Carolina, Confederate States of America with a cargo of salt, blankets, flannels, and other dry goods, the sailing ship ran aground on the coast of South Carolina on the northeastern side of Stono Reef. Her crew abandoned her. The screw frigate USS Roanoke (United States Navy) captured her wreck, and Eby (United States) burned her.
W. H. Chandler	United Kingdom	The barque foundered in the Formosa Channel. Her crew were rescued by HMS Simoom (Royal Navy).
Two unidentified schooners	Unknown	The two schooners were lost in a storm while tied up at a wharf in Galveston, Texas.

== 16 October ==
List of shipwrecks: 16 October 1861
Ship	State	Description
Gratitude	United Kingdom	The barque was driven ashore and wrecked on Hogland, Russia. Her crew were rescued. She was on a voyage from Kronstadt, Russia to London.
Marco Bozzario	United Kingdom	The steamship foundered in the Mediterranean Sea 200 nautical miles (370 km) east of Malta. Her crew were rescued by Leif (Norway). Marco Bozzario was on a voyage form Sulina, Ottoman Empire to Livorno, Italy.
Rose	United Kingdom	The barque sprang a leak and was beached at Stornoway, Isle of Lewis, Outer Hebrides.
Water Nymph	United Kingdom	The collier, a brig, collided with the steam collier Jarrow (United Kingdom) in the River Thames and was beached at Gravesend, Kent.
Unnamed	United Kingdom	The schooner collided with Ravenshill (United Kingdom) and sank off the Smalls Lighthouse with the loss of all hands.

== 17 October ==
List of shipwrecks: 17 October 1861
Ship	State	Description
Change	United Kingdom	The barque was wrecked on the Portneuf Shoal, in the Saint Lawrence River. She was on a voyage from Hartlepool, County Durham to Quebec City, Province of Canada, British North America.
Florence	United Kingdom	The ship was wrecked on the Portneuf Shoal. She was on a voyage from Glasgow, Renfrewshire to Quebec City.
Harvest Queen	United Kingdom	The ship ran aground in the River Mersey. She was on a voyage from Liverpool, Lancashire to Genoa, Italy.
Loncomilla	Chile	The ship was wrecked at Constitución.

== 18 October ==
List of shipwrecks: 18 October 1861
Ship	State	Description
Frolic	United States	American Civil War: After being driven out to sea and losing all of her sails overnight, the tender ran aground at Southwest Pass at the mouth of the Mississippi River on the coast of Louisiana. She was stripped and burned by the gunboat USS South Carolina (United States Navy) to prevent her capture by Confederate forces.
Hector	United Kingdom	The brig ran aground on the Middelgrunden. She was on a voyage from Whitby, Yorkshire to Danzig. She was refloated the next day.
John Miller	United Kingdom	The ship foundered off the Welsh coast. Her crew were rescued. She was on a voyage from Dublin to Hull, Yorkshire and Antwerp, Belgium.
Josephina	Sweden	The galeas was driven ashore and wrecked near Halmstad. Her crew were rescued. She was on a voyage from Newcastle upon Tyne, Northumberland, United Kingdom to Lysekil.

== 19 October ==
List of shipwrecks: 19 October 1861
Ship	State	Description
Brigadier	United Kingdom	The steamship struck the quayside at Newcastle upon Tyne, Northumberland and was severely damaged, sinking at the bow. She was on a voyage from Hamburg to Newcastle upon Tyne.
Maria Hardy	United Kingdom	The brig capsized at a port near Brest, Finistère, France.
Pearl	United Kingdom	The ship was lost near Augusta, Sicily, Italy with the loss of all but two of her crew. She was on a voyage from Messina to Catania, Sicily.

== 20 October ==
List of shipwrecks: 20 October 1861
Ship	State	Description
Bee	United Kingdom	The schooner was driven ashore on Damsay, Orkney Islands. She was refloated the next day.

== 21 October ==
List of shipwrecks: 21 October 1861
Ship	State	Description
Galioteer	United Kingdom	The ship sprang a leak and foundered in the North Sea off Spurn Point, Yorkshire. Her crew were rescued by Pearl (United Kingdom). Galioteer was on a voyage from Sunderland, County Durham to Lowestoft, Suffolk.
Lady Jane	(United Kingdom of Great Britain and Ireland) British North America	The schooner struck a sunken wreck and was beached at Crole's Head, Nova Scotia. She was on a voyage from Cape Breton Island to Halifax, Nova Scotia.

== 22 October ==
List of shipwrecks: 22 October 1861
Ship	State	Description
Comte Derlon	France	The steamship struck the Barges Rocks and was abandoned by her passengers and crew, who were rescued by a coaster. She was on a voyage from Nantes, Loire-Inférieure to Bordeaux, Gironde. She capsized on 24 October 4 nautical miles (7.4 km) north west of Les Sables d'Olonne, Vendée.
Earl of Derby	United Kingdom	The wasterlogged ship ran aground in Loch Indaal. She was on a voyage from Greenock, Renfrewshire to Quebec City, Province of Canada, British North America. She was refloated on 30 October and towed in to Greenock.
Fanny	United Kingdom	The barque was destroyed by fire in the South Atlantic (2°54′S 26°30′W). Her crew were rescued by the barque Ascendant (United Kingdom). Fanny was on a voyage from Swansea, Glamorgan to Valparaíso, Chile.
Galatea	United Kingdom	The ship foundered off Spurn Point, Yorkshire. Her crew survived. She was on a voyage from Sunderland, County Durham to Lowestoft, Suffolk.
Hilda	United Kingdom	The ship was driven ashore and wrecked near Nordmaling, Sweden with the loss of two of her crew.
John Libau	United States	The ship was wrecked in the Strait of Belle Isle. Her five crew survived.
HMS Virago	Royal Navy	The Driver-class sloop ran aground in the East Swin, in the Thames Estuary. She was subsequently refloated, repaired and returned to service.

== 23 October ==
List of shipwrecks: 23 October 1861
Ship	State	Description
Adelaide	United Kingdom	The ship was wrecked at Messina, Sicily, Italy.
Norichael	Greece	The brig was wrecked at Messina.
Nuova Immaculata	Italy	The ship was wrecked at Messina.
Popplewell	United Kingdom	The schooner was abandoned in the Irish Sea off Lambay Island, County Dublin. Her crew were rescued by Monita (Flag unknown). Popplewell was on a voyage from Chester, Cheshire to Newry, County Antrim.
CSS Tuscarora	Confederate States Navy	The sidewheel gunboat caught fire and was run ashore on the bank of the Mississippi River near Herbert's Plantation, 15 miles (24 km) below Memphis, Tennessee. Her ammunition magazine exploded seven minutes later, destroying her and setting the plantation′s slave quarters on fire. Her crew were rescued.

== 24 October ==
List of shipwrecks: 24 October 1861
Ship	State	Description
Ancient Mariner	United Kingdom	The ship foundered in the Atlantic Ocean off Cape Rosier, Maine, United States with the loss of fifteen of her eighteen crew. She was on a voyage from Montreal, Province of Canada, British North America to London.
Ant	United Kingdom	The ship was driven ashore in Sandown Bay. She was on a voyage from Stockton-on-Tees, County Durham to Falmouth, Cornwall. She was refloated on 3 November with assistance from HMS Echo (Royal Navy) but sank.
Minerva	United Kingdom	The ship sprang a leak and foundered in the English Channel 10 nautical miles (19 km) off the Isle of Wight. Her crew were rescued by John (United Kingdom). Minerva was on a voyage from Guernsey, Channel Islands to London.
Prince of the Seas	United Kingdom	The clipper was destroyed by fire at Melbourne, Victoria.
Rebecca	United Kingdom	The brig was driven ashore and wrecked at Tenedos, Ottoman Empire. Her crew were rescued. She was on a voyage from Sulina, Ottoman Empire to a British port.
Rose	United Kingdom	The brig ran aground on the Whiting Sand, in the North Sea off the coast of Suffolk. She was on a voyage from Hartlepool, County Durham to Shoreham-by-Sea, Sussex. She was later refloated and resumed her voyage, arriving on 27 October.

== 25 October ==
List of shipwrecks: 25 October 1861
Ship	State	Description
E. Z.	United States	The ship ran aground on the Blackwater Bank, in Liverpool Bay. She was on a voyage from Liverpool, Lancashire, United Kingdom to New York. She was later refloated and resumed her voyage, but consequently put in to Queenstown, County Cork, United Kingdom in a leaky condition.

== 26 October ==
List of shipwrecks: 26 October 1861
Ship	State	Description
Amulet	(United Kingdom of Great Britain and Ireland) Guernsey	The ship was driven ashore and wrecked at Patras, Greece.
Ernestina	United Kingdom	The ship put in to Hyères, Var, France on fire. She was on a voyage from Hull, Yorkshire to Genoa, Italy.
Guiseppina	Flag unknown	The ship was driven ashore near Lagos, Portugal. She was on a voyage from "Giogo" to the Clyde.
Nero	France	The ship was driven ashore east of the Teignmouth Lighthouse, Devon, United Kingdom. She was refloated and taken in to Teignmouth.

== 27 October ==
List of shipwrecks: 27 October 1861
Ship	State	Description
Gauntlet	United Kingdom	The brig was wrecked on the Lemon and Ore Sand, in the North Sea. Her crew go on board the Lemon Lightship ( Trinity House), from where they were rescued on 29 October by the lugger Samaritan (United Kingdom). Gauntlet was on a voyage from South Shields, County Durham to Havre de Grâce, Seine-Inférieure, France.
George and Sarah	United Kingdom	The ship was driven ashore at Whitstable, Kent. She was on a voyage from London to Boulogne, Pas-de-Calais, France. She was refloated on 30 October and taken in to The Swale.
Hillborough	United Kingdom	The ship was driven ashore at Waterford. She was on a voyage from Saint John, New Brunswick, British North America to Waterford.
Yorsh (Ёрш, 'Ruffe')	Imperial Russian Navy	The ship ran aground between Kronstadt and Oranienbaum. Her crew were rescued. She was refloated on 2 November and taken in to Kronstadt.

== 28 October ==
List of shipwrecks: 28 October 1861
Ship	State	Description
Benochie	United Kingdom	The brig was lost in the Danube at "Manda", Ottoman Empire with the loss of six of the eleven people on board. She was on a voyage from Sulina, Ottoman Empire to Faversham, Kent.
Gitana	Spain	The ship was wrecked in the Bahamas. She was on a voyage from Havana, Cuba to Havre de Grâce, Seine-Inférieure, France.
Hector	United Kingdom	The Mersey Flat ran aground off the Point of Ayr, Cheshire.
Kingfisher	United Kingdom	The ship was lost on this day. She was on a voyage from the River Tyne to Lowestoft, Suffolk.
Magdalen	United Kingdom	The ship was wrecked on the Skerweather Sands, in the Bristol Channel.
HMS Monkey	Royal Navy	The tug was run into by a brig and severely damaged at Woolwich, Kent. She was taken in to Woolwich Dockyard for repairs.
William Thompson	United Kingdom	The ship sprang a leak and was abandoned in the North Sea. 30 nautical miles (56 km) east by north half north of Flamborough Head, Yorkshire. Her crew were rescued by Wrights (United Kingdom). William Thompson was on a voyage from Sunderland, County Durham to Hamburg.
Three unidentified vessels	Confederate States of America	American Civil War, Union blockade: Personnel in boats from the armed screw steamer USS Louisiana (United States Navy) boarded and burned three Confederate vessels in Chincoteague Inlet off Virginia.
Anglo-American	United States	The schooner was wrecked on the east side of Tomales Point at Tomales Bay on the coast of California. The crew got ashore safely but the vessel was a total loss.

== 29 October ==
List of shipwrecks: 29 October 1861
Ship	State	Description
Ariel	Norway	The ship was driven ashore near Calais, France.
Carolina	United Kingdom	The barque was driven ashore at Buenos Aires, Argentina.
Carolina	Argentina	The schooner was wrecked at Buenos Aires when the steamship Mississippi (United States) ran into her.
Diana	Argentina	The schooner was damaged at Buenos Aires when the steamship Mississippi (United States) ran into her.
Dolores	Argentina	The schooner ran aground at Buenos Aires.
Dolores	Argentina	The pilot boat was driven ashore at Buenos Aires.
Foreman	(United Kingdom of Great Britain and Ireland) Jersey	The barque was driven ashore and wrecked in the Magdalen Islands, Nova Scotia, British North America. She was on a voyage from London to Montreal, Province of Canada, British North America.
George W. Coffee	Confederate States of America	American Civil War: The 177-ton sidewheel ferry sank at Mount Pleasant, South Carolina, perhaps due to sabotage by Union sympathizers. She later was refloated.
Henrich Arens	Hamburg	The brig was driven ashore at Buenos Aires.
Mariquita	Argentina	The pilot boat was driven ashore at Buenos Aires.
Mississippi	United States	The steamship was driven ashore at Buenos Aires.
Pantsyr (Панцырь, 'Armour')	Imperial Russian Navy	The ship ran aground between Kronstadt and Oranienbaum. Her crew were rescued. She was attempting to refloat Yorsh (Imperial Russian Navy, see § 27 October). Pantsyr was refloated on 12 December and taken in to Kronstadt.
Rayo	Argentina	The schooner ran aground at Buenos Aires.
Rayo	Argentina	The pilot boat was driven ashore at Buenos Aires.
Tomasito	Argentina	The pilot boat was driven ashore at Buenos Aires.

== 30 October ==
List of shipwrecks: 30 October 1861
Ship	State	Description
Cordella	United States	The ship was abandoned in the Atlantic Ocean. Her crew survived. Shew as on a voyage from Philadelphia, Pennsylvania to Queenstown, County Cork, United Kingdom.
Daniel Towbridge	United States	American Civil War: The 200-ton packet schooner was burned in the Atlantic Ocean northeast of Dominica at either 16°40′N 58°16′W or 17°54′N 56°03′W by the merchant raider CSS Sumter (Confederate States Navy). Sumter had captured Daniel Trowbridge, carrying a cargo of fresh provisions from New Haven, Connecticut, to Demerara, British Guiana, on 27 October.
General de Pimodan	France	The ship was wrecked on the Palister Reef.
Hebe	Sweden	The brig ran aground on the Lemon Sand, in the English Channel. She was on a voyage from Gävle to the Cape of Good Hope, Cape Colony. She was refloated and put in to Cowes, Isle of Wight, United Kingdom.
Jean Parmentier	France	The ship struck a reef off the coast of Brazil and was damaged. She was on a voyage from Newcastle upon Tyne, Northumberland, United Kingdom to Pernambuco, Brazil. She was refloated.
Keystone State	United States	Carrying a cargo of crockery, farm implements, glassware, and hardware and US$3,000 to US$9,000 in gold in a safe, the 1,354-ton sidewheel paddle steamer sank in Lake Huron northeast of Port Austin in the Thumb region of Michigan near Saginaw Bay at 44°04′N 83°00′W.
Lady Katherine Barham	United Kingdom	The ship was driven ashore at Margate, Kent. She was on a voyage from London to Jamaica.
Mary Ann	United Kingdom	The brig was sighted off Flamborough Head, Yorkshire whilst on a voyage from the River Wear to Littlehampton, Sussex. No further trace, presumed foundered with the loss of all hands.
Savanac	United States	The ship was damaged by fire at Philadelphia, Pennsylvania.
Unidentified barges	Confederate States of America	American Civil War: Confederate forces filled the barges with rocks and scuttled them as blockships in the Cumberland River in Tennessee near Fort Donelson.

== 31 October ==
List of shipwrecks: 31 October 1861
Ship	State	Description
El Jeide	Flag unknown	The ship was driven ashore at "Pulloheeny", County Sligo, United Kingdom.
Morning Star	(United Kingdom of Great Britain and Ireland) British North America	The schooner was destroyed by fire at Mahone Bay, Nova Scotia.
Peerless	United States	American Civil War: Carrying a cargo of stores and cattle for use by Union forces in the upcoming Battle of Port Royal, the 690-ton steam transport sank in the North Atlantic Ocean off the coast of North Carolina near Cape Hatteras. Her crew were rescued by the sloop-of-war USS Mohican (United States Navy).
Salinas	United States	The screw steamer was swamped at the mouth of the Salinas River on the coast of California and run aground. She later was refloated.
William IV	United Kingdom	The schooner collided with Jane (United Kingdom) and sank at Great Yarmouth, Norfolk. Her crew were rescued. She was on a voyage from South Shields, County Durham to Lowestoft, Suffolk.
Xanthe	(United Kingdom of Great Britain and Ireland) Jersey	The ship departed from Le Vivier-sur-Mer, Ille-et-Vilaine for Swansea, Glamorgan. Presumed foundered off Jersey with the loss of all hands, a quantity of apples which washed up were thought to be part of her cargo.

== Unknown date ==
List of shipwrecks: Unknown date in October 1861
Ship	State	Description
Agnes	United Kingdom	The ship was wrecked in a typhoon at Formosa on 14 or 18 October.
Belle	United Kingdom	The brig was wrecked at Barbados with the loss of five of her crew.
Bourdon	France	The steamship was lost on or before 22 October.
Coquette	United Kingdom	The ship was damaged by ice at Arkhangelsk, Russia.
Ellen	United Kingdom	The barque was wrecked off Struy's Point, Cape Colony. Her crew were rescued. She was on a voyage from Colombo, Ceylon to London.
Giorgio	Greece	The brig was driven ashore and wrecked at Fort Ricasoli, Malta with the loss of eight of her eleven crew. She was on a voyage from Alexandria, Egypt to Malta.
John King	United Kingdom	The ship was abandoned in the Atlantic Ocean. Her crew were rescued. She was on a voyage from Liverpool, Lancashire to Dalhousie, New Brunswick, British North America.
Kim Po Sing	(Thailand) Siam	The barque foundered.
Lady Lovat	United Kingdom	The ship was driven ashore and severely damaged at Cromarty. She was on a voyage from Inverness to Newcastle upon Tyne, Northumberland. She was refloated on 8 October and towed back to Inverness.
Lunaria	United Kingdom	The ship was wrecked at Port Elizabeth.
Marie	France	The ship ran aground on the Haisborough Sands, in the North Sea off the coast of Norfolk, United Kingdom. She was on a voyage from sunderland, County Durham to Storå, Norway. She was refloated and assisted in to Harwich, Essex, United Kingdom.
Natalie	(United Kingdom of Great Britain and Ireland) British Cape Colony	The steamship was wrecked at the mouth of the Umkomazi River.
Nightingale	United States	The clipper ran aground at the mouth of the Mississippi River. She was on a voyage from Fort Pickens, Florida to New York. She was later refloated and resumed her voyage.
Normandie	United States	The ship ran aground at Havre de Grâce, Seine-Inférieure, France and broke her back. She was refloated a few days later.
Pacific	United Kingdom	The barque sank in a typhoon at Keelung on 13, 14 or 18 October, during voyage from Swatow to Shanghai, Imperial China, with only two survivors.
Pepin I	France	The steamship was lost on or before 22 October.
Pepin IV	France	The steamship was lost on or before 22 October.
Pilot Fish	United Kingdom	The ship departed from Milford Haven, Pembrokeshire in late October. No further trace, presumed foundered with the loss of all hands.
St. Olaf	Norway	The steamship was driven ashore at Christiania. She was on a voyage from Hamburg to Christiania.
St. Petersburg	Russia	The ship was driven ashore on Farø, Denmark. She was on a voyage from Kronstadt to Hull, Yorkshire, United Kingdom. She was refloated and resumed her voyage.
Therese	(United Kingdom of Great Britain and Ireland) Cape Colony	The schooner was wrecked at Port Elizabeth.
Thomas Watson	United Kingdom	American Civil War, Union Blockade: The ship was captured by USS Flag (United States Navy) at Charleston, South Carolina, Confederate States of America before 23 October. She was on a voyage from Liverpool to Charleston. She was run ashore and burnt.
Zelie	France	The barque ran aground at North Shields, Northumberland. She was refloated but drove on to the Herd Sand. Zelie was subsequently towed in to the River Tyne in a leaky condition.
