= List of shipwrecks in November 1861 =

The list of shipwrecks in November 1861 includes ships sunk, foundered, grounded, or otherwise lost during November 1861.

== 1 November ==
List of shipwrecks: 1 November 1861
Ship	State	Description
Amelia	United Kingdom	The unballasted brig was driven out to sea from West Hartlepool, County Durham. She subsequently came ashore near Redcar, Yorkshire. The boy on board was rescued.
Argo	United Kingdom	The ship was lost at Norderney, Kingdom of Hanover.
Atlas	United Kingdom	The steamship was driven ashore at Runswick, Yorkshire. She was refloated on 24 December and taken in to Rosedale, Yorkshire in a severely leaky condition.
Brothers	United Kingdom	The ship was driven ashore at Troup Head, Aberdeenshire. Her crew were rescued. She was on a voyage from Garmouth, Moray to Sunderland, County Durham.
Cairo	United Kingdom	The barque was driven ashore at Yalta, Russia.
Clyde	United Kingdom	The ship was wrecked at Gravelines, Nord, France. Her crew survived.
Cynthia	United Kingdom	The brig collided with Christofino (Italy) and sank in the Black Sea. Her crew were rescued by Christofino. Cynthia was on a voyage from Brăila, Ottoman Empire to a British port.
Enterprise	United Kingdom	The schooner departed from Hartlepool, County Durham for Lymington, Hampshire. No further trace, presumed foundered with the loss of all hands.
Emma	United Kingdom	The collier departed from the River Tyne for London. No further trace, presumed foundered with the loss of all hands.
Friends	United Kingdom	The brig was driven ashore and wrecked 3 nautical miles (5.6 km) south of Bridlington, Yorkshire. Her four crew were rescued by the Bridlington Lifeboat. She was on a voyage from King's Lynn, Norfolk to Port Dundas, Renfrewshire.
Friend's Goodwill	United Kingdom	The collier departed from the River Tyne for London. No further trace, presumed foundered with the loss of all hands.
Harbinger	United Kingdom	The schooner foundered in the North Sea off Bridlington with the loss of all hands.
John and William	United Kingdom	The smack was "wilfully set afire" at Harwich, Essex.
Marin	United States	The schooner was lost in Tomales Bay on the coast of California. She drifted onto Smith's Point on the east side of the bay. The crew got ashore safely, but the vessel was wrecked.
Octavia	United Kingdom	The ship struck a rock in the Rance and was wrecked. Her crew were rescued.
Perseverance	United Kingdom	The collier departed from the River Tyne for London. No further trace, presumed foundered with the loss of all hands.
Produce	United Kingdom	The fishing smack foundered in the North Sea off Bridlington. Her crew were rescued by a fishing coble.
Robert Watson	United Kingdom	The barque was driven ashore at Seaton Carew. Five of her crew were rescued by the Seaton Lifeboat. She was on a voyage from Hamburg to Sunderland. She had become a wreck by 6 November.
Shincliffe	United Kingdom	The ship was wrecked at Callantsoog, North Holland, Netherlands. She was on a voyage from Sunderland to the Nieuw Diep.
Solide	United Kingdom	The ship was wrecked on the Skerweather Sands, in the Bristol Channel with the loss of all hands. She was on a voyage from Havana, Cuba to Bristol, Gloucestershire.
Stella	United Kingdom	The collier, a brig, departed from the River Tyne for London. No further trace, presumed foundered with the loss of all hands.
Venus	United Kingdom	The ship struck the Angus Rock and sank. She was on a voyage from Portaferry, County Down to Maryport, Cumberland.
William	United Kingdom	The ship was driven ashore and wrecked at Lossiemouth, Moray. Her crew survived.
William and Thomas	United Kingdom	The collier departed from the River Tyne for London. No further trace, presumed foundered with the loss of all hands.
Yarborough	United Kingdom	The steamship was wrecked on the Sandhale, off the coast of Lincolnshire with the loss of three of her crew. Survivors took to boats and landed at Ingoldmells. She was on a voyage from Grimsby, Lincolnshire to Kronstadt, Russia.
Unnamed	Flag unknown	The schooner was wrecked on the Skerweather Sands with the loss of all hands.
Unnamed	Flag unknown	The schooner was driven ashore at Breaksea Point, Glamorgan.

== 2 November ==
List of shipwrecks: 2 November 1861
Ship	State	Description
Albion	United Kingdom	The barque was abandoned off Walton-on-the-Naze, Essex. She was on a voyage from Faversham, Kent to Ipswich, Suffolk. She was subsequently towed in to Harwich, Essex.
Amelia	United Kingdom	The RNLI Scarborough lifeboat was wrecked, attempting to rescue the crew of the schooner Coupland, resulting in the loss of two lifeboat men, and three members of the public, who waded into the water to assist the stricken lifeboat crew.
Auchencruive	United Kingdom	The schooner was driven ashore and wrecked near Banff, Aberdeenshire. Her six crew were rescued by the RNLI Banff lifeboat. She was on a voyage from the River Spey to Grangemouth, Stirlingshire.
Britannia	United Kingdom	The Mersey Flat sank in the River Dee. Her crew were rescued. She was on a voyage from St Helens, Lancashire to Bangor, Caernarfonshire. She was later refloated and taken in to Mostyn, Flintshire.
Buxton	United Kingdom	The lugger foundered in the North Sea with the loss of all hands.
Chance	United Kingdom	The ship was wrecked on the Dutch coast with the loss of her captain.
Concordia	Norway	The schooner was wrecked on the Black Skare Rocks, in the Farne Islands, Northumberland, United Kingdom. Her crew were rescued. She was on a voyage from Drammen to Leith, Lothian, United Kingdom.
Countess Canning, or Viscountess Canning	(United Kingdom of Great Britain and Ireland) Guernsey	The ship was wrecked at Blakeney, Norfolk with the loss of one of her eight crew. She was on a voyage from Dunkerque, Nord, France to Berwick upon Tweed, Northumberland.
Coupland	United Kingdom	The schooner was driven ashore at Scarborough, Yorkshire. Her crew were rescued by Dennett's rocket apparatus.
Darius	United Kingdom	The brig was wrecked on the Longsand, in the North Sea off the coast of Essex with the loss of five of her eleven crew. Survivors were rescued by the smack Volunteer (United Kingdom). Darius was on her maiden voyage, from South Shields, County Durham to Constantinople, Ottoman Empire.
Emilie	Denmark	The schooner was driven ashore at Grimsby, Lincolnshire, United Kingdom. She was on a voyage Hull, Yorkshire to Nakskov. She was refloated with assistance from the tug Wilberforce (United Kingdom) and towed in to Grimsby.
Emma	United Kingdom	The brig was driven ashore at Huttoft, Lincolnshire. She was on a voyage from London to South Shields. She was refloated on 1 December and taken in to Whitby, Yorkshire.
Essa	United Kingdom	The ship foundered off Ostend, West Flanders, Belgium. She was on a voyage from London to Amsterdam, North Holland, Netherlands.
Galatea	United Kingdom	The ship foundered off Runton, Norfolk.
Gipsey Queen	United Kingdom	The ship was wrecked at Withernsea, Yorkshire with the loss of all hands.
Gainsborough Packet	United Kingdom	The schooner sank off Filey, Yorkshire. Her crew were rescued by Josephine (United Kingdom).
Hannah	United Kingdom	The ship ran aground at Whitby. She was refloated and taken in to Whitby, where she sank.
Harbinger	United Kingdom	The coaster, a schooner, foundered in the North Sea off Flamborough Head, East Riding of Yorkshire with the loss of all hands.
Harmony	United Kingdom	The ran aground and sank in the Swin. Her seven crew were rescued the next day by the smack Joseph (United Kingdom). Harmony was on a voyage from Sunderland, County Durham to London.
Herring	United Kingdom	The ship struck the pier at Whitby and sank.
Isabella	United Kingdom	The ship was wrecked at Ostend, West Flanders, Belgium with the loss of all hands, at least four lives.
Jabondle	United Kingdom	The ship ran aground on the East Knock Sand, off the coast of Kent. She was on a voyage from Hemlock, Province of Canada, British North America to London. She was refloated and assisted in to Whitstable, Kent in a leaky condition.
Jane	United Kingdom	The ship was driven ashore at Cleethorpes, Lincolnshire. Her crw were rescued. She was on a voyage from Hull, Yorkshire to Whitby.
John Brown	Hamburg	The ship was driven ashore and wrecked at Mablethorpe, Lincolnshire.
Lady Douglas	United Kingdom	The brig was abandoned in the North Sea off Southwold, Suffolk. Her crew were rescued. Lady Douglas was on a voyage from Hartlepool to London. She was taken in to Ramsgate, Kent in a derelict condition on 4 November.
Mary	United Kingdom	The sloop was wrecked at Macduff, Aberdeenshire. Her crew were rescued. She was on a voyage from Macduff to Leith.
North Eastern	United Kingdom	The steamship was driven ashore on Saaremaa, Russia. She was on her maiden voyage, from Havre de Grâce, Seine-Inférieure, France to Kronstadt, Russia
Ocean	United Kingdom	The Yorkshire Billyboy was wrecked at Withernsea with the loss of all hands.
Osceola	United States	Carrying a cargo of potatoes, vegetables, horses, and cattle to Port Royal, South Carolina, the 177-ton screw steamer was stranded in a gale off the coast of South Carolina at Day Breaker off North Island near Georgetown.
Prince Albert	United Kingdom	The ship was reported to be in a sinking condition at Dunkerque, Nord, France.
Rimouski	Russia	The barque was driven ashore north of Seaton Carew. Her crew were rescued by the Seaton Lifeboat. She was on a voyage from Riga to West Hartlepool or from Hartlepool, County Durham to a Baltic port. She had become a wreck by 8 November.
Robert and Jane	United Kingdom	The ship was driven ashore and wrecked at Lindisfarne, Northumberland.
Sarah Huntley	United Kingdom	The ship was wrecked on the Goodwin Sands, Kent with the loss of nine of her eleven crew. She was on a voyage from Sunderland to Odesa.
Sarah Williams	United Kingdom	The schooner was run into by Cornelius Grinnell (United States) off the North Foreland, Kent and was abandoned. She was on a voyage from South Shields to Porto, Portugal. She was subsequently towed in to Ramsgate, Kent.
Sarepta	United Kingdom	The ship was driven ashore and wrecked at Heacham, Norfolk.
Terra Nova	United Kingdom	The ship sank at Dungeness, Kent. Her crew were rescued. She was on a voyage from Dartmouth, Devon to Middlesbrough, Yorkshire.
Thrifty	United Kingdom	The schooner was wrecked in the River Mersey.
Triumph	United Kingdom	The lugger foundered in the North Sea with the loss of all hands.
Tryall	United Kingdom	The ship departed from North Shields, Northumberland for Hastings, Sussex. No further trace, presumed foundered with the loss of all hands.
Undaunted	United Kingdom	The ship capsized at King's Lynn, Norfolk with the loss of two of her crew.
Undine	United Kingdom	The yacht foundered in the North Sea. Her crew were rescued.
Union	United States	Carrying a cargo of rifle muskets, horses, gun carriages, and musket powder intended for use in the upcoming Battle of Port Royal, the 149-ton sidewheel transport was driven onto a beach on the coast of North Carolina 8 miles (13 km) east of Bogue Inlet during a storm on the night of 1–2 November and was wrecked.
Unity	United Kingdom	The brig was driven ashore and wrecked at Mablethorpe. Her crew were rescued. She was on a voyage from Whitby to London.
Wilhelm Precht	Bremen	The ship was driven ashore and wrecked at Mablethorpe.
William	United Kingdom	The schooner ran aground on the Nore. She was on a voyage from Hartlepool to London. She was refloated on 4 November with assistance from a brig and resumed her voyage.
Zealous	United Kingdom	The ship foundered in the North Sea off the mouth of the Humber. Her crew were rescued by Aerial (United Kingdom). She was on a voyage from Amble, Northumberland to Boulogne, Pas-de-Calais, France.
Scarborough Lifeboat	United Kingdom	The lifeboat was wrecked whilst going to the rescue of Coupland (United Kingdom) with the loss of two of her eight crew. Two people drowned whilst attempting to rescue the lifeboatmen.
Unnamed	United Kingdom	The ship was driven ashore and wrecked 3 nautical miles (5.6 km) south of Scarborough with the loss of all hands.
Unnamed	United Kingdom	The brig was driven ashore and wrecked at Withernsea. Her crew were rescued.
Unnamed	Netherlands	The schooner was driven ashore near Leith, Lothian, United Kingdom.
Unnamed	United Kingdom	The ship sank off "La Sanne", France with the loss of all hands.

== 3 November ==
List of shipwrecks: 3 November 1861
Ship	State	Description
Adventure	United Kingdom	The fishing smack was driven ashore at Great Yarmouth, Norfolk. Her ten crew were rescued by the Great Yarmouth Lifeboat.
Amulet	United Kingdom	The ship was driven ashore at Cape Papas, Greece. She was on a voyage from Patras, Greece to London.
Billow	United Kingdom	The Yorkshire Billyboy was driven ashore and wrecked 5 nautical miles (9.3 km) south of Bridlington, Yorkshire. Her crew were rescued. She was on a voyage from Wisbech, Cambridgeshire to Newcastle upon Tyne, Northumberland. Billow was refloated on 29 December and taken in to Bridlington.
Dunrobin	United Kingdom	The schooner was driven ashore and wrecked at Sunderland, County Durham, Her crew survived. She was refloated on 7 November.
Fame	United Kingdom	The brig was driven ashore and wrecked 4 nautical miles (7.4 km) south of Bridlington. Her crew were rescued. She was on a voyage from King's Lynn, Norfolk to Seaham, County Durham.
Frolic	United Kingdom	The barque ran aground and capsized at Cardiff, Glamorgan. She was on a voyage from Queenstown, County Cork to Cardiff.
Gainsborough Packet	United Kingdom	The brig foundered in the North Sea off Scarborough, Yorkshire. Her crew were rescued by the brig Josephine (United Kingdom). Gainsborough Packet was on a voyage from Montrose, Forfarshire to Sunderland, County Durham.
Governor	United States	American Civil War: The 644-ton sidewheel paddle steamer, bound for Port Royal, South Carolina, carrying 650 passengers – including a battalion of 385 United States Marines – and a cargo of 19,000 rounds of ammunition, was damaged by a storm and sank in the North Atlantic Ocean off Georgetown, South Carolina, while under tow by the armed screw steamer USS Isaac Smith (United States Navy). With the barque Young Rover (flag unknown) standing by to assist, the frigate USS Sabine (United States Navy) rescued everyone on board except for six people who died when they fell into the sea while trying to jump between the ships.
Horatio	United Kingdom	The brig foundered off the Goodwin Sands, Kent. Her crew were rescued. She was on a voyage from Blyth, Northumberland to Dieppe, Seine-Inférieure, France.
Katherine	United Kingdom	The ship collided with the smack Speedwell (United Kingdom) and was beached. She was on a voyage from King's Lynn to Hartlepool, County Durham. She was later refloated and put back to King's Lynn.
Margaret Ann	United Kingdom	The collier, a brig, ran aground and broke her back at Hamburg. She was on a voyage from South Shields, County Durham to Hamburg. She was declared at total loss. The wreck was dispersed by explosives.
Maritana	United States	The 991-ton full-rigged ship — a square-rigger — was lost on the Shag Rocks in Broad Sound in Outer Boston Harbor off the coast of Massachusetts at 42°19′47″N 70°52′54″W with the loss of 24 to 27 lives (according to different sources) among the 39 people on board. She was on a voyage from Liverpool, Lancashire, United Kingdom to Boston, Massachusetts.
Mary	United Kingdom	The ship sank in the Sound of Kilblanen, off the Argyllshire coast.
Mary Ann	United Kingdom	The schooner was driven ashore and wrecked at Sunderland. Her crew survived. She was on a voyage from Sunderland to Dundee, Forfarshire.
Nathaniel Cogswell	flag unknown	The barque was lost off Scituate, Massachusetts. She was on a voyage from Málaga, Spain to Boston, Massachusetts.
Orb	(United Kingdom of Great Britain and Ireland) Guernsey	The brigantine was run down and sunk in the English Channel 3 nautical miles (5.6 km) off Dover, Kent by the steamship Becha (Russia). Her crew survived. She was on a voyage from Newcastle upon Tyne to Dartmouth, Devon.
Udny	United Kingdom	The schooner was driven ashore and wrecked at Sunderland. Her crew survived. She was on a voyage from Peterhead, Aberdeenshire to Sunderland.
Valiant	United Kingdom	The ship sprang a leak and foundered off the Galloper Sand, in the North Sea. Her crew were rescued. She was on a voyage from Sunderland, County Durham to London.

== 4 November ==
List of shipwrecks: 4 November 1861
Ship	State	Description
Clyde	United Kingdom	The ship was driven ashore at Gravelines, Pas-de-Calais, France.
Colonist	Norway	The ship was driven ashore and wrecked near Brielle, South Holland, Netherlands. Her crew were rescued. She was on a voyage from Portsmouth, Hampshire, United Kingdom to Skien.
Ethel	United Kingdom	The ship was driven ashore on the coast of Norfolk.
Guiding Star	United States	The brig was driven ashore at Odesa. She was on a voyage from Odesa to a British port. She was refloated and resumed her voyage.
Jenny	United Kingdom	The ship departed from Aalborg, Denmark for La Rochelle, Charente-Inférieure, France. No further trace, presumed foundered with the loss of all hands.
Lapwing	United Kingdom	The schooner was driven ashore at King's Lynn, Norfolk. Her crew were rescued. She was on a voyage from Hunstanton, Norfolk to Sunderland, County Durham.
Rokeby	United Kingdom	The brig was driven ashore at Westkapelle, Zeeland, Netherlands . She was on a voyage from Antwerp, Belgium to Sunderland. She subsequently became a wreck.
Thomas Edward	United Kingdom	The schooner was driven ashore west of Brancaster, Norfolk. Her crew were rescued by the Coastguard. She was on a voyage from London to South Shields, County Durham.
Wellington	United Kingdom	The schooner ran aground on Taylor's Bank, in Liverpool Bay. Her crew were rescued. She was on a voyage from Whitehaven, Cumberland to Liverpool, Lancashire.
Widnes, or Witness	United Kingdom	The schooner sank off Formby, Lancashire. Her crew were rescued by the tug Dreadnought (United Kingdom).

== 5 November ==
List of shipwrecks: 5 November 1861
Ship	State	Description
Archer	United Kingdom	The brig was wrecked near Rønne, Denmark with the loss of all hands.
Commodore	United Kingdom	The ship foundered in the English Channel off Fairlight, Sussex. She was on a voyage from Guernsey, Channel Islands to London.
Cynthia	United Kingdom	The ship was run down by a barque and sank in the Black Sea. Her crew were rescued. She was on a voyage from Brăila, Ottoman Empire to a British port.
Garland	United Kingdom	The ship was abandoned in the Atlantic Ocean. Her crew were rescued by William Chamberlain (United Kingdom). Garland was on a voyage from New York, United States to Queenstown, County Cork.
John	United Kingdom	The brig was driven ashore at Shoreham-by-Sea, Sussex. Her crew were rescued. She was on a voyage from Newcastle upon Tyne, Northumberland to Havre de Grâce, Seine-Inférieure, France.
London	(United Kingdom of Great Britain and Ireland) Jersey	The ship struck rocks off Gorey, Jersey and was beached in Achirondel Bay. She was on a voyage from Newcastle upon Tyne to Le Vivier-sur-Mer, Ille-et-Vilaine, France. She was refloated and taken in to Gorey.
RMS North Briton	United Kingdom	The steamship was wrecked on Paraquet Island, Province of Canada, British North America. All on board were rescued. She was on a voyage from Quebec City, Province of Canada to Liverpool, Lancashire.
Pearl	United Kingdom	The brig ran aground at Le Conquet, Finistère, France.
Plantagenet	United Kingdom	The ship departed from London for Gävle, Sweden. No further trace, presumed foundered with the loss of all hands.
Prony	French Navy	American Civil War: The corvette, observing naval activities during the American Civil War on behalf of the French Navy, was wrecked without loss of life in the Atlantic Ocean off Ocracoke Inlet, North Carolina, during a storm.
Reaper	United Kingdom	The brig was wrecked 2 nautical miles (3.7 km) south of Rønne, Denmark with the loss of all hands. She was on a voyage from Grangemouth, Stirlingshire to Riga, Russia.
Sinus	Stralsund	The ship was driven ashore and sank at Rügen, Prussia. Her crew were rescued. She was on a voyage from the Weser to Stralsund.
Sunbeam	United Kingdom	The ship was run into by the full-rigged ship Borodino (United States) and sank off Flamborough Head, Yorkshire with the loss of five of her crew.

== 6 November ==
List of shipwrecks: 6 November 1861
Ship	State	Description
Ada	Confederate States of America	American Civil War: Carrying a cargo of wood, the 120-ton schooner ran aground in Virginia, either 5 to 6 miles (8 to 10 km) from the mouth of the Curatona Branch of the Rappahannock River or on Corrotoman Creek, 26 miles (42 km) from the mouth of the Rappahannock River. She then was burned by a small-boat expedition from the armed screw steamer USS Rescue (United States Navy).
Huntress	Confederate States of America	American Civil War: The full-rigged ship was scuttled by Confederate forces as a blockship to obstruct Skull Creek in South Carolina.
John Alexander	United Kingdom	The ship was wrecked on the Mull of Kintyre, Argyllshire. Her crew survived. She was on a voyage from Greenock, Renfrewshire to the Cape of Good Hope, Cape Colony.
CSS Lady Davis	Confederate States Navy	American Civil War: The screw steamer was scuttled by Confederate forces as a blockship to obstruct Skull Creek in South Carolina.
Rosalia	Italy	The brig ran aground and was severely damaged at Ramsgate, Kent, United Kingdom. She was on a voyage from Newcastle upon Tyne, Northumberland, United Kingdom to Naples.
Rowan Tree	United States	The ship ran aground on Sandy Key. She was on a voyage from Havana, Cuba to New York. She was refloated and taken in to Nassau, Bahamas.
Saxon	United Kingdom	The ship was sighted off Cape St. Vincent, Portugal whilst on a voyage from Odesa to Havre de Grâce, Seine-Inférieure, France. No further trace, presumed foundered with the loss of all hands.
Sydney	United Kingdom	The ship put in to Ramsgate in a sinking condition. She was on a voyage from South Shields, County Durham to Briton Ferry, Glamorgan.
Vrye Hemdel	Netherlands	The ship was wrecked in the Glénan Islands, Finistère, France. Her crew were rescued. She was on a voyage from Galaţi, Ottoman Empire to Amsterdam, North Holland.
Waterwitch	United Kingdom	The steamship foundered in the Bristol Channel. Her crew were rescued. She was on a voyage from the Clyde to Porto, Portugal.
Unidentified light boats	Confederate States of America	American Civil War: The light boats were scuttled by Confederate forces as blockships to obstruct Skull Creek in South Carolina.

== 7 November ==
List of shipwrecks: 7 November 1861
Ship	State	Description
Anne	Norway	The schooner struck a rock and sank off "Karingo". She was on a voyage from Newcastle upon Tyne, Northumberland, United Kingdom to Christiania.
Ark	United Kingdom	The brig ran aground on the Shipwash Sand, in the North Sea off the coast of Suffolk. She was on a voyage from Sunderland, County Durham to London. She was refloated and resumed her voyage.
Eliza Hanson	United Kingdom	The schooner was driven ashore at Blakeney, Norfolk. She was on a voyage from Newcastle upon Tyne to Plymouth, Devon. She was refloated and taken in to Blakeney.
Ernst and Julie	Rostock	The ship was driven ashore in the Kattegat. She was on a voyage from Newcastle upon Tyne to Rostock. She was refloated and put in to Helsingør, Denmark in a leaky condition.
Romantree	United Kingdom	The full-rigged ship ran aground on the Bahama Banks. She was on a voyage from Havana, Cuba to New York City, United States. She was refloated and taken in to Nassau, Bahamas.
Shorncliffe	United Kingdom	The ship was driven ashore and wrecked on the Dutch coast. Her crew were rescued. She was on a voyage from Sunderland, County Durham to the Nieuw Diep.
CSS Winslow	Confederate States Navy	The 207-ton armed sidewheel paddle steamer struck a submerged hulk on the coast of North Carolina at the entrance to Ocracoke Inlet while attempting to come to the aid of the wrecked corvette Prony (French Navy) and was burned by her crew to prevent her capture by Union forces.
Two unidentified light ships	Confederate States of America	The two light ships were burned by Confederate forces 3 miles (5 km) below Beaufort, South Carolina.

== 8 November ==
List of shipwrecks: 8 November 1861
Ship	State	Description
Ann and Mary	United Kingdom	The ship departed from Skinningrove, Yorkshire for Newcastle upon Tyne, Northumberland. No further trace, presumed foundered with the loss of all hands.
Ardgowan	United Kingdom	The schooner departed from Helsingør, Denmark for London. No further trace, presumed foundered with the loss of all seven people on board, possibly on 14 November.
Cantilabria	French Navy	The 2,500-ton frigate ran aground on a shoal off Cape Hatteras, North Carolina, during a gale. Her crew abandoned ship, and she caught fire and blew up.
Dom Pedro II	Imperial Brazilian Navy	The steamship was wrecked at Montevideo, Uruguay.
Fairy	United Kingdom	The brig struck rocks at Cabaret, Haiti ad was abandoned. She subsequently drove out to sea and collided with the brig Buen Consejo (Spain). She was later taken in to Puerto Plata, Dominican Republic, where she was condemned.
Imperator Nikolai I	Russian Empire	The paddle steamer struck a rock during a snowstorm and was lost near Kake in Russian America. Alaska Natives rescued her crew.
Josephine	Norway	The ship was driven ashore and wrecked at Gothenburg, Sweden. Her crew were rescued.
Londesborough	United Kingdom	The brig sprang a leak and was beached at Grimsby Lincolnshire. She was on a voyage from South Shields, County Durham to Dunkerque, Nord, France.
Lovely Jenny	United Kingdom	The sloop foundered off Rhyl, Denbighshire. She was on a voyage from Mostyn, Flintshire to Bangor, Caernarfonshire.
Royal Yacht	Confederate States of America	American Civil War, Union blockade: The schooner was captured and burned at Galveston, Texas, by boat crews from the frigate USS Santee (United States Navy).
Suez	Norway	The ship was lost off "Helgeran" with the loss of a crew member. She was on a voyage from London, United Kingdom to Christiania.

== 9 November ==
List of shipwrecks: 9 November 1861
Ship	State	Description
Agnes	United Kingdom	The Colchester-registered ship was severely damaged at Bridlington.
Agnes	United Kingdom	The Great Yarmouth-registered ship was damaged at Bridlington, Yorkshire. She was on a voyage from Caen, Calvados, France to Newcastle upon Tyne, Northumberland.
Albion	United Kingdom	The King's Lynn-registered ship was severely damaged at Bridlington. She was on a voyage from King's Lynn to Sunderland, County Durham.
Albion	United Kingdom	The Wisbech-registered schooner was severely damaged at Bridlington. She was on a voyage from Dunkerque, Nord, France to Berwick upon Tweed, Northumberland.
Albion	United Kingdom	The Great Yarmouth-registered ship was damaged at Bridlington. She was on a voyage from Mistley, Essex to Hartlepool, County Durham.
Anna	United Kingdom	The ship was damaged at Bridlington.
B. H. Bayfield	United Kingdom	The ship was damaged at Bridlington.
Cæsar	United Kingdom	The ship was damaged at Bridlington.
Catherine	United Kingdom	The ship was driven ashore at Bridlington. She was on a voyage from King's Lynn to Seaham, County Durham.
Circe	United Kingdom	The ship was severely damaged at Bridlington. She was on a voyage from King's Lynn to Sunderland.
City of Agra	United Kingdom	The ship caught fire at Liverpool, Lancashire with the loss of a crew member. She was on a voyage from Bombay, India to Liverpool.
Courtenay	United Kingdom	The ship was driven ashore on Anticosti Island, Nova Scotia, British North America.
Dove	United Kingdom	The ship was driven ashore at Bridlington. She was on a voyage from King's Lynn to Hartlepool. Dove was refloated on 1 December and taken in to Bridlington.
Earl Gray	United Kingdom	The ship was damaged at Bridlington. She was on a voyage from London to Hartlepool.
Ellen Muray	(United Kingdom of Great Britain and Ireland) Jersey	The ship was struck the pier and was damaged at Bridlington. She was on a voyage from Jersey to Seaham.
Euphemia	United Kingdom	The ship was driven ashore at Bridlington. She was on a voyage from Ipswich, Suffolk to Seaham. She was later refloated and taken in to Bridlington.
Favourite	United Kingdom	The brig was driven ashore at Bridlington. She was on a voyage from London to Sunderland. She was consequently condemned, but was sold. Favourite was refloated on 2 December and taken in to Bridlington.
Goodwill	United Kingdom	The ship was driven ashore at Bridlington.
Hoop	Netherlands	The ship was driven ashore at Bridlington. She was on a voyage from Antwerp, Belgium to Newcastle upon Tyne.
Hope	United Kingdom	The ship sank at Bridlington.
Isis	United Kingdom	The ship was damaged at Bridlington. She was on a voyage from Great Yarmouth, Norfolk to Sunderland.
James	United Kingdom	The ship was damaged at Bridlington. She was on a voyage from London to Sunderland.
John and Jane	United Kingdom	The ship was driven ashore at Bridlington. She was on a voyage from Great Yarmouth to Blyth, Northumberland. She had broken up by 14 November.
Laura, and Yar	United Kingdom	Laura was damaged at Bridlington when Yar was driven into her. She was on a voyage from Grimsby, Lincolnshire to Sunderland. Yar was severely damaged. She was on a voyage from King's Lynn to Seaham.
Maconochie	(United Kingdom of Great Britain and Ireland) British North America	The ship was driven ashore on Anticosti Island.
New Isabella	United Kingdom	The ship was damaged at Bridlington. She was on a voyage from Great Yarmouth to South Shields.
Naomi	United Kingdom	The barque caught fire at Liverpool and was damaged.
Ocean Bride	United Kingdom	The ship put in to Falmouth, Cornwall in a waterlogged condition. She was on a voyage from Quebec City, Province of Canada, British North America to Sunderland.
Pandora	United Kingdom	The ship was damaged at Bridlington. She was on a voyage from King's Lynn to Hartlepool.
Petrel	United Kingdom	The ship was driven ashore at Bridlington. She was on a voyage from Exmouth, Devon to Seaham. She had broken up by 14 November.
Sarah Ann	United Kingdom	The ship was damaged at Bridlington. She was on a voyage from King's Lynn to Sunderland.
Sophia	United Kingdom	The ship sank at Bridlington. She was on a voyage from Birkenhead, Cheshire to Sunderland.
Spring	United Kingdom	The ship was damaged at Bridlington.
Squirrel	United Kingdom	The ship was damaged at Bridlington.
Stockton	United Kingdom	The ship was damaged at Bridlington. She was on a voyage from Faversham, Kent to Seaham.
Sylph	United Kingdom	The ship was driven ashore at Bridlington.
Undine	United Kingdom	The ship was driven ashore and severely damaged at Bridlington. She was subsequently repaired and returned to service.
Union	United Kingdom	The ship was in collision with the schooner Elizabeth (Denmark) and foundered in the English Channel off Folkestone, Kent. Her crew were rescued by Elizabeth.
Venus	United Kingdom	The ship was driven ashore at Bridlington. She was on a voyage from Caen to Seaham. Venus was refloated on 1 December and taken in to Bridlington.
Vinko	Kingdom of Lombardy–Venetia	The ship ran aground on Scroby Sands, Norfolk. She was on a voyage from Middlesbrough, Yorkshire to Venice. She was refloated and assisted in to Great Yarmouth.
Violet	United Kingdom	The brig put in to Bridlington in a severely damaged condition and sank there. She was on a voyage from Dieppe, Seine-Inférieure, France to Hartlepool. Sold as a wreck, she was repaired and returned to service.
Waterwitch	United Kingdom	The ship was driven ashore at Bridlington. She was on a voyage from London to Middlesbrough. Waterwitch was refloated on 1 December and taken in to Bridlington.
William and Jane	United Kingdom	The ship was driven ashore and wrecked at Bridlington. She was on a voyage from "Belleport" to Sunderland. William and Jane was refloated on 1 December and taken in to Bridlington.
Unnamed	United Kingdom	The brig was driven ashore north of Bridlington. Her crew were rescued by the Coastguard using rocket apparatus.
Unnamed	United Kingdom	The schooner was driven ashore north of Bridlington. Her crew were rescued by the Coastguard using rocket apparatus.
Unnamed	United Kingdom	The ship was driven ashore south of Bridlington. Her crew were rescued by the Coastguard using rocket apparatus.
Unnamed	France	The ship was driven ashore at Bridlington.
Six vessels	United Kingdom	The ships were driven ashore at Wilsthorpe, Yorkshire. Their crews were rescued by the Coastguard using rocket apparatus.
Three vessels	United Kingdom	The ships foundered off Flamborough Head, Yorkshire with the loss of all hands.

== 10 November ==
List of shipwrecks: 10 November 1861
Ship	State	Description
Bata	Norway	The brig ran aground on the Gunfleet Sand, in the North Sea off the coast of Essex, United Kingdom. She was on a voyage from Christiania to London, United Kingdom.
Caledonia	United Kingdom	The schooner foundered 6 nautical miles (11 km) south west of the Hulvoquets. Her crew survived. She was on a voyage from Tralee, County Kerry to Cork.
Confidence	United Kingdom	The brig was driven ashore and wrecked north of Lowestoft, Suffolk. Her crew were rescued by Blessing (United Kingdom).
Delta	United Kingdom	The brig was run down and sunk in the Thames Estuary 6 nautical miles (11 km) off the Nore by the steamship Resolute (United Kingdom). Her crew were rescued. She was on a voyage from Newcastle upon Tyne, Northumberland to London.
Edse, and Windward	Hamburg; United States	The barque Edse collided with the full-rigged ship Windward in the Bristol Channel west of Lundy Island, Devon, United Kingdom. Both vessels were severely damaged. Edse was on a voyage from Newport, Monmouthshire, United Kingdom to Saint Thomas, Virgin Islands. She put in to Bristol, Gloucestershire, United Kingdom for repairs. Windward was on a voyage from Newport to Alicante, Spain. She put in to Bristol for repairs.
George and Mary	United Kingdom	The ship was driven ashore at Wells-next-the-Sea, Norfolk. She was on a voyage from Sunderland, County Durham to Wells-next-the-Sea.
Good Intent	United Kingdom	The ship was driven ashore at Bridlington, Yorkshire. She was on a voyage from Hull, Yorkshire to South Shields, County Durham. Good Intent was refloated on 1 December and taken in to Bridlington.
Hildegaard	Stettin	The schooner was driven ashore and wrecked at Pakefield, Suffolk. She was on a voyage from Havre de Grâce, Seine-Inférieure, France to Sunderland.
Joseph and Elizabeth	United Kingdom	The ship was driven ashore at Horsey, Norfolk. She was refloated in December and towed to Whitby, Yorkshire, arriving on 24 December.
Keystone State	United States	The paddle steamer foundered in Lake Huron north west of Harrisville, Michigan with the loss of all 33 people on board.
Mary Ann	United Kingdom	The sloop was driven ashore and wrecked at Rottingdean, Sussex. Her crew were rescued. She was on a voyage from Goole, Yorkshire to Gosport, Hampshire.
Ondine	United Kingdom	The ship was driven ashore at Bridlington. She was on a voyage from Great Yarmouth, Norfolk to Sunderland. Ondine was refloated on 1 December and taken in to Bridlington.
Pet	United Kingdom	The ship was driven ashore between Brighton and Shoreham-by-Sea, Sussex.
Petrel	United Kingdom	The ship was driven ashore at Bridlington. She had broken up by 14 November.
Raven	United Kingdom	The ship was driven ashore and sank at Haslar, Hampshire. Her four crew rescued. She was on a voyage from the Isle of Wight to Portsmouth, Hampshire.
Samoda	United Kingdom	The ship departed from New York, United States for Liverpool, Lancashire. No further trace, presumed foundered with the loss of all hands.
Swan	United Kingdom	The barque was driven ashore at Bamburgh Castle, Northumberland. She was consequently condemned.
Thomas and Elizabeth	United Kingdom	The brig was wrecked on the Gunfleet Sand, in the North Sea off the coast of Essex. Her crew were rescued by the schooner Alert (United Kingdom). Thomas and Elizabeth was refloated and taken in to Harwich, Essex in a leaky condition the next day.
William Maitland	United Kingdom	The ship ran aground at Whitby, Yorkshire. She was refloated the next day and taken in to Whitby.
Undaunted	United Kingdom	The barque was abandoned off Lowestoft with the loss of three of her fourteen crew. Survivors were rescued by the Lowestoft Lifeboat. She subsequently came ashore at Lowestoft. She was on a voyage from Arkhangelsk, Russia to London. Undaunted had become a wreck by 15 November.
Unnamed	Bremen	The schooner was driven ashore near Pakefield.

== 11 November ==
List of shipwrecks: 11 November 1861
Ship	State	Description
Blanchard	United Kingdom	The ship was driven ashore near Berwick upon Tweed, Northumberland. Her crew were rescued. She was on a voyage from Struer, Denmark to Aberdeen.
Confidence	United Kingdom	The brig was driven ashore at Lowestoft, Suffolk. Her crew were rescued.
Euxine	United Kingdom	The brig foundered off Lytham St. Annes, Lancashire. She was on a voyage from Alexandria, Egypt to Liverpool, Lancashire.
Fly	United Kingdom	The schooner sank at Liverpool. Her four crew were rescued by a lifeboat. She was on a voyage from Padstow, Cornwall to Liverpool.
Frances Griffiths	United Kingdom	The schooner was driven ashore and wrecked at Penrhyn Bay, Caernarfonshire. Her crew were rescued. She was on a voyage from Llanelly, Glamorgan to Dublin.
Gem	United Kingdom	The ship struck both piers at Bridport, Dorset and was damaged. She was on a voyage from South Shields to Bridport.
General Admiral	Russia	The steamship ran aground at Kronstadt. She was refloated and resumed her voyage, but was driven ashore between Kronstadt and Oranienbaum. Her passengers were taken off by the steamship Zara (Russia). General Admiral was refloated on 13 November and taken in to Kronstadt.
Good Intent	United Kingdom	The schooner was driven ashore at Crosby, Lancashire.
Hendrika Hellechina	Netherlands	The schooner sank off Bornholm, Denmark.
Hillebrandt	France	The ship was driven ashore at Pakefield, Suffolk. She was on a voyage from Havre de Grâce, Seine-Inférieure to Sunderland, County Durham, United Kingdom.
Joseph Healy	United Kingdom	The ship was driven ashore at Youghal, County Cork. She was on a voyage from Troon, Ayrshire to Galway.
Marion	Norway	The brigantine was wrecked on the Abertay Sand, in the North Sea. Her crew were rescued. She was on a voyage from Fredrikstad, Norway to Dundee, Forfarshire, United Kingdom.
Nettle	United Kingdom	The cutter sank in Havelet Bay, Guernsey, Channel Islands. Her four crew survived. She was on a voyage from Málaga, Spain to Guernsey. She was refloated on 13 November but was consequently condemned.
Pfeil	Rostock	The ship was wrecked near Gothenburg, Sweden. Her crew were rescued. She was on a voyage from Charleston, South Carolina, Confederate States of America to Rostock.
Prompt	United Kingdom	The East Indiaman, a barque, sank in Liverpool Bay with the loss of fifteen of the twenty people on board. Survivors were rescued by the tug Brother Jonathan (United Kingdom). Prompt was on a voyage from Rangoon, Burma to Liverpool.
Ranger	United Kingdom	The ship collided with Eclair (United Kingdom) and sank off Lundy Island, Devon. Her crew were rescued. She was on a voyage from Neath, Glamorgan to Teignmouth, Devon.
Raven	United Kingdom	The ship sank in the Solent off the Haslar Hospital, Gosport, Hampshire. She was refloated and taken in to Portsmouth, Hampshire for repairs.
Sister Ann	United Kingdom	The brig was wrecked at Liverpool. She was on a voyage from Whitehaven, Cumberland to Cardiff, Glamorgan.
Solon	Denmark	The ship was wrecked on Morup's Reef, near Gotheburg. Her crew were rescued. She was on a voyage from Newcastle upon Tyne, Northumberland to Copenhagen.
Union	United Kingdom	The ship collided with Commerce (United Kingdom) off Whitby, Yorkshire and was severely damaged. She was on a voyage from Portsmouth, Hampshire to Sunderland, County Durham. She continued her voyage but ran aground at Sunderland. She was refloated and taken in to port in a severely leaky condition.
Venilia	United Kingdom	The ship foundered. She was on a voyage from Cardiff, Glamorgan to Trieste.
Young Gipsey	United Kingdom	The schooner sank off Rhyl, Denbighshire. Her crew were rescued. She was on a voyage from Newport, Monmouthshire to Liverpool.

== 12 November ==
List of shipwrecks: 12 November 1861
Ship	State	Description
G. G.	United Kingdom	The Yorkshire Billyboy ran aground on the Shipwash Sand, in the North Sea off the coast of Suffolk. She was on a voyage from London to Norwich, Norfolk. She was refloated and taken in to Woodbridge, Suffolk in a derelict condition.
Hampton	United Kingdom	The ship was driven ashore near Belfast, County Antrim. She was on a voyage from Troon, Ayrshire to Cork.
Harmony	United Kingdom	The ship was wrecked on the Barrow Sand, in the North Sea off the coast of Essex. Her crew were rescued.
Malacca	United Kingdom	The steamship ran aground in the Bosphorus. She was refloated the next day and resumed her voyage to Odesa.
Sunbeam	United Kingdom	The brig was run into by an American barque and foundered in the North Sea off Flamborough Head, Yorkshire with the loss of five of her crew.
Thomas Elizabeth	United Kingdom	The ship was abandoned in the North Sea. She was on a voyage from Sunderland, County Durham to London. She was subsequently taken in to Harwich, Essex in a derelict condition.

== 13 November ==
List of shipwrecks: 13 November 1861
Ship	State	Description
Anne Pitcairn	United Kingdom	The barque was wrecked near Cobija, Chile. She was on a voyage from Cobija to Galico, Chile.
British Flag	United Kingdom	The full-rigged ship was abandoned in the Atlantic Ocean. Her crew were rescued by Ernest (United Kingdom). British Flag was on a voyage from Liverpool, Lancashire to Bombay, India.
Concord	United Kingdom	The brig was driven ashore and wrecked at Seaton Carew, County Durham.
Dublin	United Kingdom	The steamship ran aground on the Margate Sand. She was on a voyage from London to Bordeaux, Gironde, France. She was refloated and taken in to Ramsgate, Kent in a leaky condition.
Elsenia	Netherlands	The koff was driven ashore near Zoutkamp, Groningen. She was on a voyage from Zoutkamp to Zwolle, South Holland. She was refloated on 29 November.
Enchantress	United Kingdom	The steamship departed from Hull for Rotterdam, South Holland, Netherlands. No further trace, presumed foundered with the loss of all sixteen crew.
Era	United Kingdom	The steamship was driven ashore on Fårö, Sweden. She was on a voyage from Kronstadt, Russia to London. She was refloated and resumed her voyage.
Euxine	United Kingdom	The brig was wrecked on the Blackwater Bank, in the Irish Sea off the coast of Lancashire with the loss of all hands. She was on a voyage from Alexandria, Egypt to Liverpool.
Forsyth	United Kingdom	The brig was driven ashore and wrecked at Seaton Carew. She was refloated on 23 November and towed in to North Shields.
Maria Pauline	(flag) France	The ship was driven ashore at Boulogne, Pas-de-Calais. Her crew were rescued. She was on a voyage from Boulogne to Shoreham-by-Sea, Sussex, United Kingdom.
Oberon	United Kingdom	The schooner was wrecked on the Junder, off the Norwegian coast. Her crew were rescued. She was on a voyage from Newcastle upon Tyne, Northumberland to Ystad, Sweden.
Regina	United Kingdom	The brig ran aground on the Middle Sand, in the North Sea off the coast of Essex. All eleven people on board were rescued. She was on a voyage from Kronstadt to London.
Swanen	Norway	The brig was driven ashore and wrecked at Dunstanburgh Castle, Northumberland. Her crew were rescued. She was on a voyage from Sunderland, County Durham, United Kingdom to Porsgrund.
Uranus	Bremen	The ship was driven ashore in the Weser. She was on a voyage from Bremen to London. She was refloated in mid-December and towed back to Bremen.
William	United Kingdom	The brig was driven ashore and wrecked at Seaton Carew. Her crew were rescued.
Unidentified schooner	Confederate States of America	American Civil War, Union blockade: The 60-to-70-ton schooner was chased ashore on the coast of Texas at San Luis Bar by the armed schooner USS Sam Houston (United States Navy) and was wrecked.
Unnamed	United Kingdom	The coaster foundered in the North Sea off the coast of County Durham with the loss of all hands.
four unnamed vessels	Flag unknown	The ships were driven ashore at Brielle, South Holland, Netherlands.

== 14 November ==
List of shipwrecks: 14 November 1861
Ship	State	Description
Albion	United Kingdom	The brig ran aground on the Herd Sand, in the North Sea off the coast of County Durham and was damaged with the loss of a crew member. Survivors were rescued by the lifeboat Providence (United Kingdom). Albion was on a voyage from Stettin to South Shields, County Durham. She was refloated on 17 November with the assistance of four tugs and taken in to South Shields.
SMS Amazone	Prussian Navy	The corvette collided with an East Indiaman and sank in a storm in the North Sea off the coast of the Netherlands with the loss of 107 lives. Survivors were rescued by the East Indiaman.
Anna Catharina	Netherlands	The galiot was driven ashore and wrecked near South Shields with the loss of a crew member. Survivors were rescued by the Coast Guard using rocket apparatus.
Barbara	United Kingdom	The ship was driven ashore and damaged at Grimsby, Lincolnshire. She was refloated and taken in to Grimsby.
Calumet	Hamburg	The schooner was wrecked on the Gillsand, in the North Sea. She was on a voyage from Cuxhaven to an English port.
Cecile	Sweden	The ship was driven ashore at Seaton Carew, County Durham. She was refloated on 22 November and towed in to North Shields, Northumberland.
Concord	United Kingdom	The brig was driven ashore on Stranton Sands, on the coast of County Durham. Her crew were rescued.
Coward	United Kingdom	The ship was driven ashore at Seaton Carew.
Diadem	United Kingdom	The sloop was driven ashore at Tetney, Lincolnshire with the loss of a crew member.
East London	United Kingdom	The barque was driven ashore in Branabine Bay. She was on a voyage from Saint John's, Newfoundland, British North America to Berwick upon Tweed, Northumberland. She was refloated the next da and taken in to Stornoway, Isle of Lewis, Outer Hebrides.
Emma Elisa	Prussia	The schooner was driven ashore on Texel, North Holland, Netherlands. Her crew were rescued. She was on a voyage from Dublin, United Kingdom to Pillau.
Faust	Hamburg	The schooner was wrecked at Hong Kong with the loss of all but one of her crew.
Forsyth	United Kingdom	The brig was driven ashore at Seaton Carew. Her crew were rescued.
Hanging Rock	Confederate States of America	The 96-ton sternwheel paddle steamer was stranded at Cannelton, Kentucky.
Hull	Netherlands	The galiot was abandoned in the North Sea. Her crew were rescued by Ward Jackson (United Kingdom). Hull was on a voyage from Fredrikstad, Norway to Harlingen, Friesland.
Jason	United Kingdom	The ship ran aground on the Columbine Sand, off the north Kent coast. She was refloated and taken in to Whitstable, Kent in a leaky condition. She was on a voyage from Whitby to Faversham, Kent.
Jason	Russia	The barque was wrecked on Texel with the loss of all hands. A pilot was rescued. She was on a voyage from Alexandria, Egypt to Antwerp, Belgium.
Johanna Cornelius	Netherlands	The ship ran aground off Texel and was damaged. She was on a voyage from Amsterdam, North Holland to Newcastle upon Tyne, Northumberland, United Kingdom. She was refloated.
Johanna	Prussia	The ship ran aground off Rügenwalde.
Liverpool	United Kingdom	The schooner was driven ashore and wrecked at Cockburnspath, Berwickshire. Her crew were rescued. She was on a voyage from Sunderland, County Durham to Dundee, Forfarshire.
Mellano	United Kingdom	The ship was driven ashore at Seaton Carew.
Messenger	United Kingdom	The brig was driven ashore at Sunderland, County Durham. Her crew were rescued. She was on a voyage from Hamburg to Sunderland. She was refloated on 2 December.
Myrtle	United Kingdom	The schooner was driven ashore at Seaton Carew. She was refloated on 22 November and towed in to North Shields.
Pax	Denmark	The schooner was driven ashore on Texel, North Holland, Netherlands. Her crew were rescued. She was on a voyage from Dieppe, Seine-Inférieure, France to Newcastle upon Tyne, Northumberland, United Kingdom. She was refloated on 8 December.
Phoenix	United Kingdom	The brig was wrecked on the Herd Sand with the loss of one of her seven crew. Survivors were rescued by the lifeboat Northumberland (United Kingdom).
Rata	Norway	The brig ran aground on the Gunfleet Sand, in the North Sea off the coast of Essex, United Kingdom. Her crew were rescued. She was on a voyage from Christiania to London, United Kingdom. Rata was refloated on 17 November and taken in to Harwich, Essex in a wrecked condition.
Saucy Lass	United Kingdom	The fishing lugger was abandoned on the Holm Sand, in the North Sea off the coast of Suffolk. Her eleven crew were rescued by the Lowestoft Lifeboat. She was subsequently towed in to Lowestoft.
Speedwell	United Kingdom	The schooner foundered off the coast of County Durham with the loss of all hands.
Sprite	United Kingdom	The schooner foundered off Hartlepool with the loss of all hands.
Staatsrad	Denmark	The schooner was driven ashore on Texel. She was on a voyage from Horsens to Gibraltar.
Swan	United Kingdom	The brig was wrecked at "Jongsang", China.
Thill	Netherlands	The schooner was abandoned in the North Sea. Her crew were rescued by the steamship Ward Jackson (United Kingdom). Thill was on a voyage from Frederikstad, Denmark to Harlingen, Friesland.
Uranus	Grand Duchy of Oldenburg	The ship ran aground on Meyer's Ledge, in the North Sea. She was on a voyage from Bremen to Newcastle upon Tyne. She was refloated on 3 December and towed back to Bremen.
Veeche	France	The ship was driven ashore on the Stranton Sands.
Venus	Netherlands	The schooner ran aground on the Middelgrunden, in Danish waters. She was on a voyage from Riga, Russia to an English port. She was refloated.
Vesta	Norway	The ship was abandoned in the North Sea. Her crew were rescued by the steamship Ward Jackson (United Kingdom). Vesta was on a voyage from Härnösand, Sweden to Honfleur, Manche, France.
Vorwarts	Prussia	The schooner was wrecked on Texel with the loss of two of her six crew. She was on a voyage from Brăila, Ottoman Empire to Wisbech, Cambridgeshire, United Kingdom.
Welland	United Kingdom	The sloop was driven ashore at Seaton Carew, County Durham. Her crew were rescued by the Seaton Lifeboat. She was on a voyage from Barnsley, Yorkshire to Newcastle upon Tyne. She was refloated on 29 November and towed in to Hartlepool.
Whim	United Kingdom	The pilot cutter was abandoned on the Holm Sand. Her seven crew were rescued by the Lowestoft Lifeboat. She was subsequently towed in to Lowestoft.
Unidentified schooners	United States	Filled with stone, the schooners were scuttled as blockships in Ocracoke Inlet on the coast of North Carolina.

== 15 November ==
List of shipwrecks: 15 November 1861
Ship	State	Description
Agnese Luders	Denmark	The schooner was driven ashore north of the Mareogenfjord. Her crew were rescued. She was on a voyage from Odense to an English port.
Albatross	United Kingdom	The steamship ran aground at South Shields, County Durham. She was refloated on a voyage from South Shields to Hull, Yorkshire. She was refloated and put back to South Shields.
Alcyon	Russia	The ship was wrecked off the Dutch coast. Her sixteen crew were rescued. She was on a voyage from Jakobstad, Grand Duchy of Finland to London, United Kingdom.
Augusta	Flag unknown	The ship was driven ashore and wrecked on Texel, North Holland Netherlands. Her crew were rescued.
Bella	United Kingdom	The ship was driven ashore on the south coast of Texel. She was on a voyage from Lowestoft, Suffolk to Hamburg.
Blue Jacket	United Kingdom	The ship was driven ashore at Loosduinen, South Holland, Netherlands with the loss of two or three of her crew. She was on a voyage from Antwerp, Belgium to Ipswich, Suffolk. She was refloated on 8 December.
Burira	United Kingdom	The ship was sighted off Bic, Province of Canada, British North America whilst on a voyage from Montreal, Province of Canada to Liverpool, Lancashire. No further trace, presumed foundered with the loss of all hands.
Carl von Rebbeck	Belgium	The ship was abandoned off the Galloper Sand, in the North Sea. Her crew were rescued by a British fishing vessel. She was on a voyage from London to Odesa.
Cito	Prussia	The schooner ran aground in the Vlie. Her crew were rescued. She was on a voyage from Limerick, United Kingdom to Memel.
Confidence	United Kingdom	The brig ran aground on the Shipwash Sand, in the North Sea off the coast of Suffolk and sank. Her crew were rescued by Beeswing (United Kingdom). Confidence was on a voyage from Great Yarmouth, Norfolk to Antwerp. She was refloated around 12 August 1862 and taken in to Harwich, Essex.
Emigrant	Flag unknown	The ship was wrecked off "Zanteland".
Fife Maid	United Kingdom	The schooner was wrecked on the Blackwater Bank, in the Irish Sea. Her crew were rescued. She was on a voyage from Wick, Caithness to Waterford.
Fisher	United Kingdom	The smack ran aground in the Nieuw Diep and was damaged.
John	United Kingdom	The brig foundered in the North Sea. Her crew were rescued by the barque Pearl (United Kingdom). John was on a voyage from Hartlepool, County Durham to London.
Lively	United Kingdom	The brig ran aground on Scroby Sands, Norfolk. Her five crew survived. She was refloated with assistance from the Caistor Lifeboat.
Mary Kerr	United Kingdom	The ship was driven ashore at the Landguard Fort, Felixtowe, Suffolk. She was on a voyage from Alloa, Clackmannanshire to Havre de Grâce, Seine-Inférieure, France. She was refloated and taken in to Harwich.
Mary R. Barney	United States	The full-rigged ship was driven ashore at "Gammekens".
Paddy	United Kingdom	The yawl foundered in the Belfast Lough with the loss of all five crew.
South Esk	United Kingdom	The barque was driven ashore and wrecked between Aldbrough and Withernsea, Yorkshire with the loss of a crew member. She was on a voyage from Hartlepool to Hamburg.
Wilhelmme	Sweden	The ship ran aground on the Kloot Bank, off the Belgian coast.

== 16 November ==
List of shipwrecks: 16 November 1861
Ship	State	Description
Agnethe	Kingdom of Hanover	The ship was driven ashore and wrecked at Norden. Her crew were rescued. She was on a voyage from Grangemouth, Stirlingshire, United Kingdom to Leer.
Anna Boone, or Anna Perrine	France	The ship ran aground on the Braak Bank, in the North Sea off the coast of Nord, France and sank. Her crew were rescued. She was on a voyage from Sunderland, County Durham, United Kingdom to Nantes, Loire-Inférieure.
Fife Maid	United Kingdom	The ship was wrecked on the Blackwater Bank, in the Irish Sea off the coast of County Wexford, United Kingdom. Her crew were rescued. She was on a voyage from Wick, Caithness to Waterford, United Kingdom.
Frederike	Hamburg	The schooner was abandoned in the North Sea. Her crew were rescued by Hazard (Norway). Frederike was on a voyage from Rostock to Leith, Lothian, United Kingdom.
Friedrich Wilhelm	Stettin	The ship was driven ashore in the Sound of Saarbek. She was on a voyage from Hartlepool, County Durham to Stettin. She had been refloated by 20 November and taken in to Copenhagen, Denmark for repairs.
Giuseppina	Italy	The ship was wrecked near Lagos, Portugal. She was on a voyage from "Gioja" to the Clyde.
Ivan	Russia	The schooner was driven ashore at Fredrikshavn, Denmark. She was on a voyage from Liepāja to a French port.
John	United Kingdom	The ship was driven ashore and wrecked on Hartzholmen, Denmark. She was on a voyage from Kronstadt, Russia to London.
Lucy	France	The brig was abandoned in the Atlantic Ocean. Her crew were rescued by Roger A. Hiern (United States). Lucy was on a voyage from Sierra Leone to Marseille, Bouches-du-Rhône.
Ninus	Flag unknown	The barque sank in the Sacramento River below R Street in Sacramento, California.
Regina	United Kingdom	The ship was wrecked on the Kentish Knock.
Rhodes	United Kingdom	The schooner was wrecked on the Herd Sand, in the North Sea off the coast of County Durham. Her crew were rescued by the lifeboat Northumberland (United Kingdom). Rhodes was on a voyage from Bo'ness, Lothian to the River Tyne. Rhodes was refloated with assistance from the tugs Brothers, Robert Ingham and Vanguard (all United Kingdom) and beached at South Shields, County Durham.
Unnamed	Flag unknown	The ship was driven ashore at Fredrikshavn.

== 17 November ==
List of shipwrecks: 17 November 1861
Ship	State	Description
Apolline	Sweden	The ship was driven ashore at Kalmar. She was on a voyage from the River Tyne to Stockholm.
Egbert	United Kingdom	The ship was driven ashore on the coast of Suffolk. Five people were rescued by Spider (United Kingdom).
Eleanor	United Kingdom	The barque was destroyed by fire in the Atlantic Ocean (6°30′N 23°43′W). All on board were rescued by J. G. Richardson (United States). Eleanor was on a voyage from London to New Zealand.
Emma	United Kingdom	The brig was driven ashore at "Walde", Pas-de-Calais, France. Her crew were rescued. She was on a voyage from Fécamp, Seine-Inférieure, France to Hartlepool, County Durham.
Gladiator	United Kingdom	The ship driven ashore at Copenhagen, Denmark.
Larne	United Kingdom	The schooner was damaged by fire in Lough Swilly. She was on a voyage from Liverpool, Lancashire to Tralee, County Kerry.
Margarete	Denmark	The schooner was driven ashore and wrecked at Flamborough Head, Yorkshire, United Kingdom.
Maria Theresa	Danzig	The ship was driven ashore at Copenhagen.
Nordstern	Rostock	The brigantine was abandoned in the Dogger Bank. Her crew were rescued by the steamship Ward Jackson (United Kingdom). Nordstern was on a voyage from Memel, Prussia to Newcastle upon Tyne, Northumberland, United Kingdom.
Perseverance	United Kingdom	The ship was driven ashore on the Kent coast. She was on a voyage from London to Cardiff, Glamorgan. She was refloated and taken in to Ramsgate, Kent.
Shrimp	(United Kingdom of Great Britain and Ireland) Cape Colony	The schooner sank at East London with the loss of all hands.
Susan	United Kingdom	The schooner ran into the full-rigged ship Duke of Roxburgh (United Kingdom) and sank in the Kingroad, off the coast of Somerset.

== 18 November ==
List of shipwrecks: 18 November 1861
Ship	State	Description
Elizabeth Mary	(United Kingdom of Great Britain and Ireland) Cape Colony	The ship capsized and sank at East London with the loss of all but her captain.
Fortuna Sonne	Flag unknown	The derelict ship was taken in to Tønsberg, Norway.
Helena	Kingdom of Hanover	The derelict galiot was towed in to Grimsby, Lincolnshire, United Kingdom by the smack Celerity (United Kingdom).
Lion	United Kingdom	The steamship was wrecked on Gotland, Sweden. Her crew were rescued. She was on a voyage from Kronstadt, Russia to Hull, Yorkshire.
Margarette	United Kingdom	The abandoned ship was driven ashore and wrecked at Flamborough Head, Yorkshire.
Mary	(United Kingdom of Great Britain and Ireland) Jersey	The ship was driven ashore at Saint-Malo, Ille-et-Vilaine, France. She was refloated and taken in to Saint-Malo.
Mary	United Kingdom	The ship ran aground on the Pampus Bank in the North Sea off the coast of Zeeland, Netherlands. She was refloated and taken in to Hellevoetsluis in a leaky condition.
Union	Norway	The brig was abandoned in the North Sea. Her crew were rescued by Meanee (United Kingdom). Union was on a voyage from Fredrikstad to Dover, Kent, United Kingdom.
Wester Schouwen	Netherlands	The galiot was abandoned off the Dutch coast. Her crew were rescued by the smacks Dum Spiro Spero (Flag unknown) and Royal Stamp (United Kingdom). Wester Schouwen was on a voyage from Newcastle upon Tyne, Northumberland, United Kingdom to Rotterdam, South Holland.

== 19 November ==
List of shipwrecks: 19 November 1861
Ship	State	Description
Atlas	United Kingdom	The schooner ran aground in Wexford Bay. She was on a voyage from Ayr to Wexford. She was refloated and taken in to Wexford.
Beatrice	United Kingdom	The ship was driven ashore on "Sesseleie", Denmark. She was on a voyage from Kronstadt, Russia to London She subsequently became a wreck.
Beta	United Kingdom	The schooner ran aground on the Holm Sand, in the North Sea off the coast of Suffolk. She was on a voyage from London to Whitby, Yorkshire.
Colonist	United Kingdom	The ship was driven ashore on "Lysegund", Denmark before 18 November. She was on a voyage from Kronstadt to London. She was refloated and taken in to Anholt in a waterlogged condition.
Harvey Birch	United States	American Civil War: The 1,482-ton clipper, bound from Havre de Grâce, Seine-Inférieure, France to New York in ballast, was captured and burned in the North Atlantic Ocean off Cape Clear Island, County Cork, United Kingdom (49°06′N 09°52′W) by the merchant raider CSS Nashville (Confederate States Navy).
Johanna Emilie	France	The ship sank in the Gulf of Riga with the loss of all but two of her crew. She was on a voyage from Riga, Russia to Havre de Grâce, Seine-Inférieure.
HMS Lucifer	Royal Navy	The gunvessel ran aground. Subsequently refloated, repaired and returned to service.
Nora	United Kingdom	The ship was driven ashore and wrecked at Thisted, Denmark. Her crew were rescued.
Odin	Sweden	The barque was driven ashore south of "Amask", Denmark. She was on a voyage from Gävle to London. She was refloated on 22 November and taken in to Copenhagen, Denmark for repairs.
Quebec	United Kingdom	The ship departed from Quebec City, Province of Canada, British North America for Liverpool, Lancashire. No further trace, presumed foundered with the loss of all hands.
Selene	(Russian Empire) Grand Duchy of Finland	The schooner was driven ashore and wrecked on "Wulff's Island", Russia with the loss of all hands.

== 20 November ==
List of shipwrecks: 20 November 1861
Ship	State	Description
Hebe	United Kingdom	The steamship was driven ashore and wrecked near "Fahrsund", on the coast of Jutland. She was on a voyage from London to Grimstad, Norway.
Norma	Duchy of Holstein	The ship was abandoned in the Dogger Bank. Her crew were rescued by Algir (Flag unknown). Norma was on a voyage from Oulu, Grand Duchy of Finland to London.
Rebecca	Norway	The schooner foundered in the Dogger Bank. Her crew were rescued by Regina (United Kingdom).
Sarah Kay	United Kingdom	The ship departed from New York, United States for Queenstown, County Cork. No further trace, presumed foundered with the loss of all hands.
Senior	Bremen	The brigantine was wrecked on Sylt, Duchy of Holstein. Her crew were rescued. She was on a voyage from South Shields, County Durham, United Kingdom to Geestemünde.
Unnamed	Norway	The derelict barque was driven ashore at Harwich, Essex, United Kingdom.

== 21 November ==
List of shipwrecks: 21 November 1861
Ship	State	Description
Adelaide	United Kingdom	The ship was wrecked at Douglas, Isle of Man. Her crew were rescued. She was on a voyage from Dumfries to Portmarnock, County Dublin.
Diadem	United Kingdom	The brig ran aground off Kristiansand, Denmark. She was on a voyage from Kronstadt, Russia to London. She was refloated and found to be leaky.
Deptford	United Kingdom	The steamship ran aground 18 nautical miles (33 km) east of Falsterbo, Sweden. She was on a voyage from Havre de Grâce, Seine-Inférieure, France to Königsberg, Prussia. She was refloated and put in to Pillau, Prussia, where she sank.
Durus	United Kingdom	The ship was driven ashore and wrecked at Aberfraw Point, in Carnarvon Bay with the loss of her captain. She was on a voyage from Alexandria, Egypt to Liverpool, Lancashire.
Erno	United Kingdom	The brig was driven ashore and severely damaged at Troon, Ayrshire. Her crew were rescued.
Fortuna	Prussia	The ship was abandoned in the North Sea. Her crew were rescued. She was on a voyage from Belfast, County Antrim, United Kingdom to Ventava, Courland Governorate. Fortuna had been taken in to Tønsberg, Norway by 25 November.
George	United Kingdom	The barque ran aground off Læsø, Denmark. She was on a voyage from London to Danzig. She was refloated but her crew refused to proceed, the ship being leaky.
Hebe	United Kingdom	The ship was driven ashore and wrecked on Gotland, Sweden. She was on a voyage from Kronstadt, Russia to Hull, Yorkshire.
Ocean	United Kingdom	The ship was abandoned in the Atlantic Ocean. Her crew were rescued by Charlotte Hayes (United Kingdom). Ocean was on a voyage from Sulina, Ottoman Empire to Queenstown, County Cork.
Onward	United Kingdom	The ship was driven ashore and wrecked between Port Gordon and Banff, Aberdeenshire. Her crew were rescued. She was on a voyage from Sunderland, County Durham to Banff.
Prins van Oranje	Netherlands	The steamship was driven ashore at Brielle, South Holland.
Sarah Kay	United Kingdom	The ship departed from New York for Queenstown. No further trace, presumed foundered with the loss of all hands.
Staghound	(United Kingdom of Great Britain and Ireland) New South Wales	The 112-ton schooner, bound from Sydney to the South Sea Islands, drove ashore in a gale.

== 22 November ==
List of shipwrecks: 22 November 1861
Ship	State	Description
Diana, and Willem II	United Kingdom; Netherlands	The steamships collided off the Dutch coast. Diana was on a voyage from London to Amsterdam, North Holland. She completed her voyage with her bows stove in. Willem II was on a voyage from Amsterdam to Hamburg. She was beached on the Pampus sinking at the bow.
Hulda	Denmark	The ship collided with Else Johanne (Denmark) and was abandoned off Fredrikshavn. Her crew were rescued by Else Johanne.
Lisette	Stettin	The ship was driven ashore on Læsø, Denmark. She was on a voyage from Stettin to Belfast, County Antrim, United Kingdom.
Perlan	Denmark	The galeas was driven ashore at Lysekil, Sweden. She was on a voyage from Leith, Lothian, United Kingdom to Nakskov.

== 23 November ==
List of shipwrecks: 23 November 1861
Ship	State	Description
Beccles	United Kingdom	The ship ran aground on the Herd Sand, in the North Sea off the coast of County Durham. She was refloated.
Duff	United Kingdom	The brig ran aground on the Cross Sand, in the North Sea off the coast of Suffolk. She was on a voyage from Sunderland, County Durham to Portsmouth, Hampshire. She was refloated and assisted in to Harwich, Essex in a leaky condition.
Gladiator	Danzig	The ship was wrecked on the Videvorde Reef, off the coast of Denmark. Her crew were rescued. She was on a voyage from Danzig to London, United Kingdom.
Killarney	United Kingdom	The steamship ran aground on the North Bank, in the North Sea off the coast of South Holland, Netherlands.
Maria	United Kingdom	The brig was driven ashore and wrecked near "Hallo" with the loss of four of her crew. She was on a voyage from Riga, Russia to London.
Ocean Child	United Kingdom	The ship was wrecked on Blysmsholmen, Sweden. Her crew were rescued. She was on a voyage from London to Lysekil, Sweden.
Rebecca	United Kingdom	The abandoned brigantine came ashore at Callantsoog, North Holland, Netherlands.
Strathbogie	United Kingdom	The ship was reported to have been abandoned in the English Channel off St. Alban's Head, Dorset with the loss of a crew member. Also reported as having been abandoned in the North Sea off Coquet Island, Northumberland whilst on a voyage from Sunderland, County Durham to Banff, Aberdeenshire. Her crew were rescued.
CSS Tuscarora	Confederate States Navy	American Civil War: The gunboat was destroyed by an accidental fire on the Mississippi River at Helena, Arkansas.

== 24 November ==
List of shipwrecks: 24 November 1861
Ship	State	Description
Corinthian	United States	The full-rigged ship was destroyed by fire at Lisbon, Portugal. She was on a voyage from Cardiff, Glamorgan, United Kingdom to Alicante, Spain.
Derby	United Kingdom	The derelict schooner was discovered off Whitby, Yorkshire. She was towed in to Grimsby, Lincolnshire by the steamship Hamburg (United Kingdom).
Ebenezer	United Kingdom	The ship was driven ashore on Læsø, Denmark. She was on a voyage from Hull, Yorkshire to Flensburg, Duchy of Holstein. She was refloated and taken in to Fredrikshavn, Denmark for repairs.
Noraa	Russia	The barque was driven ashore and wrecked near Strömstad, Sweden. Her crew were rescued. She was on a voyage from Leith, Lothian, United Kingdom to Liepāja.
Vanquisher	United Kingdom	The ship ran aground off Læsø. She was on a voyage from Kronstadt, Russia to London. She was refloated and put in to Gothenburg, Sweden in a leaky condition.
Wolbertas	Sweden	The ship was driven ashore on Læsø. She was on a voyage from Hull to Landskrona.

== 25 November ==
List of shipwrecks: 25 November 1861
Ship	State	Description
A. F. Moore	United Kingdom	The brig was abandoned off the mouth of the River Plate in a waterlogged condition. Her crew were rescued by Ismay (United Kingdom). A. F. Moore was on a voyage from Caldera, Chile to Swansea Glamorgan.
Alexander	United Kingdom	The steamship ran aground on the Stubben, off Copenhagen, Denmark. She was on a voyage from Stettin to Hull, Yorkshire. She was refloated the next day and taken in to Copenhagen.
Alfredo	Uruguay	The ship was wrecked south of Pernambuco, Brazil. She was on a voyage from Montevideo to London, United Kingdom.
Ann Dorothea	Denmark	The sloop ran aground and sank at Bjørn, Norway. Her crew were rescued. She was on a voyage from Newcastle upon Tyne, Northumberland, United Kingdom to Svendborg.
Carl and Emma	Rostock	The ship was wrecked at Hartlepool, County Durham, United Kingdom. Her crew were rescued. She was on a voyage for Newcastle upon Tyne, Northumberland, United Kingdom to Rostock. Also reported as being wrecked in the Hamlefjord, near Gothenburg, Sweden.
Castle Lachlan	United Kingdom	The ship ran aground at South Shields, County Durham. She was on a voyage from South Shields to Cartagena, Spain. She was refloated and resumed her voyage, but consequently put in to Grimsby, Lincolnshire in a leaky condition.
Earl of Clancarty	United Kingdom	The schooner ran aground on the Corton Sand, in the North Sea off the coast of Suffolk and was wrecked. Her crew were rescued. She was on a voyage from South Shields, County Durham to London.
Eliza	Denmark	The ship was sunk by ice in the Daugava.
Eliza Ann	United Kingdom	The schooner was abandoned off Castletown, Isle of Man. Her crew were rescued by the Castletown Lifeboat.
Famous	United Kingdom	The schooner was abandoned in the North Sea 16 nautical miles (30 km) off the Dudgeon Lightship ( Trinity House). She was on a voyage from Hartlepool to London.
Fettererso Castle	United Kingdom	The sloop ran aground on the Annat Bank, in the North Sea off the coast of Forfarshire. Her crew were rescued by the Montrose Lifeboat. She was on a voyage from Peterhead, Aberdeenshire to Sunderland, County Durham.
Gem	United Kingdom	The schooner was abandoned in the North Sea. Her crew were rescued by Peter and Wilhelm (Odessa). Gem was on a voyage from King's Lynn, Norfolk to Leith, Lothian.
Hand of Providence	United Kingdom	The ship ran aground on the Kettlebottom Sand. She was on a voyage from South Shields to London. She was refloated and taken in to Harwich, Essex in a leaky condition.
Ida	United Kingdom	The ship was driven ashore in Luce Bay. Her crew were rescued. She was on a voyage from Newry, County Antrim to Belfast and Whitehaven, Cumberland.
Joseph Weir	United Kingdom	The barque was driven ashore and wrecked on Jura. She was on a voyage from Miramichi, New Brunswick, British North America to Londonderry.
L'Anseleppo	Flag unknown	The ship was driven ashore north of Ramsey, Isle of Man. She was on a voyage from Londonderry to Amlwch, Anglesey. She was refloated and taken in to Ramsy.
Nancy	United Kingdom	The sloop was driven ashore at Castledykes, Forfarshire.
Nimrod	(United Kingdom of Great Britain and Ireland) Isle of Man	The ship was driven ashore north of Ramsey.
Pansboro	United Kingdom	The ship ran aground in Manxmans Lake, Kirkcudbrightshire. She was on a voyage from Marport, Cumberland to Belfast, County Antrim. She was refloated on 12 December but again ran aground and became waterlogged.
Providentia	Stralsund	The ship was wrecked off Alstenskar, Norway. She was on a voyage from Sunderland to Stettin.
Ringdove	United Kingdom	The schooner was driven ashore 4 nautical miles (7.4 km) north of Ramsey. She was on a voyage from Whitehaven, Cumberland to Dundalk, County Louth.
Vivid	United Kingdom	The ship ran aground on the Kentish Knock and sank. She was on a voyage from Hartlepool to Poole, Dorset.
William Pitt	United Kingdom	The ship foundered in the English Channel off Bognor, Sussex.

== 26 November ==
List of shipwrecks: 26 November 1861
Ship	State	Description
Arcade	United States	American Civil War: The 121-ton schooner, carrying a cargo of barrel staves, was captured and burned in the North Atlantic Ocean north of the Leeward Islands at 20°27′N 57°15′W by the merchant raider CSS Sumter (Confederate States Navy).
Beatrice	United Kingdom	The steamship struck the pier at the entrance to the Hellevoet Canal, Zeeland, Netherlands and sank.
Charlotte H. Lund	United Kingdom	The ship ran aground on the Ridge Sand and was damaged. She was on a voyage from Calcutta, India to London. She was refloated with the assistance of a French lugger and found to be severely leaky. Twenty extra hands were taken on and she resumed her voyage.
Eclipse	United Kingdom	The schooner sank at Chichester, Sussex with the loss of all hands. She was on a voyage from London to Portsmouth Dockyard, Hampshire.
Empress	United Kingdom	The ship was driven ashore at Kilmuckridge, County Wexford. Her crew were rescued.
Express	United Kingdom	The brig was abandoned 10 nautical miles (19 km) off Skagen, Denmark. Her ten crew were rescued by the yacht Anne Colone (Norway). Express was on a voyage from Kronstadt, Russia to South Shields, County Durham.
Fanny	Prussia	The brig was driven ashore at Domsten, Sweden. She was on a voyage from Sunderland, County Durham, United Kingdom to Memel.
Ida	United Kingdom	The schooner was driven ashore in Luce Bay. Her crew were rescued. She was on a voyage from Newry, County Antrim to Whitehaven, Cumberland.
Lydia	United Kingdom	The ship was driven ashore at Kilmuckridge.
Major Wulff	Duchy of Holstein	The brig was driven ashore near Uddevalla Sweden. She was onh a voyage from Newcastle upon Tyne, Northumberland, United Kingdom to Flensburg.
Martha	Duchy of Holstein	The ship was driven ashore near "Gronhow". Her crew were rescued. She was on a voyage from Newcastle upon Tyne to Flensburg.
Pealen	Norway	The ship was driven ashore near Lysekil with the loss of a crew member.
Rose	United Kingdom	The steamship foundered with the loss of all hands. She was on a voyage from Londonderry to Glasgow, Renfrewshire.
Sea Bird	United Kingdom	The barque was abandoned in the Irish Sea off Whitehaven, Cumberland and subsequently sank. Her crew were rescued. She was on a voyage from Cardiff, Glamorgan to Liverpool, Lancashire.
Sea Horse	United Kingdom	The ship ran aground at Hellevoetsluis, Zeeland.
Triton	United Kingdom	The ship was driven ashore and wrecked at Lowestoft, Suffolk. Her crew were rescued by rocket apparatus. She was on a voyage from South Shields, County Durham to London.
Triton	United Kingdom	The ship ran agroundd on the Gunfleet Sand, in the North Sea off the coast of Suffolk and was abandoned by her crew. She was on a voyage from Ventava, Courland Governorate to London. She was refloated on 28 November and taken in to the River Colne.

== 27 November ==
List of shipwrecks: 27 November 1861
Ship	State	Description
Aquarius	United Kingdom	The ship ran aground on the Varne Bank, in the English Channel. She was on a voyage from London to Glückstadt, Duchy of Schleswig.
Camillus	United Kingdom	The barque was driven ashore near "Haske", Sweden. She was on a voyage from Danzig to London. She was refloated and taken in to Fjällbacka, Sweden, where she was beached.
Carlo XV	Norway	The ship was wrecked at Thisted, Denmark with the loss of six of the seventeen people on board. She was on a voyage from Bombay, India to Christiania.
Darley	United Kingdom	The schooner was discovered derelict in the North Sea. She was towed in to Grimsby, Lincolnshire the next day by the steamship Hamburg (United Kingdom).
Eliza	United Kingdom	The ship was abandoned in the North Sea 20 nautical miles (37 km) east north east of North Foreland, Kent.
Emmanuel	United Kingdom	The ship was driven ashore near Thisted. Her crew were rescued. She was on a voyage from Hamburg to Aberdeen.
Esperance	Stettin	The ship was driven ashore at Swinemünde, Prussia. She was on a voyage from Newcastle upon Tyne, Northumberland, United Kingdom to Swinemünde.
Lily of the Valley	United Kingdom	The sloop ran aground at Woodbridge, Suffolk. She was on a voyage from Hull, Yorkshire to Woodbridge. She was refloated the next day.
Providencia	Stettin	The ship was wrecked on the Alsten Rock with the loss of all hands. She was on a voyage from Sunderland, County Durham, United Kingdom to Stettin.
Taymouth Castle	United Kingdom	The ship departed from Colombo, Ceylon for London. No further trace, presumed foundered with the loss of all hands.

== 28 November ==
List of shipwrecks: 28 November 1861
Ship	State	Description
Bessel	United Kingdom	The ship was driven ashore at "St. Thomas. She was on a voyage from Quebec City, Province of Canada, British North America to Hartlepool, County Durham. She was refloated and put back to Quebec City, arriving on 3 December.
Dahlia	United Kingdom	The sloop was abandoned in the North Sea 30 nautical miles (56 km) south of Flamborough Head, Yorkshire and foundered. Her crew were rescued by Cyrus (United Kingdom). Dahlia was on a voyage from Newcastle upon Tyne, Northumberland to Maidstone Kent.
Eliza	United Kingdom	The barque was abandoned in the English Channel 5 nautical miles (9.3 km) south west of the Beachy Head Lighthouse, Sussex. She was on a voyage from London to Cartagena, Spain. She was subsequently towed in to Calais, France.
Empress	United Kingdom	The ship was abandoned 10 nautical miles (19 km) off Skagen, Denmark. Her ten crew were rescued by the jacht Anne Geline (Norway). Empress was on a voyage from Kronstadt, Russia to South Shields, County Durham.
George Andrews	United Kingdom	The brig ran aground on the Cockle Sand, in the North Sea off the coast of Norfolk. She was on a voyage from Sunderland, County Durham to Portsmouth, Hampshire. She was refloated and put in to Great Yarmouth, Norfolk in a leaky condition.
Hendrika Gezina	Netherlands	The galiot was wrecked in Ballycotton Bay. Her crew survived. She was on a voyage from Taganrog, Russia to Cork, United Kingdom. She was later refloated and towed in to Queenstown, County Cork.
Hermes	Brazil	The steamship struck a submerged rock and foundered with the loss of about 470 lives. There were about 60 survivors. She was on a voyage from Rio de Janeiro to Macaé.
John Pink	United Kingdom	The ship was driven ashore at Father Point, Province of Canada, British North America. Her crew were rescued. She was on a voyage from Montreal, Province of Canada to Dublin.
Peerless	United States	The ship was wrecked on the coast of New Jersey. She was on a voyage from Bermuda to New York.
Peri	United Kingdom	The ship collided with Leo (United Kingdom) and sank in the English Channel off the coast of Devon. Her crew were rescued by Leo. Peri was on a voyage from London to São Miguel Island, Azores.

== 29 November ==
List of shipwrecks: 29 November 1861
Ship	State	Description
Bazaar	France	Colombian Civil War: The brig was captured at Buenaventura, Granadine Confederation whilst trying to run a blockade. She was run ashore and wrecked.
Comtesse de Regaville	France	The steamship collided with the steamship Zephyr (United Kingdom) and sank in the Irish Sea off Puffin Island, Anglesey, United Kingdom. Ten crew were reported missing. Six survivors were rescued by Zephyr. Comtesse de Ragaville was on a voyage from Nantes, Loire-Inférieure to Liverpool, Lancashire, United Kingdom.
Lesmahagow	United Kingdom	The ship was driven ashore and wrecked near Solva, Pembrokeshire. She was on a voyage from Quebec City, Province of Canada, British North America to Liverpool.
Margaretha Maria	Sweden	The ship put in to Kalvsund in a waterlogged condition. She was on a voyage from Soderhamn to London, United Kingdom.
Maria Louisa	France	The brigantine was discovered abandoned in the English Channel by Ellen (United Kingdom), which took her in tow. The tow line broke the next day and Maria Louisa was driven ashore and wrecked at Prawle Point, Devon, United Kingdom.
New Granadian	Granadine Confederation	Colombian Civil War: The schooner was run ashore and wrecked at the mouth of the Charambia. Her crew were captured by Mosquera forces and taken prisoner.

== 30 November ==
List of shipwrecks: 30 November 1861
Ship	State	Description
Anna Maria Catharina	Sweden	The ship ran aground and was wrecked off "Karingo". She was on a voyage from Newcastle upon Tyne, Northumberland, United Kingdom to Lysekil.
E. J. Waterman	Confederate States of America	American Civil War, Union blockade: The schooner, carrying a cargo of coffee, ran aground on Tybee Island, Georgia, and was captured by the sloop-of-war USS Savannah (United States Navy).
Forest Queen	United Kingdom	The ship ran aground on a reef off Baracoa, Cuba and was subsequently destroyed by fire with the loss of six lives. She was on a voyage from Coquimbo, Chile to Queenstown, County Cork.
Ivy	United Kingdom	The brig collided with the schooner Royalist (United Kingdom and sank in the North Sea off Cromer, Norfolk. Her crew took to a boat, and were rescued by Broadwood (United Kingdom). Ivy was on a voyage from Seaham, County Durham to London.
Marshall	United States	The schooner was wrecked off Guernsey, Channel Islands with the loss of two of her eight crew. She was on a voyage from New York to Havre de Grâce, Seine-Inférieure, France.
Norman	United States	Carrying a cargo of coal, the schooner was wrecked on Block Island off the coast of Rhode Island.
Superb	United Kingdom	The ship was wrecked on the Swedish coast. Her crew survived.

== Unknown date ==
List of shipwrecks: Unknown date in November 1861
Ship	State	Description
Agnetta	Kingdom of Hanover	The ship was wrecked on Juist. She was on a voyage from Grangemouth, Stirlingshire, United Kingdom to Leer.
Alert	United Kingdom	The ship was driven ashore at Cuddalore, India. She was on a voyage from Penang, Malaya to "Lagore".
Alliance	United Kingdom	The ship was driven ashore at Odesa.
Allison	United Kingdom	The ship was lost at Keelung, Formosa. Her crew were rescued.
Anna Catharina	Netherlands	The ship foundered in the North Sea before 25 November. Her crew were rescued by the steamship Ranger (United Kingdom). Anna Catharina was on a voyage from Middelburg, Zeeland to Newcastle upon Tyne, Northumberland, United Kingdom.
Annet	Belgium	The ship was abandoned in the North Sea. Her crew were rescued.
Aurora	United Kingdom	The ship was wrecked on the coast of Labrador, British North America before 10 November.
Brilliant	United Kingdom	The ship ran aground off Skagen, Denmark. She was on a voyage from Kronstadt, Russia to London. She was refloated and put in to Gothenburg, Sweden in a severely leaky condition.
Carl von Lynn	Brazil	The ship was wrecked at Morro de São Paulo before 18 November. She was on a voyage from Rio de Janeiro to Bahia.
Caroline	United Kingdom	The ship was abandoned in the North Sea in a waterlogged condition.. Her crew were rescued by Thor (Flag unknown). Caroline was on a voyage from Danzig to Whitehaven, Cumberland.
Diana	Netherlands	The ship was wrecked at Larvik, Norway. She was on a voyage from Amsterdam, North Holland to Königsberg, Prussia.
Elizabeth	United Kingdom	The ship was run down and sunk in the English Channel. Her crew were rescued. She was on a voyage from the River Tyne to Rio de Janeiro, Brazil.
Fairy	United Kingdom	The brig was wrecked at Saint Domingo. Her crew survived.
George	Norway	The ship was abandoned in the North Sea before 19 November. Her crew were rescued by the schooner Hermann (Russia). George was on a voyage from Plymouth, Devon, United Kingdom to Porsgrund.
Gina Reed	Flag unknown	The schooner was stranded at Stewarts Point, California, United States.
Hilda	Sweden	The schooner foundered before 25 November. Her crew were rescued by Alpha (Netherlands).
Hortensia	France	The ship was driven ashore near Løkken-Vrå, Denmark. Her crew were rescued. She was on a voyage from Bordeaux, Gironde to Gothenburg, Sweden.
Jeddo	United Kingdom	The steamship ran aground in the Yangtze Kiang.
Kate	United Kingdom	The ship was abandoned in the Humber.
Lena	United Kingdom	The barque was wrecked at Belize City, British Honduras.
Ludwig Gustav	Sweden	The ship was driven ashore at Sunk Island, Yorkshire, United Kingdom. She was on a voyage from Hull, Yorkshire to Stockholm. She was refloated and put back to Hull.
Mary Ann	United Kingdom	The ship was abandoned in the Atlantic Ocean before 12 November. Her crew were rescued. She was on a voyage from Pernambuco, Brazil to Queenstown, County Cork.
Orion	United Kingdom	The ship was wrecked on "Ockeen Island". She was on a voyage from Foochow to Shanghai, China.
Pearson	(United Kingdom of Great Britain and Ireland) Jersey	The ship was wrecked in the Rance before 13 November.
Peerless	United Kingdom	The ship was wrecked on the coast of New Jersey, United States.
Peter	United Kingdom	The ship was lost whilst on a voyage from Jakobstad to Gibraltar.
Plutus	Sweden	The ship was wrecked. Her crew were rescued. She was on a voyage from Gothenburg to Stettin.
Princess	United Kingdom	The brig was wrecked on the Barnard Sand, in the North Sea off the coast of Suffolk. Her eight crew survived. She was on a voyage from North Shields, Northumberland to London.
Regina	United Kingdom	The brig was wrecked in the Swin before 18 November. She was on a voyage from Kronstadt to Whitby, Yorkshire.
Reinha dos Açores	Portugal	The ship was wrecked on São Miguel Island, Azores.
Resource	French Navy	The transport ship was wrecked at Point San Antonio, Chile before 17 November. There were only six survivor of about 600 people on board.
Salopian	(United Kingdom of Great Britain and Ireland) New Zealand	The schooner was wrecked on a sandbar at the mouth of the Taieri River, New Zealand, sometime prior to 20 November.
Santa Clara	United States	American Civil War: Captured by the Confederate privateer Jefferson Davis in 1861, the 190-ton brig was sunk as a blockship by Confederate forces in the Savannah River in Georgia, probably near Fort Pulaski.
Seraphim	United Kingdom	The ship was wrecked on Cape Henry, Virginia, Confederate States of America.
Stephen Huntley	United Kingdom	The ship was driven ashore on the Dutch coast.
Sunshine	United Kingdom	The brig foundered in the North Sea. Her crew were rescued.
Thora Pauline	Denmark	The ship was driven ashore near Hobro before 19 November. She was on a voyage from Stege to Hull.
Uranus	United Kingdom	The ship ran aground in the River Mersey.
Four unidentified hulks	Confederate States of America	American Civil War: The four hulks were sunk as blockships by Confederate forces in a narrow channel in the Savannah River in Georgia just below Fort Pulaski.
Two unidentified vessels	United States	American Civil War: Two unidentified vessels captured by the Confederate privateer Jefferson Davis in 1861 were sunk as blockships along with the captured brig Santa Clara (United States) by Confederate forces in the Savannah River in Georgia, probably near Fort Pulaski.
