= USS Dart (1861) =

Gunboat of the United States Navy

History

United States
- Acquired: 4 July 1861
- In service: 1861
- Out of service: 1861
- Fate: scrapped, 1861

General characteristics
- Displacement: 94 tons
- Propulsion: sail
- Armament: one 12-pounder howitzer

USS Dart was a captured Confederate schooner acquired by the Union Navy during the American Civil War. She was put into service by the Union Navy to serve as a tender for other Union Navy ships. However, she was also able to capture several "prizes" on her own before she was dismantled and scrapped.

== Service history ==
Dart was a small schooner captured by the screw steamer South Carolina off Galveston, Texas, on 4 July 1861. Though never labeled or purchased by the Navy, she was armed with a 12-pounder howitzer, and cruised as tender to both South Carolina and the screw steamer Huntsville. During her brief service, she captured several small vessels, including schooners Cecilia on 24 September 1861, and Zavala on 1 October. Dart was taken out of service, and dismantled by men from the screw frigate Niagara off the southwest pass of the Mississippi River, between 19 and 21 October 1861.
