= French frigate Infernal =

Wooden-hulled paddle frigate of the French Navy

History

France
- Name: Infernal
- Laid down: 7 December 1839
- Launched: 1 May 1843
- Christened: Infernal
- Decommissioned: 14 December 1861
- Fate: Burnt by accident in October 1861.

General characteristics
- Displacement: 1,600 tonnes
- Propulsion: sails / steam engine
- Armament: 8 guns
- Armour: Timber

Infernal was a wooden-hulled paddle frigate of the French Navy.

The ship took part in the Crimean War.

She was eventually burnt by accident at Valparaíso on 1 October 1861.
