= USS South Wind =

Schooner

USS South Wind (1861) was a schooner purchased by the Union Navy on 13 August 1861 at Baltimore, Maryland, for the "Stone Fleet" of American Civil War fame.

These ships, heavily laden with stone, were sunk in the channel approaches to leading Southern ports in order to block maritime trade of the Confederate States of America.

On 11 October 1861, South Wind, along with four other vessels, was sunk in the Ocracoke Inlet, North Carolina, an entrance to Pamlico Sound.

== See also ==
- Union blockade
