= Skull Creek (Beaufort County, South Carolina) =

Archaeological site in South Carolina, United States

- U.S. National Register of Historic Places
- Nearest city: Hilton Head, South Carolina
- Area: 2 acres (0.81 ha)
- MPS: Historic Resources of the Late Archaic-Early Woodland Period Shell Rings of South Carolina, ca. 1,000-2,200 years B.C.
- NRHP reference No.: 70000564
- Added to NRHP: November 10, 1970

Skull Creek is a historic archeological site located at Hilton Head Island, Beaufort County, South Carolina. It was listed in the National Register of Historic Places in 1970.

The site includes two of 20 or more prehistoric Native American shell middens in a ring shape located from the central coast of South Carolina to the central coast of Georgia. It probably dates from early in the second millennium BC, and is likely to contain some of the earliest pottery known in North America. The Skull Creek rings are the only known example of a later ring superimposed over an earlier one.
