= USS Sam Houston (1861) =

Gunboat of the United States Navy

History

United States
- Captured: 7 July 1861
- Fate: Sold, 25 April 1866

General characteristics
- Displacement: 66 tons
- Propulsion: schooner sail
- Complement: 15
- Armament: one heavy 12-pounder smoothbore cannon

USS Sam Houston was a small (66-ton) schooner captured by the Union Navy during the beginning of the American Civil War.

She served the Union Navy during the blockade of ports and waterways of the Confederate States of America as a ship's tender, pilot boat, and dispatch boat, but also as a gunboat when the occasion presented itself.

== Service history ==
Sam Houston, also called Samuel Houston, was a small schooner which, before the Civil War, had operated along the Texas coast. During the first months of the conflict, she served as a pilot boat. On 18 June 1861, Secretary of the Navy Gideon Welles was warned that the little schooner was about to sail from Galveston, Texas, to carry $100,000 in gold to Havana, Cuba, to purchase "arms and munitions of war." On 7 July 1861, USS South Carolina captured Sam Houston off Galveston.

Comdr. James Alden, took her into the Federal Navy as a ship's tender. She served the Gulf Blockading Squadron, for the most part as a dispatch vessel, operating between Pensacola Bay and blockading ships stationed along the U.S. Gulf coast. No records have been found giving details of her commissioning; but, late in October 1862, she was commanded by Acting Master George W. Wood.

On 2 October 1861, she captured 4-ton schooner, Reindeer, off San Luis Pass, Texas. She removed its cargo of salt before sinking the prize. The Report of the Secretary of the Navy for 1865 states that Sam Houston was entitled to share in the capture of schooner, Solidad Cos, taken by South Carolina on 11 September. After Federal naval jurisdiction in the Gulf of Mexico was divided early in 1862, Sam Houston operated in the West Gulf Blockading Squadron, performing widely varied duties through the end of the war. For almost a year after peace returned, she served as a pilot boat of the Gulf Squadron. She was sold at New Orleans, Louisiana, on 25 April 1866 to J.B. Walton.
