= USS Rescue (1861) =

Gunboat of the United States Navy

History

United States
- Laid down: date unknown
- Launched: 1861 at; Wilmington, Delaware
- Acquired: 21 August 1861
- Commissioned: circa 21 August 1861
- Decommissioned: 1889
- Stricken: 1891 (est.)
- Home port: Washington Navy Yard
- Fate: Sold on 25 March 1891

General characteristics
- Displacement: 111 tons
- Length: 80 ft (24 m)
- Beam: 18 ft (5.5 m)
- Draught: 8 ft (2.4 m)
- Propulsion: steam engine; screw-propelled
- Speed: 6 knots
- Complement: not known
- Armament: one 20-pounder Parrott rifle; one 12-pounder gun

USS Rescue was a small (111-ton) steamer commissioned by the United States Navy during the American Civil War.

She served the Union Navy during the blockade of ports and waterways of the Confederate States of America as a gunboat and dispatch boat. After the war's end, Rescue continued to serve the Navy, but this time as a tugboat and as a fireboat.

== Fitted out in Philadelphia in 1861 ==
Rescue, built for the builders account in 1861 by Harlan and Hollingsworth, Wilmington, Delaware, was purchased for the Navy on 21 August 1861; fitted out at Philadelphia, Pennsylvania; and ordered to join the Potomac Flotilla.

== Civil War service ==
=== Potomac River patrol ===
Rescue joined the flotilla prior to mid-September and took up station near Alexandria, Virginia. By the 18th, she had shifted to the Mathias Point-Popes Creek area where she seized the schooner Harford and her cargo of wheat and tobacco.

On 11 October, the gunboat, with USS Resolute and USS Union, captured and burned the schooner Martha Washington which had been awaiting Confederate troops in Quantico (Dumfries) Creek. Ten days later, she returned to Mathias Point to engage enemy batteries there.

A week of courier duty followed; and, on the 28th, she was detached from the Potomac Flotilla and ordered to the Rappahannock River for duty in the North Atlantic Blockading Squadron.

=== Assigned to the North Atlantic blockade ===
On 6 November she captured and burned the schooner Ada at Corrotman Creek and, on the 8th, seized the ammunition storage ship Urbana. At midmonth she was ordered to Hampton Roads, Virginia, where she assumed tug and patrol duties which took her into 1862. In October 1862 she moved up to Washington, D.C. for repairs, after which she got underway for Port Royal, South Carolina, and duty in Samuel Francis Du Pont's squadron, then blockading Charleston, South Carolina.

Rescue arrived at Port Royal early in November. Through the summer of 1863, she performed tug and patrol duties in the anchorage area and in September shifted to Charleston. In October she returned to Port Royal to continue tug and patrol duties there until June 1864 when she was ordered to Baltimore, Maryland, for repairs.

On 2 September, she departed Baltimore and shortly thereafter resumed duty with the Potomac Flotilla. Stationed in the St. Mary's area, Rescue remained in the Potomac Flotilla through the end of the Civil War.

== Post-Civil War service ==
She then proceeded to Washington, D.C., where for the next 24 years she served as a district craft, first as a tug, then as a fireboat. Declared unserviceable in 1889, she was condemned and sold on 25 March 1891.
