= Le Vivier-sur-Mer =

Le Vivier-sur-Mer Le Vivier (Gallo) Gwiver (Breton)
- Commune
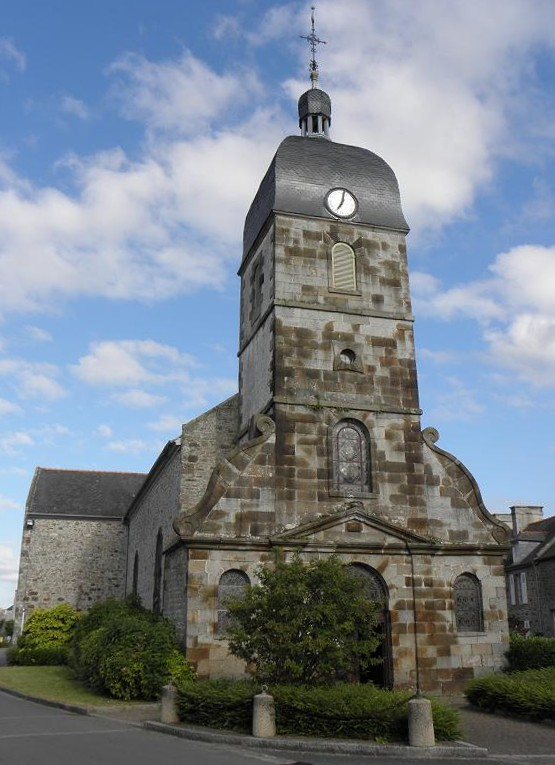
- Saint Nicolas church

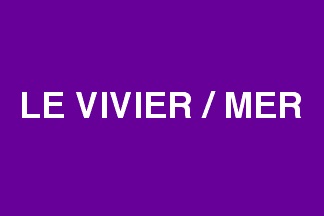
- Flag Coat of arms
- Location of Le Vivier-sur-Mer
- Location within France Location within Brittany
- Coordinates: 48°36′10″N 1°46′23″W
- Country: France
- Region: Brittany
- Department: Ille-et-Vilaine
- Arrondissement: Saint-Malo
- Canton: Dol-de-Bretagne
- Intercommunality: Pays de Dol et Baie du Mont Saint-Michel

Government
  - Mayor (2020–2026): Carole Cerveau
- Area^{1}: 2.24 km^{2} (0.86 sq mi)
- Highest elevation: 8 m (26 ft)
- Lowest elevation: 3 m (9.8 ft)
- Population (2023): 1,065
  - Density: 475/km^{2} (1,230/sq mi)
- Time zone: UTC+01:00 (CET)
  - Summer (DST): UTC+02:00 (CEST)
- INSEE/Postal code: 35361 /35960
- ^{1} French Land Register data, which excludes lakes, ponds, glaciers > 1 km^{2} (0.386 sq mi or 247 acres) and river estuaries.

Le Vivier-sur-Mer (French pronunciation: [lə vivje syʁ mɛʁ], literally Le Vivier on Sea; Breton: Gwiver; Gallo: Le Vivier) is a commune in the Ille-et-Vilaine department of Brittany in north-western France.

== Population ==
Inhabitants of Le Vivier-sur-Mer are called in French vivarais.

Historical population
Year	Pop.	±% p.a.
1968	793	—
1975	753	−0.74%
1982	914	+2.81%
1990	1,012	+1.28%
1999	1,009	−0.03%
2007	1,037	+0.34%
2012	1,029	−0.15%
2017	1,039	+0.19%
2023	1,065	+0.41%
Source: INSEE

== See also ==
- Communes of the Ille-et-Vilaine department
