= USS South Carolina (1860) =

Gunboat of the United States Navy

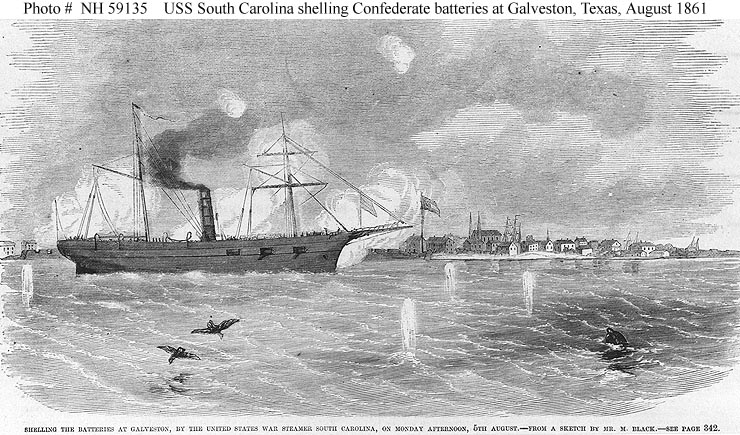
- USS South Carolina 1861

History

United States
- Name: USS South Carolina
- Namesake: South Carolina
- Launched: 1860
- Acquired: 3 May 1861
- Commissioned: 22 May 1861
- Decommissioned: 8 April 1862
- In service: 16 June 1862
- Out of service: 17 August 1866
- Fate: Sold, 5 October 1866

General characteristics
- Displacement: 1,165 tons
- Length: 217 ft 11.5 in (66.434 m)
- Beam: 33 ft 6 in (10.21 m)
- Draft: 14 ft 6 in (4.42 m)
- Depth of hold: 25 ft (7.6 m)
- Propulsion: steam engine; screw-propelled
- Speed: 12 knots (22 km/h; 14 mph)
- Complement: 115
- Armament: 4 × 8 in (203 mm) guns; 1 × 32-pounder gun

USS South Carolina was a steamer used by the Union Navy during the American Civil War.

She was used by the Navy as a gunboat to patrol navigable waterways of the Confederacy to prevent the South from trading with other countries. Post-war she was converted into a cargo ship prior to being decommissioned.

== Service history ==
South Carolina, a screw steamer built at Boston, Massachusetts, in 1860, was purchased by the Navy at Boston on 3 May 1861 and commissioned at the Boston Navy Yard on 22 May 1861, Capt. James Alden in command. The steamer departed Boston on 24 May 1861 and carried ordnance and ammunition to Pensacola, Florida. She joined the Gulf Blockading Squadron at Berwick Bay, Louisiana, on 24 June 1861 and then took station off Galveston, Texas. On 4 July, she celebrated Independence Day there by capturing six small schooners. She took two more the next day and one each on the 6th and 7th. South Carolina engaged Confederate batteries at Galveston on 3 August. On 11 September, she made a prize of Galveston steamer Anna Taylor, laden with coffee and masquerading as the Tampico ship, Solodad Cos. She captured schooners Ezilda and Joseph H. Toone off Southwest Pass on 4 October; and, on the 16th, took Edward Barnard, after that British schooner had run the blockade out of Mobile, Alabama, with 600 barrels of turpentine. On 17 October, she joined the USS Vincennes in pursuit of the CSS Ivy up the Southwest Pass of the Mississippi. She fired on the Ivy, and one other Confederate steamer, but both escaped.

Sloop Florida fell prey to the vigilant blockader on 11 December. On 19 February 1862, South Carolina and USS Brooklyn chased steamer Magnolia in the Gulf of Mexico after the steamer had slipped away from the Confederate coast carrying a large cargo of cotton. Magnolia's crew exploded one of her boilers, set her afire, and attempted to escape; but South Carolina captured the Southerner's boats, boarded the flaming steamer, and put out the fire. In March, South Carolina received orders to return to Boston where she was decommissioned on 8 April for badly needed repairs. Recommissioned on 16 June, the steamer was reassigned to the South Atlantic Blockading Squadron; departed Boston four days later; and joined the blockade off Charleston, South Carolina, on the 16th. She served in that squadron until the closing weeks of the Civil War. South Carolina destroyed abandoned schooner Patriot aground near Mosquito Inlet, Florida, on 27 August; and captured schooner Nellie off Port Royal, South Carolina, on 27 March 1863.

Departing Charleston on 9 March 1865, South Carolina entered the Philadelphia Navy Yard on the 15th and was decommissioned there on the 25th to be fitted out as a store ship. Recommissioned on 17 June, the ship sailed on 4 July to carry stores to ships at Port Royal, Key West, and Pensacola, Florida. She returned to Philadelphia on the last day of July and, during the next year, made four more similar logistic cruises. After returning to New York from her last voyage on 20 July 1866, South Carolina was decommissioned at the New York Navy Yard on 17 August 1866 and was sold at public auction at New York on 5 October 1866. Redocumented Juniata on 24 December 1866, the former blockader remained long in merchant service. She was reduced to a schooner barge on 8 April 1893 and soon after vanished from maritime records.

== Notes ==
Abbreviations used in these notes
Official atlas: Atlas to accompany the official records of the Union and Confederate armies.
ORA (Official records, armies): War of the Rebellion: a compilation of the official records of the Union and Confederate Armies.
ORN (Official records, navies): Official records of the Union and Confederate Navies in the War of the Rebellion.
