= List of shipwrecks of North Carolina =

Shipwrecks sunk off the shore.

This is a list of shipwrecks located off the coast of North Carolina.

Ship	Flag	Sunk date	Notes	Coordinates
USS Aeolus	United States Navy	August 1988	Sunk as an artificial reef.	34°16.685′N 76°38.659′W
Adventure	Pirate	10 June 1718	Sloop under the command of Blackbeard. Ran aground attempting to kedge Queen Anne's Revenge off the bar near Beaufort Inlet, North Carolina.	
Allan Jackson	United States	18 January 1942	American tanker; torpedoed off Hatteras by U-66.	35°37′N 74°20′W
USS Alligator	United States Navy	2 April 1863	Submarine; Sank off of Cape Hatteras.	
Altoona		22 October 1878	Ran aground at Cape Hatteras.	
Amerikaland	Sweden	3 February 1942	Swedish freighter; torpedoed off Cape Hatteras by U-106.	36°36′N 74°10′W
CSS Appomattox	Confederate States Navy	10 February 1862	Steamboat that was scuttled to prevent capture near Elizabeth City.	
Ario		15 March 1942	Torpedoed off Cape Lookout by U-158.	34.33°N 76.65°W
Ashkhabad	USSR	29 April 1942	Soviet tanker; torpedoed by U-402 off Cape Lookout.	34°21.908′N 76°21.081′W
Arabutan	Brazil	7 March 1942	Brazilian freighter; torpedoed off Hatteras by U-155.	
USS Aster	United States Navy	7 October 1864	Ran aground at Kure Beach.	
USS Atik	United States Navy	26 March 1942	Q-ship; torpedoed by U-123.	34°52′N 69°58′W
USS Atlanta	United States Navy	December 1869	Ironclad warship that sank off Cape Hatteras.	35.25458°N 75.51995°W
Atlas	United States	9 April 1942	American tanker; torpedoed off Cape Lookout by U-552.	34.45°N 76.27°W
Australia	United States	16 March 1942	American tanker; torpedoed off Cape Hatteras by U-332.	35.12°N 75.37°W
USS Bainbridge	United States Navy	21 August 1863	Capsized off Cape Hatteras.	
USS Bazely	United States Navy	9 December 1864	Sank in Roanoke River near Jamseville after striking a mine while attempting to aid USS Otsego.	
HMT Bedfordshire	Royal Navy	11 May 1942	Anti-submarine trawler torpedoed by German submarine U-588 off the coast of Ocracoke Island.	34°10′N 76°41′W
USCGC Bedloe	United States Coast Guard	September 1944	Formerly USCGC Antietam; sank off Oregon Inlet in the 1944 Great Atlantic Hurricane.	
CSS Bendigo	Confederate States Navy	January 1864	Iron-hulled sidewheel blockade runner; ran aground in Lockwood's Folly Inlet.	
CSS Black Warrior	Confederate States Navy	20 February 1859	Burned at Elizabeth City.	
Bluefields	Nicaragua	15 July 1942	Nicaraguan freighter; torpedoed off Cape Hatteras by U-576.	
Bounty	United States	29 October 2012	Replica of the original HMS Bounty. Sank during Hurricane Sandy with 16 people aboard.	33°54′N 73°50′W
British Splendour	United Kingdom	7 April 1942	British tanker; torpedoed by U-552 off the coast of Ocracoke Island.	35.07°N 75.19°W
Buarque	Brazil	15 February 1942	Brazilian passenger and cargo ship; torpedoed by U-432.	36.58°N 75.33°W
Byron D. Benson		4 May 1942	Tanker; torpedoed by U-552.	
Carroll A. Deering	United States	January 1921	Five-masted commercial schooner that ran aground in late January off the coast of Cape Hatteras. When the wreck was discovered and boarded, it was found to have been completely abandoned. Its crew were never heard from again.	35.262440°N 75.491695°W
Caribsea		11 March 1942	Torpedoed by U-158 off Cape Lookout.	34.67°N 76.16°W
Carl Gerhard		23 September 1929	Ran aground off Kill Devil Hills, North Carolina.	
Cassimer		26 February 1942	Sank following collision with Lara off Cape Lookout.	
Catherine M. Monahan		24 August 1910	Four-masted schooner; foundered after running aground on Diamond Shoals.	
Central America	United States	12 September 1857	Sidewheel steamer carrying 10 tons of gold when it was caught up in a Category 2 hurricane.	31°35′N 77°02′W
Chilore		15 July 1942	Freighter; torpedoed by U-576 and subsequently ran aground off Cape Hatteras.	
USS Chopper	United States Navy	21 July 1976	Sunk off Cape Hatteras, while being rigged as a tethered underwater target.	
Ciltvaira	Latvia	19 January 1942	Latvian freighter; torpedoed off Nags Head.	34°58′N 75°10′W
City of Atlanta	United States	19 January 1942	American freighter; torpedoed by U-123.	35.7°N 75.35°W
City of Houston	United States	23 October 1878	Foundered off Frying Pan Shoals in a storm.	
USS Columbia	United States Navy	14 January 1863	Ran aground off Masonboro Inlet.	
USS Comte de Grasse	United States Navy	7 June 2006	Sunk as a target, along with her sister ship, Stump.	
CSS Curlew	Confederate States Navy	7 February 1862	Sunk in battle off Roanoke Island.	35.88565°N 75.76131°W
USS Cythera	United States Navy	2 May 1942	Patrol boat that was torpedoed by U-402.	33°30′N 75°40′W
USS Dionysus	United States Navy	1978	Sunk off Pea Island as an artificial reef.	
Dixie Arrow	United States	26 March 1942	American tanker; torpedoed off Cape Hatteras by U-71.	34.98°N 75.55°W
CSS Ellis	Confederate States Navy	24 November 1862	Gunboat that ran aground in New River and was destroyed to prevent capture.	34.7179°N 77.4254°W
E.M. Clark	United States	18 March 1942	American tanker; torpedoed off Diamond Shoals by U-124.	34.84°N 75.58°W
Empire Gem	United Kingdom	24 January 1942	British tanker; torpedoed off Diamond Shoals by U-66.	35°06′N 74°58′W
Empire Thrush		14 April 1942	Torpedoed by U-203.	
Equipoise	Panama	27 March 1942	Panamanian freighter; torpedoed by U-160.	36.6°N 74.75°W
Esso Nashville	United States	21 March 1942	American tanker; torpedoed by U-124; stern section was salvaged.	33.58°N 77.37°W
Explorer		12 December 1919	A tugboat that sunk off Nags Head.	
CSS Fanny	Confederate States Navy	10 February 1862	Steamboat and balloon carrier that ran aground near Elizabeth City.	
CSS Forrest	Confederate States Navy	10 February 1862	Gunboat that was burned to prevent capture at Elizabeth City.	
F.W. Abrams	United States	15 June 1942	American tanker; struck a naval mine at Diamond Shoals.	
Fenwick Island		7 December 1968	Foundered in a storm.	
Francis E. Waters		23 October 1889	Blown ashore by a storm, and now on display at Nags Head town hall.	35°56.067′N 075°36.721′W
G.A. Kohler		23 August 1933	Victim of the 1933 Chesapeake–Potomac hurricane. Wrecked two miles (3.2 km) south of Gull Shoal Coast Guard Station. Nine men and one woman from the ship were saved by breeches buoy.	35.469°N 75.481°W
General E. L. F. Hardcastle		17 August 1899	Merchant sailing vessel; sank during the 1899 San Ciriaco hurricane in Pamlico Sound.	
George E. Klinck	United States	7 March 1941	American lumber schooner; foundered in a storm near Diamond Shoals Lightship.	
George Weems		20 May 1909	Burned and sank off Frying Pan Shoals.	
Glanayron	United Kingdom	22 May 1896	British cargo ship; ran aground on outer Diamond Shoals.	
Governor Ames	United States	13 December 1909	Schooner that was wrecked in a gale off Cape Hatteras.	35.727°N 75.340°W
Gray Ghost			Sunk and later recovered near Belhaven.	
Helen H. Benedict		1914	Wooden schooner; ran aground two miles south of Nag's Head.	
Hereford	Norway	April 1907	Norwegian barque; wrecked off Hatteras Island.	
Hesperides	United Kingdom	9 October 1897	British cargo ship; stranded on Diamond Shoals.	
Home	United States	10 October 1837	Steam packet ship wrecked off the beach of Ocracoke Island, North Carolina, in the 1837 Racer's Storm hurricane.	35.2451°N 75.5146°W
USS Home	United States	12 October 1870	Steamship that sank off Cape Hatteras.	
USS Huron	United States	24 November 1877	Ran aground off Nags Head.	
Idaho		18 February 1895	The paddle steamer foundered in a storm while under tow	
USS Indra	United States Navy	4 August 1992	Sunk as artificial reef.	
USS Iron Age	United States Navy	11 January 1864	Ran aground at Lockwood's Folly Inlet while attempting to refloat CSS Bendigo.	
Isle of Iona	United Kingdom	14 December 1914	British cargo ship; wrecked near Hatteras Inlet.	
USCGC Jackson	United States Coast Guard	September 1944	Sank off Oregon Inlet in the 1944 Great Atlantic Hurricane.	
John D. Gill		12 March 1942	Torpedoed by U-158.	
John Hunter		10 October 1910	Disappeared off Cape Hatteras.	
Kassandra Louloudis	Greece	17 March 1942	Greek cargo ship; torpedoed off Diamond Shoals by U-124.	
Kentucky	United States	4 February 1910	The 996-gross register ton and 203-foot (62 m) long steamer headed from New York to the Pacific Coast for Tacoma to Alaska service. Leaking, she stopped for repairs at Newport News, Virginia where she was deemed seaworthy. She developed catastrophic leaks and sank 110 nautical miles (200 km; 130 mi) off North Carolina. The use of radio to communicate "S.O.S." messages were among the first recorded, saving 46 lives.	32.46°N 76.42°W
USS Keshena	United States Navy	19 July 1942	Naval tug; struck a naval mine off Cape Hatteras while attempting to rescue Chilore.	
Koll	Norway	6 April 1942	Norwegian tanker; torpedoed by U-571.	
Kyzickes			Ran aground near Kill Devil Hills.	
Lancing	Norway	7 April 1942	Norwegian tanker; torpedoed by U-552 off Cape Hatteras.	
Laura A. Barnes			Ran ashore on Coquina Beach.	
Liberator		19 March 1942	Freighter; torpedoed off Diamond Shoals by U-552.	35.08°N 75.50°W
Ljubica Matkovic	Yugoslavia	24 June 1942	Yugoslavian freighter; torpedoed by U-404.	
Lois Joyce			Sank in surf in Oregon Inlet.	
USS Louisiana	United States Navy	24 December 1864	Set afire and exploded at Fort Fisher.	
USS Mahackemo	United States Navy	11 September 1948	Sank off Cape Hatteras while under tow.	
Malchace	United States	9 April 1942	American freighter; torpedoed by U-160.	34.47°N 75.93°W
Manuela	United States	25 June 1942	American freighter; torpedoed off Cape Lookout by U-404.	
USS Margaret	United States Navy	14 April 1942	Cargo ship that was sunk by U-571 off Cape Hatteras.	35.2°N 75.23°W
Marlin	Liberia	18 October 1965	Liberian cargo ship; foundered after her cargo shifted.	
Marore		27 February 1942	Torpedoed off Kinnakeet station by U-432.	35.55°N 74.97°W
Merak	United States	6 August 1918	American tanker; ran aground on Diamond Shoals while avoiding torpedoes from U-140.	
Metropolis		1878	Sunk off Corolla.	
Mirlo		16 August 1918	Torpedoed by U-117 off Wimble Shoal Buoy.	
Modern Greece		1862	Sunk at Kure Beach.	
USS Monitor	United States Navy	31 December 1862	Lost off Cape Hatteras while under tow by USS Rhode Island.	35°0′6″N 75°24′23″W
Naeco		23 March 1942	Tanker; torpedoed off Cape Lookout by U-124.	
CSS Neuse	Confederate States Navy	March 1865	Burned to avoid capture in Neuse River; currently installed at the CSS Neuse Civil War Interpretive Center in downtown Kinston.	35°16′1.33″N 77°37′17.8″W
USS New Jersey	United States Navy	5 September 1923	Bombed as a target off Cape Hatteras.	
Nordal	Panama	25 June 1942	Panamanian cargo ship; torpedoed by U-404.	
Normannia		17 January 1924	Foundered in a storm at Frying Pan Shoals.	
Northeastern	United States	30 December 1904	American tanker; ran aground on Diamond Shoals.	
Norvana	United States	19 January 1942	American freighter; torpedoed off Cape Hatteras by U-123.	
CSS North Carolina	Confederate States Navy	27 September 1864	Gunboat that sank off Southport.	33°54′49″N 78°1′8″W
Olympic	Panama	22 January 1942	Panamanian tanker; torpedoed off Hatteras by U-130.	36°01′N 75°30′W
Oriental		16 May 1862	Sank near Oregon Inlet.	
USS Otsego	United States Navy	9 December 1864	Sank in the Roanoke River after striking two mines near Jamesville.	
Papoose	United States	19 March 1942	Tanker; torpedoed and sank off Oregon Inlet.	34°17′N 76°39′W
USS Peterhoff	United States Navy	6 March 1864	Mistaken for a blockade runner and rammed by USS Monticello off Kure Beach.	
Pevensey	Confederate States		Blockade runner, sank off Atlantic Beach.	
Phantom	Confederate States	1863	Steel-hulled blockade runner; sunk at Topsail Inlet.	
USS Pilgrim	United States	1935	Patrol vessel that was scuttled off Harkers Island as a breakwater.	34.71226°N 76.58878°W
Porta Allegra			Dredge; sank for unknown reasons.	
Portland			Ran aground at Cape Lookout.	
Proteus		19 August 1918	Sank following a collision with the tanker Cushing in heavy fog, southwest of Diamond Shoals.	34°45.918′N 75°47.010′W
Pulaski	United States	14 June 1838	The American steam packet Pulaski was lost thirty miles off the coast of North Carolina when its starboard boiler exploded.	
Queen Anne's Revenge	Pirate	10 June 1718	French frigate that was captured by pirates and became Blackbeard's flagship, eventually running aground at Beaufort Inlet. She was discovered in 1996, near Atlantic Beach by Intersal, Inc.	
CSS Raleigh	Confederate States Navy	7 May 1864	Ran aground at Cape Fear.	
El Salvador	Spain	29 August 1750	Spanish merchantman ran aground during a hurricane near Beaufort Inlet, North Carolina	34°41.44′N 76°41.20′W
San Delfino	United Kingdom	9 April 1942	British tanker; torpedoed by U-203.	
Santiago	United States	12 March 1924	American cargo and passenger ship; foundered off Cape Hatteras in a storm.	
USS Schurz	United States Navy	21 June 1918	Sank in a collision with Florida.	
CSS Sea Bird	Confederate States Navy	10 February 1862	Rammed and sunk by USS Commodore Perry off Elizabeth City.	36.285242°N 76.175079°W
HMT Senateur Duhamel	Royal Navy	5 June 1942	Rammed by USS Semmes which mistook it for a U-boat.	
USS South Wind	United States Navy	11 October 1861	Schooner that was scuttled in the Ocracoke Inlet.	
Southern Isles	United States	5 October 1951	American bulk carrier; broke apart and sank.	
USS Southfield	United States Navy	19 April 1864	Sank following collision with CSS Albemarle on the Roanoke River, near its mouth at Albemarle Sound.	
USCGC Spar	United States Coast Guard	October 2004	Scuttled in 108 feet (33 m) of water, 30 miles (48 km) off Morehead City, as an artificial reef.	
HMCS St. Laurent	Canadian Maritime Forces	12 January 1980	Canadian destroyer; sank off Cape Hatteras while under tow to breakers.	
Strathairly		24 March 1891	Ran aground near Chicomacomico.	
Stormy Petrel		1864	Iron-hulled sidewheel blockade runner; sunk at Kure Beach.	
Suloide	Brazil	26 March 1943	Brazilian cargo ship; sank after striking the submerged wreck of W. E. Hutton.	
Tamaulipas	United States	10 April 1942	American tanker; torpedoed off Cape Lookout by U-552.	34.42°N 76.0°W
USS Tarpon	United States Navy	8 June 1957	Foundered off Cape Hatteras.	34°45.195′N 75°46.025′W
Theodore Parker		4 June 1974	Sunk as an artificial reef.	
Tiger	United States	1 April 1942	American tanker; torpedoed by U-754	
USS Tiru	United States Navy	19 July 1979	Balao-class submarine sunk as a target off Cape Hatteras.	36°N 73°W
U-352	Kriegsmarine	9 May 1942	Sunk by depth charges from USCGC Icarus.	34°21′N 76°35′W
U-576	Kriegsmarine	15 July 1942	Sunk off Hatteras by depth charges from aircraft and gunfire from SS Unicoi.	34.51°N 75.22°W
U-701	Kriegsmarine	7 July 1942	Sunk off Cape Hatteras by depth charges from aircraft.	35°14.330′N 75°06.690′W
U-85	Kriegsmarine	14 April 1942	Sunk off Bodie Island by gunfire from USS Roper.	35.55°N 75.13°W
Ulysses	United Kingdom	11 April 1942	British passenger and cargo ship; torpedoed by U-160 south of Cape Hatteras.	
USS Underwriter	United States Navy	2 February 1864	Captured and burned by Confederate forces off New Bern.	
Valour	United States	18 January 2006	Sank in a storm	
Venore	United States	23 January 1942	American freighter; torpedoed off Hatteras by U-66.	34°50′N 75°20′W
Veturia	United Kingdom	20 February 1918	British freighter; ran aground on Diamond Shoals in fog.	
USS Virginia	United States Navy	5 September 1923	Bombed as target off Cape Hatteras.	
W.E. Hutton	United States	18 March 1942	American fuel tanker; torpedoed by U-124 off Cape Lookout.	34.08°N 76.67°W
West Ivis	United States	25 January 1942	American freighter; torpedoed off Hatteras by U-125.	35°03′N 73°10′W
EM (Note: "EM" was a Coast Guard prefix for "Emergency Manning" ships, not technically USCG cutters but chartered for patrols.) Wilcox		30 September 1943	Foundered off Nags Head in a storm.	
William Rockefeller	United States	28 June 1942	American tanker, torpedoed by U-701.	35°14′11″N 75°2′1″W
USS Yancey	United States Navy	1990	Sunk as an artificial reef off Morehead City.	
York		22 January 1942	Freighter; torpedoed by U-66.	
Zane Gray	United States	1974	Liberty ship sunk off Pea Island as an artificial reef.	
