= USS Umpqua (AT-25) =

US Navy tugboat (1919–1946)

- USS Umpqua on the Cooper River, just outside of Charleston, on 3 August 1942

History

United States
- Name: Umpqua
- Namesake: Umpqua River in Oregon
- Owner: United States Navy (1919–1946); United States Maritime Commission (1946)
- Builder: Ferguson Steel and Iron Company
- Cost: $550,000
- Laid down: 19 February 1919
- Launched: 18 September 1919
- Commissioned: 6 December 1919
- Decommissioned: 24 May 1946
- In service: 1919–1946
- Reclassified: 17 July 1920 (to AT-25); 15 May 1944 (to ATO-25)
- Stricken: 3 July 1946
- Home port: Charleston, South Carolina
- Identification: Fleet Tug No. 25 (1919–1920); AT-25 (1920–1944); ATO-25 (1944–1946); Visual identifier: GJLH (1919–1932); IRCS call sign: NATS (1932–1946)
- Honors and awards: American Defense Service Medal; American Campaign Medal; World War II Victory Medal
- Fate: Sold to Salmons Dredging Company on 4 December 1946

United States
- Name: Umpqua
- Namesake: Umpqua River in Oregon
- Owner: Salmons Dredging Company (1946-Unknown)
- Cost: $2,500
- Acquired: 4 December 1946
- In service: 1946–Unknown

General characteristics
- Class & type: Bagaduce-class tugboat
- Tonnage: Tons-per-inch immersion: 1,056
- Displacement: 998 long tons (1,014 t)
- Length: 156.67 ft (47.75 m) (overall); 144 ft (44 m) (at waterline)
- Beam: 30 ft (9.1 m)
- Draft: 15.67 ft (4.78 m)
- Installed power: 2 x triple-expansion steam engine; 2 x Babcock & Wilcox header-type boilers; 2 x diesel-driven service generators
- Propulsion: 1 screw
- Speed: 12.8 knots (23.7 km/h; 14.7 mph)
- Capacity: 1,830 bbl (291 m^{3})
- Complement: 5 officers, 56 enlisted
- Armament: 2 x machine guns

USS Umpqua (AT-25) was a Bagaduce-class tugboat operated by the United States Navy from 1919 until 1946. She operated out of Charleston, South Carolina.

== Construction ==
The construction of Umpqua was authorized to the Ferguson Steel and Iron Company on 4 March 1917, and the contract to build her was signed on 21 May 1918. The tugboat was laid down on 19 February 1919 at Buffalo, New York, constructed by the Ferguson Steel and Iron Company. She was launched on 18 September and commissioned at Buffalo on 6 December. The contract price of her hull and machinery was a total of $550,000.

=== Specifications ===
Umpqua had an overall length of 156.67 feet (47.75 m), a waterline length of 144 feet (44 m), a beam of 30 feet (9.1 m), and a draft of 15.67 feet (4.78 m). She had a maximum speed of 12.8 knots (23.7 km/h; 14.7 mph). She was powered by one vertical triple-expansion steam engine, fueled by two Babcock & Wilcox header-type boilers that produced 220 pounds per square inch (1,500,000 Pa). She also had two diesel-driven service generators that produced 25 kilowatts of power. She was driven by a single propeller and produced 1,800 horsepower (1,300 kW).

Her fuel capacity was 1,830 barrels (291 m^{3}), her largest boom capacity was 5 tons. She carried a complement of 5 officers and 56 enlisted, and was armed with two machine guns. Her displacement was 998 long tons (1,014 t) and her tons-per-inch immersion was 9 tons.

== Service history ==
Umpqua operated out of Charleston, South Carolina, servicing the Sixth Naval District. She primarily performed heavy-duty towing and tug operations for the Atlantic Fleet. During World War II, the tugboat's operations were expanded into the Gulf of Mexico. She towed patrol crafts, amphibious vessels, and pontoon barges. Umpqua also assisted merchant ships and vessels in distress.

On 26 June 1941, Umpqua escorted the US Navy net tender Wapello to Cuba. The two ships arrived at Guantanamo Bay on 29 June.

On 19 March 1942, Umpqua rescued 30 survivors from the American merchant ship Liberator, after she had been torpedoed and sunk by the German submarine U-332 roughly 3 nautical miles (5.6 km; 3.5 mi) west of the Diamond Shoals Light Buoy. They were taken to Morehead City, North Carolina.

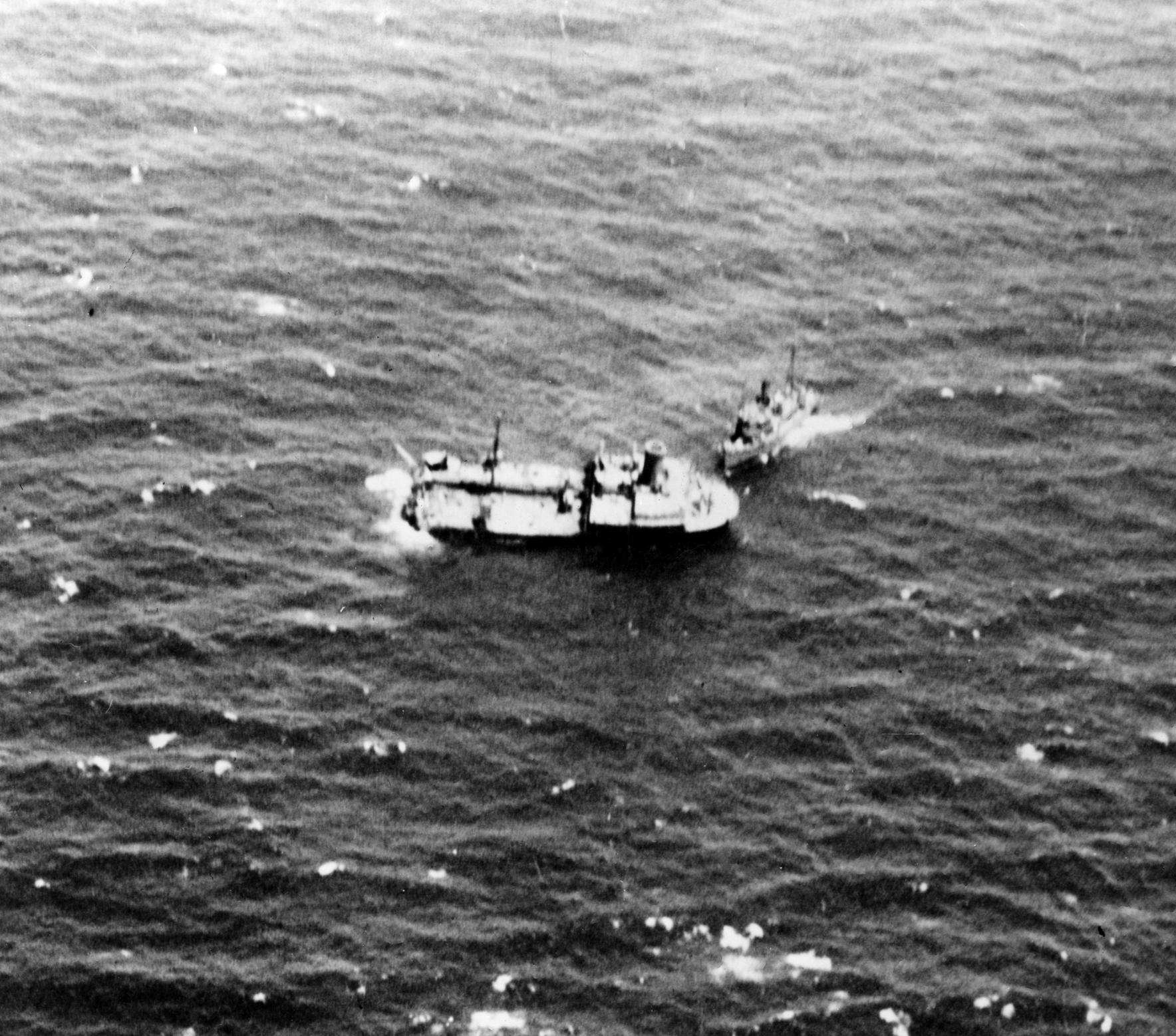
Umpqua inspecting the stern of SS Esso Nashville on 21 March 1942

On 21 March, the tugboat arrived at the scene to salvage the stern of the American tanker Esso Nashville, which had been torpedoed by the German submarine U-124 that morning. Umpqua towed the tanker until two tugboats from the Moran Towing Company arrived, which took over and towed her to Morehead City on 26 March.

On 23 March, she rescued a survivor clinging to the stern of the sinking American tanker Naeco. The tanker had been torpedoed by U-124 roughly 64 nautical miles (119 km; 74 mi) southeast of Cape Lookout, North Carolina. She also picked up four bodies, and carried them and the survivors to Morehead City.

Throughout 1943, Umpqua accompanied the United States Coast Guard ship USCGC Tallapoosa as a target vessel on her nightly trips to a position south of St. John's Lightship.

On 21 July 1944, Umpqua came to the aid of the submarine chaser PC-1505, which had broken down off the coast of Georgia. The tugboat relieved PC-1219 from the duty, and took PC-1505 in tow. Both vessels arrived at Charleston the next day.

For her service in World War II, Umpqua was awarded the American Defense Service Medal, the American Campaign Medal, and the World War II Victory Medal.

She was decommissioned at Charleston on 24 May 1946, and she was struck from the register of vessels on 3 July. Umpqua was transferred to the United States Maritime Commission for deposition on 4 December, which sold her that same day to the Salmons Dredging Company of Charleston for $2,500.

=== Classification ===
Umpqua was originally classified as Fleet Tug No. 25, but carried that classification for just under a year. On 17 July 1920, she was reclassified as an ocean-going tug (AT-25). The tugboat was reclassified as an old ocean-going tug (ATO-25) on 15 May 1944.

She was originally assigned the visual identifier GJLH, but this was changed to the IRCS call sign NATS in 1932.
