= Joshua Hendy =

Joshua Hendy may refer to:

- Joshua Hendy Iron Works, an American engineering company
- SS Esso Nashville, a ship later named Joshua Hendy
