= USS M. J. Scanlon =

Cargo ship of the United States Navy

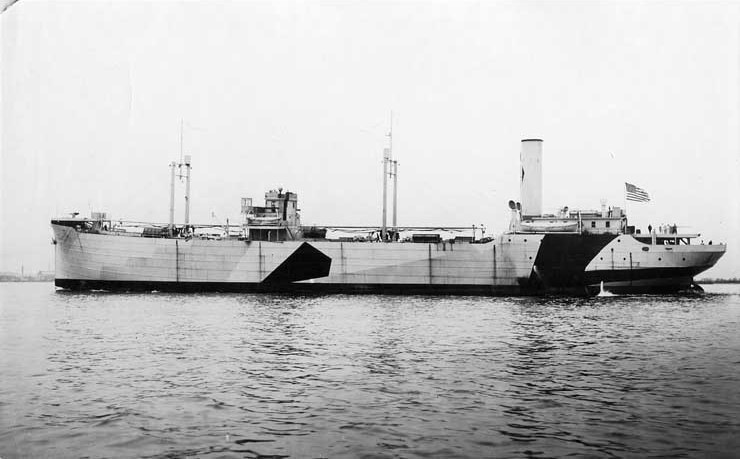
- USS M. J. Scanlon (ID-3513), probably photographed by her builder at the time of her completion in September 1918.

History

United States
- Name: USS M. J. Scanlon
- Namesake: Previous name retained
- Builder: New York Shipbuilding Company, Camden, New Jersey
- Launched: 4 July 1918
- Completed: September 1918
- Acquired: 23 September 1918
- Commissioned: 23 September 1918
- Decommissioned: 27 January 1919
- Fate: Transferred to United States Shipping Board 1919
- Notes: Operated as SS M. J. Scanlon from 1919 until 1925 or 1926, then as SS Missoula until 1935, as SS Malamton 1935-1941, and SS Minotaur from 1941; Sunk 9 January 1943

General characteristics
- Type: Cargo ship
- Tonnage: 5,672 Gross register tons
- Displacement: 11,620 tons
- Length: 361 ft 9 in (110.26 m)
- Beam: 51 ft (16 m)
- Draft: 28 ft (8.5 m)
- Propulsion: Three Scotch marine boilers, one triple-expansion steam engine, one shaft
- Speed: 10.5 knots

USS M. J. Scanlon (ID-3513) was a United States Navy cargo ship in commission from 1918 to 1919.

== Construction, acquisition, and commissioning ==
M. J. Scanlon was built in 1918 as the commercial cargo ship SS M. J. Scanlon by the New York Shipbuilding Company at Camden, New Jersey, for the United States Shipping Board. She was completed in September 1918 and on 23 September 1918 the U.S. Navy acquired her from the Shipping Board for use during World War I. Assigned the naval registry identification number 3513, she was commissioned the same day as USS M. J. Scanlon (ID-3513) at Philadelphia, Pennsylvania.

== Operational history ==
On 26 September 1918, M. J. Scanlon steamed to Norfolk, Virginia, where she loaded a cargo of United States Army supplies. In mid-October 1918, she departed Norfolk and steamed to New York City to join a convoy to Europe. Departing New York on 1 November 1918, she reached St. Nazaire, France, on 18 November 1918, a week after the 11 November 1918 Armistice with Germany that ended World War I. She discharged her cargo at St. Nazaire, then took on ballast and coal at Brest, France, early in December 1918.

On 3 December 1918, M. J. Scanlon departed Brest for the United States, arriving at New York City on 20 December 1918. She returned to Philadelphia on 7 January 1919.

== Decommissioning and later career ==
M. J. Scanlon was decommissioned at Philadelphia on 27 January 1919, and the Navy transferred her back to the U.S. Shipping Board. In subsequent commercial service, she operated as SS M. J. Scanlon until 1925 or 1926, when she was sold to the Hammond Lumber Company and renamed SS Missoula. She was renamed SS Malamton in 1935, and SS Minotaur in 1941.

On 9 January 1943, during World War II, Minotaur was torpedoed and sunk off Surinam by the German submarine U-124 with the loss of six lives.
