= SS Broad Arrow =

American oil tanker (1918–1942)

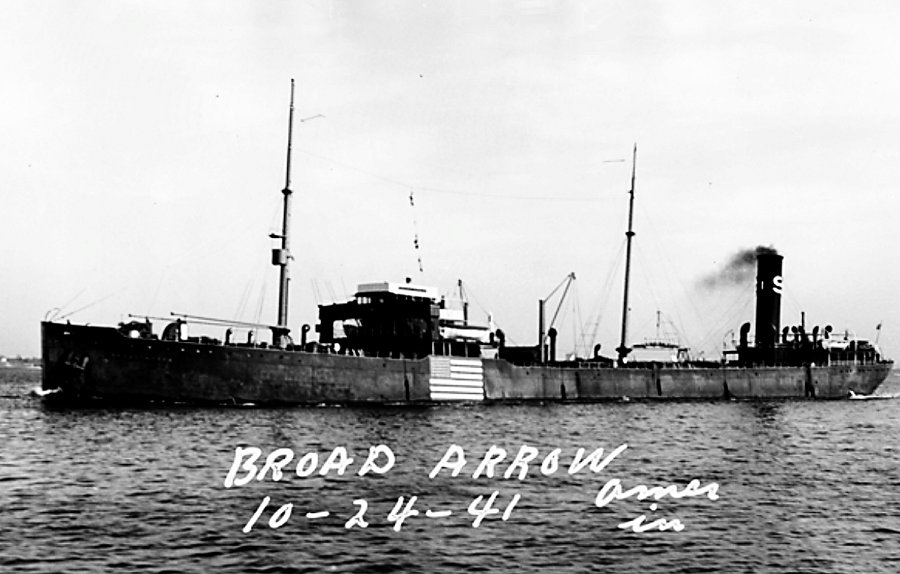
- Broad Arrow on October 24, 1941, with an American flag on her port side as a neutrality marking

History

United States
- Name: Broad Arrow
- Owner: United States Government (1918–1919); Socony (1919–1942)
- Operator: Naval Overseas Transportation Service (1918–1919); Socony (1919–1942)
- Builder: New York Shipbuilding Corporation
- Yard number: 175
- Laid down: April 26, 1917
- Launched: December 22, 1917
- Acquired: March 12, 1918
- Commissioned: May 6, 1918
- Decommissioned: February 24, 1919
- Reclassified: As a United States Ship (1917); As a steamship (1919)
- Identification: Official number: 2215988; Callsign: WSCJ (1917–1919); LJQT (1919–1942); Naval identification number: ID-2503
- Fate: Sunk on January 9, 1943

General characteristics
- Class & type: Arrow-class oil tanker
- Tonnage: 7,718 GRT; 4,714 NRT
- Length: 468 ft (143 m)
- Beam: 62.5 ft (19.1 m)
- Depth: 33 ft (10 m)

SS Broad Arrow was an Arrow-class oil tanker operated by the Naval Overseas Transportation Service from 1918 until 1919, and then the Standard Oil Company of New York (Socony) from 1919 until 1942. She was sunk by the German submarine U-124 on the night of January 8–9, 1943.

== Construction ==
=== Specifications ===
Broad Arrow's keel was laid as yard number 175 by the New York Shipbuilding Corporation in Camden, New Jersey, on April 26, 1917. She was launched on December 22 of that year and completed in early 1918. She was assigned the official number 2215988 and the callsign WSCJ.

Broad Arrow was 468 feet (143 m) long, 62.5 feet (19.1 m) wide, and had a depth of 33 feet (10 m). She had a gross register tonnage of 7,718 and a net register tonnage of 4,714. She had a cargo capacity of 99,742 barrels (15,857.7 m^{3}).

== Service history ==
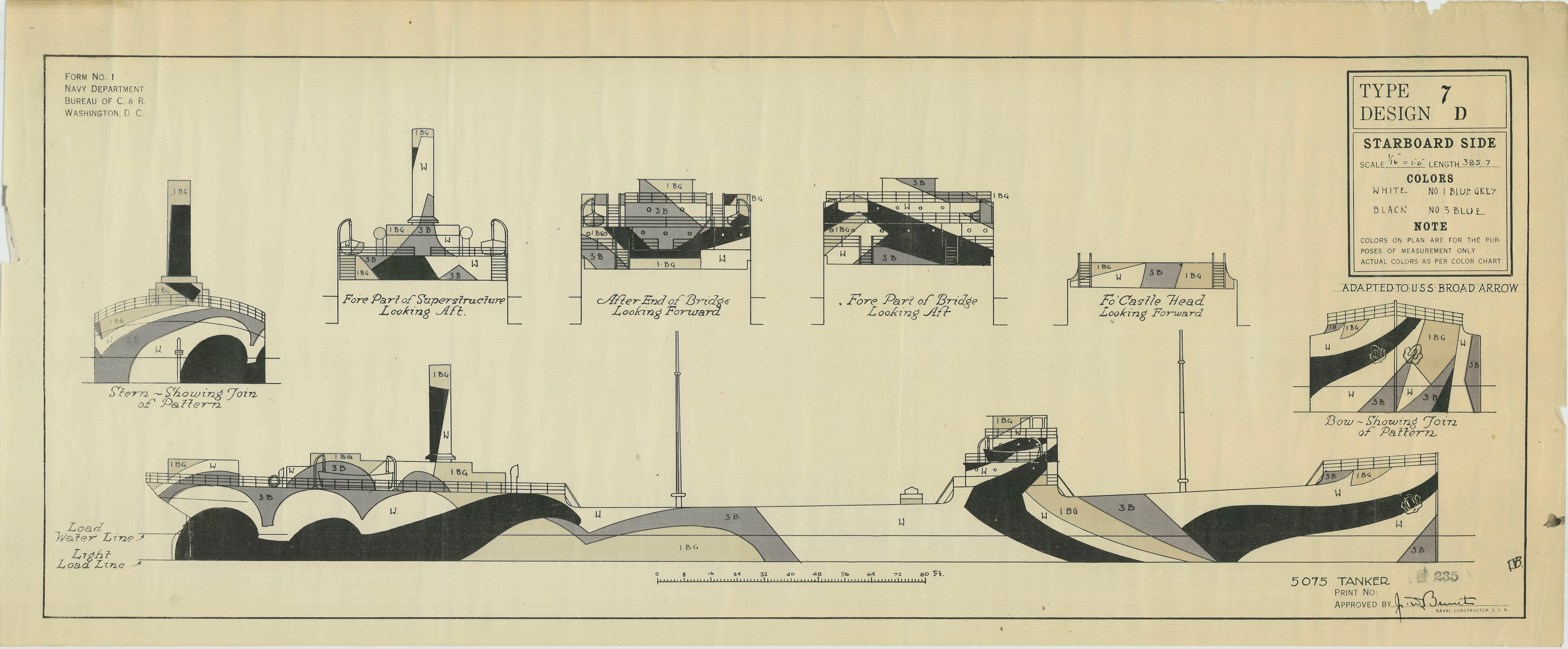
A drawing of USS Broad Arrow in Type 7 Design D camouflage, starboard side

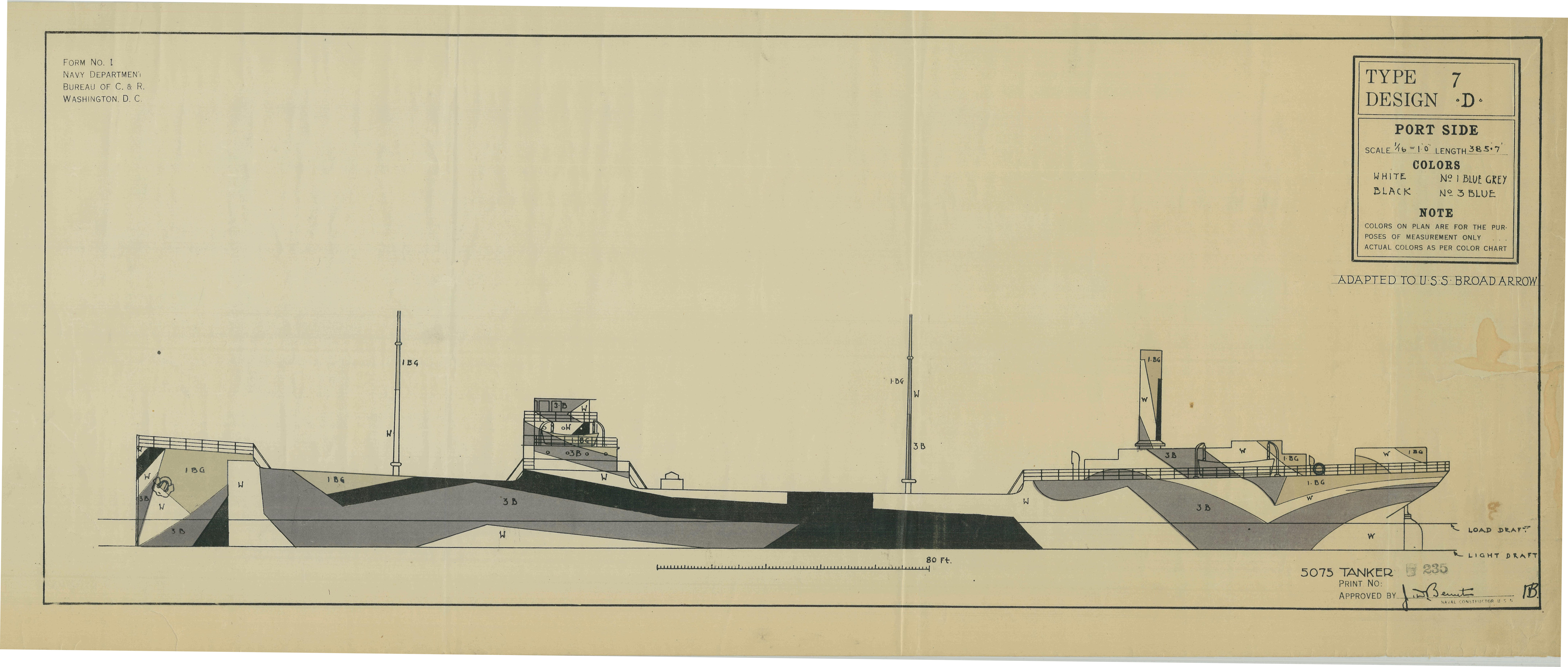
A drawing of USS Broad Arrow in Type 7 Design D camouflage, port side

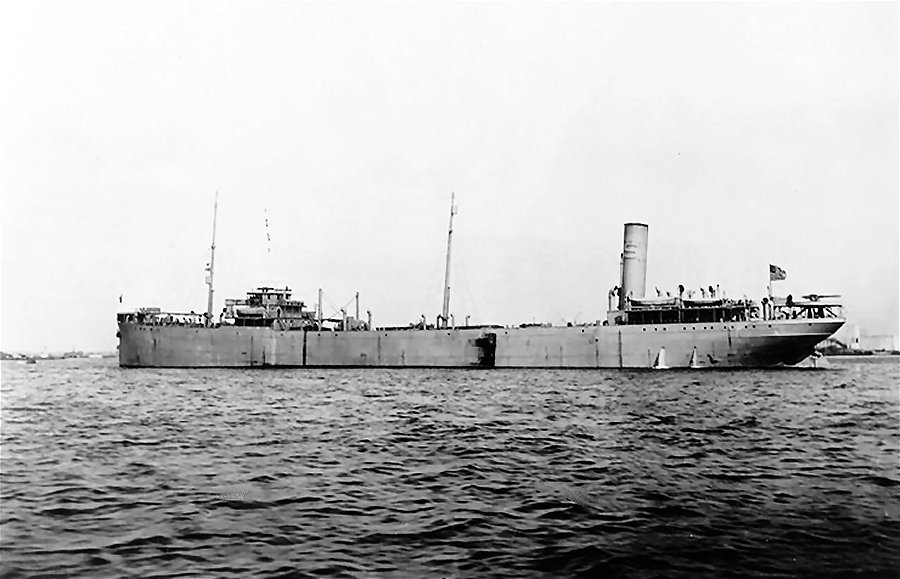
Broad Arrow photographed in 1918

Broad Arrow was acquired by the United States Shipping Board and given to the Naval Overseas Transportation Service on March 12, 1918. She was commissioned just days later, her prefix was changed to USS and she was given the naval identification number ID-2503. She began service on May 6. She was painted in "Type 7 Design D" dazzle camouflage, a series of blues, blacks, and grays painted in geometric patterns along the tanker's hull and superstructure. The tanker carried fuel and other between the United States and France for the next eleven months, her service stopping on November 11, 1918. Broad Arrow was decommissioned on February 24, 1919 in Brooklyn and returned to her owners shortly thereafter. Her callsign was also changed to LJQT.

Broad Arrow conducted voyages from the Pacific Coast to East Asia, usually departing from San Francisco. This route was common among the Arrow class oil tankers, as that was the route for which they were designed.

In September 1924, Broad Arrow was caught in two typhoons, passing through heavy winds, rough waves, and difficult conditions.

== Sinking ==
Broad Arrow departed Port of Spain, the capital of the British territory of Trinidad and Tobago, on January 5, 1943. She traveled in Convoy TB-1, which was bound for Rio de Janeiro, the second-largest city in Brazil. She carried 85,111 barrels (13,531.6 m^{3}) of diesel and fuel oil. She traveled in station 31 while in the convoy.

Close to midnight on January 8, the German submarine U-124 fired two torpedoes at Broad Arrow. The first torpedo struck the aft magazine on the port side and created a massive explosion, causing the ship to flood rapidly and settle by the stern. Seven of the ship's armed guards were killed by the explosion. The second torpedo struck the cargo hold and set it on fire, the tanker lighting up the entire convoy. Three other ships were struck by torpedoes moments after Broad Arrow—Birmingham City, Collingsworth, and Minotaur.

All crew in the engine room and on the bridge were killed by the explosions. The remainder of the crew abandoned ship roughly five minutes after the explosions, without orders, leaving others who were still aboard or in the water. There was one man aboard Lifeboat 3 and five aboard Lifeboat 4, the remainder of those that abandoned Broad Arrow did so aboard wooden rafts. The majority of those who escaped the ship had been sleeping in the forecastle when the torpedoes struck.

The crew in the lifeboats—three officers, 22 crewmen, and one armed guard—were picked up by USS PC-577, a patrol craft, the next day. They were taken to Paramaribo, capital of Surinam. Broad Arrow's second mate died aboard the patrol craft, and her pumpman died in the hospital due to burns sustained as he escaped the ship. Both were buried in Paramaribo.
