= USS Wapello =

Tugboat of the United States Navy

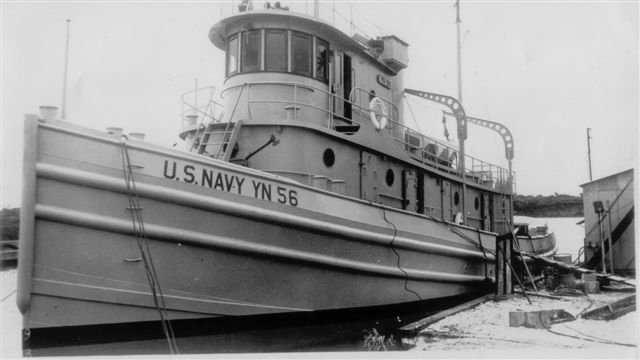
- USS Wapello (YN-56)

History

United States
- Name: USS Wapello
- Namesake: Wapello, a Meskwaki chief
- Builder: Gulfport Boiler and Welding Works, Port Arthur, Texas
- Completed: April 1941
- Commissioned: 9 June 1941
- Decommissioned: 23 October 1946
- Reclassified: Tug-class net tender, YNT-24, 7 April 1942
- Stricken: 21 November 1946
- Honors and awards: One battle star for World War II service
- Fate: Transferred to War Shipping Administration for disposal 3 May 1947
- Notes: Built for commercial service as tug R. K. Evans 1941; In commercial service from 1947 as Anna Coppedge, Colorado Point, Creole Firme, Island No. 1, and Gorgona II; Reflagged as Panamanian when renamed Island No. 1; Sank after being crushed by merchant ship in a lock of the Panama Canal

General characteristics
- Type: Net tender
- Length: 102 ft 2 in (31.14 m)
- Beam: 24 ft 0 in (7.32 m)
- Draft: 9 ft 6 in (2.90 m)

USS Wapello (YN-56), later YNT-24, was a United States Navy net tender in commission from 1941 to 1946.

Wapello was completed as the commercial tug R. K. Evans in April 1941 by the Gulfport Boiler and Welding Works at Port Arthur, Texas, for the General Motors Corporation of Cleveland, Ohio. Acquired by the U.S. Navy for service as a net tender, renamed USS Wapello, and designated YN-56, she was placed in service on 9 June 1941.

On 15 June 1941, Wapello arrived at the Naval Station Key West at Key West, Florida, for conversion and fitting-out. On 26 June 1941, she departed for Cuba in company with fleet tug USS Umpqua (AT-25) and arrived at Guantanamo Bay, Cuba, on 29 June 1941. Escorted by cargo ship USS Vega (AK-17) from Guantanamo Bay to San Diego, California, and by fleet oiler USS Ramapo (AO-12) from the United States West Coast to the Hawaiian Islands, Wapello arrived at Pearl Harbor, Hawaii, on 27 August 1941.

Attached to the 14th Naval District, Wapello tended harbor nets through the Japanese attack on Pearl Harbor on 7 December 1941. She remained at Pearl Harbor for the duration of hostilities, engaged in unglamorous but vital tasks. She was reclassified as a tug-class net tender, YNT-24, on 7 April 1942.

With the end of the war in the Pacific on 15 August 1945, the need for Wapello's services decreased rapidly, and she was declared surplus. Placed out of service at Bremerton, Washington, on 23 October 1946 and struck from the Navy List on 21 November 1946, Wapello was turned over to the War Shipping Administration for disposal on 3 May 1947.

She entered commercial service as Anna Coppedge. In succeeding years her name changed several times, to Colorado Point, Creole Firme, Island No. 1, and Gorgona II. At the time of the name change to Island No. 1, she was reflagged as a Panamanian vessel. Her commercial career ended when she was crushed by a merchant ship in a lock of the Panama Canal; she was towed to Miraflores Lake after the accident and sank there.
