= St. Johns River Light =

Lighthouse in Florida, United States

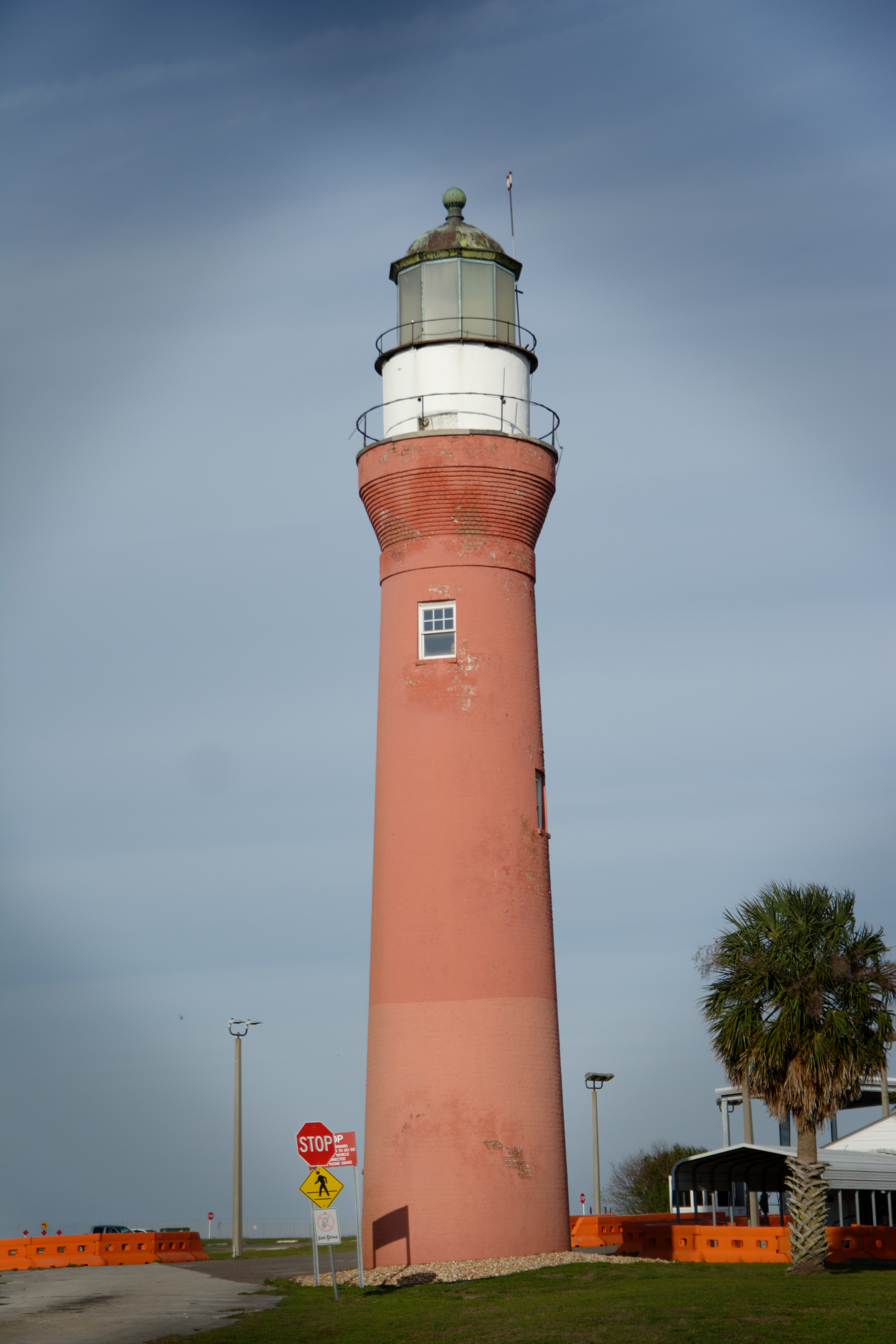
- Location: Near the mouth of the St. Johns River on the property of Naval Station Mayport
- Coordinates: 30°23′36.77″N 81°25′33.49″W

Tower
- Foundation: Natural / Emplaced
- Construction: Brick
- Height: 81 feet (25 m)
- Shape: Conical tower
- Heritage: National Register of Historic Places listed place

Light
- First lit: 1859
- Deactivated: 1929
- Lens: Third order Fresnel lens
- St. John's Lighthouse
- U.S. National Register of Historic Places
- Area: 0.1 acres (0.040 ha)
- Built: 1859
- NRHP reference No.: 76002237
- Added to NRHP: June 3, 1976

The St. Johns River Light is a decommissioned lighthouse in Jacksonville, Florida, U.S., which stands near the mouth of the St. Johns River. It is located on the grounds of Naval Station Mayport in the Mayport area. Constructed in 1858, it was decommissioned in 1929 and replaced with a lightship. It is sometimes known as the "Old St. Johns River Light" to distinguish it from the modern St. Johns Light, built in 1954.

The Old St. Johns River Light was the third lighthouse to be erected at the mouth of the St. Johns. It is the oldest one still standing, and is in fact the oldest surviving building in Mayport. It was added to the National Register of Historic Places in 1976 and underwent restoration in 1980.

== History ==
The St. Johns River Light was erected in 1858 at Mayport, on what is now the property of Naval Station Mayport. It was the third lighthouse to stand at the mouth of the St. Johns River, and was designed specifically to overcome the previous structures' problems with visibility and erosion. The first St. Johns lighthouse was erected in 1830, after the U.S. purchase of Florida, and was funded by the U.S. Congress. However, it was built too close to the water and had to be demolished only three years later. The second lighthouse was erected in 1835, about a mile upriver. However, the view of the light from the sea was often blocked by shifting sand dunes, and by 1853 its foundation was so disturbed by erosion that plans were made to replace it. This structure was soon abandoned and enveloped by the river, though its ruins could still be seen in the early 20th century.

The present St. Johns River Light was erected in 1858. In order to avoid its predecessors' problems, it was made substantially taller and further from the waterline. During the American Civil War the lighthouse was extinguished by Confederate authorities, probably on July 10, 1861. The lighthouse keeper, John Daniels, remained at the lighthouse after it was extinguished. While Federal forces occupied the area, Daniels was arrested for showing light signals from the top of the tower at night. A Union soldier's Civil War diary entry recorded the arrest: "It was almost thee o'clock in the morning as near as I can remember, when we started from camp ... We were going to surround the lighthouse keeper's dwelling and arrest the keeper and any other parties we might find there ... The keeper denied all knowledge of any light and declared he was a Union man. Nevertheless, they took him under guard down to camp. ... I pitied the light keeper's wife, who was almost frantic with fear for her husband. ... It turned out that when the moon was first rising ... it was only a reflection, lasting a few moments." Other reports of Confederates shooting out the light to hamper Union ships attempting to locate the river have not been verified. The tower was finally relit on July 4, 1867. In 1887 authorities planned to heighten the tower another twelve feet. A study in the 20th century determined that this plan was never carried out, though the light station canopy was remodeled, and the present copper cupola was installed.

In 1929, the St. Johns River Light was decommissioned after over 70 years of service. It was replaced by the St. Johns Lightship (LV-84), moored about 8 miles offshore from the river's mouth. In the 1940s the U.S. Navy acquired most of Mayport, including the area around the lighthouse, in order to establish Naval Station Mayport. The Navy demolished an attached one-story building and raised the grade of the surrounding land by about seven feet. As such the original door is buried and the tower is only accessible via a window eight feet off the ground. In 1954 the modern St. Johns Light was built to replace the lightship; it is located about two miles southeast of the Old St. Johns River Light.

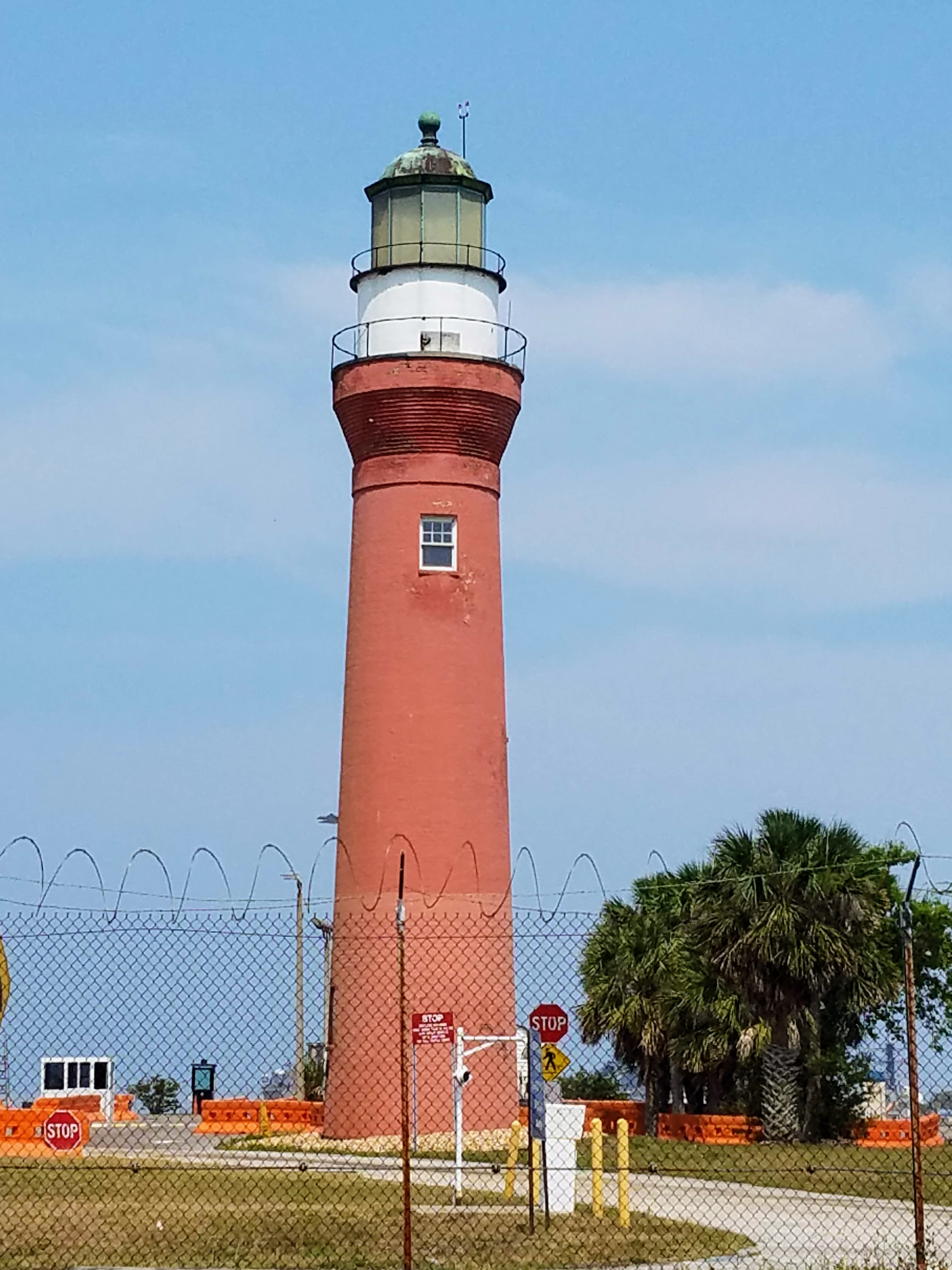
St. John's Lighthouse May 2019

The Old St. Johns River Light was added to the National Register of Historic Places in 1976. It is the oldest surviving building in Mayport, and was designated one most significant historic buildings in Jacksonville by the Jacksonville Historic Landmarks Commission. In 1980 it underwent restoration by Shepard Associates. It currently stands at 85 feet tall, with a red brick tower, slate stairs and balcony, and a white watch room topped by a copper cupola. A local group, the Mayport Lighthouse Association, hope to undertake a full restoration and open the structure to the public.
