= SS Naeco =

American oil tanker (1918–1942)

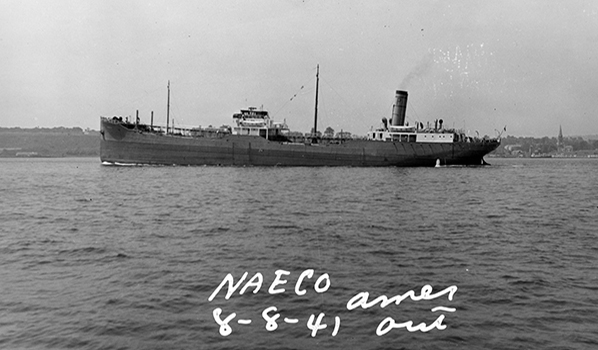
- Naeco photographed by the United States Coast Guard on August 8, 1941

History
- Name: Charles M. Everest (1918–1933); Naeco (1933–1942)
- Owner: United States Shipping Board (1918–1919); Socony-Vacuum Oil Company (1919–1933); Pennsylvania Shipping Company (1933–1942)
- Operator: United States Shipping Board (1918–1919); Socony-Vacuum Oil Company (1919–1931); Standard Transportation Company (1931–1933); Pennsylvania Shipping Company (1933–1942)
- Port of registry: (United States) Wilmington, Delaware
- Builder: Bethlehem Shipbuilding Corporation
- Yard number: 449
- Laid down: August 31, 1918
- Launched: December 12, 1918
- Completed: 1919
- Identification: Call sign: LMNB; IMO number: 217130
- Fate: Sunk on March 23, 1942

General characteristics
- Type: Oil tanker
- Tonnage: 5,373 GRT
- Length: 428 ft (130 m)
- Beam: 53 ft (16 m)
- Depth: 26 ft (7.9 m)
- Installed power: 1 × 3-cylinder triple expansion steam engine
- Propulsion: 1 propeller

SS Naeco was an American oil tanker built in 1918 as Charles M. Everest, in Wilmington, Delaware. It was renamed Naeco in 1933, after being purchased by the Pennsylvania Shipping Company. The tanker was torpedoed by U-124 and sunk off North Carolina on March 23, 1942 during World War II.

== Construction ==
Naeco was built as Charles M. Everest during World War I in Wilmington, Delaware, by the Bethlehem Shipbuilding Corporation. Her keel was laid on August 31, 1918, and she was launched on December 12. She was completed sometime in 1919. During construction, she was yard number 449. She was subsequently assigned the IMO number 217130 and the call sign LMNB.

=== Specifications ===
The tanker had a length of 428 feet 2 inches (130.5 m), a beam of 53.0 feet (16.15 m), and a depth of 26.0 feet (7.92 m). She was assessed at 5,373 gross register tons (GRT). She operated off of a three-cylinder, single-shaft triple expansion steam engine. Naeco had two single boilers, each with four corrugated furnaces. She operated off a single propeller.

== Service history ==
Charles M. Everest was owned by the United States Shipping Board until 1919, when she was purchased by the Socony-Vacuum Oil Company. She was operated by the Standard Transportation Company, a subsidiary of Socony, from 1931 until 1933. That year, she was sold to the Pennsylvania Shipping Company of Philadelphia and renamed Naeco. The tanker operated out of Wilmington throughout the beginning of World War II.

== Sinking ==
Naeco departed Houston, Texas, bound for Sewarren, New Jersey, sometime in March 1942. She was carrying 72,000 barrels (11,400 m^{3}) of kerosene and 25,000 bbl (4,000 m^{3}) of heating oil. The tanker began to approach Cape Hatteras on March 23, where the U-124 was operating.

A torpedo was fired by U-124 at Naeco, which either missed the ship or was a dud. The submarine fired its last torpedo 65 miles (105 km) southeast of Cape Lookout. This one struck the starboard side amidships at 10:23 AM, just aft of the mast. The flames ignited the ship's cargo and caused a massive fireball to erupt, which engulfed the midships superstructure and sent burning oil spewing into the water.

The engineers aboard Naeco managed to secure her engines and stop the ship. Then, the surviving crew of the vessel began to abandon ship. In the attack by U-124, however, two lifeboats had been smashed and another had been swamped when it was launched while the tanker was still underway. Ten crewmen made it into the last lifeboat and were picked up by the United States Coast Guard vessel USCGC Dione, which had noticed the explosion and had come to investigate. Dione also plucked two men from the water. The United States Navy fleet tug USS Umpqua and minesweeper USS Osprey also came to the scene, Umpqua picking up a survivor on the tanker's stern and Osprey finding one man on a wrecked life raft.

The 14 survivors were taken to Morehead City, North Carolina. Also taken were four bodies, which had been picked up by Umpqua. Naeco eventually broke in two, the bow sinking first. The stern drifted towards Cape Lookout, before it finally sank around 3:30 PM.

== Wrecksite ==
The wreck of Naeco is between 140–145 feet (43–44 m) deep in water off Cape Lookout. It lies in two parts, the bow and stern, which are nearly 1 mile (1.6 km) apart from one another, Much of the tanker's stern is intact, and most of it is still visible.
