= USS Liberator (1918) =

US navy ship

History

United States
- Name: USS Liberator
- Builder: Smith & Dimon, New York City
- Laid down: 1918
- Launched: 24 March 1918
- Decommissioned: 4 October 1919
- In service: 1933
- Out of service: 19 March 1942
- Fate: Sold in 1933, Struck by torpedo on 19 March 1942 and sank

General characteristics
- Tonnage: 6,027
- Length: 440 ft (130 m)
- Beam: 56 ft (17 m)
- Draft: 30 ft 6 in (9.30 m)
- Propulsion: Two single ended Scotch boilers, one 2,800ihp vertical triple expansion reciprocating steam engine, oil burner, one shaft.
- Speed: 10.5 kts
- Complement: 70

USS Liberator was a United States Navy ship. She was decommissioned on October 4, 1919, sold in 1933, and struck by torpedo on March 19, 1942, and sank.

== History ==
Liberator was a United States Navy ship originally built as the Wichita in 1918 by Union Iron Works in San Francisco, California. She was launched on March 24, 1918, and acquired by the Navy on July 2, 1918, being commissioned the same day. Her service during World War I was brief, as she was decommissioned on October 4, 1919, at Bayonne, New Jersey, and subsequently returned to the United States Shipping Board.

In 1933, the ship was sold to the Lykes Brothers Steamship Company of New Orleans, Louisiana, becoming SS Liberator. On March 19, 1942, while en route from Galveston, Texas to New York carrying 11,000 tons of sulfur she was struck by a torpedo from the German submarine U-332. The attack occurred approximately 3 miles west of Diamond Shoals. The torpedo hit the port side at the aft end of the engine room, demolishing it and resulting in the deaths of five crew members. The ship sank within 21 minutes of the attack.

The 31 survivors of the Liberator were rescued by the USS Umpqua and taken to Morehead City, North Carolina. Notably, on the evening prior to the sinking, the gun crew of the Liberator mistakenly fired at and hit the USS Dickerson, which was conducting an anti-submarine patrol. The friendly fire incident resulted in four fatalities aboard the Dickerson including her commanding officer who died shortly before the destroyer docked at the Norfolk Navy Yard in Portsmouth, Virginia.

The crew of the Liberator reported having engaged and sunk a German U-boat in battle before their own ship was torpedoed and sunk.
