= SS Umona =

Coordinates: 07°25′N 13°55′W

History

United Kingdom
- Name: Umona
- Owner: Bullard, King & Co (Natal Direct Line)
- Port of registry: (United Kingdom) London
- Route: Middlesbrough – London – Cape Town – Durban – Indian Ocean
- Builder: Sir John Laing & Sons, Sunderland
- Yard number: 630
- Launched: 7 September 1910
- Completed: October 1910
- Identification: UK official number 129142; code letters HRSQ; Call sign GSDF
- Fate: Sunk by torpedo, 30 March 1941

General characteristics
- Type: Cargo liner
- Tonnage: 3,753 GRT; tonnage under deck 3,240; 2,388 NRT
- Length: 356.0 ft (108.5 m)
- Beam: 44.5 ft (13.6 m)
- Draught: 23 ft 9 in (7.24 m)
- Depth: 26.0 ft (7.9 m)
- Installed power: 497 NHP
- Propulsion: 3-cylinder triple-expansion engine; single screw
- Speed: 13 knots (24 km/h)
- Crew: 86 crew and three DEMS gunners
- Armament: DEMS

SS Umona was a British cargo liner. She was built at Sunderland on the River Wear in 1910, survived the First World War and was sunk by a German submarine off Sierra Leone, West Africa in 1941.

Umona spent her entire 31-year career with Bullard, King and Company. She was the second of the company's ships of that name. The first was a 2,031 GRT cargo liner that had been built at Sunderland in 1890 and wrecked off the Maldives in the Indian Ocean in 1903.

Bullard, King gave all its ships African names to highlight its Natal Direct line, which had linked Middlesbrough and London with Durban in Natal Province since 1879 and later with ports in Portuguese Mozambique and elsewhere in the Indian Ocean.

== Building ==
Sir James Laing and Son built Umona in 1910, completing her that October. She had nine corrugated furnaces with a combined grate area of 173 square feet (16 m^{2}) that heated three single-ended boilers with a combined heating surface of 7,180 square feet (667 m^{2}). These fed steam at 180 lb_{f}/in^{2} to a three-cylinder triple expansion steam engine built by George Clark Ltd of Sunderland.

The engine was rated at 497 NHP and drove a single screw, giving the ship a speed of only 13 knots (24 km/h). Despite carrying passengers on a regular route, Umona was no faster than many cargo ships of her period. She was built for economy, not speed.

== Second World War service ==
When the Second World War broke out, convoys protected only part of Umona's long route between Britain and the Indian Ocean. There were many outbound convoys that gave merchant ships only a few days' escort out of home waters. Three weeks after the UK entered the war, Umona joined Convoy OA 8 off Southend-on-Sea, which left on 21 September. The convoy was escorted by the Royal Navy destroyers HMS Jackal and Janus and Polish destroyer ORP Grom. It dispersed at sea on 24 September, and Umona continued to Mauritius unescorted.

Inbound ships could call at Freetown, Sierra Leone to join a convoy to Britain. Umona, returning with general cargo, was one of 16 merchant ships that formed Convoy SL 14 at Christmas 1939. The Convoy Commodore, Rear Admiral Sir Cecil Reyne KBE, travelled on Umona. SL 14 left Freetown on Boxing Day escorted only by two sloops, HMS Bideford and Leith, but safely reached Liverpool on 15 January.

In February 1940 Umona joined Convoy FS 100, which left the Tyne Estuary on 19 February and arrived off Southend two days later. The next month she joined Convoy OA 105G off Southend, which left on 7 March, formed Convoy OG 21 at sea on the 11th and reached Gibraltar on the 17th. Umona continued to Cape Town, South Africa unescorted.

Umona returned with general cargo and in May 1940 joined Convoy SL 33 at Freetown. Initially SL 33's only escort was an armed merchant cruiser (AMC), the converted Australian passenger liner HMS Bulolo. Again Umona carried the Convoy Commodore, this time Rear-Admiral John Casement, CB. On 6 June SL 33 was joined at sea by two additional escorts: the corvette HMS Arabis and sloop Leith. SL33 reached Liverpool on 9 June.

On 22 June 1940 France surrendered to Germany, Germany occupied France's entire Atlantic and English Channel coasts and the French Navy was neutralised. The English Channel became more dangerous to Allied shipping, and convoy movements were modified. In July Umona, carrying general cargo, joined Convoy FN 214, which formed off Southend, left on 5 July and went north, arriving in the Firth of Forth off Methil, Fife two days later. There Umona and many other ships from FN 214 joined Convoy OA 179, which left on 8 July and dispersed at sea on 13 July. Once again Umona continued to Cape Town unescorted.

In autumn 1940 Umona returned with a cargo of sugar, calling at Freetown where she joined Convoy SL 50. This time she did not carry the Convoy Commodore but her Master was made Vice-Commodore. SL 50 left Freetown on 3 October escorted by two AMCs: the converted passenger liners HMS Pretoria Castle and Alcantara. On 21 October the convoy was joined at sea by the destroyer HMS Clare and Flower-class corvettes Anemone and Clematis. In home waters the convoy was joined by the light cruiser HMS Curacoa on 25 October and reached Liverpool the next day.

On 14 November 1940 Umona sailed in ballast from the Firth of Clyde with Convoy WN 38, which sailed north around Cape Wrath and on 17 November arrived off Methil. There several ships from WN 38 joined Convoy FS 338, which left on 18 November and arrived off Southend on 20 November.

At the beginning of 1941 Umona loaded general cargo and joined Convoy EN 57, which left Methil on 15 January, rounded Cape Wrath and arrived off Oban two days later. Umona continued south, joining Convoy OB 276 which left Liverpool on 20 January and dispersed at sea on the 25th.

== Final voyage and loss ==
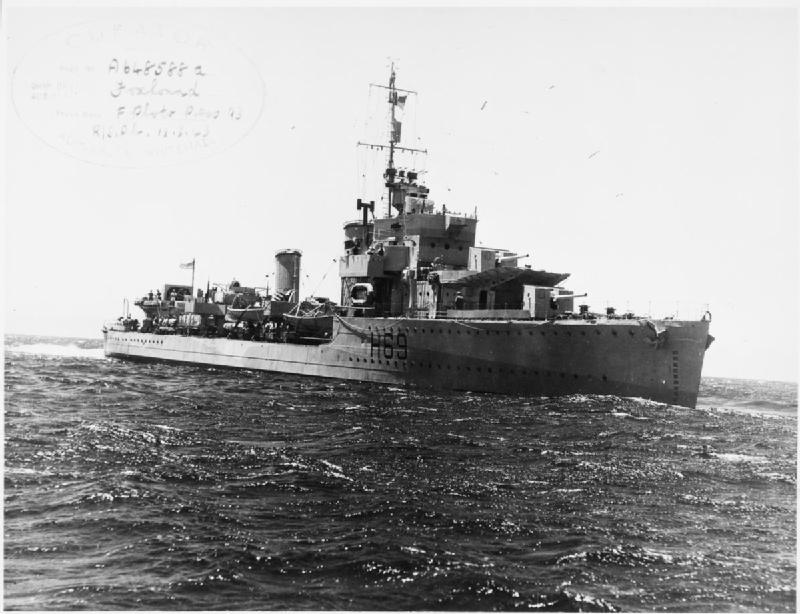
The destroyer HMS Foxhound, which rescued three of Umona's Lascars

Approximate position of Umona's wreck

In March 1941 Umona sailed from Durban for London, laden with 1,549 tons of maize, 50 tons of pulses and 47 tons of jam. She called at Walvis Bay in South West Africa on 20 March and headed unescorted for Freetown to join an inbound convoy. Umona's complement was typical of many British merchant ships: her officers and stewards were British, her crew were Muslim Lascars and her carpenter was Chinese. By the time she left Walvis Bay she was carrying 14 passengers including seven distressed British seamen (DBS), i.e. British mariners who had survived the sinking of their ships and were going home.

Late on the evening of 30 March Umona was about 90 nautical miles (170 km) southwest of Freetown when the German submarine U-124 attacked her, hitting her with one torpedo at 2301 hours and another two minutes later. She quickly sank, killing her Master Frederick Peckham, 81 crew, seven DEMS gunners and 13 passengers. The radio officer on duty (Umona had three radio officers sharing duties in a watch system) stayed at his post as long as possible, transmitting a distress message, then leapt into the sea.

Umona had managed to launch only one of her six lifeboats before she sank. It was commanded by her fourth officer, 20-year-old Edwin Clarke, but U-124 surfaced, captured Clarke and submerged. After sinking Allied ships Kriegsmarine vessels often sought to obtain intelligence from survivors, and particularly from officers.

Three other survivors managed to board a small liferaft. One was the duty radio officer who had sent the distress message. The others were a badly wounded DEMS gunner, EG Elliot RN, and a passenger called Frank Brothers. After they had drifted for four days they sighted a submarine and used the reflective surface of a tobacco tin as a heliograph to attract her attention. The submarine, which may have been U-124, came and gave them fresh water. The next day the weather worsened, and in the afternoon the radio officer died.

On 7 April, while escorting Convoy WS 7, the destroyer HMS Foxhound, rescued three Lascar crewmen, apparently from the lifeboat from which Clarke had been captured. Foxhound did not see the raft, which continued to drift. On 12 April the British cargo ship Lorca sighted the raft and rescued Brothers and Elliot. Foxhound and Lorca each landed their survivors at Freetown.

In all, 99 men and two women from Umona died, Edwin Clarke was unaccounted for after being captured and was presumed dead, and only five survivors were rescued.

== Awards and monuments ==
Gunner Elliot and Frank Reginald Brothers were both awarded the British Empire Medal and Lloyd's War Medal for Bravery at Sea.

Members of Umona's crew who were killed are commemorated in the Second World War section of the Merchant Navy War Memorial at Tower Hill in London. Her Lascar seamen are commemorated in the Commonwealth War Graves Commission monuments at Chittagong and Mumbai. Her civilian war dead are commemorated on CWGC's Civilian Roll of Honour which is on display at Westminster Abbey. All CWGC's casualties are listed on their database which can be accessed at www.cwgc.org

== Sources ==
- Slader, John (1988). The Red Duster at War. London: William Kimber & Co Ltd. p. 124. ISBN 0-7183-0679-1.
