= USS Pilgrim (SP-1204) =

Patrol vessel of the United States Navy

Coordinates: 34.71226°N 76.58878°W

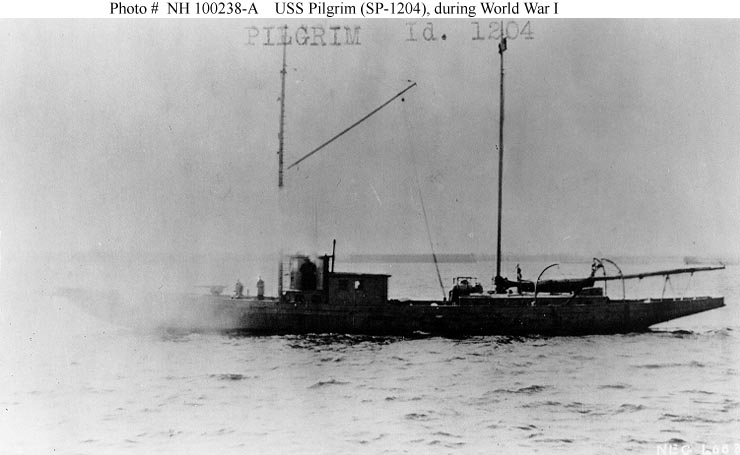
- A damaged photograph of USS Pilgrim (SP-1204) sometime in 1917 or 1918.

History

United States
- Name: USS Pilgrim
- Namesake: Previous name retained
- Builder: Pusey and Jones, Wilmington, Delaware
- Completed: 1893
- Acquired: 30 June 1917 or in July 1917
- Commissioned: 18 July 1917
- Decommissioned: 7 January 1919
- Fate: Returned to owner 7 January 1919
- Notes: Operated as private sailing yacht Pilgrim 1893-1894, as private steam yacht and commercial fishing vessel Pilgrim 1894-1913, and as commercial motor fishing vessel Pilgrim 1913-1917 and 1919-1935

General characteristics
- Type: Patrol vessel
- Tonnage: 98 Gross register tons
- Length: 120 ft (37 m)
- Beam: 23 ft (7.0 m)
- Draft: 8 ft 6 in (2.59 m)
- Propulsion: Gasoline engine
- Speed: 6.9 knots
- Complement: 27
- Armament: 2 × 1-pounder guns (one forward, one aft)

The third USS Pilgrim (SP-1204) was a United States Navy patrol vessel in commission from 1917 to 1919.

== Construction and early career ==
Pilgrim was built as a private, steel-hulled sailing yacht of the same name in 1893 by Pusey and Jones at Wilmington, Delaware, for a racing syndicate in Boston, Massachusetts, which intended to use her in competition for America's Cup; she had 10,261 square feet (953.3 m^{2}) of sail. During a series of races off Sandy Hook, New Jersey, against three other yachts in September 1893, she proved to be fast but too poor at minding her helm to race competitively, and another yacht was selected to represent the United States in defense of America's Cup. In 1894, the syndicate sold her to Lamont G. Burnham, Esq., of Boston, who had her converted to steam propulsion; she served as his private yacht.

By 1907, Pilgrim was the property of the Boston Floating Hospital. In 1908 and 1909, she served as the private yacht of Wendell H. Wyman of Boston; in 1910, after being purchased by John A. Royall of Boston to be refitted with new engines, she operated as a fishing vessel and yacht, with her home port at Boston. In 1913, she was sold by Royall to Hugh C. Jones of Beaufort, North Carolina; where she operated as a yacht initially then fishing vessel. The Beaufort Fish Scrap and Oil Company of New Bern, North Carolina, purchased her in 1916.

== United States Navy service ==
On 30 June 1917 or in July 1917, the U.S. Navy acquired her under a free lease from Beaufort Fish Scrap and Oil for use as a section patrol boat during World War I. She was commissioned on 18 July 1917 as USS Pilgrim (SP-1204).

Assigned to the 5th Naval District, Pilgrim patrolled the North Carolina coast for the rest of World War I, operating in Pamlico Sound and Onslow Bay as far south as the New River.

Pilgrim was decommissioned on 7 January 1919, and returned to Beaufort Fish Oil and Scrap the same day.

== Later career ==
Beaufort Fish Scrap and Oil operated Pilgrim until 1927, when she was sold to the Newport Fisheries Company of Beaufort. F. S. Dickinson of Rutherford, New Jersey, purchased her in 1934, but her home port remained Beaufort. At times during the 1920s and 1930s, Pilgrim operated out of Mayport, Florida, while fishing.

Abandoned in 1935, Pilgrim was towed to Harkers Point at Harkers Island, North Carolina, for use as a breakwater. Her hull was filled with concrete to keep her from moving.

The remains of Pilgrim's hull remain visible at Harkers Point.
