= SS Esso Nashville =

American oil tanker (1940–1963)

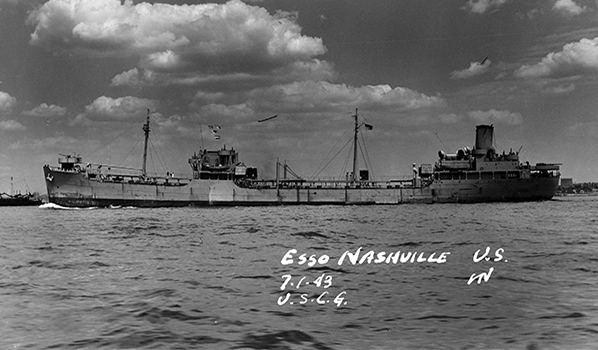
- Esso Nashville photographed on July 1, 1943

History
- Name: Esso Nashville (1940–1952); Joshua Hendy (1952–1959); Helen (1959–1963)
- Owner: Standard Oil Company of New Jersey (1940–1943); War Shipping Administration (1943–1945); Standard Oil Company of New Jersey (1945–1959); M. E. & N. E. Kulukundis (1959–1963)
- Operator: Standard Oil Company of New Jersey (1940–1943); War Shipping Administration (1943–1945); Standard Oil Company of New Jersey (1945–1950); Esso Shipping Company (1950–1959); Olympic Transport (1959–1963)
- Ordered: August 1, 1938
- Builder: Bethlehem Steel's Shipbuilding Division
- Yard number: 4349
- Launched: June 15, 1940
- Sponsored by: Mrs. Hermon Sweeney Atchison
- Completed: August 1940
- In service: 1940–March 1942; March 1943–1960
- Identification: Call sign: WSOG; IMO number: 239817
- Fate: Scrapped at Onomichi, 1963

General characteristics
- Type: Oil tanker
- Tonnage: 7,934 GRT; 13,000 NRT
- Length: 463 ft (141 m)
- Beam: 64 ft (20 m)
- Draft: 28.33 ft (8.63 m)
- Speed: 13 knots (24 km/h; 15 mph)
- Capacity: 106,400 bbl (16,920 m^{3})

SS Esso Nashville was an American oil tanker built in 1940 in Wilmington, Delaware, for the Standard Oil Company of New Jersey. During World War II, she was torpedoed on March 21, 1942 by a German submarine, losing her entire forward section, but escaped. The vessel was repaired and re-entered service in March 1943. Esso Nashville was transferred to the Esso Shipping Company and then sold to the Joshua Hendy Corporation in 1952 and renamed Joshua Hendy. She was sold in 1959 to Olympic Transport and renamed Helen. Laid up in 1960, the ship was scrapped at Onomichi, Japan, in 1963.

== Construction ==
Esso Nashville was ordered on August 1, 1938. Her keel was laid down as yard number 4349 from the Sparrows Point Yard of Bethlehem Steel's Shipbuilding Division. She was launched on June 15, 1940, christened by Mrs. Hermon Sweeney Atchison—wife of the manager of the Baltimore branch of the Standard Oil Company of New Jersey's marine division. She was completed in August and assigned the official number 239914, the IMO number 239817, and the call sign WSOG.

=== Specifications ===
Esso Nashville had a length of 463 feet (141 m), a beam of 64 feet (20 m), and a depth of 28.33 feet (8.63 m). She was powered by two steam turbines with steam supplied from two oil-fired water-tube boilers, capable of 985 horsepower (735 kW). The tanker had a maximum speed of 13 knots (24 km/h; 15 mph). She had a capacity of 106,400 barrels (16,920 m^{3}), and was divided into 24 compartments with the adequate pumping capacity to load or unload in 12 hours. She was assessed at 7,934 gross register tons (GRT) and 13,000 tons deadweight (DWT).

== Service history ==
=== World War II ===
Esso Nashville generally traveled from Baytown and other Texan ports to New York City, from December 1941 until March 1942 into World War II.

==== Torpedoing ====
Esso Nashville left Port Arthur on March 16, carrying 106,718 bbl (16,966.8 m^{3}) of fuel oil. She was bound for New Haven, Connecticut. She was traveling alone and unarmed. She was manned by eight officers and 30 men, captained by Edward V. Peters.

On March 21, at 6:08 AM, a single torpedo was fired at the tanker by the German submarine U-124. Esso Nashville was about 16 miles (26 km) northeast of the Frying Pan Lightship Buoy while traveling at a speed of 13 knots. The torpedo was fired at a distance of about 900 yards (820 m). It struck the starboard side, forward of the crew quarters and about 5 feet (1.5 m) from the stem, but did not detonate. A second torpedo struck amidships just a minute later, 10 feet (3.0 m) below the waterline, and caused an explosion.

The blast lifted the tanker out of the water, "throwing her to starboard and then keeling her to port so violently" to the point where one crewman thought the tanker might capsize, and Esso Nashville's radio operator was thrown out of his bed. The tanker's back was broken, and hot oil rained down onto the deck, reaching "as high as the foremast." The evacuation was calm and orderly, as the crew had trained constantly and her four lifeboats had already been swung out.

Third Assistant Engineer Henry Garig, sitting in a lifeboat about 0.5 miles (0.80 km) away from the tanker at dawn, noticed that her flag on the stern had been hoisted in an upside-down position, indicating that someone was still aboard. It was Captain Peters, who had remained aboard since he was unable to make it into a lifeboat in time, as he had tried to retrieve secret papers from his cabin. He attempted to swim away from the tanker but then returned. His leg was broken, and he made his way to the stern where he had hoisted the flag upside-down to signal to the ship's rescuers that he was still aboard.

Eventually, Esso Nashville was spotted by the United States Coast Guard vessel USCGC Agassiz, which rescued Captain Peters after Garig informed her crew he was in the water. Him and the eight crewmen, along with Garig, were rescued and taken to Southport, North Carolina. Twenty-one survivors were picked up by USCGC Tallapoosa and taken to Savannah, and the remaining eight members of Esso Nashville's crew were picked up the next day by USS McKean and taken to Norfolk, Virginia.

==== Salvage and reconstruction ====
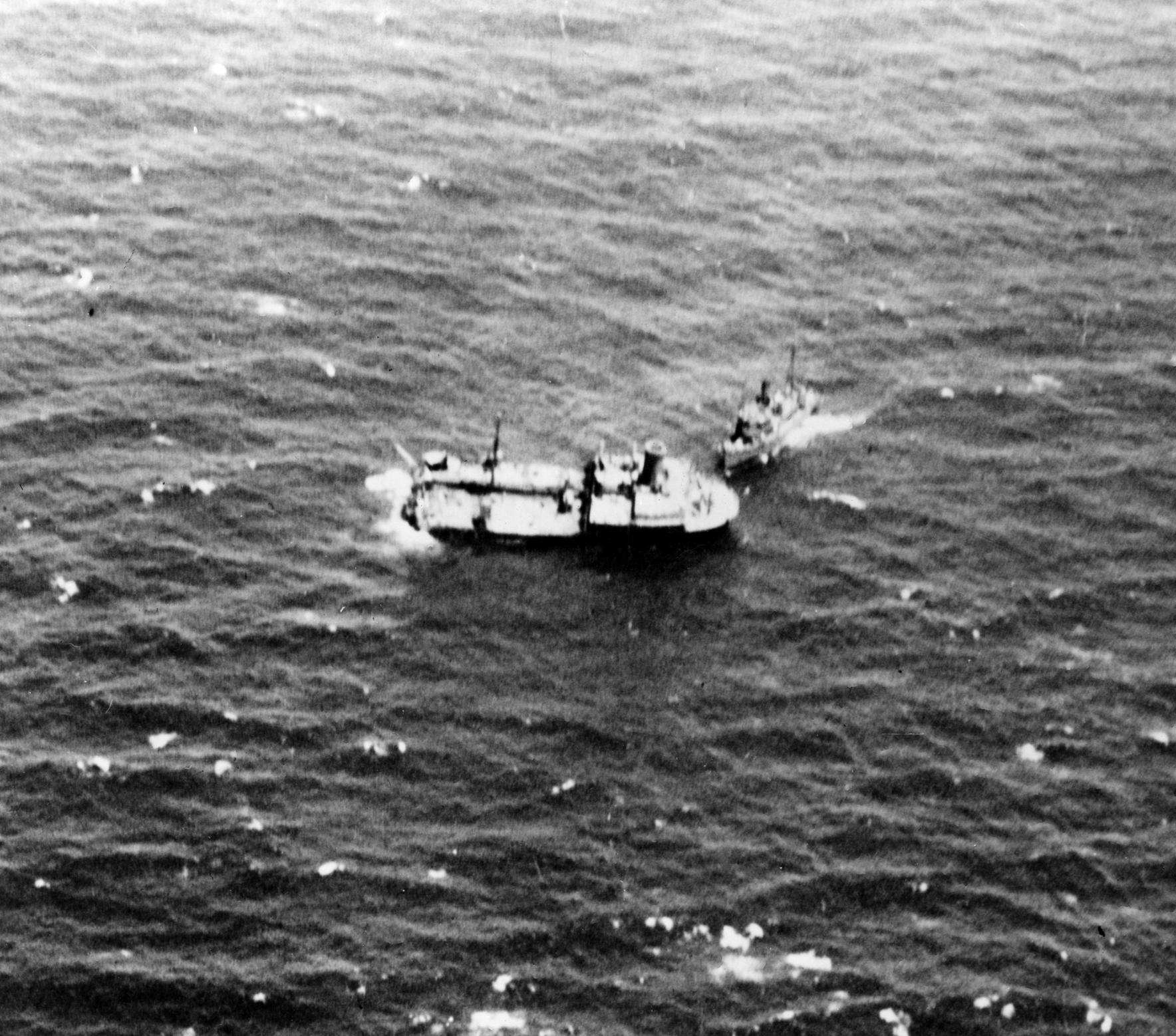
USS Umpqua observing the stern of Esso Nashville

Esso Nashville at Baltimore, being reconstructed

Esso Nashville floated for several hours, held together by her deck plating and hull pipes. The tanker eventually broke in two, the bow sinking but the stern remaining afloat. It was eventually salvaged by USS Umpqua, a United States Navy tugboat, under "difficult conditions." She was listing about forty degrees to port, her starboard bridge keel was above the water, and the port side of the main deck near the poop deck was only 3 feet (0.91 m) above the waterline. Several cargo tanks were broken and open to the water.

The stern was brought into an upright position by pumping out water from the engine room and running water into the No. 8 starboard tank. The Hatteras Oil Company ran a steam line from their plant on a nearby dock to help pump the engine room dry. Two tugboats from the Moran Towing Company were dispatched to the scene to help take Esso Nashville's stern section to Morehead City, North Carolina. She arrived on March 26. She left for Baltimore on March 28, and arrived on June 1.

In Baltimore, Esso Nashville was examined by divers. They found twisted torn and steel on the base line of the salvaged portion that would make it difficult to put her into a dry dock. An underwater cutting apparatus was used to remove the obstacles. The No. 7 and wing cargo tanks were repaired, and large weights were then placed in them to trim the section to an acceptable draft, where she could be safely taken to the dry dock. Water was slowly pumped out to avoid disturbing Esso Nashville, resting on the keel blocks.

A fixed point at the head of the dock was determined after ensuring the hull was in the proper position. A new base line of the keel was determined from this point, and the keel blocks were moved accordingly. Cradle bars were installed outwards towards the bilge line, and the tanker's dead rise was obtained from her original drawings. About two-thirds Esso Nashville had to be prefabricated with the original drawings in sections weighing anywhere between 6 and 8 short tons (5,400 and 7,300 kg). These were placed on lighters and taken to the yard for erection aboard the tanker.

About 300 feet (91 m) of length, 64 feet (20 m) of beam, and 34 feet (10 m) of depth were needed for the forward section. Among the things built was a new midships house, bridge deck, boat deck, and navigating bridge. New navigation equipment, engine telegraphs, and alarm systems were also installed. All internal sections of the hull were welded or riveted. Roughly 2,100 short tons (1,900,000 kg) of steel were used in the reconstruction.

When the hull was ready for refloating, a second launching ceremony took place. It was officiated by the tanker's original sponsor, Mrs. Hermon Sweeney Atchison. Esso Nashville was subsequently towed to the outfitting dock, ending her stay in drydock what was "practically like building a new ship." She underwent her second round of sea trials and went back into service on March 16, 1943. She left for her first convoy of 1943 the next day, chartered by the War Shipping Administration.

==== Convoy service ====
Esso Nashville initially traveled from Hampton Roads to Key West, Galveston, and Houston. From April until November 1943, Esso Nashville traveled from the East Coast of the United States to various ports in the United Kingdom. These voyages would take the form of the tanker traveling in HX or ON convoys. Between November 1943 and May 1944, she sailed the East Coast to ports in French Morocco and Algeria, taking UGS or GUS convoys. From May to September 1944, Esso Nashville generally sailed in NV or VN, travelling between the cities of Augusta, Georgia, and Naples, Florida. Between October 1944 and February 1945, she independently in the Caribbean. Throughout the remainder of 1945, she partook in one HX convoy, one ON convoy, and one UGS convoy. The remainder of these voyages were independent ones to a wide variety of locations, which included one run to the Soviet port of Odessa in May–June.

=== Post-war ===
In 1950, Esso Nashville was transferred to the Esso Shipping Company of Wilmington, Delaware. She was sold to the Joshua Hendy Corporation of Los Angeles in 1952 and renamed Joshua Hendy. She was sold in 1959 to Olympic Transport, which was owned by M. E. & N. E. Kulukundis, and was renamed Helen.

The tanker was broken up at Onomichi starting February 10, 1963, after having been laid up in Innoshima, Hiroshima since 1960.

== Wreck of the bow ==
The bow of Esso Nashville lies in 100–120 feet (30–37 m) of water off the Outer Banks of North Carolina, at 33°52′44.8″N 077°13′36.3″W. It is intact and lies upside down with a slight starboard list. The highest portion of the wreck lies roughly 15–20 feet (4.6–6.1 m) above the seafloor. The deck portion of the bow is buried under the sand. The hull of Esso Nashville is breaking off and falling to the side, most evident near the tanker's anchors. In the aft portion of the bow, the remains flatten out in a series of collapsed hull plates, masts, and pipes.
