= St. Johns Light =

Lighthouse in Florida, US

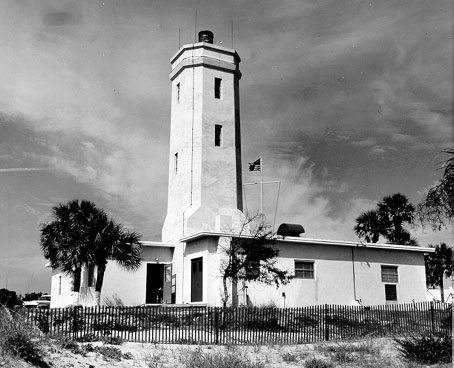
- Location: 3/4 mile (1.2 km) south of the mouth of the St. Johns River, on Naval Station Mayport, Florida
- Coordinates: 30°23′10.14″N 81°23′52.8″W

Tower
- Foundation: Concrete
- Construction: Concrete
- Automated: 1967
- Height: 66 feet (20 m)
- Shape: Square tower with beveled corners
- Markings: White tower on building
- Heritage: National Register of Historic Places listed place

Light
- First lit: 1954
- Focal height: 83 feet (25 m)
- Lens: Crouse-Hinds 250 kilocandela airway beacon (original), VRB-25 system (current)
- Range: 19 nautical miles (35 km; 22 mi)
- Characteristic: Group flashing white 20s
- St. John's Lighthouse
- U.S. National Register of Historic Places
- Built: 1954
- NRHP reference No.: 100002224
- Added to NRHP: March 20, 2018

The St. Johns Light is an active lighthouse in Jacksonville, Florida, marking the mouth of the St. Johns River. Built in 1954, it is located on Naval Station Mayport in the Mayport area. It was erected to replace a lightship, which itself replaced the still-standing Old St. Johns River Light. It is the fourth lighthouse built at the mouth of the St. Johns since 1830. It was listed on the National Register of Historic Places in 2018.

== History ==
The St. Johns Light was erected in 1954 on the grounds of Naval Station Mayport, about 3/4 mile (1.2 km) south of the mouth of the St. Johns River. It is the fourth lighthouse to have stood at Mayport. The first lighthouse was erected in 1830, after the U.S. purchase of Florida, but it was built too close to the water and had to be demolished just three years later. A second lighthouse was erected about a mile upriver in 1835. However, shifting sand dunes often made the light difficult to discern from sea, and by 1853 its foundation had been so affected by erosion that plans were made to replace it. It was abandoned, but its ruins could still be seen in the early 20th century.

In 1858 the Old St. Johns River Light was erected. In order to avoid the problems of its predecessors, it was constructed away from the shoreline and was substantially taller. It was in service for over 70 years until finally being decommissioned in 1929. That year it was replaced by the St. Johns Lightship (LV-84), moored about 8 miles (13 km) offshore of the river's mouth. The oldest surviving building in Mayport, the Old St. Johns River Lighthouse was placed on the National Register of Historic Places in 1976 and restored in 1980.

In 1954 the current St. Johns Light was built to replace the lightship. It was automated in 1967. The structure is made of concrete, poured in one continuous operation. It has never had a traditional lantern, but had an airway-beacon style light from the beginning until 1998 when it was replaced by a Vega VRB-25 system. The structure is 64 feet (20 m) tall and can be seen for 22 miles (35 km).

The east wing was renovated by the United States Coast Guard Northeast Florida Chapter of the Chief Petty Officers Association (CPOA). On September 26, 2014 it was dedicated to retired BMCM John G. Cathey for his hard work dedication and commitment to the Northeast Florida CPOA.
