= Valour (tugboat) =

TV Valour
History
- Operator: Maritrans Operation Company
- Port of registry: United States
- Builder: Main Iron Works of Houma, La.
- In service: 1975
- Identification: IMO number: 7509421; Callsign: WWC4802
- Fate: Sank 40 nmi (74 km; 40 nmi) off Wilmington, North Carolina

General characteristics
- Tonnage: 193 GT
- Length: 125 ft (38 m)
- Beam: 36.16 ft (11.02 m)
- Installed power: 6,000 hp (4,500 kW)
- Crew: 9

TV Valour was an uninspected towing vessel operated by Maritrans Operation Company. Valour was built in 1975 by Main Iron Works of Houma, Louisiana and sank in the early hours of 18 January 2006 approximately 40 nautical miles (74 km) off Wilmington, North Carolina. Three crew members lost their lives.

== Final voyage ==
On 15 January 2006 Valour began a voyage from Delaware to Texas pushing the fully loaded, 175,000 barrels (27,800 m^{3}) tank barge M 192. Prior to departure the tug's fuel, potable water and wash water tanks were topped off. All of the ballast tanks were empty. At 11:30 on the 17th, in anticipation of heavy weather, the captain ordered that the tug be taken out of the notch and transitioned into towing the barge astern. By 15:00 (3pm) that afternoon, with Valour making 7 knots (13 km/h; 8.1 mph) on a course of 200-225° true, and the wind having increased to 25–35 knots (46–65 km/h; 29–40 mph) from the SSW with 5–7-foot (1.5–2.1 m) seas, the chief mate noticed that a slight port list had developed.

=== Ballast operations ===
The Chief Mate, who was the watch officer, then ordered the assistant engineer to pump water for 15 minutes into the #18 starboard ballast tank, which corrected the port list. At 19:30 the captain, who was by then the watch officer, ordered the chief engineer to pump out the #18 starboard ballast tank. The ballast tanks were now all empty again, which left Valour with a slight starboard list. The weather continued to deteriorate, and by 21:30 the winds were south at 50–60 knots (93–111 km/h; 58–69 mph), gusting to 70 kn (130 km/h; 81 mph), with 10-foot (3.0 m) seas. At 22:00 the chief mate went to the wheelhouse and told the captain that there was a slight starboard list (which was consistent with the stability letter. The wind and seas were also pushing the barge to the north, and that strain on the tow wire may have increased the list. At 22:15 the Captain ordered the chief engineer to pump water for 15 minutes into the #18 port ballast tank to correct for the starboard list. Because of poor communications and a lack of established ballasting procedures, water continued to be pumped into that tank for over one hour, at least 45 minutes longer than ordered. At around 23:00-23:15 Valour leveled off and began to list to port. At 23:16 Valour was listing to port and also began rolling to port, alarming the Captain, who then ordered the chief engineer to pump off all ballast. Twenty minutes later, that operation was stopped, and they then began transferring from the #18 port ballast tank to the #18 starboard ballast tank.

=== Cross-connected tanks ===
Aboard Valour the three pairs of port and starboard fuel tanks (#'s 4, 5 & 17) were connected by cross-connect lines equipped with isolation valves. The #12 port and starboard wash water tanks were similarly arranged, with the addition of a smaller secondary cross-over line. These valves were required, by regulation, to be kept closed when underway. Nonetheless, the #5 port and starboard fuel tanks (which were feeding the day tank for the main engines) were left open, and this was a standard practice. During the post-accident dives, it was discovered that the isolation valve between the #4 port and starboard fuel tanks was also left open. In addition, it's probable (but unconfirmed) that the isolation valve on the secondary cross-connect line between the wash water tanks was also left open. The valves are kept closed to prevent hydrostatic balancing between the tanks and to minimize free surface effect, both of which are detrimental to a vessel's stability.

With improper ballast operations causing a substantial port list, fuel inadvertently began to flow by gravity (hydrostatic balancing) from starboard to port, thereby increasing the severity of the list and eventually causing the aft deck to become awash. An unknown amount of sea water is likely to have entered the #19 & 20 aft ballast tanks through their deck vents, reducing reserve buoyancy further and adding more free surface effect. To counteract this the Captain ordered all ballast to be pumped off, then agreed 20 minutes later to stop pumping ballast water out of the #18 port ballast tank and start pumping ballast water into the #18 starboard ballast tank from the sea (the vessel was not configured to allow internal ballast transfers), causing even more loss of reserve buoyancy. All the while, the barge had been creeping up on them and was now just off the port quarter, with the weight of the tow wire hanging off the port side of the tug. All of this was greatly compounded by the chief mate suffering a fatal fall down the ladder from the wheelhouse and then the loss of an able seaman overboard. Shortly after midnight on the 18th the crew finally released the tow to avoid being tripped. Valour continued to list and roll further to port until it was on its side, then sea water began entering the vessel through the engine room vents on the stack deck.

=== Sinking ===
At approximately 02:30 on 18 January 2006, listing heavily to port and going down by the stern, Valour sank approximately 40 nautical miles (74 km) off Cape Fear, North Carolina. The captain and five crew members, including the chief engineer, were rescued by the tug Justine Foss. The chief engineer, however, died on board shortly afterward of hypothermia. A total of three lives were lost in this incident: the chief mate, chief engineer and an able seaman.

== Coast Guard investigation ==
The Coast Guard investigation found that the causes of the sinking were gale to storm-force weather, vessel design shortcomings, loss of stability, and human factors.

The vessel's design shortcomings included a lack of valve position indicators for the isolation valves on the tank cross-overs, and a lack of tank level indicators.

The loss of stability was caused by a failure to abide by the conditions stipulated in the stability letter. Namely that hydrostatic balancing of the cross-connected fuel tanks occurred because the cross-overs were left open, and that ballasting operations were undertaken to correct the list without first knowing what was causing the list.

The human factors include poor communications, the captain's lack of command presence, the captain's loss of situational awareness regarding the vessel's stability, negligence and misconduct on the part of the captain, negligence on the part of the second mate, and misconduct on the part of the chief and assistant engineers.
