= German submarine U-124 (1940) =

German World War II submarine

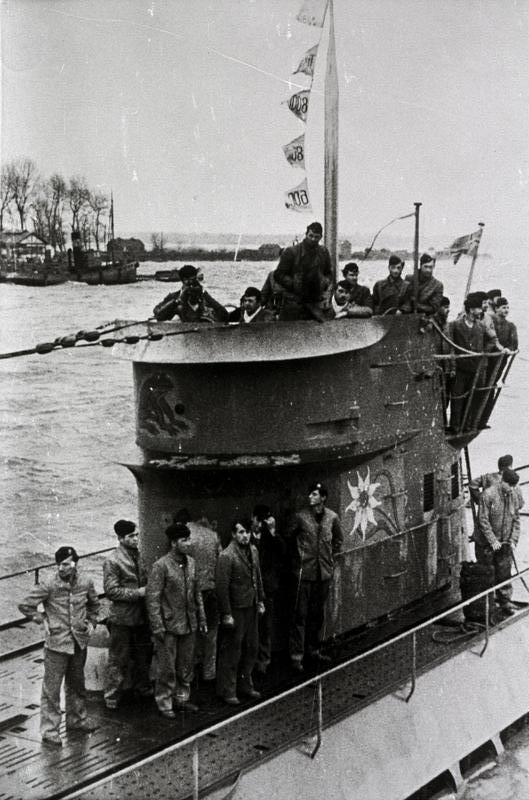
- U-124 after a patrol

History

Nazi Germany
- Name: U-124
- Ordered: 15 December 1937
- Builder: DeSchiMAG AG Weser, Bremen
- Yard number: 956
- Laid down: 11 August 1939
- Launched: 9 March 1940
- Commissioned: 11 June 1940
- Fate: Sunk 2 April 1943

General characteristics
- Class & type: Type IXB submarine
- Displacement: 1,051 tonnes (1,034 long tons) surfaced; 1,178 tonnes (1,159 long tons) submerged
- Length: 76.50 m (251 ft) o/a; 58.75 m (192 ft 9 in) pressure hull
- Beam: 6.76 m (22 ft 2 in) o/a; 4.40 m (14 ft 5 in) pressure hull
- Draught: 4.70 m (15 ft 5 in)
- Installed power: 4,400 PS (3,200 kW; 4,300 bhp) (diesels); 1,000 PS (740 kW; 990 shp) (electric)
- Propulsion: 2 shafts; 2 × diesel engines; 2 × electric motors
- Speed: 18.2 knots (33.7 km/h; 20.9 mph) surfaced; 7.3 knots (13.5 km/h; 8.4 mph) submerged
- Range: 12,000 nmi (22,000 km; 14,000 mi) at 10 knots (19 km/h; 12 mph) surfaced; 64 nmi (119 km; 74 mi) at 4 knots (7.4 km/h; 4.6 mph) submerged
- Test depth: 230 m (750 ft)
- Complement: 4 officers, 44 enlisted
- Armament: 6 × torpedo tubes (4 bow, 2 stern); 22 × 53.3 cm (21 in) torpedoes; 1 × 10.5 cm (4.1 in) SK C/32 deck gun (180 rounds); 1 × 3.7 cm (1.5 in) SK C/30 AA gun; 1 × 2 cm FlaK 30 AA guns

Service record
- Part of: 2nd U-boat Flotilla; 11 June 1940 – 2 April 1943
- Identification codes: M 00 412
- Commanders: Kptlt. Georg-Wilhelm Schulz; 11 June 1940 – 7 September 1941; K.Kapt. Johann Mohr; 8 September 1941 – 2 April 1943
- Operations: 11 patrols: 1st patrol: 19 August – 16 September 1940; 2nd patrol: 5 October – 13 November 1940; 3rd patrol: 16 December 1940 – 22 January 1941; 4th patrol: 23 February – 1 May 1941; 5th patrol: 10 July – 25 August 1941; 6th patrol: 16 September – 1 October 1941; 7th patrol: 30 October – 29 December 1941; 8th patrol: 21 February – 10 April 1942; 9th patrol: 4 May – 26 June 1942; 10th patrol: 25 November 1942 – 13 February 1943; 11th patrol: 27 March – 2 April 1943
- Victories: 46 merchant ships sunk (219,862 GRT); 2 warships sunk (5,775 tons); 4 merchant ships damaged (30,067 GRT)

German submarine U-124 (nickname "Edelweissboot") was a Type IXB U-boat of Nazi Germany's Kriegsmarine during World War II. She operated in the Atlantic as part of the 2nd U-boat flotilla, both west of Scotland and east of the eastern US coast. She was also present off northern South America.

She was sunk with all hands west of Portugal on 2 April 1943.

== Design ==
Type IXB submarines were slightly larger than the original Type IX submarines, later designated IXA. U-124 had a displacement of 1,051 tonnes (1,034 long tons) when at the surface and 1,178 tonnes (1,159 long tons) while submerged. The U-boat had a total length of 76.50 m (251 ft), a pressure hull length of 58.75 m (192 ft 9 in), a beam of 6.76 m (22 ft 2 in), a height of 9.60 m (31 ft 6 in), and a draught of 4.70 m (15 ft 5 in). The submarine was powered by two MAN M 9 V 40/46 supercharged four-stroke, nine-cylinder diesel engines producing a total of 4,400 metric horsepower (3,240 kW; 4,340 shp) for use while surfaced, two Siemens-Schuckert 2 GU 345/34 double-acting electric motors producing a total of 1,000 metric horsepower (740 kW; 990 shp) for use while submerged. She had two shafts and two 1.92 m (6 ft) propellers. The boat was capable of operating at depths of up to 230 metres (750 ft).

The submarine had a maximum surface speed of 18.2 knots (33.7 km/h; 20.9 mph) and a maximum submerged speed of 7.3 knots (13.5 km/h; 8.4 mph). When submerged, the boat could operate for 64 nautical miles (119 km; 74 mi) at 4 knots (7.4 km/h; 4.6 mph); when surfaced, she could travel 12,000 nautical miles (22,000 km; 14,000 mi) at 10 knots (19 km/h; 12 mph). U-124 was fitted with six 53.3 cm (21 in) torpedo tubes (four fitted at the bow and two at the stern), 22 torpedoes, one 10.5 cm (4.13 in) SK C/32 naval gun, 180 rounds, and a 3.7 cm (1.5 in) SK C/30 as well as a 2 cm (0.79 in) C/30 anti-aircraft gun. The boat had a complement of forty-eight.

== Service history ==
U-124 was laid down on 11 August 1939 at the DeSchiMAG AG Weser yard in Bremen as yard number 956. She was launched on 9 March 1940 and commissioned on 11 June, with Kapitänleutnant Georg-Wilhelm Schulz in command. The core of the crew came from Schulz's previous command, U-64, which had been sunk during the Norwegian campaign, the survivors had been rescued by Wehrmacht mountain troops and their badge, the Edelweiss, was painted on U-124's conning tower in appreciation. He was relieved on 8 September 1941 by Korvettenkapitän Johann Mohr, who remained in command until the boat's loss in 1943.

U-124 conducted eleven war patrols, sinking 46 ships, totalling 219,862 gross register tons (GRT) and sinking two warships, totaling 5,775 long tons (5,868 t). She also damaged four ships, totalling 30,067 GRT. She was a member of two wolfpacks.

=== First patrol ===
U-124's first patrol began with her departure from Wilhelmshaven on 19 August 1940. Her route took her across the North Sea and through the gap between the Faroe and Shetland Islands. She attacked three ships northwest of Scotland; Stakesby, Harpalyce and Firecrest, all on the 25th. To avoid retaliation from HMS Godetia, the boat dived to 90 m (300 ft). The Royal Navy Flower-class corvette dropped 12 depth charges. Striking rocks on the sea-bed, the boat lay there for an hour, the corvette lost contact, but the collision had damaged three of her torpedo tubes. As a result, she spent the rest of the patrol reporting on the weather. The submarine docked at Lorient on the French Atlantic coast, on 16 September.

=== Second patrol ===
U-124's second foray was conducted further northwest of the Scottish mainland. Her first victim was Trevisa; sunk on 16 October 1940 218 nmi (404 km; 251 mi) west of Rockall. The next day, 17 October, the Royal Navy River-class submarine HMS Clyde fired three torpedoes at her. All missed, and U-124 remained unaware of the attack. U-124 went on to sink another four ships; Cubano, Sulaco (there was only one survivor) both on 20 October, Rutland on the 31st and Empire Bison on 1 November. The latter ship's four survivors, on a raft when the U-boat came to investigate, played dead as they did not wish to be taken prisoner.

=== Third patrol ===
On her third sortie U-124 sank Empire Thunder north-northeast of Rockall on 6 January 1941.

=== Fourth patrol ===
On her fourth patrol the boat went to the Central Atlantic. U-124 refueled on 4 March in the neutral Spanish port of Las Palmas on the Canary Islands. On 6 March she rendezvoused with the German battleships Scharnhorst and Gneisenau under the command of Günther Lütjens. The ships operated loosely together in order to attack convoy SL 67. Escorting the convoy was the British battleship HMS Malaya. Lütjens wanted the U-boat to sink the Malaya so he could attack and sink the complete convoy. U-124 attacked north of the Cape Verde Islands during the night of 7/8 March and sank four ships: Nardana, Hindpool, Tielbank and Lahore. The Malaya escaped unharmed and the German battleships had to abort their attack.

She then destroyed another seven vessels southwest of Freetown, Sierra Leone: Umona on 30 March, Marlene on 4 April, Portadoc on 7 April, Tweed a day later, Aegeon on the 11th, St. Helena on the 12th and Corinthic on the 13th. 102 people died as a result of Umona's sinking. One account claims that after sinking her, U-124 surfaced and captured the liner's fourth officer from a lifeboat, and that he was never seen again. Corinthic was first struck by a dud torpedo, but another functioned correctly and sank the ship. During this patrol U-124 also rendezvoused with the heavy cruiser Admiral Scheer in order to give her a Quartz spare part for her defective Seetakt radar.

=== Fifth patrol ===
U-124 drew a blank on her fifth sortie, failing to destroy a single target. She scoured the central Atlantic southwest of Gibraltar, but found nothing.

=== Sixth patrol ===
Her sixth patrol was successful. Mohr, (her new commander), rather ambitiously claimed two ships totaling 15,000 tons sunk and a third vessel of 8,000 tons damaged. The reality was rather different. Baltallin (1,303 GRT) on 20 September 1941 and Empire Moat (2,922 GRT) also on the 20th, were both lost from Convoy OG 74; they went down north northeast of the Azores. In addition, Empire Stream was sunk on 25 September. Among the dead were two stowaways. A final effort on 26 September accounted for three more ships, also near the Azores: Petrel, Cortes, and Siremalm (there were no survivors from the latter vessel). U-124 returned to Lorient on 1 October.

=== Seventh patrol ===
After almost a month in her base, U-124 started her seventh patrol on 30 October 1941. On 24 November, she was engaged by the Royal Navy Danae-class cruiser HMS Dunedin which, with two consorts, had been searching for the armed merchant raider Atlantis and her supply ship Python. Dunedin was hit by two torpedoes, despite being outside the theoretical range of the U-boat's projectiles and sank 17 minutes later. 419 men died; there were 67 survivors. The submarine remained in the South Atlantic and sank the American Sagadahoc on 3 December. She was the fourth and last American ship to be sunk by the U-boat Arm prior to the U.S. entry into the war. Following a six-hour chase Mohr fired on Sagadahoc claiming her lights were not set correctly. U-124 was shelled by the coastal battery at Fort Bedford, Georgetown on Ascension Island on 9 December; no damage was sustained.

=== Eighth patrol ===
A change of operational area saw the boat deploy to the Eastern United States seaboard following the success of Operation Drumbeat (Paukenschlag); leaving Lorient on 21 February 1942. Like the original 'drumbeaters', Mohr found the US defences easy to penetrate. The boat scored her first victory before reaching her destination; sinking British Resource about 230 nautical miles (430 km; 260 mi) north of Bermuda on 14 March. She then sank seven ships and damaged two more – all in March. One of them, E.M. Clark, was hit in such a way that her whistle sounded continuously until the ship went down. Another, Esso Nashville, was hit by a torpedo which failed to detonate, but a subsequent torpedo broke the tanker's back. She was held together only by deck plates and piping. The bow and stern sections soon separated, and the bow soon sank. The stern was towed to Baltimore where it was fitted with a new fore-part and the ship returned to service in March 1943. Two more ships were hit before U-124 returned to Lorient. It was her most successful patrol; 68,215 GRT of shipping was lost or incapacitated.

=== Ninth patrol ===
It was back to the mid-Atlantic for the boat's ninth patrol, as part of Wolfpack Hecht, beginning on 4 May 1942. Four ships from Convoy ON 92 were sunk on the 12th. U-124's next victim was the Free French corvette Mimosa which was sunk with heavy loss of life on 9 June. Many of the casualties came from St. Pierre et Miquelon. The impact of the sinking had a lasting effect in the community. Two more ships were sunk before the boat returned to Lorient on 26 June.

=== Tenth patrol ===
Another change of operational zone, this time to the northern coastal area of South America. The submarine left Lorient on 25 November 1942. She sank Trewloras about 50 nautical miles (93 km; 58 mi) east of Port of Spain, Trinidad on 28 December. The boat was attacked by a US Catalina flying boat on 1 January 1943 east of Port of Spain. No damage was caused. She sank four more ships; Broad Arrow, Birmingham City, Collingsworth and Minotaur, all on the ninth. Collingsworth's helmsman swung the ship to port so hard that one torpedo missed by about 10 feet (3 m). Despite the evasive maneuvers, a torpedo hit Minotaur.

=== Eleventh patrol and loss ===
U-124 left Lorient for the last time on 27 March 1943. Heading southwest, she had hardly left the Bay of Biscay when she was attacked by two British warships. The Flower-class corvette HMS Stonecrop and the Black Swan-class sloop HMS Black Swan sank the submarine at 41°02′N 15°39′W west of Porto, Portugal on 2 April 1943. Both ships were escorting Convoy OS 45, from Liverpool to Freetown. All 53 crew members died.

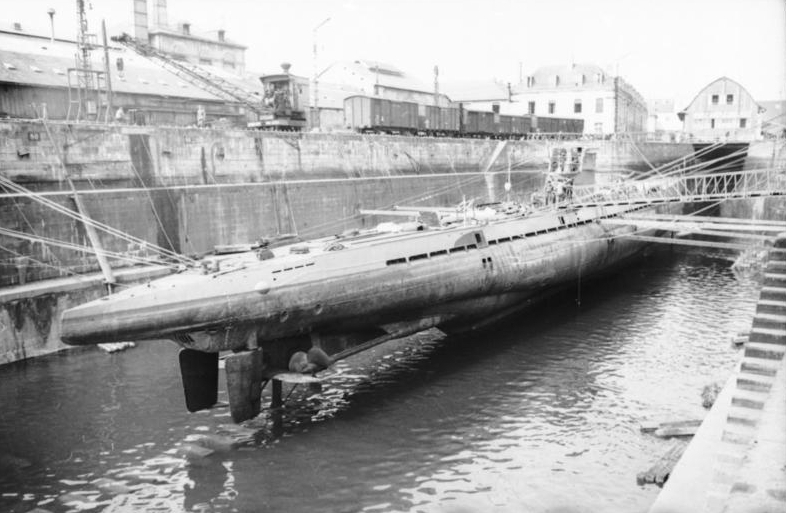
U-37, a U-boat similar to U-124 at Lorient in 1940. Note the twin rudders.

=== Wolfpacks ===
U-124 took part in two wolfpacks, namely:

- Süd (22 July – 5 August 1941)
- Hecht (8 May – 18 June 1942)

== Summary of raiding history ==
Date	Ship	Nationality	Tonnage (Note: Merchant ship tonnages are in gross register tons. Military vessels are listed by tons displacement.)	Fate
25 August 1940	Firecrest	United Kingdom	5,394	Sunk
25 August 1940	Harpalyce	United Kingdom	5,169	Sunk
25 August 1940	Stakesby	United Kingdom	3,900	Damaged
16 October 1940	Trevisa	Canada	1,813	Sunk
20 October 1940	Cubano	Norway	5,810	Sunk
20 October 1940	Sulaco	United Kingdom	5,389	Sunk
31 October 1940	Rutland	United Kingdom	1,437	Sunk
1 November 1940	Empire Bison	United Kingdom	5,612	Sunk
6 January 1941	Empire Thunder	United Kingdom	5,965	Sunk
8 March 1941	Hindpool	United Kingdom	4,897	Sunk
8 March 1941	Lahore	United Kingdom	5,304	Sunk
8 March 1941	Nardana	United Kingdom	7,974	Sunk
8 March 1941	Tielbank	United Kingdom	5,984	Sunk
30 March 1941	Umona	United Kingdom	3,767	Sunk
4 April 1941	Marlene	United Kingdom	6,507	Sunk
7 April 1941	Portadoc	Canada	1,746	Sunk
8 April 1941	Tweed	United Kingdom	2,697	Sunk
11 April 1941	Aegeon	Greece	5,285	Sunk
12 April 1941	St. Helena	United Kingdom	4,313	Sunk
13 April 1941	Corinthic	United Kingdom	4,823	Sunk
20 September 1941	Baltallin	United Kingdom	1,303	Sunk
20 September 1941	Empire Moat	United Kingdom	2,922	Sunk
25 September 1941	Empire Stream	United Kingdom	2,922	Sunk
26 September 1941	Cortes	United Kingdom	1,374	Sunk
26 September 1941	Petrel	United Kingdom	1,354	Sunk
26 September 1941	Siremalm	Norway	2,468	Sunk
26 November 1941	HMS Dunedin	Royal Navy	4,850	Sunk
3 December 1941	Sagadahoc	United States	6,275	Sunk
14 March 1942	British Resource	United Kingdom	7,209	Sunk
17 March 1942	Acme	United States	6,878	Damaged
17 March 1942	Ceiba	Honduras	1,698	Sunk
18 March 1942	E.M. Clark	United States	9,647	Sunk
18 March 1942	Kassandra Louloudis	Greece	5,106	Sunk
19 March 1942	SS Papoose	United States	5,939	Sunk
19 March 1942	W. E. Hutton	United States	7,076	Sunk
21 March 1942	Atlantic Sun	United States	11,355	Damaged
21 March 1942	Esso Nashville	United States	7,934	Damaged
23 March 1942	Naeco	United States	5,373	Sunk
12 May 1942	Cristales	United Kingdom	5,389	Sunk
12 May 1942	Empire Dell	United Kingdom	7,065	Sunk
12 May 1942	Llandover	United Kingdom	4,959	Sunk
12 May 1942	Mount Parnes	United Kingdom	4,371	Sunk
9 June 1942	FFL Mimosa	Free French Naval Forces	925	Sunk
12 June 1942	Dartford	United Kingdom	4,093	Sunk
18 June 1942	Seattle Spirit	United States	5,627	Sunk
28 December 1942	Treworlas	United Kingdom	4,692	Sunk
9 January 1943	Birmingham City	United States	6,194	Sunk
9 January 1943	Broad Arrow	United States	7,718	Sunk
9 January 1943	Collingsworth	United States	5,101	Sunk
9 January 1943	Minotaur	United States	4,554	Sunk
2 April 1943	Gogra	United Kingdom	5,190	Sunk
2 April 1943	Katha	United Kingdom	4,357	Sunk

== Bibliography ==
- Busch, Rainer; Röll, Hans-Joachim (1999). German U-boat commanders of World War II: A Biographical Dictionary. Translated by Brooks, Geoffrey. London, Annapolis, Md: Greenhill Books, Naval Institute Press. ISBN 1-55750-186-6.
- Gröner, Erich; Jung, Dieter; Maass, Martin (1991). U-boats and Mine Warfare Vessels. German Warships 1815–1945. Vol. II. Translated by Thomas, Keith; Magowan, Rachel. London: Conway Maritime Press. ISBN 0-85177-593-4.
- Sharpe, Peter (1998). U-Boat Fact File. Great Britain: Midland Publishing. ISBN 1-85780-072-9.
