= Convoy ON 92 =

Convoy during naval battles of the Second World War

- Part of the Battle of the Atlantic of World War II
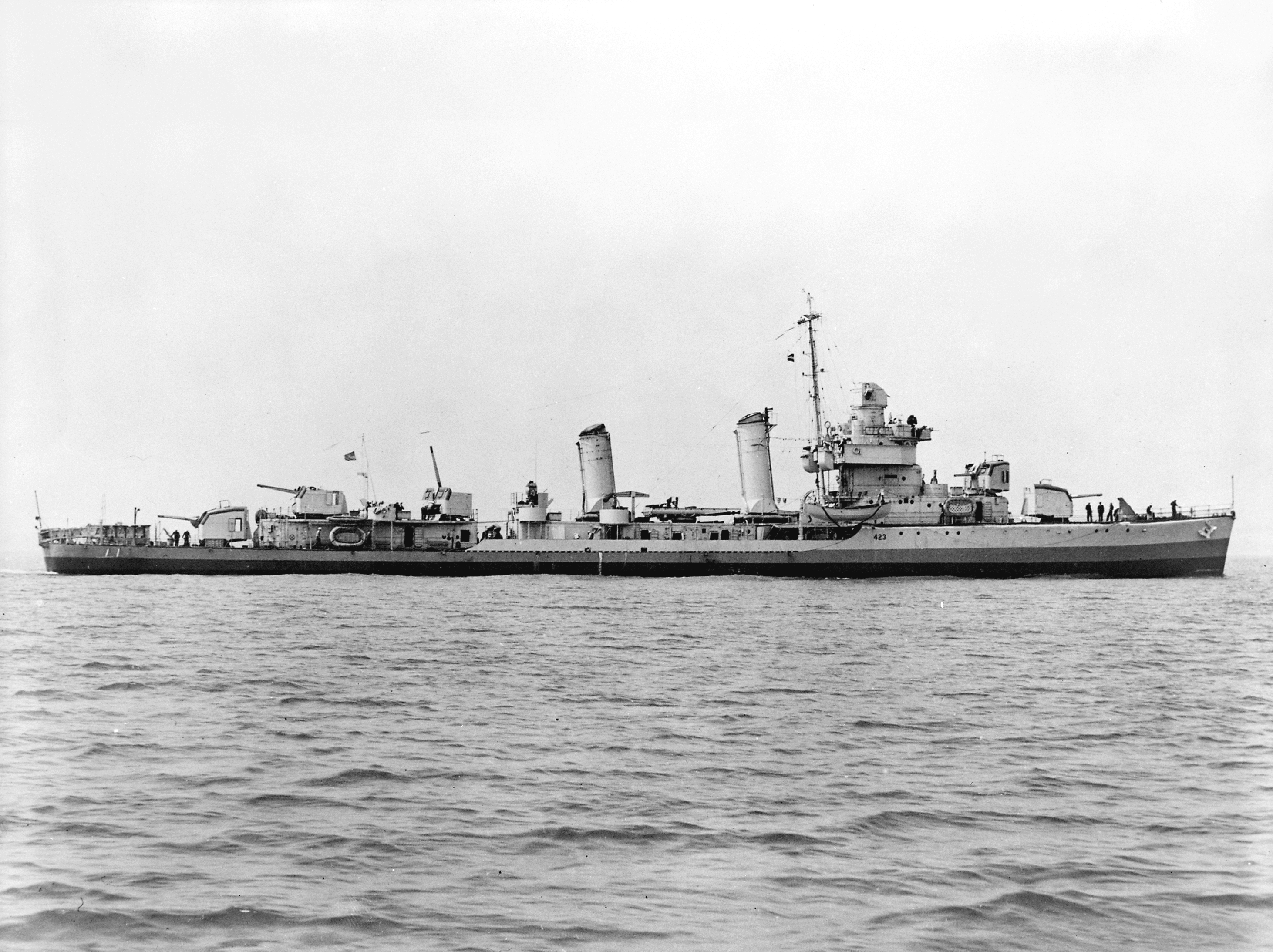
- USS Gleaves, 18 June 1941
Date	6–21 May 1942
Location	North Atlantic
Result	German victory

Belligerents
Germany	United Kingdom; United States; Canada

Commanders and leaders
BdU: Karl Dönitz	Comm: R Gill; SOE: J Heffernan

Strength
9 submarines	1 destroyer 4 corvettes 1 cutter 46 merchant ships

Casualties and losses
None	9 killed 7 merchant ships sunk 1 merchant ship damaged

Convoy ON 92 was a trade convoy of merchant ships during the Second World War. It was the 92nd of the numbered series of ON convoys Outbound from the British Isles to North America. The ships departed from Liverpool on 6 May 1942 and were joined on 7 May by Mid-Ocean Escort Force Group A-3.

The convoy was discovered by Wolfpack Hecht on 11 May; seven ships were sunk before the U-boats lost contact with the convoy on 13 May. Surviving ships reached Halifax, Nova Scotia on 21 May.

== Prelude ==
ON 92 was a west-bound convoy of 42 ships, either in ballast or carrying trade goods, and sailed from Liverpool on 6 May 1942 bound for ports in North America. The convoy commodore was Capt. R Gill in Southern Princess.

It was escorted by mid-ocean escort group A-3, comprising the United States Navy destroyer Gleaves (Capt. J Heffernan as Senior Officer Escort), the United States Coast Guard cutter Spencer, and four Royal Canadian Navy corvettes Algoma, Arvida, Bittersweet and Shediac. The convoy was supported by a rescue ship, the North Sea packet Bury. Two of the merchant ships were equipped as CAM ships, with a catapult-launched Hurricane fighter as temporary air cover. Heffernan had a background in destroyers and anti-submarine warfare but was inexperienced in convoy protection, as was his group. Only Bittersweet had the new 10 cm radar, and only the rescue ship Bury had HF/DF.

ON 92's passage was barred by the patrol group "Hecht", comprising six Type VII U-boats. Of these two commanders were experienced Knight's Cross holders, while the others were on their first Atlantic patrol.

== Action ==
After making rendezvous with its ocean escort ON 92 proceeded west, following along the great circle route to reduce distance. However German intelligence (B-Dienst) was aware of its passage, and U-boat Command (BdU) was able to send group "Hecht" in pursuit. On the morning of 11 May U-569 made contact and began to shadow. Its transmissions were detected by Bury, which was confirmed by the Admiralty that afternoon but Heffernan made no response until 1700, when he led Gleaves and Spencer in a wide sweep around the convoy. At 1749 Gleaves sighted a U-boat 17 miles (27 km) ahead and both proceeded to attack, continuing until after midnight. Meanwhile, two more U-boats were in contact, U-94 and U-124, both commanded by Knights Cross holders. After sunset the commodore ordered evasive maneuvers, but without success, and at 2300 U-124 attacked, sinking Empire Dell and damaging Llanover. A second attack by U-124 hit Mount Parnes and Cristales, while U-94 hit Cocles. Algoma sighted one and counter-attacked but with no success. At this point Gleaves and Spencer rejoined the convoy and no more attacks developed. Arvida and Shediac were able to pick up survivors, with Bury.

On 12 May the three U-boats in contact were joined by three more "Hecht" boats, U-96, U-406 and U-590, and all six continued to shadow. At 1300 Heffernan again detached Gleaves and Spencer in a sweep around the convoy; at 1943 Spencer sighted two U-boats 27 miles (43 km) northwest of the convoy, and engaged with gunfire, while at the same time Gleaves made a sonar contact 18 miles (29 km) southeast and again began an anti-submarine hunt.

At 2253 the U-boats around the convoy attacked again, U-94 hitting Batna. She was counter-attacked by Bittersweet, but escaped. Both ships fired star shell, which brought Gleaves and Spencer back to the convoy. At 0310 on 13 May U-94 had a final success, hitting Tolken, but was driven off by defensive gunfire from the merchant. At this point foul weather closed in and the pack lost contact.

No further attacks developed and on 13 May Bury, with 178 survivors on board, was detached to St Johns, escorted by Arvida. The convoy was joined by units of Western Local Escort Force on 17 May and made port at Halifax on 21 May.

== Aftermath ==
ON 92 lost seven ships of a total of 42 that set out. The Admiralty and Western Approaches Command (WAC) were unimpressed with Heffernan's performance, particularly as he described it in his report as a success, commenting "all escorts are entitled to credit for a highly satisfactory performance." WAC disagreed, feeling the group had "failed lamentably" in its defence of ON 92. The commodores report sums up the episode by commenting "Gleaves was never there when ON 92 was attacked." After this Heffernan was moved to other duties, with leadership of A-3 being passed to USCG commander P Heineman of the cutter Campbell.

BdU had reason to be pleased with the sinking of seven merchant ships from the convoy, although this was the only successful attack on any North Atlantic convoy in the month of May. It was also noticeable that the only success fell to the two experienced commanders; the other four "Hecht" skippers achieved nothing.

== Ships in the convoy ==
=== Merchant ships ===
Name	Flag	Tonnage (GRT)	Notes
Achilles (1906)	Netherlands	1,815	Bound for St John's, Newfoundland
Alex (1914)	United Kingdom	3,932	Bound for Halifax
Batna (1928)	United Kingdom	4,399	Sunk By U-94 SE of Cape Farewell, Greenland On 13 May. 1 dead. Survivors picked up by Bury
Belinda (1939)	Norway	8,325	Bound for Corpus Christi, Texas
British Power (1936)	United Kingdom	8,451	Bound for Houston
Bury (1911)	United Kingdom	1,686	Convoy rescue ship bound for Halifax. Carrying equipment for High-frequency direction finding
Carras (1918)	Greece	5,234	Bound for Father Point, Quebec
Chagres (1919)	Panama	5,545	Bound for Boston
Clearpool (1935)	United Kingdom	5,404	Bound for Father Point, Quebec
Cocle (1920)	Panama	5,630	Sunk By U-94 on 12 May 740 nautical miles (1,370 km) SE of Cape Farewell, Greenland. 5 dead. Survivors picked up by Bury and landed at St. John's, Newfoundland.
Cristales (1926)	United Kingdom	5,389	Sunk by U-124 on 12 May SE of Cape Farewell, Greenland. 0 dead. Abandoned and sunk by gunfire from HMCS Shediac. Survivors picked up by Shediac and USCGC Spencer and landed at Boston.
Dean Emery (1919)	Panama	6,664	Bound for Beaumont, Texas
Dimitrios Chandris (1910)	Greece	4,643	Returned
Dorcasia (1938)	United Kingdom	8,053	Bound for Houston
Dorington Court (1939)	United Kingdom	5,281	Bound for New York City
Elisabeth Lensen (1910)	United Kingdom	4,212	Bound for Father Point, Quebec
Empire Antelope (1919)	United Kingdom	4,945	Bound for Halifax. Ship's Master is Vice-Commodore
Empire Chamois (1918)	United Kingdom	5,684	Bound for Baltimore
Empire Clive (1941)	United Kingdom	7,069	CAM Ship. Bound for Halifax
Empire Dell (1941)	United Kingdom	7,065	CAM ship. Sunk by U-124 on 12 May. 2 dead. Survivors picked up by HMCS Shediac and Bury, and landed at St. John's, Newfoundland
Empire Wolfe (1941)	United Kingdom	2,888	Bound for Halifax
Errington Court (1925)	United Kingdom	4,913	Bound for River Clyde
Evanger (1920)	Norway	3,869	
Fort Binger (1919)	United Kingdom	5,671	With torpedo damage (uxb), in the port bow, from U-588 on 18 May. 1 dead. Fog closed in, so U-boat lost contact and the Fort Binger docked for repairs in Yarmouth before making it to Halifax
Gazcon (1932)	United Kingdom	4,224	
Grey Lag (1910)	Panama	3,312	Bound for Halifax
Ivan Topic (1920)	Yugoslavia	4,943	Bound for New York City
Juno (1908)	Netherlands	1,763	Bound for New York City
Langleebrook (1930)	United Kingdom	4,246	Bound for New York City
Lisbeth (1922)	Norway	2,732	Bound for Halifax
Llanover (1928)	United Kingdom	4,959	Sunk by U-124 SE of Cape Farewell, Greenland on 12 May. 0 Dead. Scuttled by HMCS Arvida. Survivors picked up by Bury and landed at St. John's, Newfoundland
Mount Parnes (1917)	Greece	4,371	Sunk by U-124 on 12 May 650 nautical miles (1,200 km) SE of Cape Farewell, Greenland. 0 dead.
Mount Rhodope (1919)	Greece	5,182	Bound for Montreal
Mount Taurus (1920)	Greece	6,696	Bound for Montreal
Portsea (1938)	United Kingdom	1,583	Bound for Pictou
Ragnhild (1941)	Norway	2,866	Bound for Father Point, Quebec
San Ambrosio (1935)	United Kingdom	7,410	
Selvik (1920)	Norway	1,557	
Selvistan (1924)	United Kingdom	5,136	Bound for Halifax
Solarium (1936)	United Kingdom	6,239	Bound for Baton Rouge
Southern Princess (1915)	United Kingdom	2,156	Bound for Boston. Capt R Gill CBE Rd RNR (Commodore)
Spokane (1929)	Panama	2,882	Bound for Charleston, South Carolina
Suecia (1912)	Sweden	4,966	Returned
Titanian (1924)	Norway	4,880	Bound for Father Point, Quebec
Tolken (1922)	Sweden	4,471	Sunk by U-94 675 nautical miles (1,250 km) SE of Cape Farewell, Greenland On 13 May. 0 dead. Survivors picked up by Bury and landed at St. John's, Newfoundland
Zypenberg (1920)	Netherlands	4,973	Bound for New York City

=== Convoy escorts ===
Name	Flag	Type	Joined	Left
USS Gleaves	United States Navy	Gleaves-class destroyer	7 May 1942	18 May 1942
USCGC Spencer	United States Coast Guard	Treasury-class cutter	7 May 1942	18 May 1942
HMCS Algoma	Royal Canadian Navy	Flower-class corvette	7 May 1942	18 May 1942
HMCS Arvida	Royal Canadian Navy	Flower-class corvette	7 May 1942	14 May 1942
HMCS Bittersweet	Royal Canadian Navy	Flower-class corvette	7 May 1942	18 May 1942
HMCS Shediac	Royal Canadian Navy	Flower-class corvette	7 May 1942	16 May 1942

== U-boats ==
The convoy was attacked by Wolfpack Hecht, which consisted of eight U-boats, namely:

- U-94 (Type VIIC) : 3 ships sunk
- U-96 (Type VIIC) : no success
- U-116 Type XB : supply boat
- U-124 Type IXB : 4 ships sunk
- U-406 (Type VIIC) : no success
- U-569 (Type VIIC) : no success
- U-578 (Type VIIC) : no success
- U-590 (Type VIIC) : no success

== In popular culture ==
The convoy battle is the setting for the Sabaton song Wolfpack off their debut album Primo Victoria.

== Bibliography ==
- Blair, Clay (1996). Hitler's U-Boat War: The Hunters 1939-1942. ISBN 0-304-35260-8.
- Edwards, Bernard (1996). Donitz and the Wolf Packs. ISBN 1-86019-927-5.
- Hague, Arnold (2000). The Allied Convoy System 1939–1945. ISBN 1-86176-147-3.
- Milner, Marc (1985). North Atlantic Run: The Royal Canadian Navy and the Battle for the Convoys. Toronto: University of Toronto. ISBN 0-8020-2544-7.
- Rohwer, J.; Hummelchen, G. (1992). Chronology of the War at Sea 1939–1945. Naval Institute Press. ISBN 1-55750-105-X.
