= Wolfpack Hecht =

Wolfpack of German U-Boats

Hecht (English: "Pike") was the name of two "wolfpacks" of German U-boats that operated during World War II.

== First wolfpack "Hecht' ==
The first wolfpack code-named Hecht, comprising three U-boats, operated east of Iceland from 27 January to 4 February 1942. During this period one Allied convoy passed through Hecht's patrol area, Arctic convoy PQ 9/10, comprising ten merchant ships bound for the Soviet Union. It departed Reykjavík on 1 February and was undetected, arriving without incident at Murmansk on 10 February. After this Hecht was disbanded, with U-352 and U-455 continuing to the North Atlantic, while U-435 remained on station for four more days before heading north to join patrol group Umbau in the Barents Sea.

=== U-boats, commanders and dates ===
- U-352
- U-435
- U-455

== Second wolfpack "Hecht' ==
The second operated in the North Atlantic from 8 May to 18 June 1942. During this period Hecht successfully attacked three west-bound convoys, and sank 14 ships for a total of 62,709 gross register tons (GRT). After forming in the Atlantic on 8 May the Hecht boats headed west, sighting slow convoy ON 92 south of Iceland. They attacked over the next three days and sank seven ships without loss.

On 20 May Hecht boats sighted slow convoy ON 94 east of the Grand Banks, but lost it in fog.

On 31 May ON 96 was sighted south of Cape Farewell, but this was also lost in worsening weather.

On 8 June convoy ON 100 was sighted five days out from the UK; an attack developed which sank five ships and an escort vessel over four days, again without loss.

On 12 June convoy ON 102 was sighted, but attacks over three days and nights brought little success; one ship was sunk, but two U-boats were damaged so severely they had to return to base.

At this point BdU brought Hecht's patrol to an end.

=== U-boats, commanders and dates ===
- U-404, Otto von Bülow, 8–11 May
- U-94, Otto Ites, 8 May–16 June
- U-124, Johann Mohr, 8 May–18 June
- U-406, Horst Dieterichs, 8 May–18 June
- U-569, Hans-Peter Hinsch, 8 May–18 June
- U-590, Heinrich Müller-Edzards, 8 May–18 June
- U-578, Ernst-August Rehwinkel, 9–11 May
- U-96, Hans-Jürgen Hellriegel, 11 May–18 June
- U-116, Werner von Schmidt, 26–29 May

== Ships hit by this wolfpack ==
=== From convoy ONS 92 ===
==== Empire Dell & Llanover ====
Around 02:00 on 12 May 1942, U-124 fired three torpedoes and hit the 7,065-ton British CAM ship Empire Dell and the 4,959-ton British collier Llanover. The Master, 38 crew and seven Royal Air Force personnel from Empire Dell were rescued before she sank. Two crew members were lost. The badly damaged Llanover was scuttled by HMCS Arvida. Her crew of 46; Master, 39 men, and 6 gunners were rescued.

==== Cocle ====
At 03:40 on 12 May the 5,630-ton Panamanian merchant ship Cocle was torpedoed and sunk by U-94. Only 38 survivors from her crew of 42 were picked up by the British rescue ship Bury.

==== Cristales & Mount Parnes ====
At 03:55 on 12 May U-124 attacked again, firing two torpedoes and hitting the 5,389-ton British merchant ship Cristales and the 4,371-ton Greek merchant ship Mount Parnes. The crew of Cristales abandoned ship, and all 65, plus 7 gunners and 10 passengers were rescued, while their ship was later sunk by gunfire by HMCS Shediac. After her 33 crew abandoned ship, Mount Parnes was also scuttled by an escort vessel.

==== Batna ====
At 03:51 on 13 May, the 4,399-ton British collier Batna was torpedoed and sunk by U-94. One crew member was lost while the master, 34 crewmen and six gunners were picked up by the British rescue ship Bury.

==== Tolken ====
At 06:18 on 13 May, the 4,471-ton Swedish merchant ship Tolken was hit by a single torpedo from U-94. The U-boat was driven off by the convoy escorts, but returned at 09:30. Approaching the damaged ship on the surface, the U-boat was shot by the ship's machine guns. At 10:20 the U-boat attacked again with torpedoes. The first failed to explode, but the second five minutes later hit and sank the ship. There were no losses amongst the ship's crew of 34, and all were picked up by the British rescue ship Bury.

=== Independent passage ===
==== Maria da Gloria ====
At 22:10 on 5 June U-94 shelled an unmarked sailing ship. The ship stopped after being hit by two rounds, the U-boat ceased fire, and the crew abandoned ship. Then at 22:50 the schooner was sunk by U-boat's gunfire. She turned out to be the 320-ton neutral Portuguese fishing boat Maria da Gloria, and only 8 from her crew of 44 survived.

=== From convoy ONS 100 ===
==== FFL Mimosa ====
At 04:10 on 9 June, the Free French Navy Flower-class corvette Mimosa (J6254) was hit by one of two torpedoes fired by U-124, and sank immediately after the boilers exploded. The commander, 58 French sailors and 6 British sailors, were lost. The four survivors were picked up by HMCS Assiniboine.

==== Empire Clough & Ramsay ====
At 03:40 hours on 10 June, U-94 fired three torpedoes at a group of three ships from the convoy, and hit and sank two British merchant ships; the 6,147-ton Empire Clough, and the 4,855-ton Ramsay.

==== Pontypridd ====
At 14:46 on 11 June, the 4,458-ton British merchant ship Pontypridd was hit by two torpedoes fired by U-569, seriously damaging her. At 16:06, U-94 fired the coup de grâce at the straggling ship, which sank an hour later. Two crew members were lost, and the master was taken prisoner by U-569, and was confined to the Milag Nord POW camp, while 42 crewmen and three gunners were later picked up by HMCS Chambly.

==== Dartford ====
At 06:12 on 12 June the 4,093-ton British merchant ship Dartford was torpedoed and sunk by U-124.

=== From convoy ONS 102 ===
==== Seattle Spirit ====
At about 06.20 on 18 June, U-124 fired two spreads of two torpedoes at three ships of Convoy ONS 102, en route from Murmansk to New York. One torpedo struck the 5,627-ton American merchant ship Seattle Spirit, causing flooding and a boiler explosion which killed one officer and two men below. The remaining 9 officers, 28 men, 11 armed guards (the ship was armed with a 4-inch (100 mm) gun, four .50 caliber and four .30 caliber machine guns) and 7 passengers abandoned ship in lifeboats. They were picked up by the corvette HMCS Agassiz, and Seattle Spirit was shelled and sunk at 20:30 by Agassiz after it was determined she could not be salvaged.

== Bibliography ==
- Blair, Clay (1996). Hitler's U-Boat War: The Hunters 1939-1942. Cassell. ISBN 0-304-35260-8.
- Edwards, Bernard (1996) Donitz and the Wolf Packs ISBN 1-86019-927-5
- Ruegg, Bob; Hague, Arnold (1992). Convoys to Russia 1941–1945. Kendal, UK: World Ship Society. ISBN 0-905617-66-5.
