= USS Gleaves =

Gleaves-class destroyer

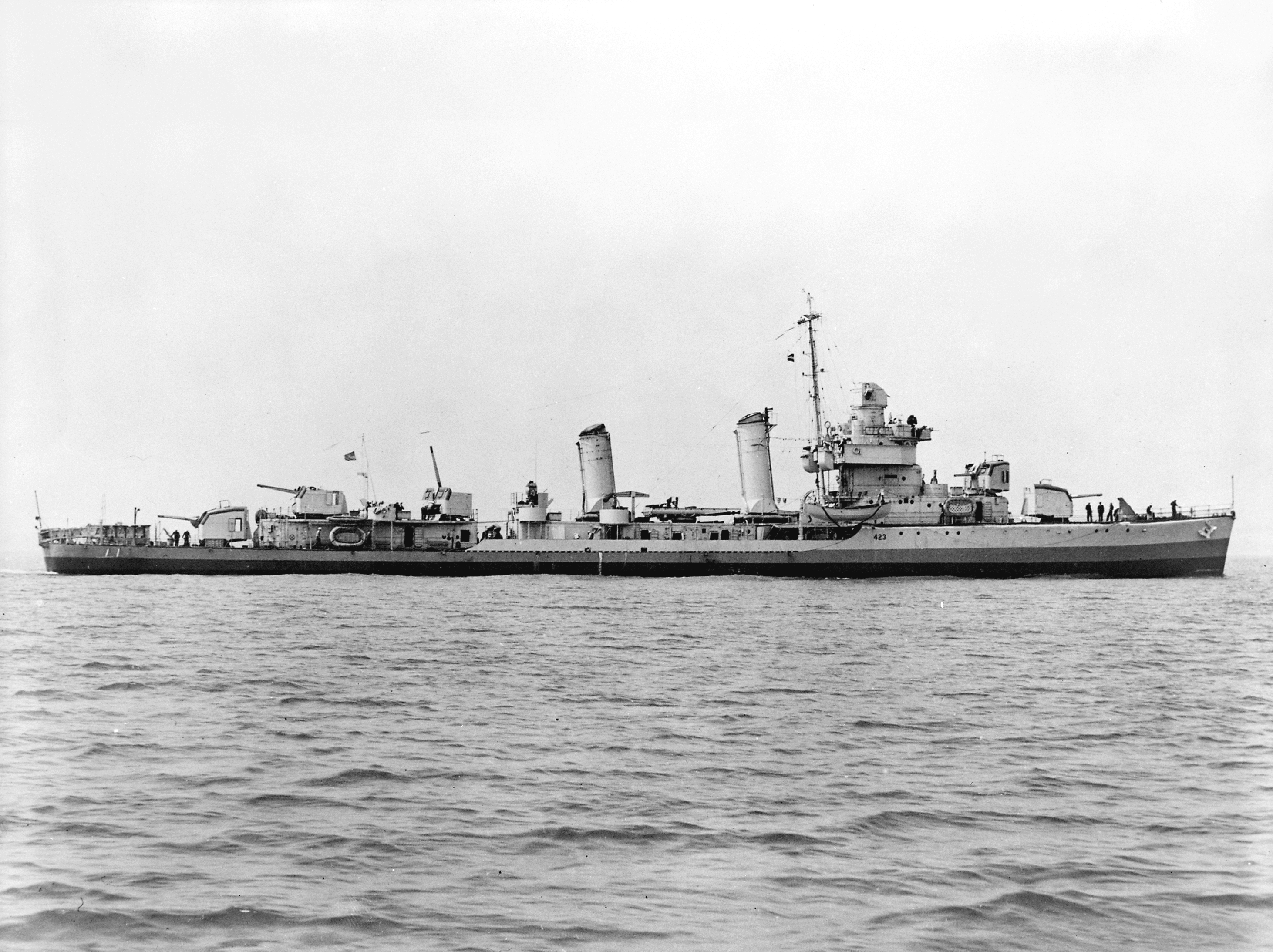
- USS Gleaves

History

United States
- Name: Gleaves
- Namesake: Albert Gleaves
- Builder: Bath Iron Works
- Laid down: 16 May 1938
- Launched: 9 December 1939
- Commissioned: 14 June 1940
- Decommissioned: 8 May 1946
- Stricken: 1 November 1969
- Identification: Callsign: NAMB
- Fate: Sold 29 June 1972 and broken up for scrap

General characteristics
- Class & type: Gleaves-class destroyer
- Displacement: 1,630 tons
- Length: 348 ft 3 in (106.15 m)
- Beam: 36 ft 1 in (11.00 m)
- Draft: 13 ft 2 in (4.01 m)
- Propulsion: 50,000 shp (37,000 kW); 4 boilers; 2 propellers
- Speed: 37.4 knots (69 km/h)
- Range: 6,500 nmi (12,000 km; 7,500 mi) at 12 kn (22 km/h; 14 mph)
- Complement: 16 officers, 260 enlisted
- Armament: 5 × 5 in (127 mm) DP guns, 6 × .50 cal (12.7 mm) guns, 10 × 21 in (533 mm) torpedo tubes, 2 × depth charge tracks

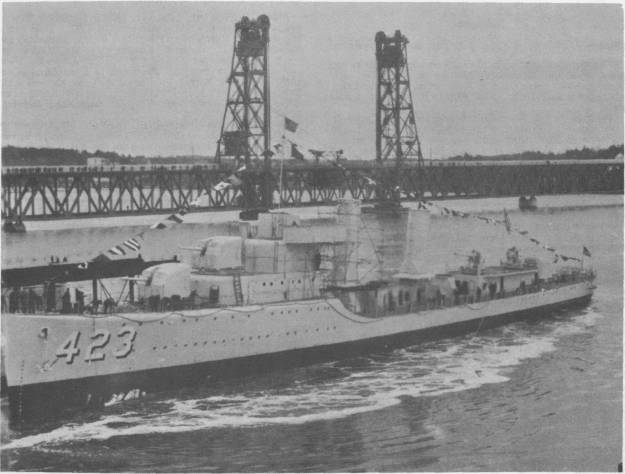
Gleaves leaves the building ways, 9 December 1939

USS Gleaves (DD-423) was the lead ship of the Gleaves class of destroyers. She is the only ship of the United States Navy to be named for Admiral Albert Gleaves, who is credited with improving the accuracy and precision of torpedoes and other naval arms.

Gleaves was launched by the Bath Iron Works, Bath, Maine, 9 December 1939, sponsored jointly by Miss Evelina Gleaves Van Metre and Miss Clotilda Florence Cohen, granddaughters of Admiral Gleaves; and commissioned 14 June 1940, at Boston Navy Yard.

== World War II ==
=== Atlantic convoys ===
Departing for shakedown training soon after commissioning, Gleaves operated off the Atlantic coast and in Caribbean waters until returning to Boston 19 March 1941 to prepare for convoy duty. She departed Newport on her first voyage 23 June 1941. and saw her convoy arrive safely at Iceland. After patrolling in Icelandic waters for a time, she returned to Boston 23 July.

Subsequently, Gleaves made four other convoy voyages to Iceland, Ireland, and North Africa protecting the vital flow of supplies to the European Theater. As the pace of German submarine attacks increased, she made more and more attacks on U-boats, but recorded no confirmed kills. On 11–12 May 1942, despite the efforts of Gleaves and the other escort vessels, seven ships of the convoy ONS 92 were lost in two separate attacks by a large wolfpack.

=== Convoys escorted ===
Convoy	Escort Group	Dates	Notes
	Task force 19	1–7 July 1941	occupation of Iceland prior to US declaration of war
ON 18		24 Sept-2 Oct 1941	from Iceland to Newfoundland prior to US declaration of war
HX 154		12-19 Oct 1941	from Newfoundland to Iceland prior to US declaration of war
ON 30		2-9 November 1941	from Iceland to Newfoundland prior to US declaration of war
HX 164		10-19 December 1941	from Newfoundland to Iceland
ON 49		27 December-5 January 1942	from Iceland to Newfoundland
HX 171		22-30 January 1942	from Newfoundland to Iceland
ON 62		7-13 February 1942	from Iceland to Newfoundland
HX 178	MOEF group A3	6–16 March 1942	from Newfoundland to Northern Ireland
ON 79	MOEF group A3	24 March-3 April 1942	from Northern Ireland to Newfoundland
HX 185	MOEF group A3	18–26 April 1942	from Newfoundland to Northern Ireland
ON 92	MOEF group A3	7–18 May 1942	from Northern Ireland to Newfoundland
AT 18		6-17 August 1942	troopships from New York City to Firth of Clyde

=== European invasions ===
After returning to Boston 31 March 1942, Gleaves departed 10 May for participation in the Allied landings in Sicily. After engaging in support and convoy operations in the battle zone, Gleaves and Plunkett accepted the surrender of the Italian garrison on the island of Ustica 5 August 1943, and later landed occupation troops on the island. She also drove off a group of five enemy E-boats attempting to attack shipping in the harbor of Palermo, Sicily.

As Allied preparations for the invasion of Italy reached a climax, Gleaves bombarded the Italian mainland. In September 1943 she helped clear the way for the Salerno landing forces. Following the assault, Gleaves convoyed shipping in the Mediterranean area in support of the drive north from Salerno.

When German air and land forces combined in a determined attempt to stop the landings at Anzio in January 1944, Gleaves was again on hand to lend decisive gunfire support and antiaircraft cover. In May of that year she attempted to search out and destroy the German submarine U-616 but other ships of the group sank the U-boat. Survivors from the sunken U-boat were picked up by Gleaves 17 May.

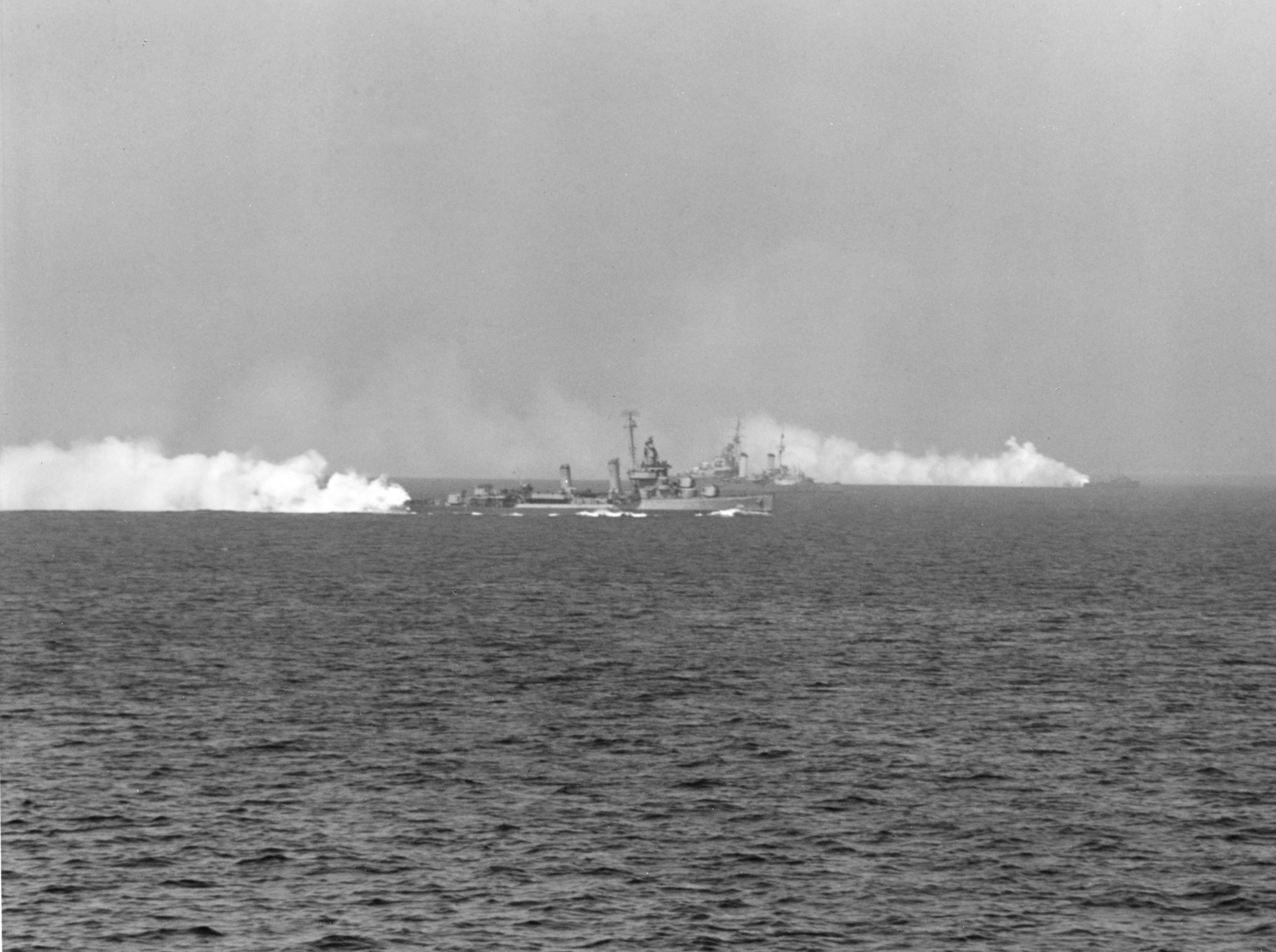
USS Gleaves laying a smoke screen off Southern France, 18 August 1944. HMS Dido can be seen behind her.

Gleaves next took part in the invasion of southern France in August 1944. She escorted the Rangers in their initial landings; bombarded shore installations in support of the main assault; and screened heavier units of the fleet off shore.

On 1 October, Army Cub pilots discovered German MAS boats in the harbor at San Remo, Italy. A determined bombardment in the face of heavy return fire brought about the destruction of at least three of those craft and demolished the boat repair facilities and other harbor installations around the port. Gleaves also found time to destroy at least one 88 mm (3 in) battery which had proven a hazard during the bombardment. The following day, assisted by aircraft from USS Brooklyn, she bombarded shore establishments, battery positions and shipping in the harbor of Oneglia, Italy, obtaining hits on two large enemy cargo ships, destroying one coast defense battery and one anti-aircraft battery near the harbor. During that action Gleaves received some of the few battle scars of her career when an 88-millimeter shell landed close aboard and perforated her hull with shrapnel splinters.

During the night, while patrolling off San Remo, Gleaves' radar spotted three enemy vessels moving down the coast. Unassisted she drove in at them in spite of reported mine fields and succeed at destroying one, driving the other two to shelter. Later during that night the remaining two were again detected trying to reach San Remo. Again, Gleaves went into the attack and this time destroyed a second vessel in the group and drove the third back to Genoa, probably in a damaged condition.

While returning to her station off San Remo she went to battle stations for the third time that night as she was made the object of an attack by at least five suicide-manned explosive motor boats. Judicious application of gun-fire, depth charges and violent maneuvering at maximum speed brought her safely through that attack, leaving four of the craft sunk in her wake. The following morning, upon returning to the area she captured the fifth boat intact with two boat operators aboard. Insofar as it is known, that was the first craft of that type captured from the Germans and it provided valuable tactical information to the Allied forces in the area.

In December 1944, Gleaves was assigned as fire support ship near Allied positions on the Franco-Italian frontier, and performed this duty until sailing for the United States in February 1945. After a period of outfitting at New York and training activities in the Caribbean, she departed 30 June 1945 from Guantanamo Bay, Cuba, for the Pacific, arriving at Pearl Harbor 4 August. While completing her training period in Hawaiian waters, the war came to an abrupt end. However, Gleaves proceeded westward with the outbound occupation convoys and participated in the occupation of Nagasaki in September 1945. She was then engaged in convoy work and commended for her outstanding rescue and salvage work following the typhoon which swept through the Philippine Sea on 29 September 1945.

== Post war ==
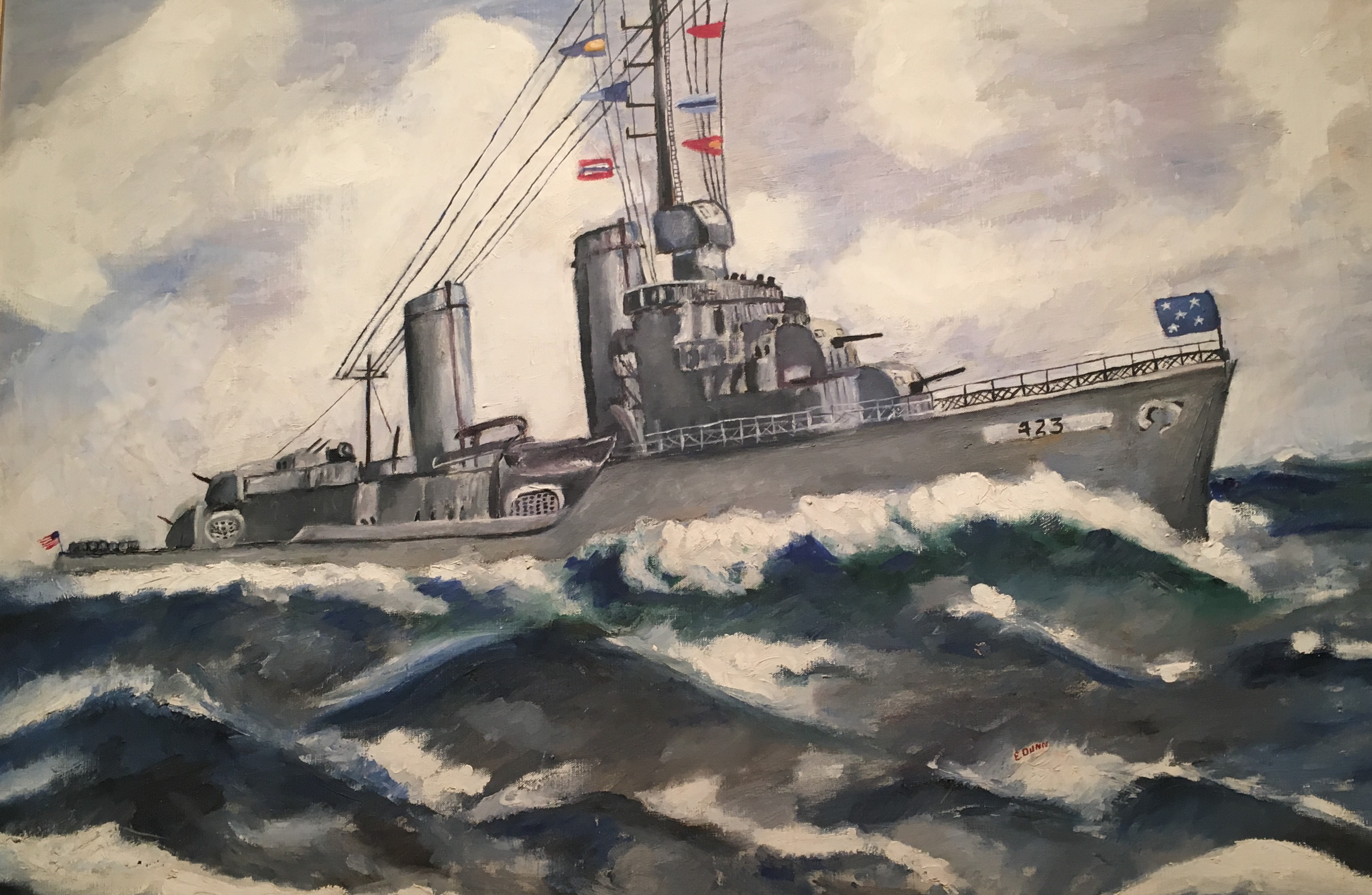
An original oil painting of USS Gleaves

Early in the evening of 23 November SS Adabelle Lykes, en route from Shanghai to San Francisco with 2000 service men and women embarked, discovered a case of smallpox aboard. Her supply of vaccine would not suffice to inoculate all the 2000 men and women aboard. A call for help went out to the naval forces in the area. Four destroyers lay in the harbor at Adak, the nearest base to the position of Adabelle Lykes. One had a mission already assigned, the others were undergoing long deferred repairs. Of these, Gleaves, reported that she could have all vital equipment ready in three hours. At 02:30 on 24 November, she left her berth and sped on her way at 23 knots (43 km/h; 26 mph).

At 13:00 on 25 November, her radar detected Adabelle Lykes and by 14:00 a line was passed between the two ships which were heaving and tossing in the stormy seas. The vaccine and a supply of penicillin for the stricken men went aboard.

Her duty in the North Pacific terminated, Gleaves transported 300 veterans from the Aleutian Islands to Seattle, Washington, on "Magic-Carpet" duty, arriving 10 December 1945. She then moved to San Francisco and on 2 January 1946 departed for Charleston, South Carolina At Charleston, where she arrived 18 January 1946, Gleaves decommissioned 8 May 1946, and was placed in reserve at Philadelphia, Pennsylvania She was later moved to the Reserve Fleet at Orange, Texas, where she remained through 1967. Gleaves was stricken from the naval register on 1 November 1969 and sold 29 June 1972 and broken up for scrap.

== Awards ==
Gleaves received five battle stars on the European-African-Middle Eastern Campaign Medal for participating in the following operations:

1 Star/Sicilian occupation – 9 to 15 July 1943 and 28 July to 17 August 1943

1 Star/Salerno landings – 9 to 21 September 1943

1 Star/west Coast of Italy Operations – 1944 Anzio-Nettuno advanced landings – 22 to 28 January 1944

1 Star/Anti-Submarine assessment – Mediterranean – 14 Many 1944

1 Star/Invasion of Southern France – 15 August to 25 September 1944
