= SS Ragnhild =

Ragnhild was the name of a number of steamships, including:

- SS Ragnhild (1896), torpedoed and sunk by SM UB-30 on 31 August 1917
- SS Ragnhild (1941), in service 1942–46
