= VPB-94 =

Patrol Bombing Squadron 94
- Active: 3 March 1942 – 22 December 1944
- Country: United States of America
- Branch: United States Navy
- Type: squadron
- Role: Maritime patrol
- Engagements: World War II

Aircraft flown
- Patrol: PBY-5A Catalina

VPB-94 was a Patrol Bombing Squadron of the U.S. Navy. The squadron was established as Patrol Squadron 94 (VP-94) on 3 March 1942, redesignated as Patrol Bombing Squadron 94 (VPB-94) on 1 October 1944 and disestablished on 22 December 1944. It operated the PBY-5A Catalina throughout its operational history.

== Operational history ==
- 3 March 1942: VP-94 was established at NAS Norfolk, Virginia, as a seaplane squadron flying the PBY-5A Catalina under the operational control of Eastern Sea Frontier, PatWing-9. The squadron conducted routine training while stationed at Norfolk.
- 18 May 1942 – 14 January 1943: The squadron remained at NAS Norfolk under training until 18 May when orders were received to transfer to NAS Quonset Point, Rhode Island, for patrol duties and coastal convoy protection. Within two weeks the operational demands of the Eastern Sea Frontier resulted in the formation of a six aircraft detachment being deployed to NAS Jacksonville, Florida. This detachment was split into two three-aircraft sections, one remaining at Jacksonville and the other deployed to Charleston, South Carolina on 10 June 1942. A third detachment of two aircraft was formed and deployed to MCAS Cherry Point, North Carolina, on 1 September 1942. The squadron shifted aircraft and crews between the various detachment sites until 14 January 1943, when all of the personnel and aircraft were reunited at NAS Jacksonville in preparation for deployment to Brazil.
- 16 January 1943: VP-94 deployed to NAF Natal, Brazil. Administrative headquarters were established at that site on 20 January 1943, placing the squadron under the operational control of FAW-11. Convoy patrols and Anti-submarine warfare (ASW) searches were conducted along the coastal convoy routes.
- 18 – 24 June 1943: The squadron's reach was extended when a detachment of six aircraft was formed and deployed to NAF Belém, Brazil. A second detachment of three aircraft was sent to Rio de Janeiro, Brazil, on 24 June.
- 9 July 1943: Lieutenant S. Auslander, from the Belém detachment, attacked and sank U-590, in the Atlantic off Trinidad. On the same day, Lieutenant Frank Hare made an attack on another submarine caught on the surface. The U-boat immediately opened fire with its quad-mount anti-aircraft guns, killing Lieutenant Hare and forcing the aircraft to break off the attack.
- 21 July 1943: Lieutenant R. H. Rowland from the Belém detachment attacked and sank U-662, in the Atlantic off Dutch Guiana. Lieutenant Rowland's crew dropped life rafts for the 3 survivors from the attack. The German submariners were later picked up by PC 494 from Task Force 2.
- July 1943: The decision was made to relocate the headquarters of the squadron to Belém, where the majority of the squadron was now located. The move was made on 13 July 1943, leaving a five-aircraft detachment at NAF Natal and seven aircraft at NAF Belém. Over the next eight months, detachments were deployed at various times to Recife, Fernando de Noronha, Sao Luiz and Fortaleza, Brazil; Trinidad and Zandery Field, Dutch Guiana.

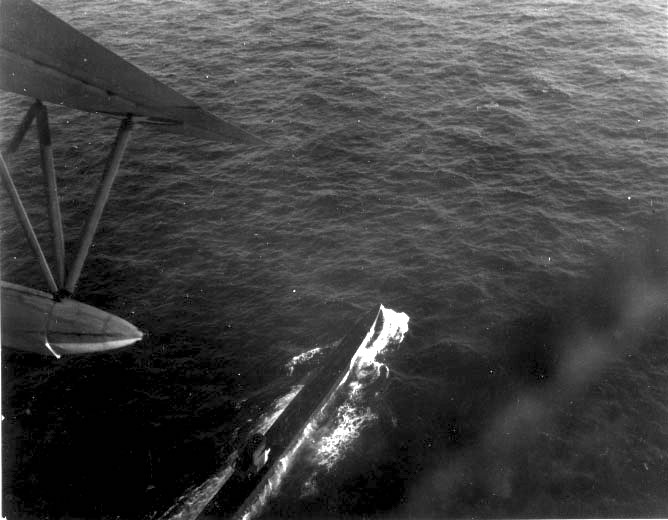
Brazilian PBY-5A assigned to VP-94, over U-199 on 19 July 1943

- 19 July 1943: A Brazilian PBY-5A Catalina flown by a trainee pilot, Cadet A. Tories, assigned to VP-94, sunk U-199 in the Atlantic off Cabo Frio, Brazil. Out of the crew of 60 there were only 11 survivors. The survivors initially were under Brazilian captivity but were later transferred to the U.S.
- 29 April 1944: The headquarters for the squadron was moved for the third time to NAF Maceió, Brazil, then on to Ipitanga, Brazil, on 15 May 1944, placing it under the operational control of FAW-16. Detachments operated from Maceió, Fernando de Noronha, Ipitanga, Caravelas and Santa Cruz until August 1944.
- 10 August 1944: A detachment of five aircraft was formed and transferred to Santa Cruz, Brazil, to initiate the US/Brazilian Aviation Training Unit. VP-94 had previously assisted in the training of Brazilian pilots while at Belém in April 1944. Part of a Brazilian squadron of PBY-5s was located at Belem at the time. VP-94 began a program of training, consisting of practical classes for radiomen and antisubmarine bombing practice for pilots.
- 12 December 1944: The squadron's entire complement of aircraft and supplies was formally presented to the Forca Aerea Brazileira at Galeão Air Force Base, Rio de Janeiro, Brazil. Squadron personnel received orders for their return to NAS Norfolk on 15 December, and VPB-94 was officially disestablished on 22 December 1944.

== Home port assignments ==
The squadron was assigned to these home ports, effective on the dates shown:

- NAS Norfolk, Virginia - 3 March 1942
- NAS Quonset Point, Rhode Island - 18 May 1942
- NAF Natal, Brazil - 20 January 1943
- NAF Belém, Brazil - July 1943
- NAF Maceió, Brazil - 29 April 1944
- Ipitanaga Field, Brazil - 15 May 1944
- NAS Norfolk - 15 Dec 1944

== See also ==
- Maritime patrol aircraft
- List of inactive United States Navy aircraft squadrons
- List of United States Navy aircraft squadrons
- List of squadrons in the Dictionary of American Naval Aviation Squadrons
- History of the United States Navy
