= Johann Mohr =

- Born: 12 June 1916; Hanover, German Empire
- Died: 2 April 1943 (aged 26); U-124, Atlantic Ocean, off Porto, Portugal; Approximately 41°02′N 15°39′W
- Military career
- Allegiance: Nazi Germany
- Branch: Kriegsmarine
- Service years: 1934–1943
- Rank: Korvettenkapitän
- Commands: U-124
- Conflicts: World War II: Battle of the Atlantic
- Awards: Knight's Cross of the Iron Cross with Oak Leaves

Johann Mohr (12 June 1916 – 2 April 1943) was a captain with the Kriegsmarine during World War II. He was a recipient of the Knight's Cross of the Iron Cross with Oak Leaves of Nazi Germany.

Mohr joined the Reichsmarine in 1934. After serving as first Watch Officer (second-in-command) to Georg-Wilhelm Schulz in U-124 on three patrols, in September 1941 he assumed command of the U-boat on six patrols, and sank 27 merchant ships, for a total of 129,292 GRT of Allied shipping.

On 25/26 September 1941 Mohr was part of a Wolfpack that attacked convoy HG 73. Mohr sank Empire Stream, Petrel and Siremalm. Rolf Mützelburg sank the steamer Cortes, for which Mohr has been wrongly credited.

On 24 November and 3 December 1941 Mohr sank the British light cruiser HMS Dunedin and the steamer Sagadahoc. On 14 March 1942 British Resource was sunk by Mohr and his crew. In March Mohr achieved a run of successes; Ceiba and Acme (17 March), Kassandra Louloudis and E.M. Clark (18 March), Papoose and W.E. Hutton (19 March), Esso Nashville and Atlantic Sun (21 March) and finally Naeco on 23 March completed the run. All but three were United States-owned vessels.

He sank four ships from Convoy ON 92 in May 1942; SS Empire Dell, Mount Parnes, Cristales and Llanover. On 9 June the Free French corvette Mimosa was engaged and sunk by U-124, the escort screen prevented Mohr from sinking any ships from Convoy ONS 100. Mohr persisted, and three nights later, on 12 June, he sank the 4,093grt British steamer Dartford. Six days later, Mohr picked up Convoy ONS 102 in the congested Atlantic shipping lanes. He accounted for the American cargo Seattle Spirit, which destroyed 5,627grt. Mohr's last success of the year came on 28 December, when U-124 torpedoed and sank the British ship Treworlas (4,692grt).

On 9 January 1943, Mohr intercepted the United States Navy Convoy TB-1. In a single action Mohr and his crew sank Broad Arrow (7,718grt), Birmingham City (6,194grt), Collingsworth (5,101grt) and the 4,554grt Minotaur; amounting to approximately 24,000 grts.

On 2 April 1943, Mohr sailed U-124 to intercept Convoy OS 45. He succeeded in penetrating the escort screen and sinking Gogra (5,190 grt) and Katha (4,357grt) in position 41°02′N 15°39′W. The escorts were alerted and began hunting the U-boat. Mohr was killed when U-124 was detected, engaged and sunk with all hands about 500 km (270 nmi) west of Porto, Portugal, by the British corvette HMS Stonecrop and the sloop HMS Black Swan.

== Awards ==
- Spanish Cross in Bronze (6 June 1939)
- Memel Medal (26 October 1939)
- Iron Cross (1939) 2nd Class (29 November 1939) & 1st Class (4 May 1941)
- U-boat War Badge (1939) (4 May 1941)
- Knight's Cross of the Iron Cross with Oak Leaves
  - Knight's Cross on 27 March 1942 as Kapitänleutnant and commander of U-124
  - 177th Oak Leaves on 13 January 1943 as Kapitänleutnant and commander of U-124
