= German submarine U-590 =

German World War II submarine

History

Nazi Germany
- Name: U-590
- Ordered: 16 January 1940
- Builder: Blohm & Voss, Hamburg
- Yard number: 566
- Laid down: 31 October 1940
- Launched: 6 August 1941
- Commissioned: 2 October 1941
- Fate: Sunk by a US aircraft on 9 July 1943

General characteristics
- Class & type: Type VIIC submarine
- Displacement: 769 tonnes (757 long tons) surfaced; 871 t (857 long tons) submerged
- Length: 67.10 m (220 ft 2 in) o/a; 50.50 m (165 ft 8 in) pressure hull
- Beam: 6.20 m (20 ft 4 in) o/a; 4.70 m (15 ft 5 in) pressure hull
- Height: 9.60 m (31 ft 6 in)
- Draught: 4.74 m (15 ft 7 in)
- Installed power: 2,800–3,200 PS (2,100–2,400 kW; 2,800–3,200 bhp) (diesels); 750 PS (550 kW; 740 shp) (electric)
- Propulsion: 2 shafts; 2 × diesel engines; 2 × electric motors
- Speed: 17.7 knots (32.8 km/h; 20.4 mph) surfaced; 7.6 knots (14.1 km/h; 8.7 mph) submerged
- Range: 8,500 nmi (15,700 km; 9,800 mi) at 10 knots (19 km/h; 12 mph) surfaced; 80 nmi (150 km; 92 mi) at 4 knots (7.4 km/h; 4.6 mph) submerged
- Test depth: 230 m (750 ft); Crush depth: 250–295 m (820–968 ft)
- Complement: 4 officers, 40–56 enlisted
- Armament: 5 × 53.3 cm (21 in) torpedo tubes (four bow, one stern); 14 × torpedoes or 26 TMA mines; 1 × 8.8 cm (3.46 in) deck gun (220 rounds); 1 x 2 cm (0.79 in) C/30 AA gun

Service record
- Part of: 6th U-boat Flotilla; 2 October 1941 – 9 July 1943
- Identification codes: M 23 773
- Commanders: Kptlt. Heinrich Müller-Edzards; 2 October 1941 – 7 June 1943; Oblt.z.S. Werner Kruer; 8 June – 9 July 1943
- Operations: 5 patrols: 1st patrol: 4 – 17 April 1942; 2nd patrol: 3 May – 25 June 1942; 3rd patrol: 11 August – 24 November 1942; 4th patrol: 31 January – 12 April 1943; 5th patrol: 8 June – 9 July 1943
- Victories: 1 merchant ship sunk (5,228 GRT); 1 merchant ship damaged (5,464 GRT)

German submarine U-590 was a Type VIIC U-boat of Nazi Germany's Kriegsmarine during World War II.

She carried out five patrols, was a member of six wolfpacks, sank one ship of 5,228 GRT and damaged one other of 5,464 GRT.

The boat was sunk by depth charges from a US aircraft on 9 July 1943.

== Design ==
German Type VIIC submarines were preceded by the shorter Type VIIB submarines. U-590 had a displacement of 769 tonnes (757 long tons) when at the surface and 871 tonnes (857 long tons) while submerged. She had a total length of 67.10 m (220 ft 2 in), a pressure hull length of 50.50 m (165 ft 8 in), a beam of 6.20 m (20 ft 4 in), a height of 9.60 m (31 ft 6 in), and a draught of 4.74 m (15 ft 7 in). The submarine was powered by two Germaniawerft F46 four-stroke, six-cylinder supercharged diesel engines producing a total of 2,800 to 3,200 metric horsepower (2,060 to 2,350 kW; 2,760 to 3,160 shp) for use while surfaced, two Brown, Boveri & Cie GG UB 720/8 double-acting electric motors producing a total of 750 metric horsepower (550 kW; 740 shp) for use while submerged. She had two shafts and two 1.23 m (4 ft) propellers. The boat was capable of operating at depths of up to 230 metres (750 ft).

The submarine had a maximum surface speed of 17.7 knots (32.8 km/h; 20.4 mph) and a maximum submerged speed of 7.6 knots (14.1 km/h; 8.7 mph). When submerged, the boat could operate for 80 nautical miles (150 km; 92 mi) at 4 knots (7.4 km/h; 4.6 mph); when surfaced, she could travel 8,500 nautical miles (15,700 km; 9,800 mi) at 10 knots (19 km/h; 12 mph). U-590 was fitted with five 53.3 cm (21 in) torpedo tubes (four fitted at the bow and one at the stern), fourteen torpedoes, one 8.8 cm (3.46 in) SK C/35 naval gun, 220 rounds, and a 2 cm (0.79 in) C/30 anti-aircraft gun. The boat had a complement of between forty-four and sixty.

== Service history ==
The submarine was laid down on 31 October 1940 at Blohm & Voss, Hamburg as yard number 566, launched on 6 August 1941 and commissioned on 2 October under the command of Heinrich Müller-Edzards.

She served with the 6th U-boat Flotilla from 2 October 1941 for training and stayed with that organization for operations from 1 April 1942 until her loss.

=== First and second patrols ===
U-590's first patrol was from Kiel on 4 April 1942. She headed for the Atlantic Ocean via the gap separating the Faroe and Shetland Islands. The boat arrived in St. Nazaire (from where she would be based for the rest of her career), in occupied France on the 17th.

Her second sortie was to mid-Atlantic but was relatively uneventful.

=== Third patrol ===
U-590 left St. Nazaire on 11 August 1942 for what was, at 106 days, her longest patrol. By the 28th she had still not left the Bay of Biscay. The boat headed west on 1 September. She steamed south, so that on 14 September she was off Western Sahara. She reached the most southerly point of the patrol (off Sierra Leone and Liberia), on 9 October. The return journey saw her southeast of the Cape Verde Islands on 1 November. She returned to St. Nazaire without any success on 24 November.

=== Fourth patrol ===
The boat had left St. Nazaire on 31 January 1943, but it was not until 11 March that she encountered and damaged the Jamaica Producer. Although believed sunk, the ship managed to reach port; she was repaired and returned to service in May 1943. This ship survived the war.

Eleven days later (21 March), a crew member broke an arm in mid-Atlantic.

=== Fifth patrol and loss ===
The submarine sank the Pelotaslóide near the mouth of the Amazon in Brazil on 4 July 1943. The ship had been waiting for tugs before entering Salinas.

U-590 was sunk by depth charges, in position 03°22′N 48°38′W, dropped from a US PBY Catalina amphibian from VP-94 on 9 July 1943 near the Amazon Estuary. Forty-five men died with U-590; there were no survivors.

=== Wolfpacks ===
U-590 took part in six wolfpacks, namely:

- Hecht (8 May – 18 June 1942)
- Blücher (14 – 20 August 1942)
- Iltis (6 – 23 September 1942)
- Neuland (8 – 13 March 1943)
- Dränger (14 – 20 March 1943)
- Seewolf (21 – 30 March 1943)

== Summary of raiding history ==
Date	Ship Name	Nationality	Tonnage (GRT)	Fate
11 March 1943	Jamaica Producer	United Kingdom	5,464	Damaged
4 July 1943	Pelotaslóide	Brazil	5,228	Sunk

== Bibliography ==
- Busch, Rainer; Röll, Hans-Joachim (1999). German U-boat commanders of World War II : a biographical dictionary. Translated by Brooks, Geoffrey. London, Annapolis, Md: Greenhill Books, Naval Institute Press. ISBN 1-55750-186-6.
- Busch, Rainer; Röll, Hans-Joachim (1999). Der U-Boot-Krieg, 1939-1945: Deutsche U-Boot-Verluste von September 1939 bis Mai 1945 [German U-boat losses from September 1939 to May 1945] (in German). Vol. IV. Hamburg, Berlin, Bonn: Mittler. ISBN 3-8132-0514-2.
- Gröner, Eric; Jung, Dieter; Maass, Martin (1991). German Warships 1815-1945: U-boats and Mine Warfare Vessels. Vol. 2. Translated by Thomas, Keith; Magowan, Rachel. London: Conway Maritime Press. ISBN 0-85177-593-4.
- Kemp, Paul (1997). U-Boats Destroyed – German Submarine Losses in the World Wars. Arms & Armour. ISBN 1-85409-515-3.
