= Wolfpack =

Wolfpack or wolf pack may refer to:

- Pack (canine), a group of canids that live, feed, and travel together as a family group

== Entertainment ==
=== Music ===
- Wolfpack (DJs), a Belgian DJ and music production duo
- Wolfbrigade, formerly Wolfpack, a Swedish crust punk band
- Wolfpack (EP), a 2013 EP by Hopes Die Last
- "Wolfpack", a demo and song by DYS
- "Wolf Pack", a song by The Vaccines from the album What Did You Expect from The Vaccines?
- "Wolfpack", a song by Syd Barrett from the album Barrett
- "The Wolfpack", a song by Angels & Airwaves from the album The Dream Walker
- "The Wolfpack", a song by Satyricon from the album The Age of Nero
- "Wolfpack", a song by the Swedish metal band Sabaton from the album Primo Victoria

=== Video games ===
- Wolfpack Studios, a video game company based in Austin, Texas
- Wolfpack (video game), a 1990 submarine computer game
- AFO Wolfpack, one of two main AFOs in the 2010 video game Medal of Honor
- An official nickname associated with eSports team Denial eSports

=== Other ===
- The Wolfpack, a 2015 documentary film
- Wolf Pack (TV series), a 2023 American television series from Paramount+
- Wolfpack (wargame), a 1974 board wargame that simulates U-boat warfare during WWII
- Wolfpack, a Battletech novel written by Robert N. Charrette
- Wolfpack (Marvel Comics), a Marvel Comics title during the 1980s
- nWo Wolfpac, a subgroup within the New World Order professional wrestling stable
- Teenage Wolfpack, a 1956 German film released in the UK as Wolfpack

== Military ==
- Wolfpack (naval tactic), a system of submarine warfare used by the Kriegsmarine of Germany and the U.S. Navy during World War II
- Wolfpack (squadron), a U.S. Navy fighter squadron
- 8th Fighter Wing, a U.S. Air Force unit nicknamed "Wolfpack"
- HMH-466, a U.S. Marine Corps helicopter squadron known as the Wolfpack
- 3rd Light Armored Reconnaissance Battalion, a U.S. Marine Corps unit known as "The Wolfpack"
- HSL-45, a U.S. Navy Helicopter Anti-Submarine Squadron known as the Wolfpack; see List of units of the United States Navy

== Sports ==
- Toronto Wolfpack, Canadian professional rugby league team
- Prairie Wolf Pack, Canadian rugby union team
- NC State Wolfpack, the collegiate athletic teams that represent North Carolina State University
- Nevada Wolf Pack, the collegiate athletic teams that represent University of Nevada, Reno
- Loyola Wolf Pack, the collegiate athletic teams that represent Loyola University New Orleans
- Thompson Rivers WolfPack, the collegiate athletic teams that represent Thompson Rivers University in Kamloops, British Columbia
- Wisconsin Wolfpack, an American football franchise based in Wisconsin
- Hartford Wolf Pack (formerly known as the Connecticut Whale), an ice hockey team in the American Hockey League
- Portland Wolfpack, a team in the now-defunct International Fight League and based in Portland, Oregon
- Lillehammer Wolfpack, an American football team based in Lillehammer, Norway
- BMS Herlev Wolfpack, a Danish basketball team
- The Wolf Pack, a nickname for the Finland men's national basketball team
- The Wolfpack, nickname of the Deceuninck–Quick-Step cycling team
- The Wolf Pack, the fanclub of former Philadelphia Phillies pitcher Randy Wolf
- Wolfpack, a former group of devoted fans of the Kansas City Chiefs in the 1960s
- Saint Ignatius Wolfpack, the high school athletic teams that represent Saint Ignatius College Prep High School in Chicago.

== Other uses ==
- Wolfpack, the codename for Microsoft Cluster Server
- La Manada sexual abuse case, Spanish legal case, colloquially known in English as the San Fermin wolf pack case
- Wolf-PAC, American nonpartisan political action committee
