= SS Ragnhild (1941) =

Cargo ship built in 1941

- SS Penelope

History
- Name: Empire Carey (1941–42); Ragnhild (1942–46); Penelope (1946–72); Ingeborg (1972–76)
- Owner: Ministry of War Transport (1941–42); Norwegian Government (1942–46); John Wilson's Rederi A/S (1946–50); Rederi A/B Pandia (1950–55); Lundqvist-Rederierna (1955–72); Bröderna Krusell A/N (1972–76)
- Operator: J & C Harrison (1941–42); Norwegian Shipping & Trade Mission (1942–46); John Wilson & Son (1946–50); Rederi A/B Pandia (1950–55); Angfartygs A/B Alfa (1955–72); Wackatz & Co (1972–74)
- Port of registry: (United Kingdom) West Hartlepool (1941–42); (Norway) Oslo (1942–50); (Finland) Mariehamn (1950–72); (Sweden) Göteborg (1972–76)
- Builder: William Gray & Co. Ltd.
- Yard number: 1125
- Launched: 20 October 1941
- Completed: December 1941
- Out of service: 1974–76
- Identification: Code Letters BCTK (1941–42); Code Letters RNAN (1942–46); Code Letters LLMT (1946–50); United Kingdom Official Number 168931 (1941–42)
- Fate: Scrapped 1976.

General characteristics
- Tonnage: 2,866 GRT (1941–46); 2,833 GRT (1946–76); 1,688 NRT (1941–46); 1,681 NRT (1946–76); 4,670 DWT (1941–46)
- Length: 315 ft 4 in (96.11 m)
- Beam: 46 ft 5 in (14.15 m)
- Depth: 23 ft 0 in (7.01 m) (1941–46); 22 ft 9 in (6.93 m) (1946–76)
- Installed power: Triple expansion steam engine
- Propulsion: Screw propeller
- Speed: 10 knots (19 km/h)
- Armament: 1 x 3" gun, 1 x 4" gun, 5 machine guns (Ragnhild during the Second World War)

Ragnhild was a 2,866 GRT cargo ship which was built in 1941 for the British Ministry of War Transport (MoWT) as Empire Carey. In 1942 she was transferred to the Norwegian Government in exile and renamed Ragnhild. Her war service is very well documented, and serves to illustrate a typical tramp ship's service life during the Second World War.

She was sold out of government service in 1946 and renamed Penelope. She was sold to Finland in 1950 and served until 1972 when she was sold to Sweden, renamed Ingeborg and hulked. Laid up in 1974, she was scrapped in Denmark in 1976.

== Description ==
The ship was built by William Gray & Co. Ltd., West Hartlepool, as yard number 1125. She was launched on 20 October 1941 and completed in December.

The ship was 315 feet 4 inches (96.11 m) long, with a beam of 46 feet 5 inches (14.15 m) and a depth of 23 feet 0 inches (7.01 m). Her GRT was 2,066, with a NRT of 1,688. Her DWT was 4,670.

She was propelled by a triple expansion steam engine, which had cylinders of 20 inches (51 cm), 31 inches (79 cm) and 55 inches (140 cm) diameter and 39 inches (99 cm) stroke. The engine was made by the Central Marine Engine Works, West Hartlepool. The ship could make 10 knots (19 km/h).

== History ==
=== Empire Carey ===
Empire Carey was built for the Ministry of War Transport. She was initially placed under the management of J & C Harrison Ltd. The Official Number 168931 and Code Letters BCTK were allocated and her port of registry was West Hartlepool.

The activities of Empire Carey (and Ragnhild) during the Second World War are unusually well documented. She was to have been a member of Convoy HX 183, which departed Halifax, Nova Scotia on 2 April 1942 and arrived at Liverpool on 15 April, but she joined Convoy SC 78, which departed Halifax on 5 April and arrived at Liverpool on 22 April. Empire Carey was carrying a cargo of flour bound for Glasgow. She was carrying the convoy's Rear Commodore.

=== Ragnhild ===
On 30 April 1942, after just five months in British service, Empire Carey was transferred to the Norwegian Government in exile and renamed Ragnhild. She was placed under the management of the Norwegian Shipping & Trade Mission. Her port of registry was changed to Oslo and the Code Letters LNAN were allocated. In November 1943 Ragnhild is known to have been armed with a 4" gun and five machine guns. This armament was recorded in February 1945 as having been strengthened by the addition of a 3" gun.

==== 1942 ====
Convoy ON 92 departed Liverpool on 6 May and arrived at Halifax on 21 May. Ragnhild departed from the Clyde. On 22 May, Ragnhild joined Convoy HS 4, which departed Halifax bound for Sydney, Nova Scotia, arriving on 23 May. She departed the same day for Montreal, where she arrived on 27 May. On 6 June she departed Montreal for Sydney, from where she joined Convoy SC 87, which departed Sydney on 12 June and arrived at Liverpool on 27 June. Ragnhild was carrying a cargo of flour and general cargo. Ragnhild left the convoy and put into Belfast Lough, from where she joined Convoy BB191, which departed on 26 June and arrived at Milford Haven, Pembrokeshire the next day. She continued on to Swansea, Glamorgan from where she sailed on 29 June, as part of Convoy WP 179, which was bound for Southampton, Hampshire arriving on 1 July.

Ragnhild departed from Southampton on 4 July. She joined Convoy PW 182, which departed Portsmouth, Hampshire on6 July and arrived at Milford Haven on 8 July. Ragnhild arrived at Swansea on 8 July. She departed on 11 July and arrived at Milford Haven on 12 July. She sailed the same day, joining Convoy ON 112, which departed Liverpool on 13 July and arrived at Halifax on 28 July. Ragnhild then joined Convoy HS 40, which departed Halifax on 11 August and arrived at Sydney on 13 August. The next day, Ragnhild sailed for Clarke City, Quebec, arriving on 17 August. On 23 August, Ragnhild sailed from Clark City, joining convoy QS 29, which departed Father Point that day and arrived at Sydney on 26 August. She then joined Convoy SH 38, which departed Sydney on 26 August and arrived at Halifax on 29 August. She then joined Convoy SC 98, which departed Halifax on 29 August and arrived at Liverpool on 13 September. Ragnhild was carrying a cargo of pulp bound for London. Ragnhild put into Loch Ewe on 12 September, sailing on 13 September as part of Convoy WN 336, which arrived at the Methil Roads on 14 September. She then joined Convoy FS 909, which departed the Methil Roads on 16 September and arrived at Southend-on-Sea on 18 September. Ragnhild was bound for Gravesend, Kent where she arrived on 18 September.

On 27 September, Ragnhild departed Gravesend for the Methil Roads, joining Convoy FN 825, which departed Southend-on-Sea, Essex on 28 September and arrived at Methil on 30 September. She joined Convoy EN 144, which sailed from the Methil Roads the same day and arrived at Loch Ewe on 2 October. Ragnhild then joined Convoy ON 135, which departed Liverpool on 2 October for Halifax and New York, arriving on 20 October. She departed New York on 22 October, arriving at Boston on 23 October. Ragnhild sailed from Boston on 4 November for New York, where she arrived on 5 November. She then joined Convoy SC 109, which departed New York on 9 November and arrived at Liverpool on 30 November. Ragnhild was carrying a cargo of lumber and steel. She put into Belfast Lough on 29 November, from where she joined Convoy BB 239, which departed Belfast Lough on 30 November and arrived at Milford Haven, on 1 December. Ragnhild then joined Convoy WP 257, which departed Milford Haven that day and arrived at Portsmouth on 3 December. She sailed from Southampton on 10 December and arrived at Dartmouth, Devon on 13 December. She departed Dartmouth on 14 December and arrived at Plymouth on 14 December. The following day she sailed to Falmouth, Cornwall, arriving the same day. On 18 December, Ragnhild departed Falmouth for Cardiff, Glamorgan, where she arrived on 19 December. She was one of two ships listed in Convoy PW 263, which departed Portsmouth on 14 December and arrived at Milford Haven on 19 December. On 30 December, she departed from Cardiff and anchored in the Barry Roads.

==== 1943 ====
On 1 January 1943, Ragnhild departed from the Barry Roads for Belfast Lough, arriving on 3 January, from where she joined Convoy ON 158, which had departed from Liverpool on 2 January 1943 bound for New York. Ragnhild left the convoy at Halifax, arriving on 23 January. She sailed from Halifax on 31 January, joining Convoy ON 160, which departed Liverpool on 11 January and arrived at New York on 4 February. Ragnhild joined the convoy at 42°53′N 62°35′W. She then joined Convoy NG 342, which departed New York on 7 February and arrived at Guantánamo Bay, Cuba on 14 February. Ragnhild then joined Convoy GAT 44, which departed Guangánamo Bay on 14 February and arrived at Trinidad on 18 February, although Ragnhild actually arrived on 20 February. On 5 March, she sailed for Demerara, Guyana, arriving on 7 March.

Ragnhild departed Demerara on 10 March for Trinidad, arriving on 11 March. She then joined Convoy TAG 48, which departed Trinidad on 15 March and arrived at Guantánamo Bay on 20 March, from where she joined Convoy GN 48, departed Guantámo Bay on 20 March and arrived at New York on 28 March. On 29 March, she sailed from New York for Boston, arriving the next day. On 4 April, Ragnhild sailed from Boston for Halifax, arriving on 6 April. she then joined Convoy SC 126, which departed Halifax on 8 April and arrived at Liverpool on 23 April. Ragnhild was carrying a cargo of bauxite. She put into Belfast Lough on 23 April and sailed the same day for Larne, County Antrim, arriving the same day.

On 1 February, Ragnhild departed Larne and arrived at Liverpool on 2 February, from where she joined Convoy ONS 7, which departed Liverpool on 7 May and arrived at Halifax on 25 May. On 4 June, she departed Halifax for Campbellton, New Brunswick, arriving on 7 June. On 20 June, Ragnhild departed Campbellton for Mulgrave, Nova Scotia and then Sydney, from where she joined Convoy SH 88A, which departed Sydney on 24 June and arrived at Halifax on 25 June. Ragnhild then joined Convoy SC 135, which departed Halifax on 27 June and arrived at Liverpool on 11 July. She was carrying a cargo of lumber. She put into Loch Ewe on 10 July, sailing the next day for the Methil Roads, where she arrived on 13 July. She then joined Convoy FS 1166, which departed the same day for Southend-on-Sea, arriving on 15 July. Ragnhild arrived at Gravesend the same day.

On 23 July, she departed Gravesend, joining convoy FN 1081, which departed Southend-on-Sea on 24 July and arrived at the Methil Roads on 26 July. Ragnhild put into Blyth, Northumberland on 25 July. She arrived on 24 July. She sailed on 1 August, joining Convoy FN 1087, which departed Southend-on-Sea on 31 July and arrived at the Methil Roads on 2 August. She then joined Convoy EN 264, which departed the Methil Roads on 4 August and arrived at Loch Ewe on 6 August. Ragnhild sailed the next day, joining Convoy ONS 15, which departed Liverpool on 6 August and arrived at Halifax on 21 August. She arrived at Sydney on 20 August, departing the following day for Sorel, Quebec and arriving on 24 August. On 29 August she sailed for Rimouski, Quebec, from where she sailed on 11 September for Sydney, joining Convoy QS 68, which departed Red Islet on 10 September and arrived at Halifax on 15 September. On that day, she joined Convoy SC 142, which departed Halifax on 15 September and arrived at Liverpool on 29 September. Ragnhild was carrying a cargo of lumber and steel. She put into Loch Ewe on 29 September. She then joined Convoy WN 486, which departed Loch Ewe that day and arrived at the Methil Roads on 1 October. She departed the Methil Roads the same day and arrived at Gravesend on 3 October.

On 11 October, she departed from Gravesend and anchored off Southend-on-Sea, from where she joined Convoy FN 1148, which departed from Southend-on-Sea on 12 October and arrived at the Methil Roads on 14 October. Ragnhild out into South Shields on 13 October. She departed on 28 October for the Methil Roads, where she joined Convoy EN 300, which departed on 29 October and arrived at Loch Ewe on 31 October. She arrived at Oban on 1 November. Ragnhild departed Oban on 6 November, joining Convoy KMS 32, which had departed with Convoy OS 58 from Liverpool on 5 November and split on 18 November, with OS 58 continuing to Freetown, Sierra Leone and KMS 32 continuing to Gibraltar, arriving on 19 November. Ragnhild was carrying a cargo of coal. She arrived at Bizerte, Tunisia on 23 November. She sailed from Bizerte on 4 December for an unknown destination, arriving back at Bizerte on 18 December. Ragnhild sailed from Bizerte on 23 December bound for Bône, Algeria, as part of Convoy GUS 25, which departed Port Said on 16 December and arrived at the Hampton Roads, Virginia on 17 January 1944.

==== 1944 ====
Ragnhild arrived at Bône on 3 January 1944, departing the next day for Gibraltar, where she joined Convoy GUS 26, which had departed Port Said on 26 December 1943 and arrived at the Hampton Roads on 24 January. Ragnhild arrived at Gibraltar on 7 January. She then joined Convoy MKS36, which departed Port Said, Egypt on 1 January and Gibraltar on 12 January, joining with Convoy SL 145 which had departed from Freetown. The convoys arrived at Liverpool on 12 January. Ragnhild was carrying a cargo of iron ore and ammunition, bound for Barrow-in-Furness, Lancashire. She arrived on 24 January.

On 5 February, Ragnhild departed Barrow-in-Furness for Newport, Monmouthshire, arriving on 6 February. She sailed on 11 February, joining Convoy OS 68, which had departed Liverpool on 12 February with Convoy KMS 42. The convoys split on 23 February, KMS 42 continuing to Freetown. OS 68 arrived at Gibraltar on 25 February. Ragnhild was carrying a cargo of coal, she was bound for Casablanca, Morocco, where she arrived on 25 February. She sailed from Casablanca on 2 March with a cargo of phosphates. She joined Convoy SL 150, which had departed from Freetown on 21 February and joined with Convoy MKS 41. The latter convoy had departed Gibraltar on 2 March. The joint convoys arrived at Liverpool on 14 March.

Ragnhild departed Liverpool on 27 March, and anchored in the River Mersey until 28 March. She then joined Convoy ONS 32, which departed Liverpool on 28 March and arrived at Halifax on 18 April. She put into St John, New Brunswick on 19 April. The next day, she joined Convoy XB 104, which departed Halifax on 16 April and arrived at Boston on 19 April. Ragnhild was bound for Digby, Nova Scotia, where she arrived on 21 April. She sailed from Digby on 1 May and arrived at St John the same day, from where she sailed on 4 May for Halifax arriving the next day and sailing on 6 May for Sydney, from where she sailed on 8 May, Joining Convoy HX 291, which had departed from New York on 10 May and arrived at Liverpool on 27 May. Ragnhild was carrying a cargo of pit props and was bound for Garston, Lancashire, arriving on 27 May. Ragnhild departed Garston on 7 June and arrived at Barry the next day. She departed Barry on 12 June, spending the next six weeks sailing between Barry and Liverpool. She departed Liverpool on 25 August for Newport, arriving on 25 August. She arrived on 27 August. On 9 September, she joined Convoy EBC 98, which departed from Barry and arrived at the Seine Bay, France on 11 September. She returned to Barry in Convoy FBC 92, which departed the Seine Bay on 24 September and arrived at Barry on 26 September. Ragnhild arrived at Cardiff on 27 September.

Ragnhild departed Cardiff on 12 October, arriving at Milford Haven on the next day. She then joined Convoy KMS 66, which departed Liverpool on 15 October with Convoy OS 92. The convoys split at sea on 25 October, with OS 92 dispersing at sea on 4 November. KMS 66 arrived at Gibraltar on 26 October 1944. Ragnhild was bound for Casablanca, where she arrived on 26 October. She departed Casablanca on 28 October, arriving at Gibraltar on 31 October. She then departed for Almería, Spain, arriving the next day and returning to Gibraltar on 2 November, having loaded a cargo of iron ore. Ragnhild then joined Convoy MKS 66G, which departed Gibraltar on 7 November and rendezvoused at sea with Convoy SL 175 the next day. She arrived at Barrow-in-Furness on 16 November.

Ragnhild departed Barrow-in-Furness on 25 November, bound for Glasgow, from where she sailed on 7 December to anchor in the Clyde. She then joined joint Convoys OS 92 / KMS 72, which had departed Liverpool on 13 December and dispersed at 46°40′N 09°12′W on 17 December. Ragnhild was carrying a cargo of coal, and arrived at Lisbon, Portugal on 20 December. She departed Lisbon on 29 December. She arrived at Seville, Spain on 30 December.

==== 1945 ====
Ragnhild departed Seville on 5 January 1945, arriving at Gibraltar the next day. She then joined Convoy MKS 76G which departed Gibraltar on 10 January and arrived at Liverpool on 21 January. She was carrying a cargo of oranges.

Ragnhild departed Liverpool on 13 February, she joined Convoy KMS 85, which departed Liverpool on 17 February and arrived at Gibraltar on 25 February. She was carrying a cargo of coal. Her destination was Malta, where she arrived on 1 March. She departed Malta on 8 March and arrived at La Goulette, Tunisia the following day. She departed La Goulette on 12 March and arrived at Gibraltar on 16 March. Ragnhild then joined Convoy MKS 89G, which departed Gibraltar on 16 March and arrived at Liverpool on 24 March. She was carrying a cargo of iron ore.

She departed Liverpool on 11 April and anchored in the Mersey. She then departed on 12 April as the only member of Convoy KMS 96G. She arrived at Oran on 22 April and departed the same day for Ajaccio, Italy and Sète, France, arriving at Marseille on 26 April. She departed for Sète the next day and arrived back at Marseille on an unrecorded date. Ragnhild departed Marseille on 7 May and arrived at Gibraltar on 11 May, departing the same day for Huelva, Spain, where she arrived on 12 May. She departed Huelva on 16 May and arrived at Gibraltar the same day. She then joined Convoy MKS 102G, which departed Gibraltar on 20 May and arrived at Liverpool on 28 May. She was carrying a cargo of pyrites. Ragnhild left the convoy on or about 27 May, on which date she passed Prawle Point, Devon. She arrived at Hull on 30 May.

Ragnhild departed from Hull on 11 June and arrived at Immingham, Lincolnshire the same day. She departed Immingham on 17 June and arrived at Tunis, Tunisia on 28 June. She departed Tunis on 6 July and arrived at Sfax, Tunisia on 7 July, departing the same day for Algiers, Algeria. She arrived on 9 July and sailed for Gibraltar, arriving there the same day. Ragnhild sailed from Gibraltar on 14 July and arrived at Cardiff on 20 July. She departed from Cardiff on 22 July bound for Haugesund, Norway via the Methil Roads. From Haugesund, she sailed to Bergen, Norway, from where she departed on 10 August for Rudiksvil, Norway, arriving on 16 August. She then sailed to Söderhamn, Sweden, from where she departed on 31 August for Kristiansand, Norway, arriving on 4 September. Ragnhild sailed on 5 September for Amsterdam, Netherlands via the Methil Roads. She arrived at IJmuiden, Netherlands on 9 September.

She is next recorded as arriving at Oslo, Norway on 17 September. Ragnhild arrived at Immingham on 20 September and then sailed to Kiel, from where she sailed on 27 September for Finland. Ragnhild is next recorded as leaving the Tyne on 22 October bound for Kiel, where she arrived on 28 October, sailing the same day for the Tyn, arriving on 31 October. She sailed on 6 November for Grangemouth, Stirlingshire, arriving the next day. Ragnhild sailed from Grangemouth on 12 December, bound for Bizerta. She passed Gibraltar on 26 December.

==== 1946 ====
Ragnhild arrived at Sfax on 4 January 1946. She departed on 9 January, calling at Gibraltar on 14 January and arriving at North Shields, Northumberland on 23 January. She departed the next day bound for Stavanger, Norway. Ragnhild is next recorded as departing from Leith, Mid Lothian on 8 March. She arrived at Bône on 19 March. She is recorded as arriving at Nemours on 25 March, from where she sailed on 31 March for Calais, France, passing Gibraltar on 1 April.

=== Penelope ===
In 1946, Ragnhild was sold to John Wilson's Rederi A/S and was renamed Penelope. Her port of registry was Oslo and the Code Letters LLMT were allocated. Her GRT was now 2,833, with a NRT of 1,681. Her depth was now 3 inches (76 mm) less than it was previously. She was operated under the management of John Wilson & Sons Ltd. In 1950, she was transferred to John Wilson & Hijo, Panama. Later that year, she was sold to Rederi A/B Panda, Mariehamn, Finland. In 1955, she was sold to Lundqvist-Rederierna, Finland. Management passed to Angfartygs A/B Alfa, Mariehamn.

=== Ingeborg ===
On 1 September 1972, Penelope was sold to Bröderna Krusell A/B, Gothenburg, Sweden. Renamed Ingeborg, she was stripped of her engines and converted into a floating grain warehouse for Wackatz & Co, Göteborg. She was laid up in 1974, and sold to shipbreakers at Masnedø, Denmark in 1976.
