= German submarine U-569 =

German World War II submarine

History

Nazi Germany
- Name: U-569
- Ordered: 24 October 1939
- Builder: Blohm & Voss, Hamburg
- Yard number: 545
- Laid down: 21 May 1940
- Launched: 20 March 1941
- Commissioned: 8 May 1941
- Fate: Sunk on 22 May 1943; credited to damage by US aircraft

General characteristics
- Class & type: Type VIIC submarine
- Displacement: 769 tonnes (757 long tons) surfaced; 871 t (857 long tons) submerged
- Length: 67.10 m (220 ft 2 in) o/a; 50.50 m (165 ft 8 in) pressure hull
- Beam: 6.20 m (20 ft 4 in) o/a; 4.70 m (15 ft 5 in) pressure hull
- Height: 9.60 m (31 ft 6 in)
- Draught: 4.74 m (15 ft 7 in)
- Installed power: 2,800–3,200 PS (2,100–2,400 kW; 2,800–3,200 bhp) (diesels); 750 PS (550 kW; 740 shp) (electric)
- Propulsion: 2 shafts; 2 × diesel engines; 2 × electric motors
- Speed: 17.7 knots (32.8 km/h; 20.4 mph) surfaced; 7.6 knots (14.1 km/h; 8.7 mph) submerged
- Range: 8,500 nmi (15,700 km; 9,800 mi) at 10 knots (19 km/h; 12 mph) surfaced; 80 nmi (150 km; 92 mi) at 4 knots (7.4 km/h; 4.6 mph) submerged
- Test depth: 230 m (750 ft); Crush depth: 250–295 m (820–968 ft)
- Complement: 4 officers, 40–56 enlisted
- Armament: 5 × 53.3 cm (21 in) torpedo tubes (four bow, one stern); 14 × torpedoes or 26 TMA mines; 1 × 8.8 cm (3.46 in) deck gun (220 rounds); 1 x 2 cm (0.79 in) C/30 AA gun

Service record
- Part of: 3rd U-boat Flotilla; 8 May 1941 – 22 May 1943
- Identification codes: M 42 293
- Commanders: Kptlt. Hans-Petr Hinsch; 8 May 1941 – 6 February 1943; Oblt.z.S. Hans Johansen; 3 February – 22 May 1943
- Operations: 9 patrols: 1st patrol: 11 August – 21 September 1941; 2nd patrol: 12 October – 12 November 1941; 3rd patrol: 10 – 23 December 1941; 4th patrol: 26 February – 2 April 1942; 5th patrol: 4 May – 28 June 1942; 6th patrol: 4 August – 8 October 1942; 7th patrol: 25 November – 28 December 1942; 8th patrol: 7 February – 13 March 1943; 9th patrol: 19 April – 22 May 1943
- Victories: 1 merchant ship sunk (984 GRT); 1 merchant ship damaged (4,458 GRT)

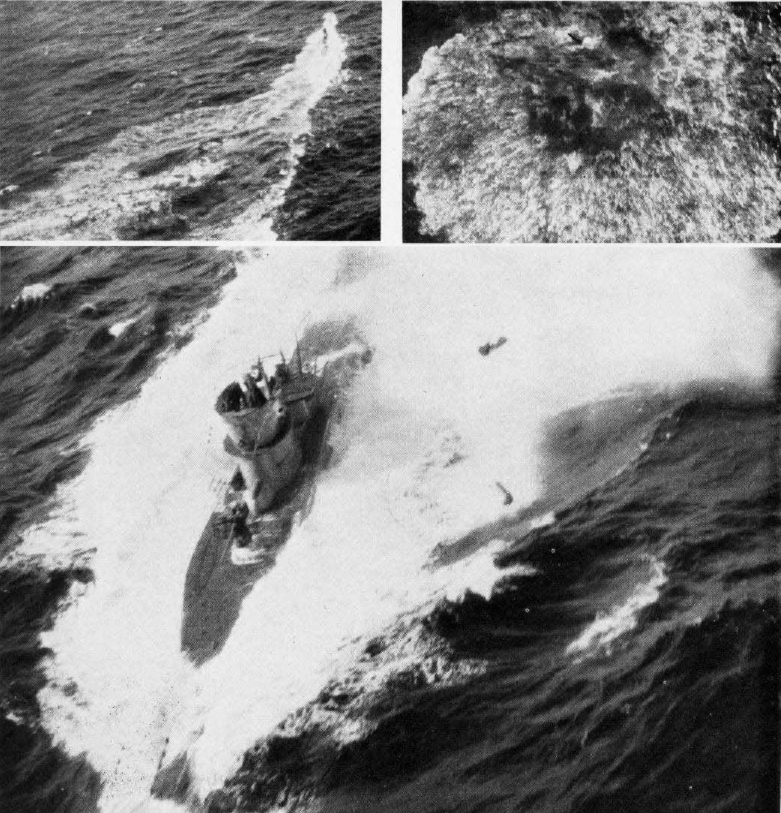
Photos of an attack of two U.S. Navy Grumman TBF Avenger aircraft from the aircraft carrier USS Bogue (CVE-9) on the German Type VIIC submarine U-569 on 22 May 1943

German submarine U-569 was a Type VIIC U-boat of Nazi Germany's Kriegsmarine during World War II.

She carried out nine patrols, sank one ship of 984 gross register tons (GRT) and damaged one other of 4,458 GRT.

She was a member of 15 wolfpacks.

She was attacked by US carrier-borne aircraft from USS Bogue in mid-Atlantic on 22 May 1943 and surrendered, but was scuttled and abandoned when help arrived.

== Design ==
German Type VIIC submarines were preceded by the shorter Type VIIB submarines. U-569 had a displacement of 769 tonnes (757 long tons) when at the surface and 871 tonnes (857 long tons) while submerged. She had a total length of 67.10 m (220 ft 2 in), a pressure hull length of 50.50 m (165 ft 8 in), a beam of 6.20 m (20 ft 4 in), a height of 9.60 m (31 ft 6 in), and a draught of 4.74 m (15 ft 7 in). The submarine was powered by two Germaniawerft F46 four-stroke, six-cylinder supercharged diesel engines producing a total of 2,800 to 3,200 metric horsepower (2,060 to 2,350 kW; 2,760 to 3,160 shp) for use while surfaced, two Brown, Boveri & Cie GG UB 720/8 double-acting electric motors producing a total of 750 metric horsepower (550 kW; 740 shp) for use while submerged. She had two shafts and two 1.23 m (4 ft) propellers. The boat was capable of operating at depths of up to 230 metres (750 ft).

The submarine had a maximum surface speed of 17.7 knots (32.8 km/h; 20.4 mph) and a maximum submerged speed of 7.6 knots (14.1 km/h; 8.7 mph). When submerged, the boat could operate for 80 nautical miles (150 km; 92 mi) at 4 knots (7.4 km/h; 4.6 mph); when surfaced, she could travel 8,500 nautical miles (15,700 km; 9,800 mi) at 10 knots (19 km/h; 12 mph). U-569 was fitted with five 53.3 cm (21 in) torpedo tubes (four fitted at the bow and one at the stern), fourteen torpedoes, one 8.8 cm (3.46 in) SK C/35 naval gun, 220 rounds, and a 2 cm (0.79 in) C/30 anti-aircraft gun. The boat had a complement of between forty-four and sixty.

== Service history ==
The submarine was laid down on 21 May 1940 at Blohm & Voss, Hamburg as yard number 545, launched on 20 March 1941 and commissioned on 8 May under the command of Kapitänleutnant Hans-Peter Hinsch.

She served with the 3rd U-boat Flotilla from 1 August 1941 for training and stayed with that organization for operations until her loss from 1 August 1941 to 22 May 1943.

=== First and second patrols ===
U-569's first patrol was from Trondheim in Norway, she headed for the Atlantic Ocean via the gap separating Iceland and the Faroe Islands. She arrived at St. Nazaire in occupied France, on 21 September 1941.

Having left St. Nazaire on 12 October 1941, U-569 made for the Newfoundland and Labrador coast. She returned to her French base on 12 November.

=== Third patrol ===
The submarine was attacked by a Fairey Swordfish west of Gibraltar on 16 December 1941. She, along with four other U-boats, was to have operated in the Mediterranean, but the damage was such that she had to return to St. Nazaire.

=== Fourth and fifth patrols ===
U-569 sank the Hengist on 8 March 1942 northwest of Cape Wrath (Scotland) and returned to France (La Pallice), on 2 April 1942.

On her fifth sortie, she damaged the Pontypridd northeast of St. John's, Newfoundland, on 11 June 1942 and took the master prisoner. She returned to La Pallice on the 28th.

=== Sixth and seventh patrols ===
The boat was attacked by the Norwegian corvette HNoMS Potentilla on 25 August 1942. The warship lost the element of surprise and her intention to ram when her 4 in gun opened fire prematurely. Several hits were scored on the conning tower by 20mm AA guns, but the larger weapon failed to register in the encounter in mid-Atlantic.

The boat's seventh patrol was relatively peaceful with no contacts.

=== Eighth patrol ===
U-569 was attacked by the escorts of Convoy UC-1 on 23 February 1943 and seriously damaged. She had departed La Pallice on 7 February 1943 and returned there on 13 March.

=== Ninth patrol and loss ===
The boat was badly damaged by depth charges dropped by a TBM Avenger, piloted by William F. Chamberlain, from the escort carrier USS Bogue on 22 May 1943. A relief Avenger also from USS Bogue, piloted by Howard S. Roberts, was waiting overhead when the U-boat resurfaced. Roberts dropped more depth charges and machine-gunned the bridge to prevent the German crew from manning the antiaircraft guns. U-boat Commander Johannsen had no intention of fighting back and, according to American records ordered his crew to raise a white flag on the periscope. Upon seeing this, Roberts ceased his attack and guided the Canadian destroyer St. Laurent to the area. As the destroyer approached, Johannsen ordered his crew to scuttle the boat and jump overboard. St. Laurent rescued Johannsen and 24 of his crew of 46 and the survivors were sent to Washington for interrogation.

=== Wolfpacks ===
U-569 took part in 15 wolfpacks, namely:

- Grönland (14 – 27 August 1941)
- Markgraf (27 August – 16 September 1941)
- Schlagetot (20 October – 1 November 1941)
- Raubritter (1 – 8 November 1941)
- Westwall (2 – 12 March 1942)
- York (12 – 26 March 1942)
- Hecht (8 May – 18 June 1942)
- Lohs (11 August – 21 September 1942)
- Draufgänger (1 – 11 December 1942)
- Ungestüm (11 – 22 December 1942)
- Robbe (16 – 26 February 1943)
- Amsel 3 (3 – 6 May 1943)
- Rhein (7 – 10 May 1943)
- Elbe 1 (10 – 14 May 1943)
- Mosel (19 – 22 May 1943)

== Summary of raiding history ==
Date	Ship Name	Nationality	Tonnage (GRT)	Fate
8 March 1942	Hengist	United Kingdom	984	Sunk
11 June 1942	Pontypridd	United Kingdom	4,458	Damaged

== Bibliography ==
- Busch, Rainer; Röll, Hans-Joachim (1999). German U-boat commanders of World War II : a biographical dictionary. Translated by Brooks, Geoffrey. London, Annapolis, Md: Greenhill Books, Naval Institute Press. ISBN 1-55750-186-6.
- Busch, Rainer; Röll, Hans-Joachim (1999). Der U-Boot-Krieg, 1939-1945: Deutsche U-Boot-Verluste von September 1939 bis Mai 1945 [German U-boat losses from September 1939 to May 1945] (in German). Vol. IV. Hamburg, Berlin, Bonn: Mittler. ISBN 3-8132-0514-2.
- Gröner, Eric; Jung, Dieter; Maass, Martin (1991). German Warships 1815-1945: U-boats and Mine Warfare Vessels. Vol. 2. Translated by Thomas, Keith; Magowan, Rachel. London: Conway Maritime Press. ISBN 0-85177-593-4.
- Kemp, Paul (1997). U-Boats Destroyed – German Submarine Losses in the World Wars. Arms & Armour. ISBN 1-85409-515-3.
- Neistle, Axel (1998). German U-Boat Losses during World War II. Greenhill. ISBN 1-85367-352-8.
