= HMCS Bittersweet =

Flower-class corvette

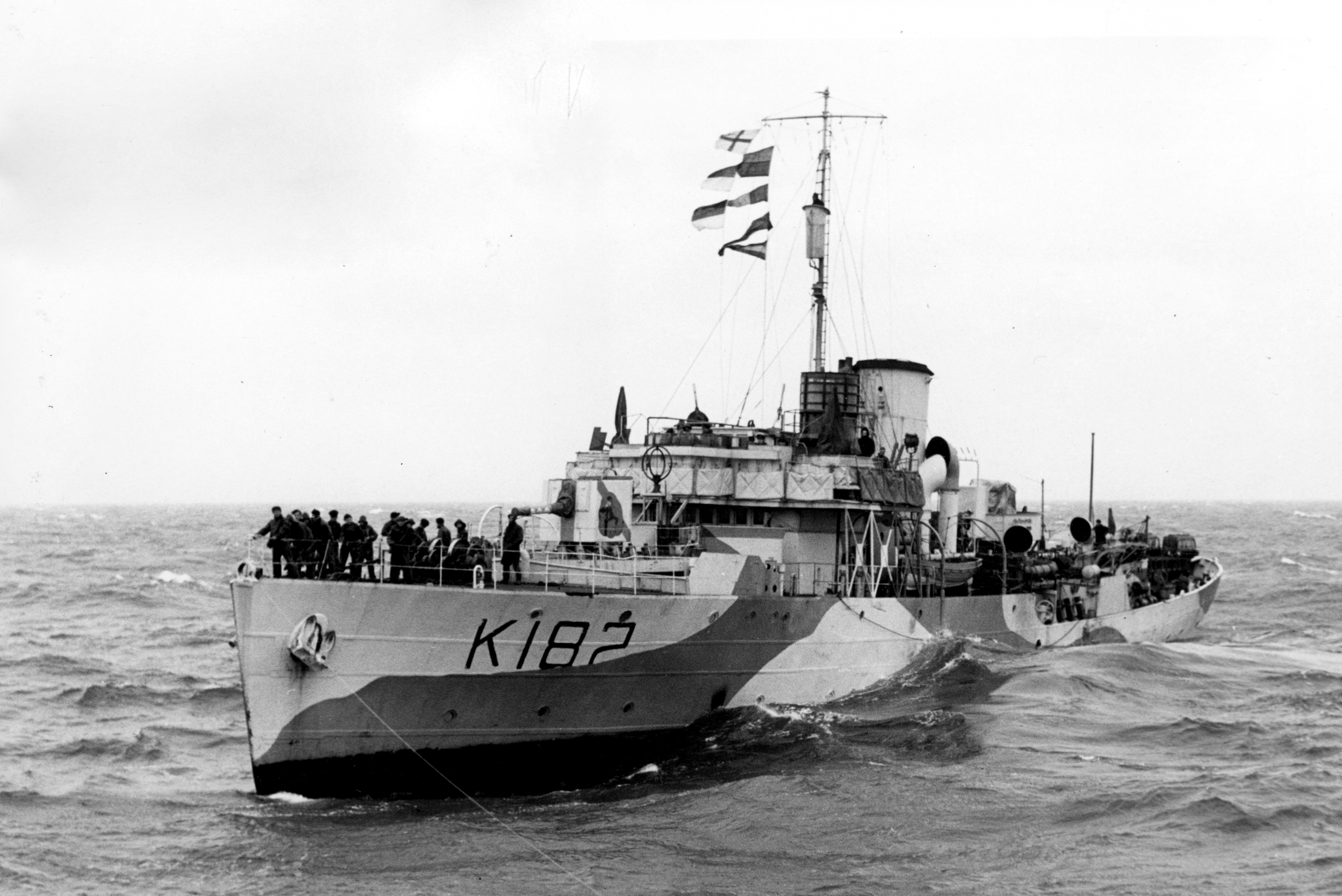
- HMCS Bittersweet about to be taken in tow by HMCS Skeena, May 1943.

History

United Kingdom
- Name: Bittersweet
- Namesake: Flowering vine Solanum dulcamara
- Operator: Royal Navy
- Ordered: 22 January 1940
- Builder: Marine Industries Ltd., Sorel
- Laid down: 17 April 1940
- Launched: 12 September 1940
- Identification: Pennant number: K182
- Fate: Loaned to Canada 1941; Returned on 22 June 1945; scrapped November 1950.

Canada
- Name: Bittersweet
- Operator: Royal Canadian Navy
- Acquired: loaned from Royal Navy
- Commissioned: 23 January 1941
- Decommissioned: 22 June 1945
- Identification: Pennant number: K182
- Fate: Returned to Royal Navy

General characteristics
- Class & type: Flower-class corvette (original)
- Displacement: 950 long tons (970 t)
- Length: 205 ft 1 in (62.51 m) o/a
- Beam: 33 ft 1 in (10.08 m)
- Draught: 13 ft 5 in (4.09 m)
- Propulsion: single shaft; 2 × Scotch boilers; 1 × 4-cylinder triple-expansion reciprocating steam engine; 2,750 ihp (2,050 kW)
- Speed: 16 knots (30 km/h; 18 mph)
- Range: 3,450 nmi (6,390 km; 3,970 mi) at 12 kn (22 km/h; 14 mph)
- Complement: 47
- Sensors & processing systems: 1 × SW1C or 2C radar; 1 × Type 123A or Type 127DV sonar
- Armament: 1 × BL 4-inch (101.6 mm) Mk.IX single gun; 2 × .50 cal machine gun (twin); 2 × Lewis .303 cal machine gun (twin); 2 × Mk.II depth charge throwers; 2 × depth charge rails with 40 depth charges; originally fitted with minesweeping gear, later removed

HMCS Bittersweet was a Flower-class corvette that served with the Royal Canadian Navy during the Second World War. Ordered by the Royal Navy at the beginning of the war, the ship was transferred to the Royal Canadian Navy who had an excess of personnel and not enough ships. Laid down and Launched in 1940, the corvette fought as an ocean convoy escort in the Battle of the Atlantic. The vessel was named for the flowering vine solanum dulcamara. Since the vessel was owned by the British, it kept its flower name. Following the war, Bittersweet was returned to the Royal Navy and was broken up for scrap in 1950.

== Design and description ==
Flower-class corvettes like Bittersweet serving with the Royal Canadian Navy during the Second World War were different from earlier and more traditional sail-driven corvettes. The Flower-class corvettes originated from a need that arose in 1938 to expand the Royal Navy following the Munich Crisis. A design request went out for a small escort for coastal convoys. Based on a traditional whaler-type design, the initial Canadian ships of the Flower class had a standard displacement of 950 long tons (970 t). They were 205 feet 1 inch (62.51 m) long overall with a beam of 33 feet 1 inch (10.08 m) and a maximum draught of 13 feet 5 inches (4.09 m). The initial 1939–1940 corvettes were powered by a four-cylinder vertical triple expansion engine powered by steam from two Scotch boilers turning one three-bladed propeller rated at 2,800 indicated horsepower (2,100 kW). The Scotch boilers were replaced with water-tube boilers in later 1939–1940 and 1940–1941 Programme ships. The corvettes had a maximum speed of 16 knots (30 km/h; 18 mph). This gave them a range of 3,450 nautical miles (6,390 km; 3,970 mi) at 12 knots (22 km/h; 14 mph). The vessels were extremely wet.

The Canadian Flower-class vessels were initially armed with a Mk IX BL 4-inch (102 mm) gun forward on a CP 1 mounting and carried 100 rounds per gun. The corvettes were also armed with a QF Vickers 2-pounder (40 mm, 1.6 in) gun on a bandstand aft, two single-mounted .303 Vickers machine guns or Browning 0.5-calibre machine guns for anti-aircraft defence and two twin-mounted .303 Lewis machine guns, usually sited on bridge wings. For anti-submarine warfare, they mounted two depth charge throwers and initially carried 25 depth charges. The corvettes were designed with a Type 123 ASDIC sonar set installed. The Flower-class ships had a complement of 47 officers and ratings. The Royal Canadian Navy initially ordered 54 corvettes in 1940 and these were fitted with Mark II Oropesa minesweeping gear used for destroying contact mines. Part of the depth charge rails were made portable so the minesweeping gear could be utilised.

=== Modifications ===
In Canadian service the vessels were altered due to experience with the design's deficiencies. The galley was moved further back in the ship and the mess and sleeping quarters combined. A direction-finding set was installed and enlarged bilge keels were installed to reduce rolling. After the first 35–40 corvettes had been constructed, the foremast was shifted aft of the bridge and the mainmast was eliminated. Corvettes were first fitted with basic SW-1 and SW-2 CQ surface warning radar, notable for their fishbone-like antenna and reputation for failure in poor weather or in the dark. The compass house was moved further aft and the open-type bridge was situated in front of it. The ASDIC hut was moved in front and to a lower position on the bridge. The improved Type 271 radar was placed aft, with some units receiving Type 291 radar for air search. The minesweeping gear, a feature of the first 54 corvettes, was removed. Most Canadian Flower-class corvettes had their forecastles extended which improved crew accommodation and seakeeping. Furthermore, the sheer and flare of the bow was increased, which led to an enlarged bridge. This allowed for the installation of Oerlikon 20 mm (0.8 in) cannon, replacing the Browning and Vickers machine guns. Some of the corvettes were rearmed with Hedgehog anti-submarine mortars. The complements of the ships grew throughout the war rising from the initial 47 to as many as 104.

== Construction and career ==
At the opening of the Second World War, the Canadian shipbuilding industry was incapable of building large, sophisticated warships. However, Canada required new large, advanced escort ships for national defence and sought to acquire Tribal-class destroyers for the Royal Canadian Navy. In a deal with the Royal Navy, Canada would construct ten Flower-class corvettes in exchange for two Tribal-class destroyers. The vessel was ordered in January 1940 under the 1939–40 Flower class programme by the Royal Navy from Marine Industries Ltd. in Sorel, Quebec. Bittersweet was laid down on 17 April 1940 and launched on 12 September 1940. As the ship was ordered by the British, the ship kept its flower name Bittersweet, the common name of the flowering vine solanum dulcamara. To prevent being icebound by the freeze-up of the St. Lawrence River, the incomplete Bittersweet was towed to Liverpool, Nova Scotia to finish construction.

There were delays in the arrival of essential equipment for the British corvettes in Canada and some of them sailed without their main armament as they departed from Canadian dockyards as soon as they were fit for the Atlantic crossing. Due to a lack of ships and a surplus of manpower, the Royal Canadian Navy offered to crew the ships until mid-1941 when enough of the Canadian corvettes would become available. Under this agreement, Bittersweet was commissioned directly into the Royal Canadian Navy on 23 January 1941 at Halifax, Nova Scotia. Then in April 1941, the British Admiralty requested that Canada take over the ships permanently. Bittersweet departed Halifax on 5 March as part of HX 113 to undergo more construction at yards on the River Tyne from 1 April to 6 June. After completion, the corvette worked up at Tobermory and departed for Newfoundland via Iceland on 27 June.

Bittersweet was assigned to the Newfoundland Escort Force (NEF) upon arrival. In September 1941, Bittersweet was assigned to Escort Group (EG) 22. EG 22 was escorting convoy HX 148 in September and were forced to make a large detour to avoid the German U-boat wolfpack "Markgraf". She served as an ocean escort until December of that year. Beginning on 31 December, the corvette underwent its forecastle extension at Charleston, South Carolina, keeping the ship out of service until March 1942.

In February 1942, the United States Navy began a withdrawal from escorting convoys and the remaining escorts were re-organized, with Bittersweet joining the EG A3 of the new Mid-Ocean Escort Force. On 11 May EG A3 and the convoy they were escorting, ONS 93, was sighted by the U-boat wolfpack "Hecht". In the ensuing battle during the night of 11/12 May, the convoy lost seven ships comprising 36,284 GRT. The convoy suffered further attacks but no losses over the following days until contact was lost in bad weather. On 15 August 1942, A3 was escorting convoy SC 95 when it was spotted by the wolfpack "Lohs". In the following attacks, the convoy lost two ships. The following month, on 18 September, A3's convoy, SC 100, came under attack again by the wolfpack "Lohs". However, the convoy escapes only to find a new wolfpack, "Pfeil" was established along their route. The Germans kept contact sporadically with the convoy until 25 September. The convoy lost five ships, but spared greater losses due to the severe weather.

The corvette was reassigned to EG C3 in January 1943. C3 and their convoy, ONS 163 are redirected around wolfpacks in February. However, in March, C3 and their convoy HX 229 are intercepted by the wolfpack "Raubgraf" and lose two ships. C3 then escorts three more convoys without issue, evading the wolfpacks placed in their paths. Bittersweet left the group in October 1943 to undergo another refit, this time at Baltimore, Maryland which lasted until November. The corvette then sailed to Pictou, Nova Scotia to work up. Bittersweet then returned to convoy escort duties, sailing from Londonderry in October 1944 with convoy ON 262. That was to the last convoy the corvette sailed with. Upon arrival in Canada, Bittersweet went to Pictou for another refit.

Bittersweet resumed duties her duties briefly with Halifax Force before transferring to Sydney Force. She remained with Sydney Force for the remainder of the war. Bittersweet was returned to the Royal Navy on 22 June 1945 at Aberdeen, Scotland. She was broken up at Charlestown, Fife in 1950. For service in the Battle of the Atlantic, Bittersweet was awarded the battle honour "Atlantic 1941–45".

=== Trans-Atlantic convoys escorted ===
Convoy	Escort Group	Dates	Notes
HX 140		22 July–2 August 1941	Newfoundland to Iceland
ON 4		11–18 August 1941	Iceland to Newfoundland
HX 148		7–10 September 1941	Newfoundland to Iceland
SC 45		21–30 September 1941	Newfoundland to Iceland
ON 21		5–11 October 1941	Iceland to Newfoundland
SC 50		19–31 October 1941	Newfoundland to Iceland
ON 32		6–14 November 1941	Iceland to Newfoundland
SC 56		24 November–6 December 1941	Newfoundland to Iceland
HX 178		3–6 March 1942	Newfoundland to Northern Ireland
ON 79		24 March–3 April 1942	Northern Ireland to Newfoundland
HX 185	MOEF group A3	18–26 April 1942	Newfoundland to Northern Ireland
ON 92	MOEF group A3	7–18 May 1942	Northern Ireland to Newfoundland
SC 85	MOEF group C4	31 May–2 June 1942	Newfoundland to Northern Ireland
ON 102	MOEF group A3	21–25 June 1942	Northern Ireland to Newfoundland
HX 196	MOEF group A3	2–10 July 1942	Newfoundland to Northern Ireland
ON 114	MOEF group A3	20–30 July 1942	Northern Ireland to Newfoundland
SC 95	MOEF group A3	8–18 August 1942	Newfoundland to Northern Ireland
ON 125	MOEF group A3	29 August–7 September 1942	Northern Ireland to Newfoundland
SC 100	MOEF group A3	16–28 September 1942	Newfoundland to Northern Ireland
ON 135	MOEF group A3	3–15 October 1942	Northern Ireland to Newfoundland
HX 212	MOEF group A3	5–14 January 1943	Newfoundland to Northern Ireland
ON 163	MOEF group C3	25 January–6 February 1943	Northern Ireland to Newfoundland
HX 226	MOEF group C3	14–23 February 1943	Newfoundland to Northern Ireland
ON 172	MOEF group C3	10–21 March 1943	Northern Ireland to Newfoundland
SC 124	MOEF group C3	28 March–8 April 1943	Newfoundland to Northern Ireland
ON 180	MOEF group C3	25 April–7 May 1943	Northern Ireland to Newfoundland
HX 238	MOEF group C3	13–21 May 1943	Newfoundland to Northern Ireland
ON 187		2–10 June 1943	Northern Ireland to Newfoundland
HX 244		20–29 June 1943	Newfoundland to Northern Ireland
ON 192		10–18 July 1943	Northern Ireland to Newfoundland
HX 249		29 July–5 August 1943	Newfoundland to Northern Ireland
ONS 16		21–29 August 1943	Northern Ireland to Newfoundland
SC 150		3–14 January 1944	Newfoundland to Northern Ireland
ONS 32		22 January–11 February 1944	Northern Ireland to Newfoundland
HX 279		17–28 February 1944	Newfoundland to Northern Ireland
ON 227		9–17 March 1944	Northern Ireland to Newfoundland
HX 284		26 March–5 April 1944	Newfoundland to Northern Ireland
ON 232		14–23 April 1944	Northern Ireland to Newfoundland
HX 289		3–13 May 1944	Newfoundland to Northern Ireland
ON 237		20–29 May 1944	Northern Ireland to Newfoundland
HX 294		9–19 June 1944	Newfoundland to Northern Ireland
ON 242		25 June–5 July 1944	Northern Ireland to Newfoundland
HX 299		16–23 July 1944	Newfoundland to Northern Ireland
ON 247		3–10 August 1944	Northern Ireland to Newfoundland
HX 304		23 August–1 September 1944	Newfoundland to Northern Ireland
ON 253		14–25 September 1944	Northern Ireland to Newfoundland
HX 311		3–12 October 1944	Newfoundland to Northern Ireland
ON 262		26 October–7 November 1944	Northern Ireland to Newfoundland
ON 298	WLEF	3–5 May 1945	Newfoundland to Halifax
ON 299	WLEF	9–10 May 1945	Newfoundland to Halifax
ON 300	WLEF	14–15 May 1945	Newfoundland to Halifax
