= HMCS Shediac =

Flower-class corvette

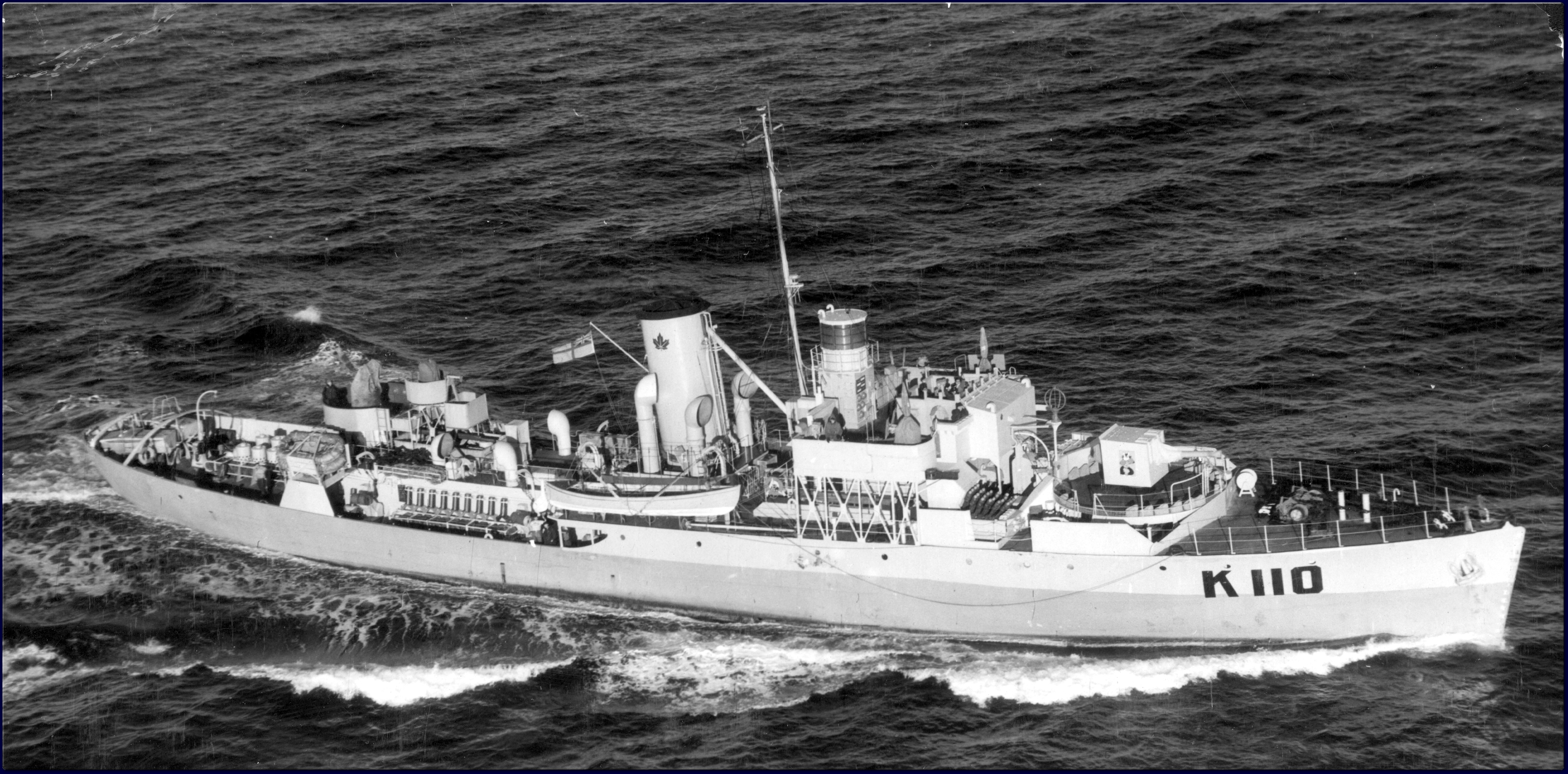
- HMCS Shediac, 16 December 1944

History

Canada
- Name: Shediac
- Namesake: Shediac, New Brunswick
- Ordered: 22 January 1940
- Builder: Davie Shipbuilding, Lauzon
- Laid down: 5 October 1940
- Launched: 29 April 1941
- Commissioned: 8 July 1941
- Decommissioned: 28 August 1945
- Identification: Pennant number: K110
- Honours and awards: Atlantic 1941-44
- Fate: Sold for civilian use in 1954 and scrapped in 1966.

General characteristics
- Class & type: Flower-class corvette (original)
- Displacement: 925 long tons (940 t; 1,036 short tons)
- Length: 205 ft (62.48 m)o/a
- Beam: 33 ft (10.06 m)
- Draught: 11.5 ft (3.51 m)
- Propulsion: single shaft; 2 × fire tube Scotch boilers; 1 × 4-cycle triple-expansion reciprocating steam engine; 2,750 ihp (2,050 kW)
- Speed: 16 knots (29.6 km/h)
- Range: 3,500 nautical miles (6,482 km) at 12 knots (22.2 km/h)
- Complement: 85
- Sensors & processing systems: 1 × SW1C or 2C radar; 1 × Type 123A or Type 127DV sonar
- Armament: 1 × BL 4 in (102 mm) Mk.IX single gun; 2 × .50 cal machine gun (twin); 2 × Lewis .303 cal machine gun (twin); 2 × Mk.II depth charge throwers; 2 × depth charge rails with 40 depth charges; originally fitted with minesweeping gear, later removed

HMCS Shediac was a Flower-class corvette of the Royal Canadian Navy during the Second World War. She served primarily in the Battle of the Atlantic as a convoy escort. She was named after the town of Shediac, New Brunswick.

== Background ==
Flower-class corvettes like Shediac serving with the Royal Canadian Navy during the Second World War were different from earlier and more traditional sail-driven corvettes. The "corvette" designation was created by the French for classes of small warships; the Royal Navy borrowed the term for a period but discontinued its use in 1877. During the hurried preparations for war in the late 1930s, Winston Churchill reactivated the corvette class, needing a name for smaller ships used in an escort capacity, in this case based on a whaling ship design. The generic name "flower" was used to designate the class of these ships, which – in the Royal Navy – were named after flowering plants.

Corvettes commissioned by the Royal Canadian Navy during the Second World War were named after communities for the most part, to better represent the people who took part in building them. This idea was put forth by Admiral Percy W. Nelles. Sponsors were commonly associated with the community for which the ship was named. Royal Navy corvettes were designed as open sea escorts, while Canadian corvettes were developed for coastal auxiliary roles which was exemplified by their minesweeping gear. Eventually the Canadian corvettes would be modified to allow them to perform better on the open seas.

== Construction ==
Shediac was ordered 22 January 1940 as part of the 1939-1940 Flower-class building program. She was laid down by Davie Shipbuilding & Repairing Co. Ltd. at Lauzon, Quebec on 5 October 1940 and launched on 29 April 1941. She was commissioned on 8 July 1941 at Quebec City.

During her career, Shediac two significant refits. The first took place from April to July 1943 at Liverpool, Nova Scotia. Her second major overhaul began in mid-June 1944 and lasted until mid-August, taking place at Vancouver, British Columbia. During this second refit, Shediac had her fo'c'sle extended.

== War duty ==
After arriving at Halifax for deployment, Shediac was briefly assigned to Halifax Force. In October 1941, she joined Newfoundland Command, escorting convoys between St. John's and Iceland. Shediac participated in the battles for convoy SC 48, convoy SC 67 and convoy ON 92 before assignment to Mid-Ocean Escort Force (MOEF) group C1. Beginning in July 1942 Shediac was assigned to the Western Local Escort Force (WLEF). She returned to MOEF in October 1942.

With group C1, she participated in the battles for convoy ON 154 and convoy HX 222, and shared credit with HMCS St. Croix for destruction of U-87 during the battle for convoy KMS 10G. After returning from her first major refit, Shediac rejoined WLEF as a member of escort group W-8. She remained with this group until she transferred to the Pacific coast.

Shediac arrived at Esquimalt, British Columbia 10 May 1944. She departed for refit in June. She remained with the Pacific Fleet until the end of the war.

=== Trans-Atlantic convoys escorted ===
Convoy	Escort group	Dates	Notes
SC 48		5–17 October 1941	Newfoundland to Iceland; 9 ships torpedoed & sunk
ON 27		23 October-2 November 1941	61 ships escorted without loss from Iceland to Newfoundland
SC 54		12–22 November 1941	70 ships escorted without loss from Newfoundland to Iceland
ON 40		30 November-4 December 1941	28 ships escorted without loss from Iceland to Newfoundland
SC 60		18–27 December 1941	22 ships escorted without loss from Newfoundland to Iceland
ON 52		5–11 January 1942	42 ships escorted without loss from Iceland to Newfoundland
SC 67		2–11 February 1942	Newfoundland to Iceland; 1 ship torpedoed & sunk
ON 66		18–25 February 1942	19 ships escorted without loss from Iceland to Newfoundland
HX 178		6–17 March 1942	22 ships escorted without loss from Newfoundland to Northern Ireland
ON 79		24 March-3 April 1942	29 ships escorted without loss from Northern Ireland to Newfoundland
HX 185		18–26 April 1942	33 ships escorted without loss from Newfoundland to Northern Ireland
ON 92		7–16 May 1942	Northern Ireland to Newfoundland; 7 ships torpedoed & sunk
ON 143	MOEF group C1	2–11 November 1942	26 ships escorted without loss from Northern Ireland to Newfoundland
SC 110	MOEF group C1	24 November-5 December 1942	33 ships escorted without loss from Halifax to Newfoundland
ON 154	MOEF group C1	19–30 December 1942	Northern Ireland to Newfoundland; 14 ships torpedoed (13 sunk)
HX 222	MOEF group C1	11–22 January 1943	Newfoundland to Northern Ireland; 1 ship torpedoed & sunk
KMS 10G	MOEF group C1	28 February-8 March 1943	Liverpool to Mediterranean Sea; 4 ships torpedoed (1 sunk)
MKS 9	MOEF group C1	8–18 March 1943	55 ships escorted without loss from Mediterranean to Liverpool
ONS 2	MOEF group C1	29 March-14 April 1943	31 ships escorted without loss from Northern Ireland to Newfoundland

== Post-war service ==
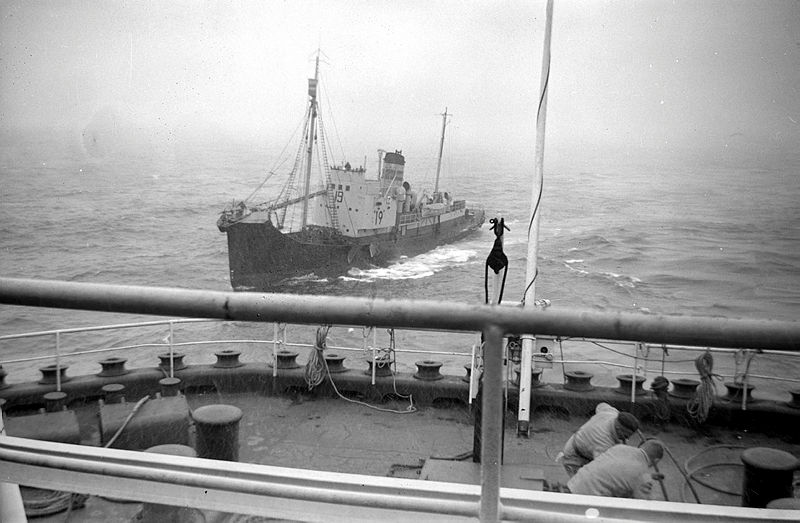
Whale catcher Jooske W. Vinke

Shediac was paid off at Esquimalt 28 August 1945 after the end of hostilities. She was sold for mercantile use as Dutch civilian Jooske W. Vinke in 1954, 718 GRT. She was scrapped in September 1966 at Santander, Spain by Recuperaciones Submarines S.A.
