= Timeline of Darwin history =

This list shows notable events for Darwin, nowadays the capital city of the Northern Territory, Australia. Note: When Darwin was first settled, it was called Palmerston and the port was called Port Darwin. In 1911 the town was renamed Darwin due to the common usage of the name.

== 19th century ==
Year	Date	Event
1839	9 Sep	HMS Beagle sailed into Darwin Harbour during its surveying of the area. John Clements Wickham named the area Port Darwin in honour of their former shipmate Charles Darwin. The settlement became the town of Palmerston in 1869 and was renamed Darwin in 1911.
1862	24 Jul	John McDouall Stuart reached the beach at Chambers Bay (east of present-day Darwin).
1869	5 Feb	George Goyder and survey party arrive in Port Darwin (Palmerston)
1869	27 Mar	Gulnare arrives in Darwin with stores and reinforcements.
1869	24 May	J. W. O. Bennett speared by Aborigines; he died and was buried on top of Fort Hill later being moved to the Pioneers Section of the General Cemetery.
1869	9 Aug	Richard Hazard died of consumption. Buried on Fort Hill and later moved, 3 November 1965, to McMillans Road Cemetery

=== 1870s ===
Year	Date	Event
1870		Construction of the first Government House
1870		Palmerston Cemetery opened in Goyder Road. The cemetery closed in 1919.
1870	15 Sep	First telegraph pole planted in a ceremony by Harriet Douglas.
1871		First Telegraph office erected in Palmerston
1871	7 Nov	Undersea cable comes ashore the telegraph fleet then lays the cable to Java
1872	22 Aug	The Overland Telegraph Line linking Darwin and Adelaide opened.
1873		Protestant church built in Knuckey Street near Mitchell Street. Destroyed in the cyclone of 1897.
1873		English, Scottish and Australian (E S & A) Bank establishes branch in Palmerston (Darwin)
1873	November	Northern Territory Times begins publishing and ceases 1932.
1874		Chinese start to be brought to Darwin to act as labourers.
1874	19 Jun	First Hospital above Doctors Gully completed. It was built largely by public subscription, and is extended further in 1876.
1874	5 Dec	Town of Palmerston gazetted. name changed to Darwin in 1911.
1875	25 Feb	SS Gothenburg lost off coast of Queensland with many prominent Northern Territory citizens on board.
1877	January	First school opens in Palmerston with 34 pupils; teacher John Holt.
1879		Main section of Government House completed.
1879	October	New Police Station building in use on the corner of Mitchell Street and the Esplanade. Now the site of the Supreme Court.

=== 1880s ===
Year	Date	Event
1882		Fannie Bay Gaol was built between 1882 and 1883.
1882	April	Northern Territory Racing Club is established at Palmerston.
1882	17 Aug	Foundation stone laid for Town Hall, on Smith Street, which was designed by John George Knight.
1883	5 Mar	Palmerston Town Hall opens on Smith Street. Destroyed by Cyclone Tracy, now only the remains at both ends are visible.
1883	1 Jun	Northern Australian (Newspaper) begins publishing.
1883	20 Sep	Fannie Bay Gaol opens and begins to receive prisoners.
1885		Commencement of rail services to Pine Creek starts.
1885	March	Terminus Hotel on Smith Street opened.
1885	February	Foundation stone laid for Browns Mart at the time known as "Solomon's Mart" located on Smith Street.
1886		First wooden jetty complete and handed over.
1886	4 Dec	Steam locomotive 'Sandfly' arrives in the NT aboard the vessel Armistice
1887		Commercial Bank completed known as the "Stone Bank" on the corner of Smith and Bennett Streets.
1887		Original Fannie Bay Gardens moved to present site of Darwin Botanical Gardens.
1887	20 May	Locomotive 'Sandfly' begins operation and retires in 1950 presently located at the Parap Qantas Hangar.
1888		6122 Chinese living in the Northern Territory. most in or around Darwin.
1888		First Catholic Church completed located on Smith Street where the present day cathedral is sited.
1888	27 Apr	SS Ellengowan sinks in Darwin Harbour.
1888	16 Jul	Railway service to Adelaide River begins.
1888	10 Dec	Railway service to Burrundie begins.
1889	1 Oct	Opening of Darwin/Pine Creek railway, 145 miles 34 chains.

=== 1890s ===
Year	Date	Event
1890	6 Jun	North Australian and Times newspapers amalgamate.
1891		Victoria Hotel completed then called North Australian Hotel renamed to Victoria Hotel in 1896.
1891		Rapid Creek mission is abandoned.
1897	6-7 Jan	Cyclone devastates Palmerston (Darwin).

== Twentieth century ==
=== 1900s ===
Year	Date	Event
1902		Original Christ Church opens in Palmerston. It is destroyed in 1974 by Cyclone Tracy.
1903		New jetty completed.
1906	15 Aug	Father Francis Xavier Gsell MSC arrives in Palmerston.
1907		Some hotels and private homes in Palmerston are lit by acetylene gas.

=== 1910s ===
Year	Date	Event
1911	1 Jan	Transfer of Northern Territory from South Australia to Commonwealth.
1911		Palmerston renamed to Darwin as most of the town residents were already using the name.
1911		Palmerston No. 1 Boy Scout troop is established.
1911	May	Northern Territory Supreme Court established first judge Samuel James Mitchel.l
1912		Electricity generation begins when the Northern Territory Administration and Mr Felix Holmes begin producing power.
1913	25 Sep	Darwin Radio Station comes into service in Gardens Road.
1913	19 Oct	Kahlin Compound opens.
1914		Construction of Vesteys meatworks on Bullocky Point begins.
1915		Darwin Town Council was created.
1917		First killing season at Vesteys meatworks.
1918	17 Dec	The Darwin Rebellion takes place, with 1000 demonstrators demanding the resignation of the Administrator of the Northern Territory, John A. Gilruth.
1919		Airstrip cleared in Parap.
1919		Gardens cemetery opens replacing Palmerston cemetery on Goyder Road. Closes in 1970 containing 1200 graves.
1919	20 Feb	Dr John A. Gilruth and his family depart Darwin in the night aboard HMAS Encounter after Government House being placed under virtual siege for several weeks.
1919	10 Dec	Captain Ross Smith and his crew landed in Darwin and won a £10,000 Prize from the Australian Government for completing the first flight from London to Australia in under thirty days.

=== 1920s ===
Year	Date	Event
1920		Vesteys meatworks closes. It was used for a short time in 1925, but never operated again after that.
1922		High School classes commence in Darwin. Victor Lampe is the principal. Preparatory class and examinations for entry held in 1921.
1922	20 Oct	Soldiers' Memorial Hall was opened on Smith Street.
1924		Construction of oil tanks (Oil & Fuel Installation (OFI)) starts on Stokes Hill. The oil tanks were to provide a naval refuelling facilities as part of the Singapore Strategy.
1925		Lyons Cottage built on the corner of The Esplanade and Knuckey Streets.
1928	22 Feb	Bert Hinkler arrives in Darwin on first solo flight between England and Australia.
1929	1 Sep	Star Theatre on Smith Street opens.
1929	October	Four oil tanks on Stokes Hill completed and filled.

=== 1930s ===
Year	Date	Event
1930	24 May	Amy Johnson arrives in Darwin. She becomes the first female aviator to conquer the London to Darwin solo flight.
1931		Leprosarium starts operation on Channel Island and closes in 1955.
1931	November	Terminus Hotel closes on Cavenagh Street where the current Civic Centre is located.
1932	8 Jan	Terminus Hotel demolished. Materials from the demolition are used in the building of the fortification on East Point.
1932	17 May	Australian Cabinet approves the "Emergency Scheme for the Fortification of Darwin"
1932	2 Sep	"Darwin Detachment", 5 officers and 42 men arrive in Darwin to start building fortifications.
1934	22 May	2 newly installed guns test fired on East Point.
1934	30 Dec	QANTAS hangar in Parap built.
1934		Darwin City Council builds a power station in Woods Street.
1937	March	Darwin hit by severe cyclone, only one life was lost.
1937	13 Apr	Site selected for RAAF Base.
1937		Darwin's first power station built on Lindsey Street and 24-hour service is provided.
1938		Commencement of the construction of the RAAF Base.
1938		Francis Xavier Gsell created first Catholic Bishop of Darwin.
1939		Burnett House built on Myilly Point now part of the National Trust precinct.
1939		Five steel elevated water storage tanks are completed around Darwin. A ground level tank is erected at Stokes Hill and the elevated water control tank constructed at RAAF Base Darwin.
1939	March	Two hundred men of Mobile Force arrive in Darwin to man fortification.

=== 1940s ===
Year	Date	Event
1940		Hotel Darwin completed on Herbert Street.
1940		Boom Defence Net across Darwin Harbour put in place.
1940	7 Jun	Second power station located on Armidale Street is commissioned. Closed in 1968.
1941	12 Dec	General evacuation of women, children, the aged and infirm of Darwin begins, five days after the bombing of Pearl Harbor.
1942	January	Myilly Point Hospital opens as a 90-bed pavilion type hospital.
1942	1 Jan	Aircraft carrier USS Langley operates anti-submarine patrols.
1942	21 Jan	I-124 was an I-121-class submarine of the Imperial Japanese Navy that was sunk off Darwin, Northern Territory, Australia, on 21 January 1942, during World War II. I-124 was conducting mine laying operations and attacking shipping along with three other submarines along the northern coast of Australia.
1942	19 Feb	Japanese air raids – almost 100 attacks against sites in the Northern Territory, Western Australia and Queensland (to 1943). Bombing of Darwin sees largest attack on Australia by a foreign power. 243 people were killed in the initial raids on 19 February 1942.
1943		Construction of oil storage tunnels begins.
1945	October	Boom Defence Net which crossed the entrance to Darwin Harbour removed.
1946		Reticulated water supply is made available to Darwin residents.
1946		Residents return to Darwin after end of WW2.
1946		Chung Wah Society established.
1949	10 Mar	Town of Nightcliff gazetted.

=== 1950s ===
Year	Date	Event
1951	1 Sep	First Darwin Exhibition (Show) at Winnellie Show grounds.
1952	7 Aug	Last execution conducted at Fannie Bay Gaol.
1952	8 Feb	NT News begins publishing.
1954	20 Apr	Defection of Mrs Petrov at Darwin Airport sparks Petrov Affair.
1955	3 Jan	Premiere of Jedda film in the Star Theatre.
1956	February	Darwin High School opens on Bullocky Point—the site of the old Vestey's meatworks.
1956	November	New Stokes Hill Wharf opens.
1957	1 Jul	The people of Darwin elected for the first time a Mayor and 12 Councillors.
1958		Vestey's meatworks demolished.
1958	12 Feb	Parap School opens.
1958	13 Jul	Foundation stone laid for St Mary's War Memorial Cathedral.
1959	26 Jan	Darwin, with a population of 12,700, becomes a city due to an extensive increase in population and economic growth.

=== 1960s ===
Year	Date	Event
1960		New Post Office constructed on the corner of Smith and Knuckey Street.
1960	May	Parap swimming pool opened.
1960	17 Jun	Woolworths buys out A. E. Jolly & Co on the corner of Smith Street and Knuckey Street.
1962	14 Jun	Stokes Hill Power Station (Stage 1) opened by the Hon Paul Hasluck MHR. Stage 1 had a capacity of 15 MW or 21.42 MW if the diesel station is included.
1962	19 Aug	St Mary's War Memorial Cathedral consecrated on Smith Street.
1963	February	Larrakeyah School opens.
1965		Paspalis drive-in theatre opens in Nightcliff closed in 1985.
1965	January	Sound Shell in the Gardens amphitheatre is opened. Official opening 22 May 1965 by Mayor N. H. Cooper.
1965	11 May	Dead baby found in mailbag, crime never solved.
1965	August	30 Squadron forms Darwin detachment and installs 4 Bloodhound missiles near Lee Point an additional 4 are added later.
1966	May	Stuart Park School opens.
1966	25 Jun	Rapid Creek Primary School opened by the Administrator R. L. Dean.
1967	19 Jun	Darwin Maru arrives on its maiden voyage to load the first shipment of iron ore from the new iron ore handling wharf at Fort Hill.
1967	August	Nightcliff swimming pool opened.
1968		Armidale Street power station closes down.
1968	28 Mar	Reserve Bank building on the corner of Smith and Bennett Streets opened.
1968	September	30 Squadron Darwin detachment ceases operation.
1968	20 Dec	Civic Centre foundation stone laid.
1969	6 May	Kurringal flats complex opens in Fannie Bay.
1969	18 Aug	New Civic Centre in Darwin opened by Duke of Kent.

=== 1970s ===
Year	Date	Event
1970		Construction commences on Darwin River Dam.
1970	February	Nightcliff High School opens, this is Darwin's second high school
1970	November	New Police Headquarters opened on the corner of Mitchell and Bennett Streets.
1971		Travel Lodge on the Esplanade starts construction.
1971		Casuarina Zone substation is built to service the rapidly developing northern suburbs of Darwin.
1971		Casuarina 4.5ML elevated water reservoir constructed.
1971		Nightcliff High School completed.
1971		War Memorial moved to Civic Park behind Browns Mart.
1971	3 Mar	T&G Building on Smith Street opened by the Hon F. C. Chaney CBE AFC.
1971	13 Aug	Darwin gets first TV transmission. Opening of ABD 6 Television studios, 12 August, and the establishment of national (ABC) television services in Darwin.
1972	4 Nov	Train derailment at Frances Bay.
1972	29 Jun	Darwin River Dam officially opened by the Prime Minister the Rt Hon William McMahon.
1972	July	Supersonic passenger plane Concorde lands in Darwin
1972	27 Jul	Town of Sanderson gazetted.
1973		Casuarina High School completed.
1973	7 Feb	Northern Territory Administration abolished and replaced by the Department of the Northern Territory.
1973	24 May	Casuarina Shopping Centre opened.
1973	8 Jun	The Territorian International Hotel officially opened by the Minister for the Northern Territory, K. E. Enderby
1974	25 Feb	Contract awarded for the construction of Casuarina Hospital Main Block to John Holland.
1974	9 Mar	Prince Philip and Earl Louis Mountbatten commence two-day visit to Darwin.
1974	10 Mar	Prince Philip officially opens Darwin Community College.
1974	May	Darwin Rocksitters Club established.
1974	18 May	Travel Lodge on the Esplanade officially opened by Administrator Jack Nelson. It was the tallest building in Darwin at the time at ten storeys.
1974	June	Darwin Golf Club moves from Fannie Bay to Marrara to make room for a new arterial road.
1974	16 Jun	First Darwin Beer Can Regatta.
1974	October	Price control on petrol introduced in the Darwin area.
1974	24-25 Dec	Cyclone Tracy devastates Darwin. 66 known dead.
1975	January	25,000 people evacuated from Darwin in six days after Cyclone Tracy.
1975	14 Feb	Liner Patris arrives in Darwin to act as a floating hostel post Cyclone Tracy.
1975	28 Feb	Darwin Reconstruction Commission established by the Darwin Reconstruction Act.
1975	May	Darwin elects its first female Mayor, Dr Ella Stack.
1975	1 May	Princess Anne and Captain Mark Philips visit Darwin to inspect the damage after Cyclone Tracy.
1975	19 Aug	QANTAS resumes flights to Darwin after Cyclone Tracy.
1975	30 Dec	Telford International Hotel opened, now called the Darwin Frontier Hotel. Previously it was called the Territorian International Hotel which opened on 8 June 1973.
1976	February	1,400 new cyclone-resistant homes in Anula and Walagi completed.
1976	8 Mar	Darwin Motor Vehicle Registry commences business in a new building on Goyder Road.
1976	26 Apr	First Vietnamese boat people arrive in Darwin.
1976	29 May	Reconstruction begins on Christ Church Anglican Cathedral after destruction from Cyclone Tracy.
1976	30 Jun	Palmerston (Darwin) to Pine Creek Railway cease operation by order of the Commonwealth Government.
1976	17 Jul	The annual, long standing, Northern Territory News Walkabout is revived after a lapse and on a new course.
1976	November	Trans Australian Airlines (TAA) opens offices in Bennett Street.
1976	23 Nov	The new $1.4 million Customs House is opened by the Minister for Business and Consumer Affairs, Mr John Howard MP.
1976	December	Darwin Reconstruction Commission proposes to convert part of Smith Street into a mall.
1977	January	Price control on petrol in the Northern Territory lifted.
1977	13 Mar	New Christ Church Cathedral consecrated in the presence of the Archbishop of Canterbury. The Cathedral replaced the church that was destroyed in Cyclone Tracy.
1977	26 Mar	Her Royal Highness Queen Elizabeth II unveils plaques at the Civic Centre to commemorate those that lost their lives in Cyclone Tracy.
1977	9 Nov	Custom Credit House opened by Mr Roger Steele MLA.
1977	31 Dec	Darwin Reconstruction Commission winds up.
1978	April	Work starts on Smith Street mall and is open on 16 November 1979.
1978	5 Apr	Tracy Lodge, the first elderly people's home in Darwin, opens on Wood Street.
1978	12 Apr	Darwin Reconstruction Commission officially closes down.
1978	7 Jul	The first-nuclear powered warship to visit Darwin, the USS Bainbridge, anchors in Darwin Harbour on a six-day goodwill visit.
1978	25 Sep	AMP building opened by the Chief Minister Paul Everingham.
1978	28 Sep	Darwin's new Chinese Temple, located between Woods and Litchfield Streets is officially opened.
1978	23 Oct	Indonesian Consulate is established in Darwin.
1979	19 May	Inaugural Freds Pass Rural Show opens.
1979	1 Jul	First Bougainvillea Festival with entertainer Mr Rolf Harris as patron and special guest. Later called the Darwin Festival.
1979	21 Jul	The gigantic salt water crocodile, Sweetheart, dies while being captured.
1979	1 Sep	Fannie Bay Gaol closes and a new $4.2 M Darwin Prison opens at Berrimah. 116 prisoners are transferred over two days.
1979	21 Sep	First casino in Darwin opens in temporary quarters in the Don Hotel on Cavenagh Street.
1979	November	Dr Ella Stack became Darwin's first Lord Mayor.
1979	16 Nov	Work is completed on Darwin's Smith Street shopping mall and is officially opened by Mayor Dr Ella Stack.

=== 1980s ===
Year	Date	Event
1980	11 Feb	Casuarina Library opened by the Hon Nicholas Donda MLA.
1980	24 Apr	Town of Palmerston is gazetted; it was being called Darwin East.
1980	May	Work starts on Karama subdivision in the Northern Suburbs.
1980	22 Jul	Dick Ward Drive officially opened by the Hon Roger Steele MLA.
1980	25 Jul	The Governor General Sir Zelman Cowen open the Darwin's 29th Annual Show the first to be declared Royal.
1980	19 Sep	New hospital at Casuarina is opened by Prime Minister J. M. Fraser.
1981	4 Mar	Paspalis Centrepoint on Smith Street opened by the Chief Minister Paul Everingham.
1981	14 Jul	New Fort Hill Wharf is opened.
1981	10 Sep	Northern Territory Museum of Arts and Sciences officially opened by Sir Zelman Cowen Governor General of Australia at Bullocky Point.
1981	4 Dec	West Lane Car Park opened by the Chief Minister Paul Everingham MLA.
1981	10 Dec	Darwin Plaza on Smith Street opened by the Hon Paul Everingham Chief Minister.
1981	20 Dec	Bagot Road Flyover officially open by the Hon Nick Dondas MLA.
1981	24 Dec	Administrators Office, on the corner of Smith Street and the Esplanade, opens after being repaired from the damage done by Cyclone Tracy.
1982	3 Jul	Parap open air market begins in Darwin.
1982	17 Sep	Casuarina Coastal Reserve is officially declared a Conversation Area.
1982	6 Oct	Darwin Naval Base extensions at Larrakeyah are officially opened by Queen Elizabeth II.
1982	29 Oct	Lindy and Michael Chamberlain convicted of murder of their daughter Azaria, Lindy jailed in Berrimah Jail
1983	21 Apr	Mindil Beach Federal Hotel Casino officially opened by the Hon Paul Everingham the Chief Minister.
1983	19 Sep	Restored Fannie Bay Gaol is officially re-opened as a museum by the Hon Marshall Perron.
1984	23 Jun	Menzies School of Health Research is officially opened by the Governor General Sir Ninian Stephen.
1984	20 Oct	Singer Cliff Richard performs at the Darwin Amphitheatre.
1984	21 Dec	Darwin Community College renamed the Darwin Institute of Technology.
1985	14 Apr	Tropical Cyclone Gretel (Cat 2) fells a large number of trees in Darwin but there is minimal structural damage.
1985	27 May	RAAF Mirage 3 crashes on approach to Darwin Airport. Pilot ejected safely and the aircraft landed on the mud flats
1985	22 Jun	First local council elections held in Palmerston.
1985	28 Jun	Berrimah Police Centre opened by the Hon Ian Tuxworth.
1986	7 Feb	Lindy Chamberlain released from Berrimah Jail when evidence of her innocence emerges
1986	23 Apr	Beaufort Hotel complex opens on the Esplanade.
1986	19 May	Performing Arts Centre completed, now known as the Darwin Entertainment Centre. Opened by Commodore E. E. Johnston AM OBE.
1986	14 Jul	The Sheraton Hotel opens on Mitchell Street. Currently known as the Hilton.
1986	29 Nov	Pope John Paul II visits Darwin.
1987	1 Jan	First boat passes through the lock of the Darwin Fishing Harbour Mooring Basin (known by locals as the Duckpond).
1987	23 Feb	The University College of the Northern Territory is opened in the remodelled old Darwin Hospital building at Myilly Point.
1987	23 Apr	The Mindil Beach Markets open.
1987	24 May	O'Loughlin Catholic College is officially opened.
1987	6 Sep	Channel Island Power Station opened.
1987	1 Nov	First World Solar Car Challenge, a solar-powered car race from Darwin to Adelaide, starts at Casuarina Shopping Square.
1987		Stokes Hill Power Station is closed.
1988	23 Apr	Atrium Hotel on the Esplanade opened by the Chief Minister Steve Hatton MLA.
1988	May	The Cullen Bay Marina Agreement is signed and development commences.
1988	31 Oct	First Private Hospital in the Northern Territory is officially opened.
1988	December	Pioneer Walk and Bicentennial Park are opened along The Esplanade.
1989	1 Jan	The first concert of the complete Darwin Symphony Orchestra takes place in Darwin.
1989	28 Apr	The Northern Territory University, formed on 1 January by the amalgamation of the Darwin Institute of Technology and the University College of the Northern Territory, is officially opened.
1989	2 Oct	The Territory Wildlife Park, south of Darwin, is opened to the public.

=== 1990s ===
Year	Date	Event
1990	2 Jun	Darwin Aviation Museum opens on a site near Darwin Airport.
1990	2 Aug	Foundation stone for new Parliament House laid
1991	Jan	Ansett airlines first ever January sale offers discounted airfares from Darwin to Alice Springs from $648 to $299 and Darwin to Sydney was reduced from $1,156 to $499.
1991	18 May	First Arafura Sports Festival held in Darwin and then every 2 years until 2011 (except 2003 due to SARS) cancelled in 2012 by CLP Government. 20 teams from Australia and South East Asia to compete in more than 20 sports.
1991	28 Jun	FM Radio station Hot 100 goes to air in Darwin.
1991	21 Jul	Lake Alexander officially open by Alan K Markham, Lord Mayor of Darwin.
1991	29 Nov	The new Supreme Court Building, part of the State Square project, is officially open by the Administrator, the Hon James Muirhead AC QC.
1992		Darwin's water supply is chlorinated at Darwin River Dam.
1992		The Bayview Haven housing development commences in Darwin.
1994	1 Jun	The Deck Chair Cinema opens in Darwin with the film The Castanet Club.
1994	18 Aug	The new Parliament House building in State Square is opened by the Governor General the Hon Bill Hayden AC.
1994	14 Sep	North Flinders International House opens for the accommodation of students on the campus of the Northern Territory University.
1995	15 Feb	The annual Bougainvillea Festival of Darwin changes its name to The Festival of Darwin.
1995	22 Mar	The Palmerston campus of the Northern Territory University opens.
1996	22 Sep	Physician-assisted death of Bob Dent, the first under the Rights of the Terminally Ill Act 1995.
1996	22 Nov	The new Menzies School of Health Research Building at the hospital campus is opened.
1997	7 Feb	The Darwin Club, one of Darwin's oldest, winds up operations in Admiralty House on the Esplanade after closing its doors in 1996.
1997	12 Feb	Two 70m chimneys, landmarks of the Darwin skyline and the last remaining evidence of the original Stokes Hill Power Station, are demolished.
1997	3 Mar	The Holiday Inn opens on The Esplanade in Darwin.
1997	14 Apr	The All Seasons Darwin Central hotel is opened in Smith Street on the former site of the Darwin Post Office on the corner of Smith and Knuckey Streets.
1997	19 Apr	Refurbished Civic Centre opened by Dr Neil Conn AO.
1997	24 Jul	The Myilly Point campus of the Northern Territory University is closed, completing the consolidation of the University on the Casuarina campus.
1997	3 Nov	The Navy patrol boat HMAS Gawley topples when a shiplift collapses at Darwin Patrol Base.
1998	27 Mar	Darwin's second commercial television station, Channel 7, begins broadcasting in Darwin.
1998	8 Apr	Charles Darwin National Park officially declared by the Hon Tim Baldwin MLA.
1998	21 Apr	The Duke of Edinburgh commences a five-day visit to Darwin.
1999	22 Mar	A fire in a major Darwin sub-station causes more than $400,000 worth of damage and blacks out 9,000 northern suburbs houses.
1999	11 Sep	The historic Hotel Darwin is declared structurally unsound and is demolished.

== 21st century ==
=== 2000s ===
Year	Date	Event
2000		East Arm Port opens
2003	21 Aug	The Northern Territory Legislative Assembly passed the Charles Darwin University Act 2003 (NT).
2003	17 Sep	Alice Springs to Darwin railway completed.
2004	1 Jan	Charles Darwin University is formed from merging Alice Springs' Centralian College and the Menzies School of Health Research with the Northern Territory University.
2004	17 Jan	First freight train reaches Darwin on the new Adelaide to Darwin railway.
2004	4 Feb	First passenger train from Adelaide, The Ghan, reaches Darwin.
2008	1 Jul	Convention Centre opens in the Waterfront Precinct.
2009		Major power stations in Darwin receive gas from the Bonaparte Basin offshore.
2009	4 Jun	Four killed in mass shooting.
2009	July	East Point Military Museum was renamed as Darwin Military Museum.

=== 2010s ===
Year	Date	Event
2010		Iron Ore Wharf removed at Fort Hill.
2010		Darwin River Dam spillway is raised by 1.3 metres.
2010	30 Aug - 1 Sep	Riot and escapes at Northern Immigration Detention Centre.
2011	17 Feb	Cyclone Carlos brings rain and high winds to Darwin.
2011	June	Darwin experiences coldest June on record, with 42 nights below 20 degrees.
2011	16 Nov	President Barack Obama spends two hours in Darwin to lay a wreath at the USS Peary memorial and speaks to the Australian and US troops stationed there.
2012	25 Oct	The dredge Athena arrives in Darwin Harbour to begin dredging over the following 18 months the shipping channel for the Inpex project.
2012	1 Nov	NT Government announces cancellation of 2013 bi-annual Arafura Games to save money.
2015	6 Apr	Prince Harry arrives in Darwin to start his month long secondment to the ADF's 1st Brigade.
2015	October	Controversy over 99-year lease of Port Darwin to Chinese company.
2015		Last Cab to Darwin movie portrays journey to Darwin in search of euthanasia.
2018	17 Mar	Cyclone Marcus hits Darwin. It uplifts trees and causes powers outages which in some cases lasts for days.
2019	27 Apr	The Arafura Games return to Darwin after an eight-year hiatus.
2019	4 Jun	Mass shooting kills 4.

=== 2020s ===
Year	Date	Event
2020	9 Feb	266 Australian COVID-19 evacuees flown from Wuhan to Darwin for isolation at Howard Springs camp. A week later 200 flown from Diamond Princess in Japan join them.
2020	1 May	NT become one of first areas to relax CoVID-19 restrictions.
2020	14 May	Darwin Correctional Facility has a breakout of 21 prisoners leading to the destruction of some buildings.
2020	15 May	Territorians allowed to visits pubs again after stage 2 restrictions are eased.
2020	2 Jun	Territorians return to work after lifting of stage 3 restrictions.
2020	1 Jul	Territory Day celebrations cancelled due to COVID-19
2020	17 Jul	Border restrictions are lifted for interstate visitors
2020	8 Oct	Fire destroys NT Oriental Emporium on Bagot Road building and contents.
2020	6 Nov	Derelict home in the CBD owned by the Chin family destroyed by fire.
2020	12 Nov	Police launch campaign to end increased youth offending in the Northern Suburbs of Darwin.
2021	27 Jun	Darwin placed into COVID-19 lockdown for 3 days at 1 pm, extended, then lifted 2 July at 1 pm.
