= Ellen Ryan =

Australian publican and entrepreneur

Ellen Ryan (c.1851 – 30 May 1920) was a publican and entrepreneur who became one of the richest women in the Northern Territory of Australia.

== Early life ==
Ryan born in London, United Kingdom around 1851. She married William Ryan on 13 November 1867 in Canowie, South Australia, when she was 16.

== Life in the Northern Territory ==
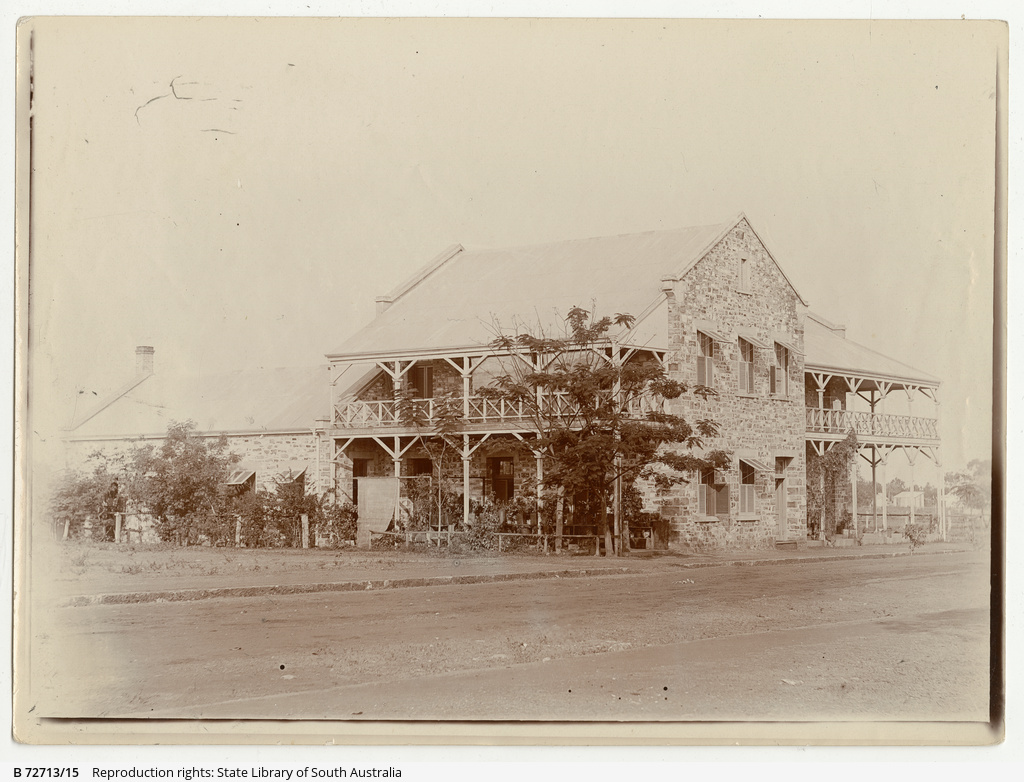
Victoria Hotel, Palmerston, Northern Territory

Ryan and her husband moved to the Northern Territory from Adelaide in 1873 after hearing reports of gold discoveries in the north. She arrived in Darwin, then known as Palmerston, on board the Birchgrove just three years after the town was established by George Goyder. The couple travelled straight to the gold fields near Pine Creek with hundreds of other prospectors. Upon realising that 'liquid gold' was also a lucrative opportunity, the Ryans leased the Miners' Arms Hotel. Over the next 15 years, Ryan earned the reputation of keeping the "best table out of Darwin".

Ryan separated from her husband in 1877 taking out a formal protection order against him in 1881 for her earnings, "owing to his threats, cruelty and drunkenness". She granted him £50 and he left Palmerston shortly after stating he had "had quite enough of the Territory and the people in it".

After the divorce, Ryan consolidated her holdings, buying up land in Palmerston and taking on several mining leases. As the economy cooled, Ryan decided to build a hotel in 1888. Her plans were stalled after sustaining a serious injury falling from her horse, which kicked her in the head. But two years later she succeeded in building a prestigious two-storey hotel in Palmerston which was first named the Royal, but was changed to the North Australian at the last minute. It was eventually named the Victoria Hotel. It opened in 1890 to wide acclaim:

"It only remains to be said that the interior arrangements are of the very best the furnishings of the bedrooms and parlours are both elaborate and tasteful."

This cemented her reputation as one of the Territory's best hostesses in that she organised a variety of entertainments for her hotel residents and local residents; these included harbour excursions, picnics, shooting parties and fancy dress balls.

She was also a sporting enthusiast and owned several racehorses, securing much business for her hotel. She was known to take unpopular position on issues in the town, such as campaigning against the restriction of Chinese immigrants. She had depended on Chinese labour for the construction of and domestic work in her hotel.

Also in 1890, Ryan also applied for a lease to run the Union Hotel, at a mining lease called the Union, in the same year.

In 1895 Ryan was one of the 82 women in the Northern Territory who enrolled to vote after franchise was granted to South Australian and Northern Territory women following the passage of the Women's Suffrage Bill in December 1894 (see: Suffrage in Australia).

In 1896 Ryan relinquished her lease on the North Australian taking out one instead on the nearby Club Hotel, located on the site of the Hotel Darwin. Both pubs were severely damaged in the 1897 cyclone the following year.

Ryan took up the management of the North Australia Hotel, known at this stage as the Victoria Hotel, again in 1901, returning the hotel to the centre of social life in Darwin by establishing a dressmaker adjacent to the hotel and through the hosting of motor launches. The Victoria Hotel was taken under Federal control in 1915, after the Northern Territory separated from South Australia and was transferred to the Commonwealth, in an attempt to control alcohol consumption in the town.

== Later life ==
Ryan retired to Adelaide where she lived with her sister. She remained embroiled in a compensation claim over the 'state' takeover of the Victoria Hotel until her death on 30 May 1920. Ryan is buried in West Terrace Cemetery.

When the hotel was being renovated in 1988, two stones were discovered hidden in a wall's hollow cavity. One featured a sketch of Ellen Ryan, the other was a poem allegedly penned by a "disappointed former lover". It said in part:

She promised she would seek me here
If death was as she thought
Sometimes, less drunk, I think I see
Her lovely ghost form beckon me
Or could it be the liquor has me caught?

At the Vic Hotel in Darwin Town
They'll all be drinking still
Not knowing that her face lies hid
May it haunt them as for me it did
Oh God! This life's a bitter pill!

The stones are encased in glass behind the bar.
