= Christina Gordon =

Australian businesswoman (1863–1952)

Group of clergy and citizens taken at opening of Inter-Church Club including Mrs Christina Gordon.

Christina Gordon MBE (25 December 1863 – 31 October 1952) was an Australian miner, publican and business woman and she has been called the most colourful woman the Northern Territory had ever known'.

== Early life ==
Gordon was most likely born in Bristol in England and little is known of her early life although it is known that she immigrated to Australia as a child. In around 1887 she married Duncan Gordon a teamster and prospector from Queensland and they primarily settled in the Biloela area.

Of the early years of her marriage Gordon would later recall:

For the first few years of my married life I had no home and not a stick of furniture. Our home was wherever we pitched camp. We lived in tents and if we had a camp bed to lie in at night we counted ourselves lucky.

— Christina Gordon, via NT Dictionary of Biography

Gordon and her husband had at least three children together, each sons, two of which were born in Queensland and her third son Wallace is believed to have had a twin who died in infancy.

== Life in the Western Australia and the Northern Territory ==
In the 1890s and early 1900s the family made numerous trips, at least two, to Western Australia for the purposes of mining and, on these trips they would pass through the Northern Territory and, in doing so, she is attributed with pioneering the Tanami region. On one of these trips Gordon and Duncan helped build 58 kilometres (36 mi) of the rabbit-proof fence and were in Halls Creek when the Tanami gold rush began and they travelled there by horse and buggy. In doing so it was claimed that she had been the first 'white woman' in the Tanami and her movements were widely reported in the media. One of these articles called Gordon a "plucky woman" and state that:

There is only one white woman on the field and that was Mrs Gordon, who pioneered at Hannans before it was Kalgoorlie, and has overlanded with hubby to this back of beyond

— A letter from the Tamani, life on the field: a plucky woman, Sunday Times (Perth, 10 July 1910

In the Tanami the Gordon family were successful and, as some of the first arrivals, managed to mine an average of 283 grams (10.0 oz) for some time. Gordon was later attributed as being 'The mother of the Tanami' and this was so much true that she was sometimes referred to as 'Tanami Gordon'.

After leaving the Tanami the family spent some time in Katherine and later in Adelaide River where they ran a store during World War I. In the early 1920s they moved to Pine Creek where in 1924 Gordon took of the license for the Pine Creek Hotel, also known as the Playford Arms Hotel, where she gained a reputation of a capable and popular hostess. In 1926 she also took over the Victoria Hotel and, later, allowed May Brown to take over at the Pine Creek Hotel.

At the Victoria Hotel she established an 'aviator's wall' where she collected signatures of aviators who visited the pub and her most cherished signatures were that of Charles Kingsford Smith, Charles Ulm and Bert Hinkler.She also collected numerous birds that became a much admired feature. In October 1930 Gordon and her sons purchased the Star Theatre and throughout the 1930s grew a large property portfolio in Darwin; including the Gordon's Don Hotel. In 1938 Gordon was made a Member of the Order of the British Empire (MBE).

During World War II Gordon was, against her wishes, compulsorily evacuated from Darwin on 14 January 1942 and returned there as soon as she was able. On her return she struggled to keep the Victoria Hotel viable and it was sold to the Lim family (who were Chinese-Australians) in September 1946 and after this, experiencing illness, she moved to Brisbane.

In her 1951 book The Territory Ernestine Hill said of her:

Of thousands who have known and loved Mrs Christine Gordan in her many years as the proprietress of the Victoria Hotel in Darwin - and many famous names were written in her visitors' book - few heard the stories she might tell of a heroine's life on Australia's trails of gold. Regal and kind, as she listened to all the adventure stories from air, land and sea, she never told her own. She crossed the continent more than once in a buggy, with her young sons on her knee. Through later life she was a friend of all Darwin, and, after the war, returned to the ruined seaport with the first of its faithful, readyto begin again at the age of eighty years. We shall ever remember her Mona Lise smile.

— Ernestine Hill, The Territory (1951)

Gordon died on 31 October 1952 in Brisbane.

== Legacy ==
Christina Court in the Darwin suburb of Parap is named for Gordon.
