= Darwin Beer Can Regatta =

Annual boat festival in Darwin, Australia

Coordinates: 12°26′42″S 130°49′52″E

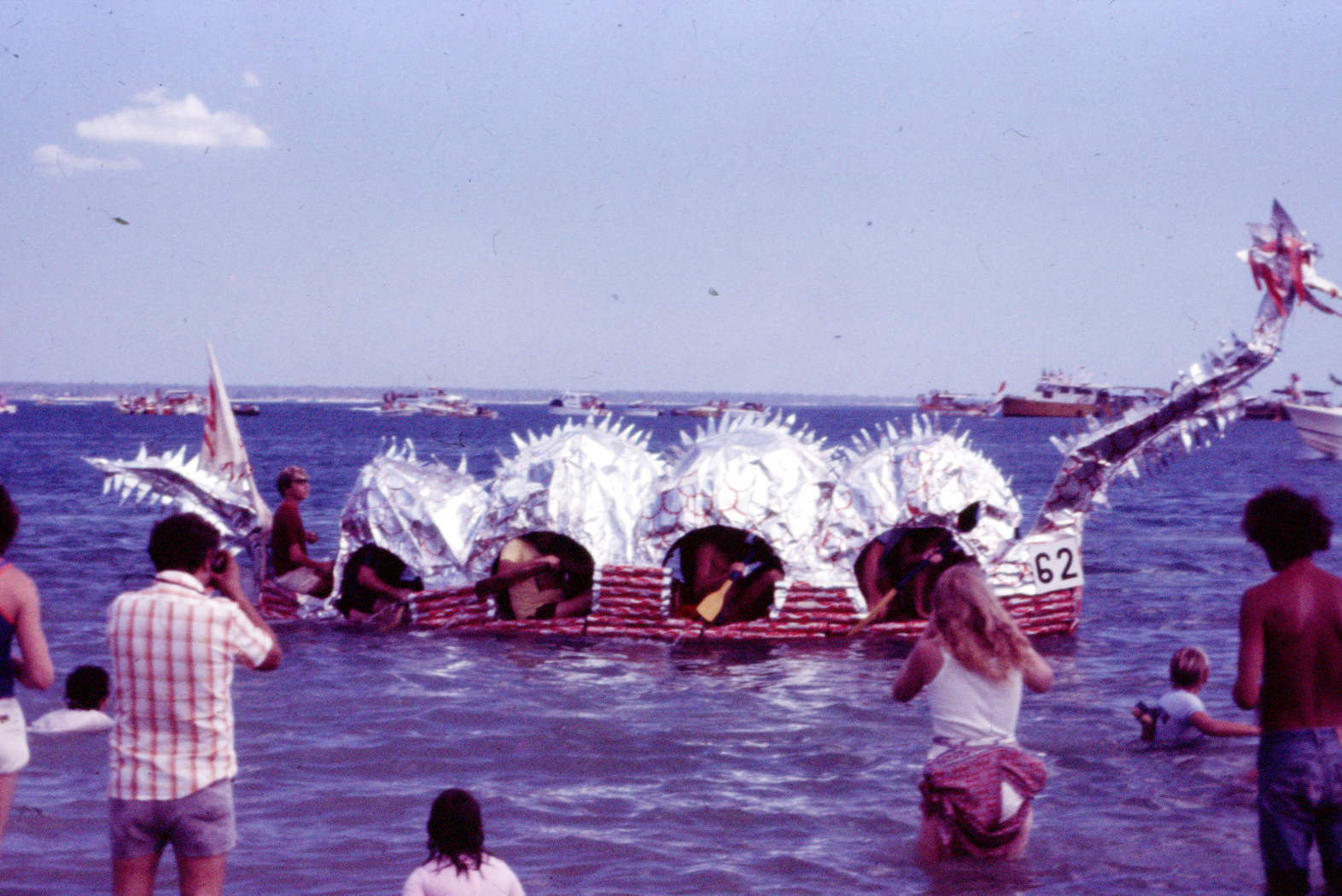
Darwin's Beer Can Regatta in August 1977

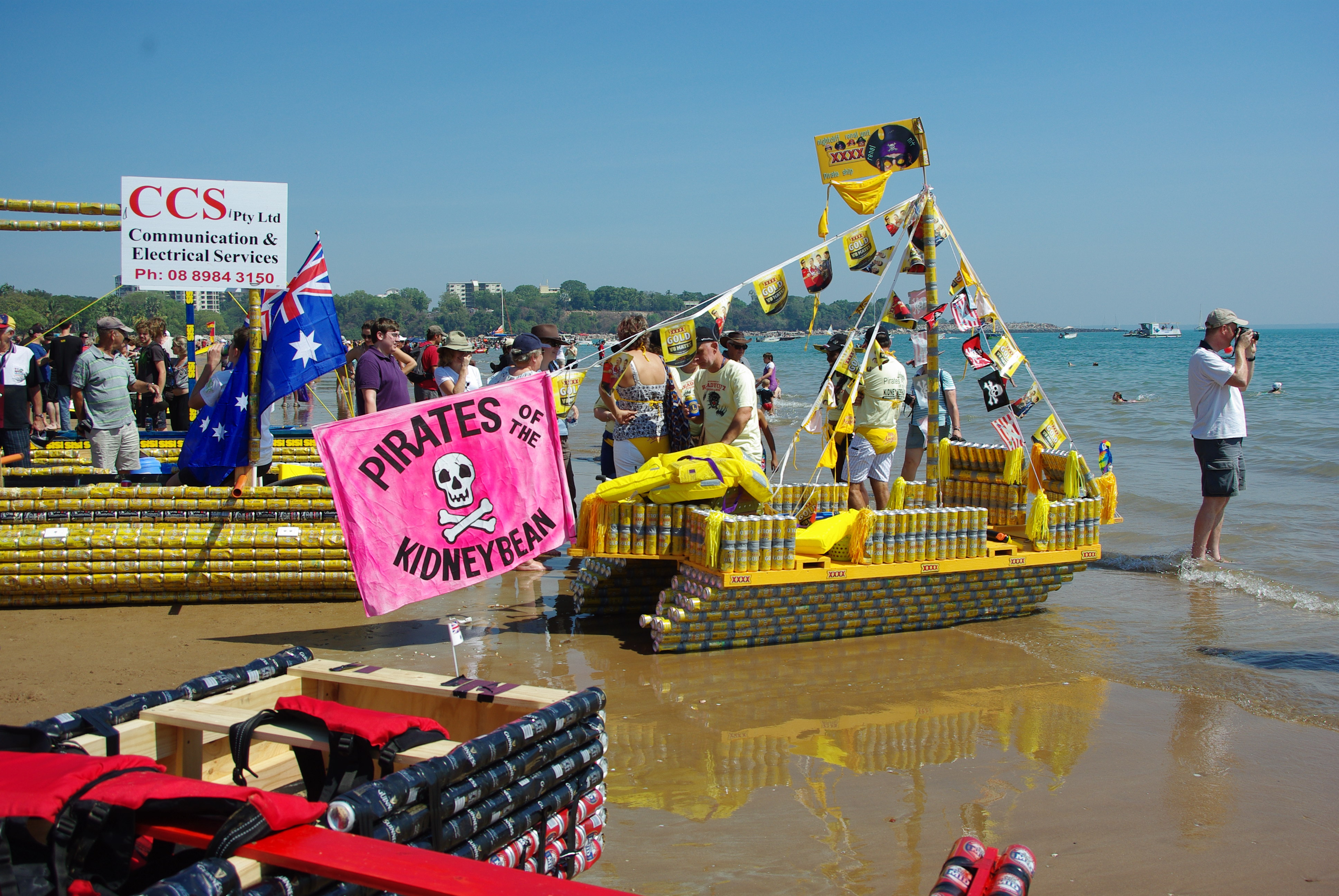
Watercraft at 2009 Darwin Beer Can Regatta

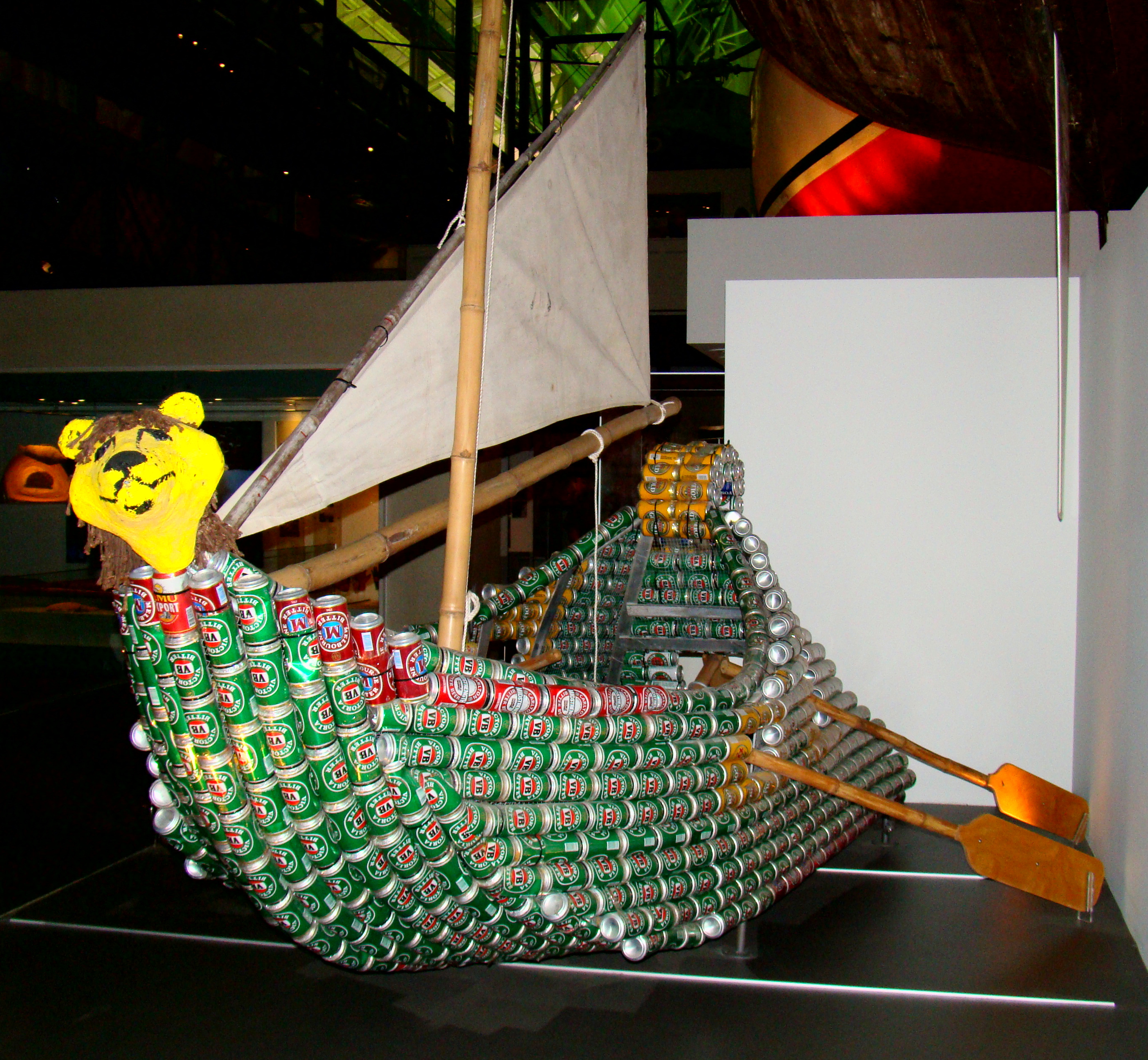
Typical more or less floating construction used in the regatta, now a piece of the collection at the Australian National Maritime Museum in Sydney

The Darwin Beer Can Regatta is an annual festival in which participants create floating vessels from beer cans and cartons in Darwin, Northern Territory, Australia at Mindil Beach. The inaugural event took place in 1974 with 63 entries and was attended by about 22,000 people which was about half of Darwin's population at the time.

== Format ==
Participants create boats using empty beer cans, soft drink cans, soft drink bottle and milk cartons. Up to 30,000 cans have been used for a single boat. The vessels are not tested for seaworthiness, prior to water events, and those that fall apart are part of the day's entertainment. A great many sundry events go along with the regatta, including concerts, sandcastles, a thong-throwing contest, novelty hat competition, and the "Henley-on-Mindil" competition (named after the Henley-on-Todd Regatta), where participants run their "boats" around like Flintstones cars.

== History ==
The Regatta was begun in 1974 by Darwin businessmen, Lutz Frankenfeld and Paul Rice-Chapman, as a way to clean up beer cans littering Darwin's streets. This was the same year the Darwin Rocksitters Club began and, in their early years, they were often closely associated with each other as they were both viewed as celebrating the drinking culture of the Northern Territory.

The Darwin Regional Tourism Promotion Association was the organiser of the event until 1978 when it came under the aegis of the combined Lions Clubs of Darwin.

In the 1980s, the Regatta had about 18 classes, which included motorised beer can boats.

The 2014 Darwin Lions Beer Can Regatta took place on 6 July 2014, watched by 15,000 people and attended by visitors from all over Australia. The winner of the first beer can regatta was Kevin Jaques driving the Darwin Powerboat Club's entry "Pistol Knight". Des Hoare the cricketer and then Sales Manager for Swan Brewery Darwin, presented Jaques with the winning cheques totalling $1,000, doubled because the beer can boat used only Swan beer cans. As Jaques used his 80 hp Mercury Motor he was also presented with a Mercury First sticker. The perpetual trophy is held within the NT Museum storage area and the keepsake trophy is on the mantlepiece at Jaques' home. Jaques holds copies of the news clippings and the photographs of the presentations.

In 2020, the Beer Can Regatta was cancelled due to the COVID pandemic. In its place, on 8 August a much smaller, 4-hour, Mini-Regatta was held in which the vessels were made of milk cartons. Located at Darwin Waterfront Precinct, instead of the usual Mindil Beach venue where as many as 15,000 watched the races, only a few hundred spectators attended.

In 2021, the Regatta was back at Mindil Beach on Sunday 5 September from 10am to 5pm, and in 2022 it was on 26 June. In 2023 it was held on 16 July.

== See also ==
- Beer Can House
- Beer can racing
