= Stokes Hill Power Station =

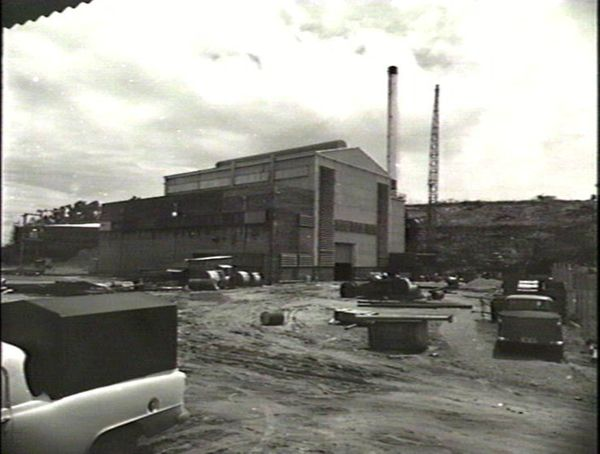
- Country: Australia
- Location: Darwin, Northern Territory
- Coordinates: 12.46500000°S 130.84972222°E
- Status: Decommissioned
- Commission date: 1962
- Decommission date: 1987
- Owner: Northern Territory Electricity Commission (NTEC)
- Operator: Northern Territory Electricity Commission (NTEC)

Thermal power station
- Primary fuel: Oil

Power generation
- Nameplate capacity: 141 MW

External links
- Website: territorygeneration.com.au/about-us/our-history/darwins-heritage-power-stations/

Stokes Hill Power Station was an oil-fired thermal power station in Darwin, Northern Territory, Australia. During its operating life, it was the largest power station in the Northern Territory, although it was considered unreliable and highly inefficient. Stokes Hill's high operating costs required government to heavily subsidise power bills for Darwin residents, who frequently experienced supply disruptions.

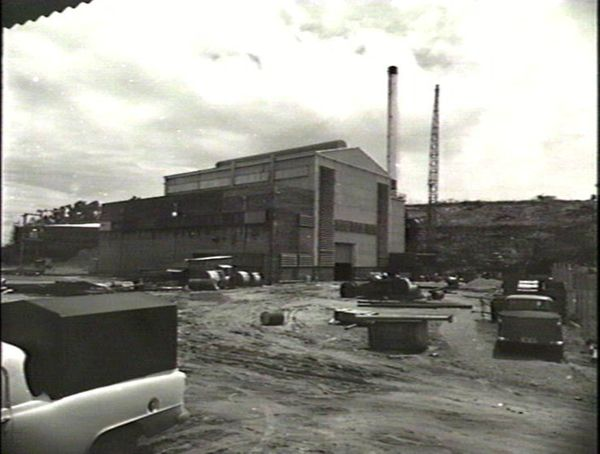
The former Stokes Hill Power Station, date unknown

== History ==
Design specifications in 1957 forecast that demand could initially be met by two turbo-alternator units of 74 MW each, with an additional smaller unit of 15 MW capacity expected to be required by 1971. At its opening on 14 June 1962 however, the station was only capable of generating 15 MW Within months of opening, it was already apparent that even the originally specified capacity would be insufficient to meet the growing demand. The Australian Bureau of Statistics indicate that by 1969, the power station was operating with four units, for a maximum installed capacity of 47 MW. By 1977, further upgrades had brought the capacity up to its ultimate 141 MW.

When Cyclone Tracy hit Darwin in 1974, the power station closed in the early hours of Christmas morning. Damage to the building by winds and storm surges resulted in flooding that damaged electrical equipment, while transmission lines and substations were completely destroyed. In the days immediately following the storm, small diesel generators were brought online at Stokes Hill in order to provide power to the old Darwin Hospital, located at Myilly Point in Larrakeyah. It was not until 25 January that power began to be restored to large parts of the city.

Stokes Hill Power Station proved unreliable during its operational life, often unable to provide uninterrupted power supply for the city. A series of failures saw the power station supplemented with an additional 30 MW natural gas generator at Berrimah in 1979.

Ownership of the power station was transferred from the Commonwealth to the Northern Territory Electricity Commission (NTEC) when the Northern Territory achieved self-government in 1978. In addition to reliability issues and the high cost of oil, by this time base-load demand for electricity in Darwin was growing at a rate of 3.5% per annum. These factors led to NTEC seeking a site for a new, modern power station. The Channel Island site in Darwin Harbour's Middle Arm was selected in 1981.

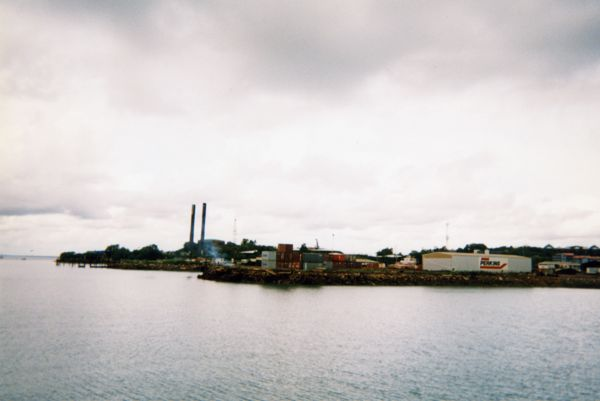
Demolition of chimneys at the former Stokes Hill Power Station

The power station was decommissioned in 1987, following completion of the Channel Island Power Station. It sat dormant for nearly a decade until demolition was completed in 1997. Today, little trace of the power station is evident at the site, which is a short distance from the new Darwin Waterfront Precinct.
