= Port Darwin =

Port of Darwin, Australia

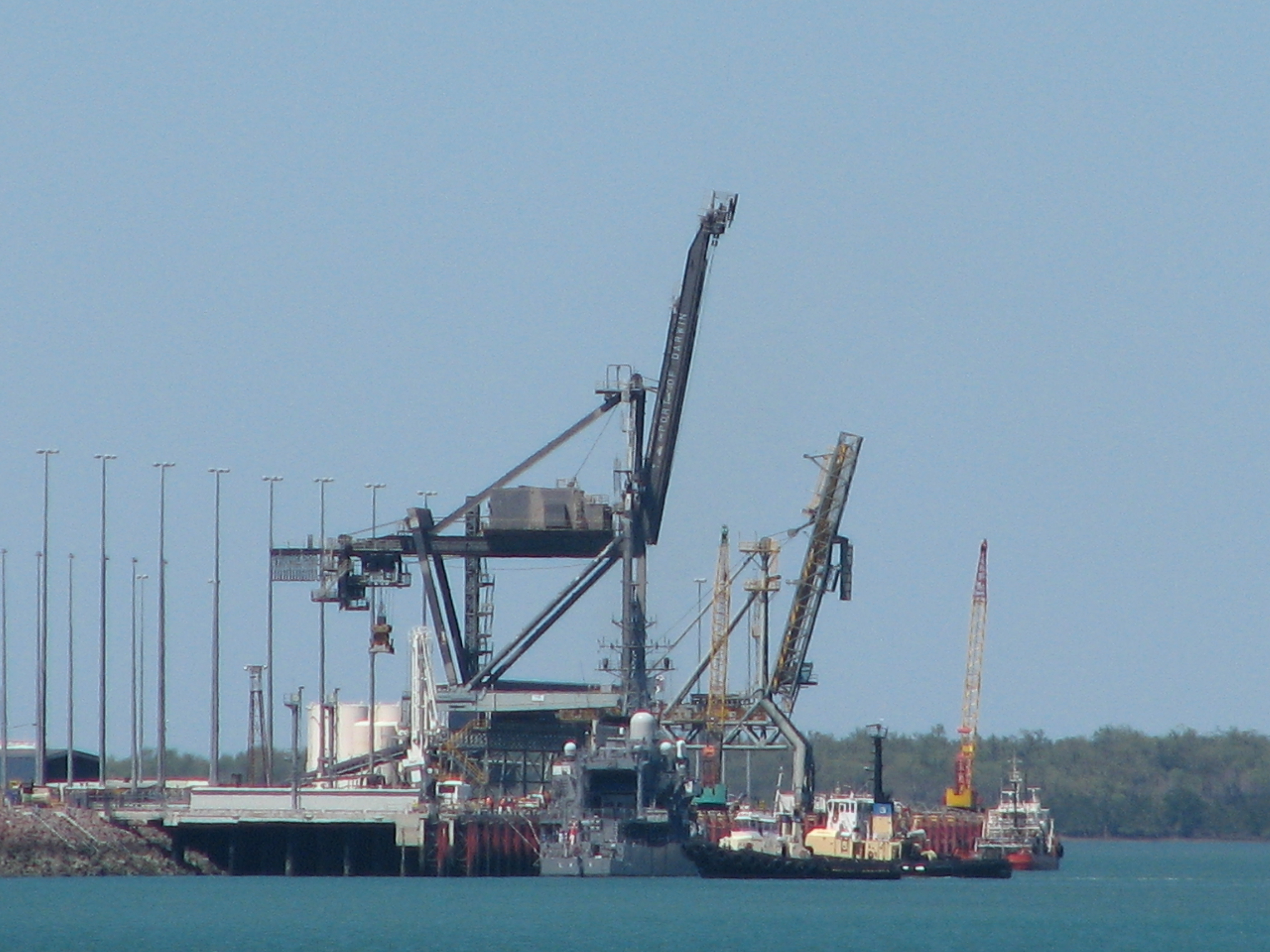
- East Arm Port facilities
- Interactive map of Port Darwin
- Location within Australia

Location
- Country: Australia
- Location: Darwin, Northern Territory
- Coordinates: 12.4708°S 130.8483°E

Details
- Operated by: Darwin Port Operations
- Type of Harbor: Coastal natural
- No. of berths: 5
- No. of wharfs: 4

Statistics
- Website https://www.darwinport.com.au/

Port Darwin is the port in Darwin, Northern Territory, and is the most northerly port in Australia. The port has operated in a number of locations, including Stokes Hill Wharf, Cullen Bay, and East Arm Wharf.

Since 2015, the port has been controlled by the Chinese-owned Landbridge Group, having been granted a 99-year lease by the federal and territory governments. The transaction has since ignited significant national security concerns and political controversy, with considerable bipartisan appetite to return the port to Australian ownership.

== Locations ==
Stokes Hill Wharf operated as the main location of Port Darwin, and has had three wharves.

East Arm Wharf opened in 2000. Panamax sized ships of a maximum length of 274 metres and a DWT of up to 80,000 tonnes are able to use the location.

== Privatisation ==
Following the 2012 election of the Country Liberal party, the Territory sought to raise funds for unspecified purposes through the sale of public assets, including the Territory Insurance Office and Darwin Port. In order to accomplish the latter, the Territory made a request for expressions of interest in late 2014 and early 2015, resulting in thirty-three companies signalling their interest.

In October 2015, the Chinese-owned Landbridge Group won the bid for a lease of Port Darwin. The then Country Liberal-controlled Northern Territory Government under then Chief Minister Adam Giles granted the company a 99-year lease for $506 million. The contract price was more than 25 times the profit the port had earned over the preceding two years, and Landbridge also promised to invest $200 million over a 25-year period. Shandong Landbridge Group is a privately held company with headquarters in the city of Rizhao, Shandong Province, China, which is owned by Ye Cheng, a billionaire with close ties to the Chinese Communist Party.

The details of the unsuccessful bids were not disclosed, with the government citing commercial-in-confidence reasons, but sources conflicted over the nature of these bids. Some sources stated that the bid from the Landbridge Group was the highest by a significant margin, while others stated that two bids, one from a European company and another from an Australian company, were comparable. It was hoped that Landbridge's bid would result in new trade routes opening up for the Territory's cattle, mining, and gas industries.

In 2025, former Chief Minister Adam Giles defended his government's 2015 decision to lease, and said if he had the chance, he would do it again. Giles also opposed any moves for the Australian government to take back the port.

=== Security concerns ===
Concerns have been expressed over this leasing arrangement due its strategic significance as part of China's Belt and Road Initiative. Concerns have also been expressed over the proximity of the port to a base where United States Marines are stationed on a rotational basis and to the Darwin International Airport, which is used jointly for military and civilian purposes.

In June 2019, development of a port at Glyde Point, 40 kilometres (25 mi) north of Port Darwin, to be utilised by both military and commercial interests, was suggested as a 'counterbalance' by Federal Liberal Party MP and chair of the Parliamentary Joint Committee on Intelligence and Security Andrew Hastie.

In August 2019, a proposal was launched by Federal Labor MP Nick Champion to re-nationalise the port, thereby ending Chinese control.

A 2021 review of the leasing arrangements found there were no national security grounds to overturn the lease. In October 2023, the federal government announced it would not cancel Landbridge's lease after another review. The announcement brought to an end to an eight-year saga regarding Chinese control of the port.

During the May 2025 Australian federal election campaign, both the Coalition and the Australian Labor Party pledged to return the port to Australian ownership if elected. The PRC's ambassador to Australia, Xiao Qian, criticised the plan. Landbridge applauded the ambassador's comments. In late January 2026, Chinese ambassador Xiao Qian reiterated warnings to the Albanese government that plans to nationalise the port would adversely affect trade and diplomatic relations with China. In May 2026, Landbridge launched legal action against the Australian government at the International Centre for Settlement of Investment Disputes in an attempt to halt the forced sale of the port.

== See also ==
- List of ports in Australia
- Port of Newcastle, another port with a 99-year lease with a Chinese control.
- Naval Base Darwin
