= Joseph Seale =

Australian cricketer

Personal information
- Full name: Joseph Thomas Seale
- Born: 18 April 1855; Sydney, Australia
- Died: 19 August 1941 (aged 86); Newcastle, Australia
- Source: Cricinfo, 19 August 2017

Joseph Thomas Seale (18 April 1855 – 19 August 1941) was an Australian cricketer. He played two first-class matches for New South Wales in 1878 and 1879.

His brothers, Edward (Ted) and George, were also cricketers, though George became better known for his preferred sports of rowing and football, and for being one of the best amateur boxers in the world.

Seale later became a bank manager in Newcastle, New South Wales.

== See also ==
- List of New South Wales representative cricketers
- May Brown (Sister-in-law)
