= Darwin Convention Centre =

Convention centre in Darwin

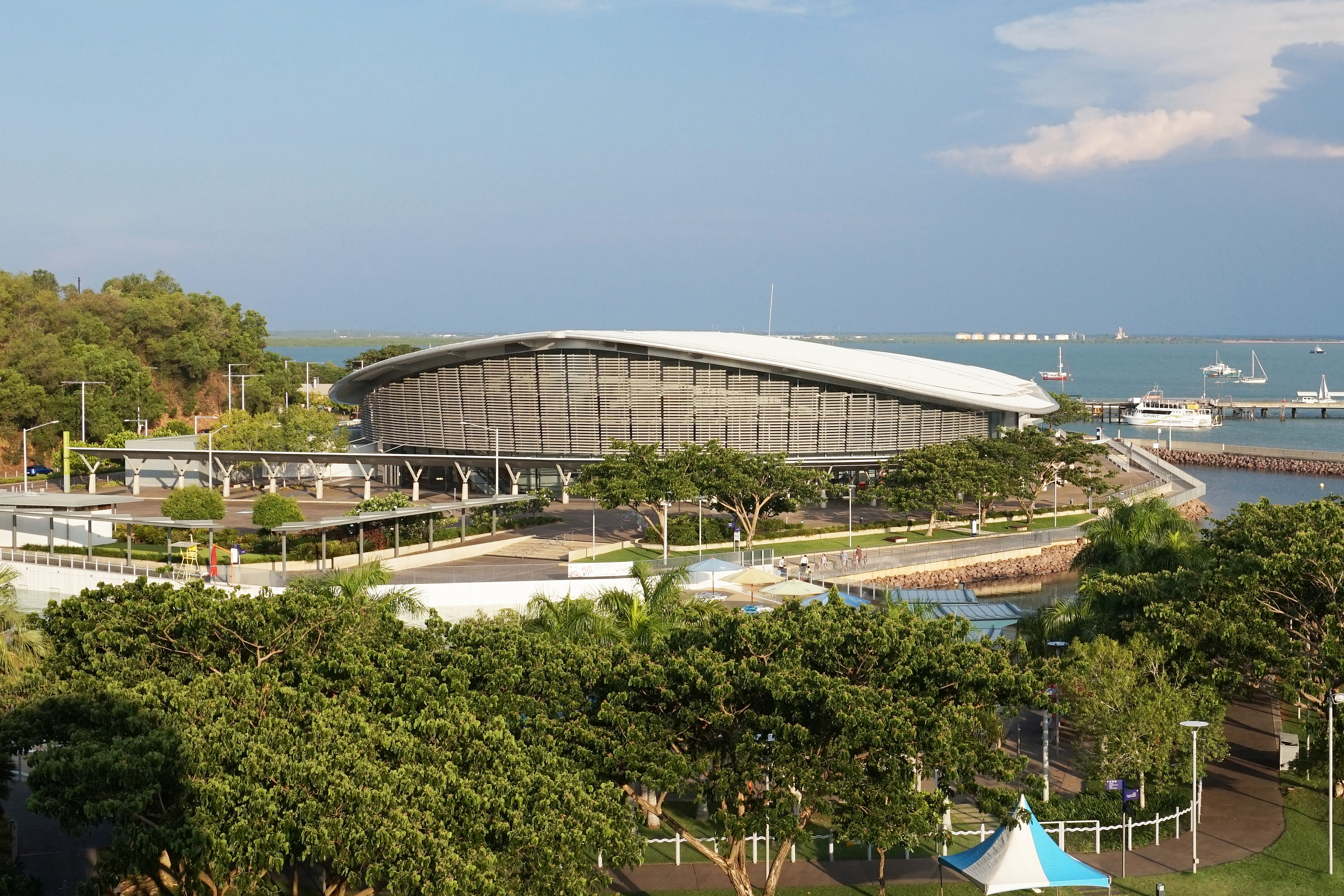
- Darwin Convention Centre in 2015
- Address: Darwin Waterfront Precinct
- Location: Darwin, Northern Territory, Australia
- Coordinates: 12.4673°S 130.8489°E

Construction
- Built: 2006–2008
- Opened: July 2008; 17 years ago

Website
- Official website

The Darwin Convention Centre is a convention centre located in Darwin, Northern Territory, Australia. Construction started on the convention centre in early 2006 and completed in June 2008, with the centre opening in July of that year. The convention centre is part of the $1.1 billion Darwin Waterfront Precinct project.

The centre has a total floor are of 22,900 square metres for conference, exhibition facilities for up to 4,000 delegates.

== Features ==
Features of the centre include:

- A 1,236 seated auditorium.
- Four Halls with an area of 4,000 square metres with the capacity of 7,500 delegates.
- A Waterfront Room with the capacity of more than 1,000 delegates.

== Facilities ==
=== Ground Floor ===
- Auditorium Room
- Four Halls
- Four meeting rooms
- Registration
- Cafe

=== Floor 1 ===
- Auditorium Room

=== Floor 2 ===
- Four Waterfront Rooms
