= Fort Hill (Darwin) =

Former hill in Darwin, Australia

Coordinates: 12°28′09″S 130°50′42″E

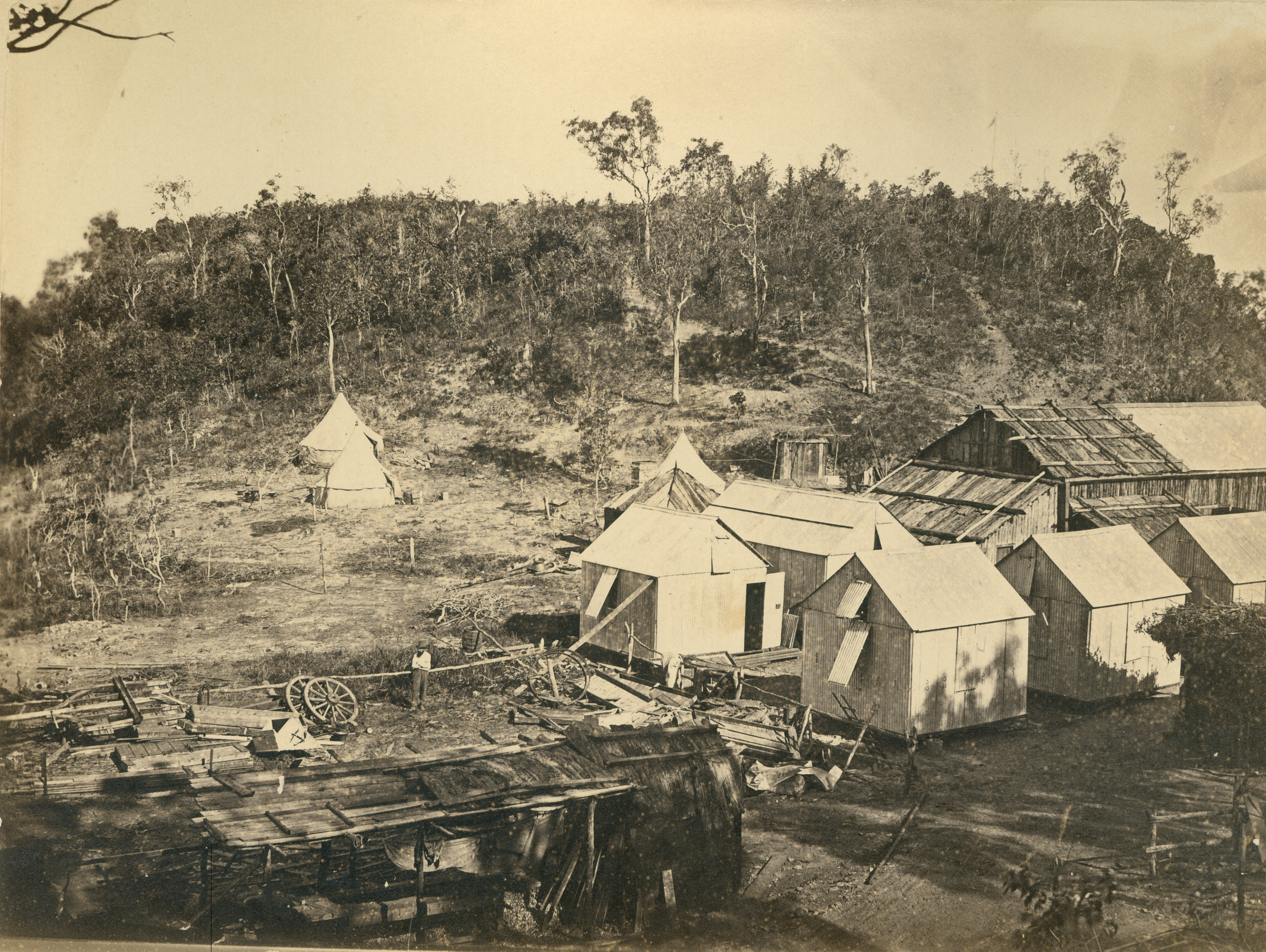
Goyder's survey camp

Fort Hill is a hill that once existed on Darwin Harbour in the Northern Territory of Australia. It was the location of George Goyder's survey camp which was established in 1869.

== Colonial history ==
The hill became the earliest European burial site in Darwin, after the death and burial of John William Ogilvie Bennett, a draughtsman on Goyder's 1869 survey expedition. Bennett was fatally speared by Aboriginal people on the Adelaide River on 24 May 1869, dying four days later. He and a fellow expedition member were attacked at their camp, while compiling an atlas of Wulna place-names. He was buried at a site on the top of Fort Hill. Another early settler Richard Hazard was the next person to be buried there. Hazard died there on 2 August 1869. Their remains were relocated to Darwin Cemetery on McMillians Road in 1965.

During World War II Fort Hill had two oil tunnels bored into the side of the hill.

The hill was removed in 1965 to make way for the iron-ore loading wharf.

== See also ==
- List of mountains of the Northern Territory
