= Victoria Hotel, Darwin =

Tourist attractions in Darwin, Northern Territory

Coordinates: 12°27′43.18″S 130°50′33.43″E

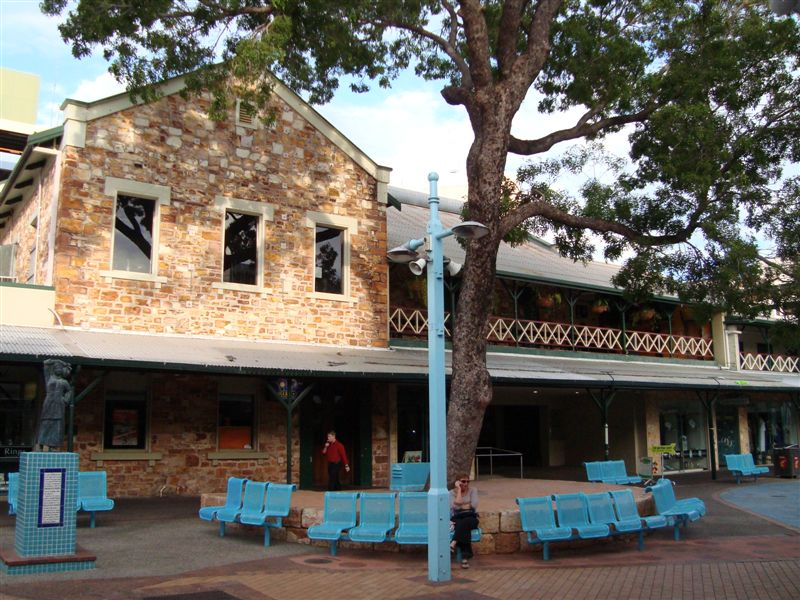
Darwin's Victoria Hotel in 2008.

The Victoria Hotel, or The Vic as it is commonly known, is a heritage listed pub located in Darwin, Northern Territory, Australia. Built in 1890, it is an important historical building but is currently closed.

== History ==
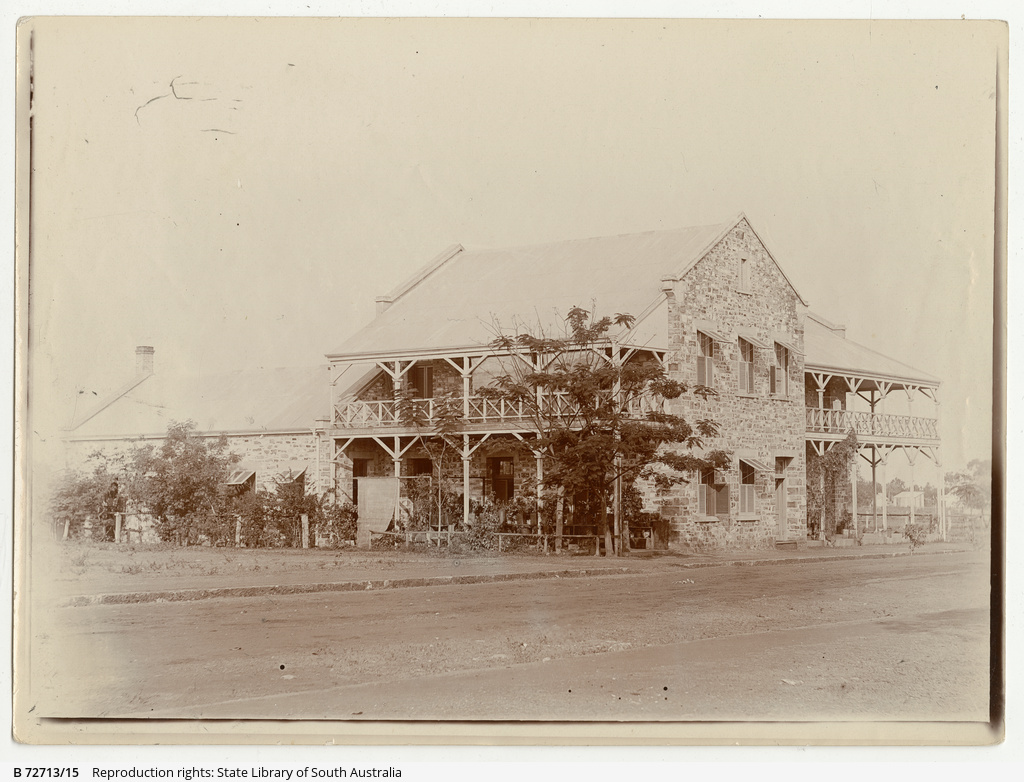
'Hotel Victoria, Palmerston, Northern Territory'

The Victoria Hotel was built by Ellen Ryan, one of the Territory's wealthiest women, who owned land and several mining leases. In 1888 Ryan moved into the Territory hotel trade, lodging a successful application with the licensing board for a prestigious hotel to be built at 27 Smith Street in central Darwin, then known as Palmerston, during the northern Australia gold rushes of the 1870s onwards. Constructed by H.C. Debross, it was built for £4,000 and was the first stone building in Darwin. The two-storey hotel was made of local, multi-coloured porcellanite stone, with a facade dominated by a parapetted gable and verandahs. Upon completion, the building dominated Smith Street and remained that way for over half a century.

The hotel opened on 8 September 1890. It was first called The Royal Hotel but was renamed the North Australian Hotel a few days after opening. It was renamed the Victoria Hotel in 1896.

=== 1897 cyclone ===
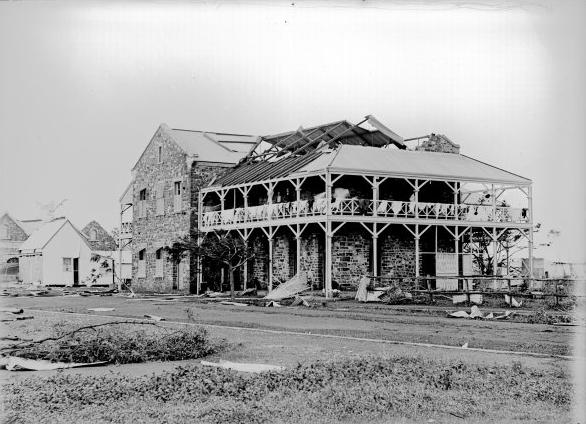
Victoria Hotel after cyclone damage in 1897

The Victoria Hotel lost part of its roof and was damaged internally during a cyclone on 6 January 1897. Known as the "Great Hurricane", it killed 28 people, sank 19 vessels in the harbour including the entire pearling fleet, and caused around £150,000 damage (equivalent to £16,900,000 in 2025) throughout the town. Structurally however, the hotel was one of only a few buildings that remained intact and it was repaired shortly afterwards.

=== Early 20th century ===
In 1908, the hotel accommodated Henry Dutton and Murray Aunger, the first motorists to cross the Australian continent from Adelaide to Darwin.

In 1915, the hotel was one of several to be nationalised by Northern Territory Administrator, John Gilruth. Known as the government take-over, the hotel was the focal point for political turmoil and union unrest between 1911 and 1919, which came to a head on 17 December 1918 in what was known as the Darwin Rebellion.

Ross and Keith Smith and other aviators connected with the air race from England to Australia stayed at the hotel in December 1919.

Mining entrepreneur May Brown became the first publican win the lease on Darwin's Victoria Hotel in 1921 when the era of state control of Top End hotels came to an end. Christina Gordon took over the hotel in August 1926. Gordon upgraded the Vic Hotel including the refurbishment of a new dining room. She continued the connection with aviators. Many of their signatures from the 1920s and 1930s remain on a masonry section in the hotel which has been preserved.

The well-known Government architect Beni Burnett, who had a very significant influence on Darwin architecture from the late 1930s, stayed at the hotel for several years.

=== 1937 cyclone ===
The hotel lost its roof for the second time in March 1937, during another cyclone. Although not as formidable as the 1897 cyclone, it still caused considerable damage to the town and killed one person. The hotel was quickly repaired.

=== World War II ===
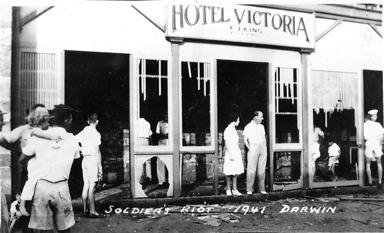
Inspecting the damage following the soldiers riot of September 1941.

During World War II the hotel was occupied by United States and Australian naval authorities who remained there until the end of the war. In September 1941, rioting soldiers in the Darwin city area caused superficial damage to the hotel, such as broken windows and furniture. With many troops stationed in Darwin, a fight broke out in the hotel that quickly spread outside into Smith Street. Although the damage was blamed on the soldiers, records show that civilians were involved in the riot.

On 19 February 1942, Darwin was bombed by Japanese air raids, the largest attacks mounted by a foreign power against Australia. It was the same fleet that had bombed Pearl Harbor, though a considerably larger number of bombs were dropped on Darwin than on Pearl Harbor. The attack killed at least 243 people and caused immense damage to the town. They were the first of many raids on Darwin. Despite this extensive destruction to the town, the Victoria Hotel survived with little damage. Ironically, just as much damage was caused to the hotel by the September 1941 soldiers riot, as the Japanese bombing raids.

In September 1946, the pub reopened under the ownership of the Lim family, who bought the hotel from the Gordons. The Lims operated the hotel for nearly 20 years, selling it in 1965. During this period, the hotel was a popular 'watering hole' frequently attended by crocodile shooters, buffalo hunters and mining prospectors, as well as the local office workers and bank staff.

=== Cyclone Tracy ===
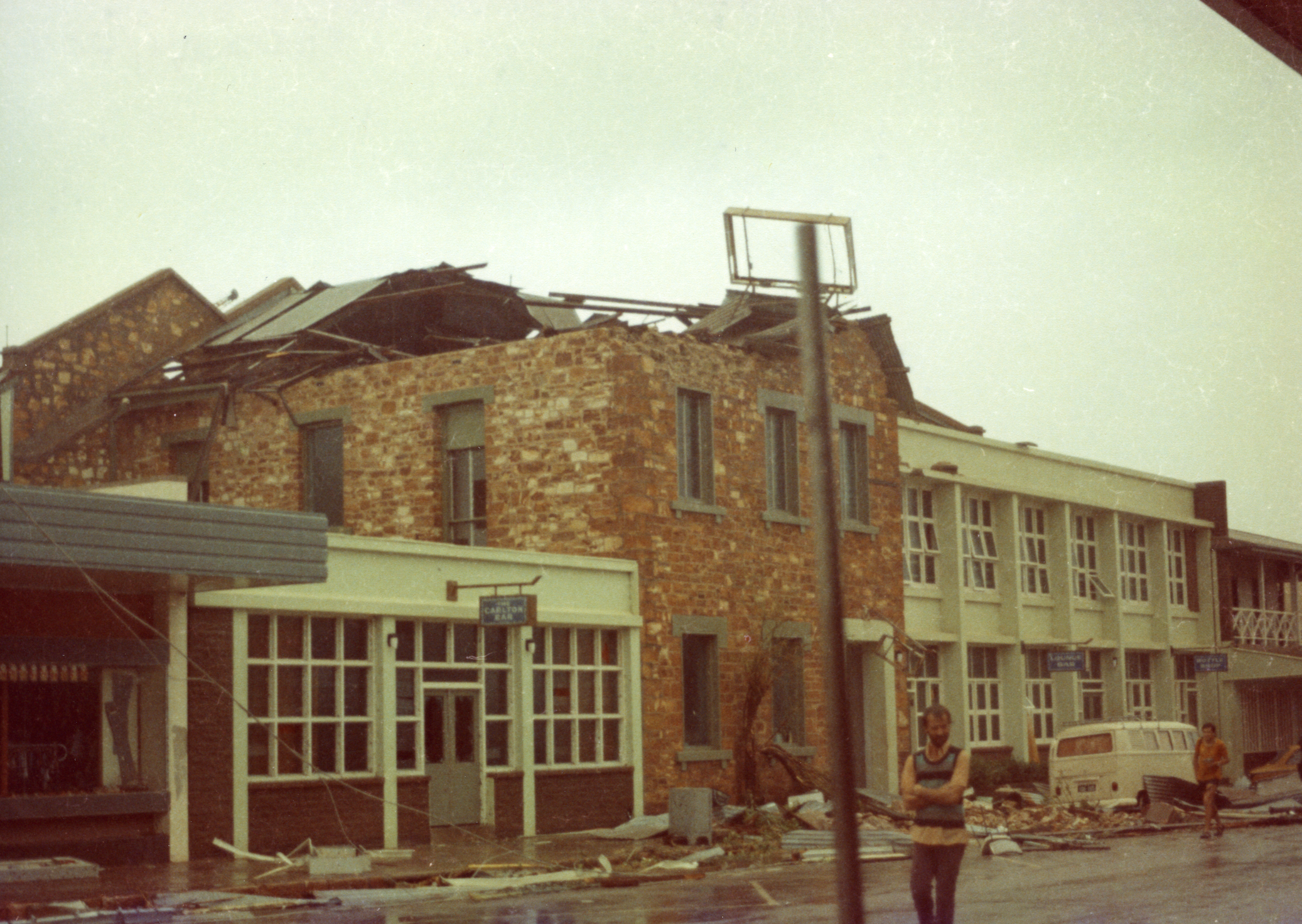
The Hotel Victoria after Cyclone Tracy.

On Christmas Day 1974 the hotel survived yet another cyclone, when Cyclone Tracy hit Darwin killing 71 people and damaging 95 per cent of buildings at an estimated cost of over A$800 million. The hotel was significantly damaged but survived structurally, losing its roof for the third time in less than a century.

The cyclone left Darwin nearly uninhabitable, so the Vic Hotel was not reconstructed until 1978. Some original stonework was repaired at this time, particularly in relation to the Smith Street gabled parapet. Other stonework repairs were minimal as it was still in generally good condition, despite the severity of Cyclone Tracy.

The hotel has had several refurbishments since Cyclone Tracy. The hotel facade was registered on the "National Estate" as a Historic site in 1999 for its historic associations with important events and individuals for more than a century.

== Present day ==
The Vic Hotel closed in October 2014. It was reported to be more than $750,000 in debt. The hotel's co-owner Andrew Chigwidden said that the hotel "struggled to get market share due to its geographical position... a lack of a suitable downstairs smoking area has also had a massive negative commercial impact on the viability (and) the social ambience of the hotel."
