= Mindil Beach =

Beach near Darwin in the Northern Territory of Australia

Coordinates: 12°26′42.18″S 130°49′51.72″E

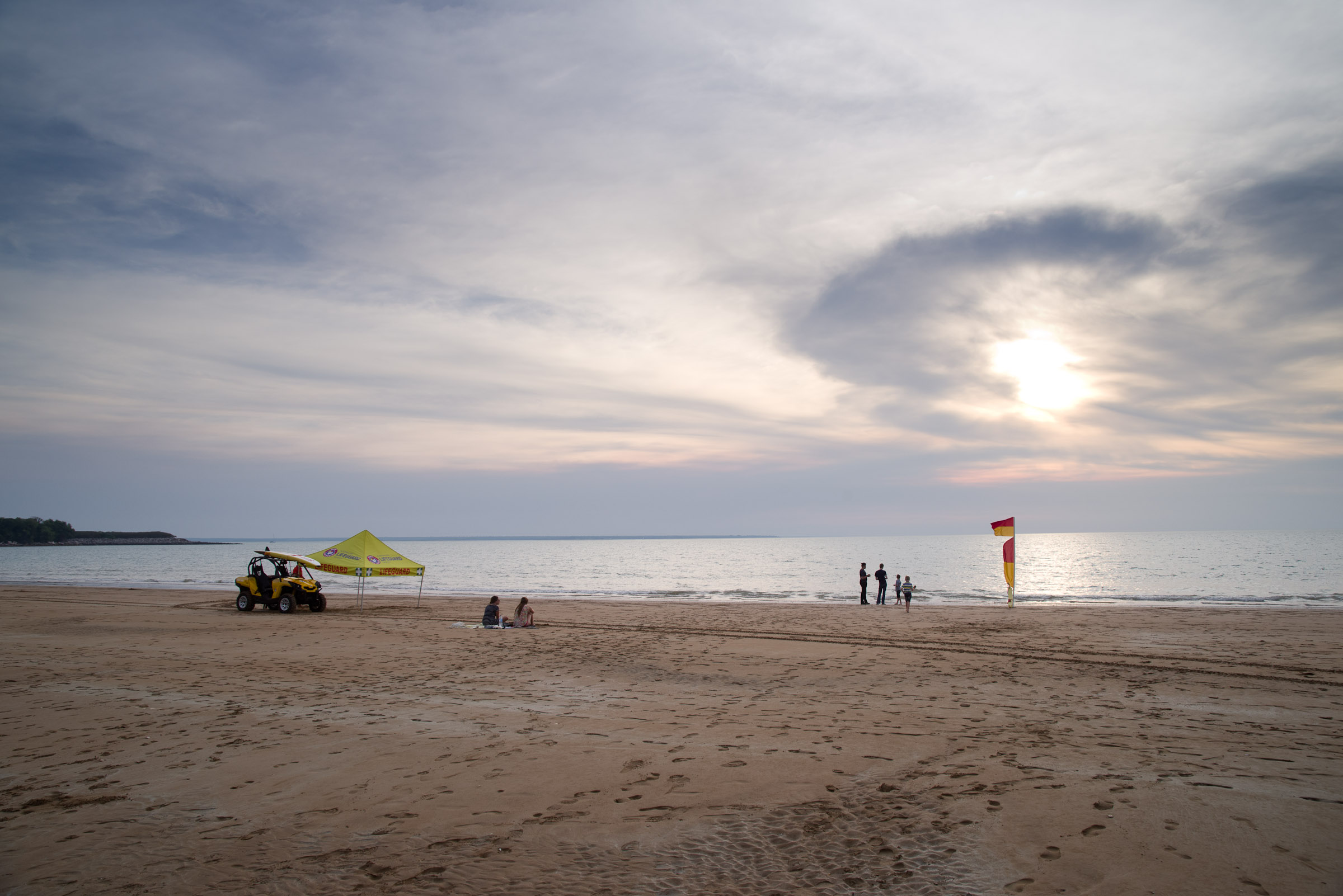
Mindil Beach

Mindil Beach is a beach in the Northern Territory of Australia, located in the suburb of The Gardens, near Darwin's central business district. Mindil Beach holds the Mindil Beach Sunset Markets, which runs during the dry season (from May until October) of every year. These markets are popular with both the locals and tourists alike and can attract thousands of people.

== History ==
When George Goyder surveyed the town of Palmerston, as Darwin was originally known, the name "Mindil" was given and written on maps to the swamp which was behind the town blocks. Rapidly this name came to be applied to the beach in front of the swamp, eventually becoming known as Mindil Beach.

== Events ==
The Darwin beer-can regatta is held at Mindil Beach annually. It has been running since 16 June 1974, when it was won by Kevin Jaques driving a tunnel hull "Pistol Knight" on behalf of the Darwin Power Boat Club.

== Mindil Beach Sunset Market ==
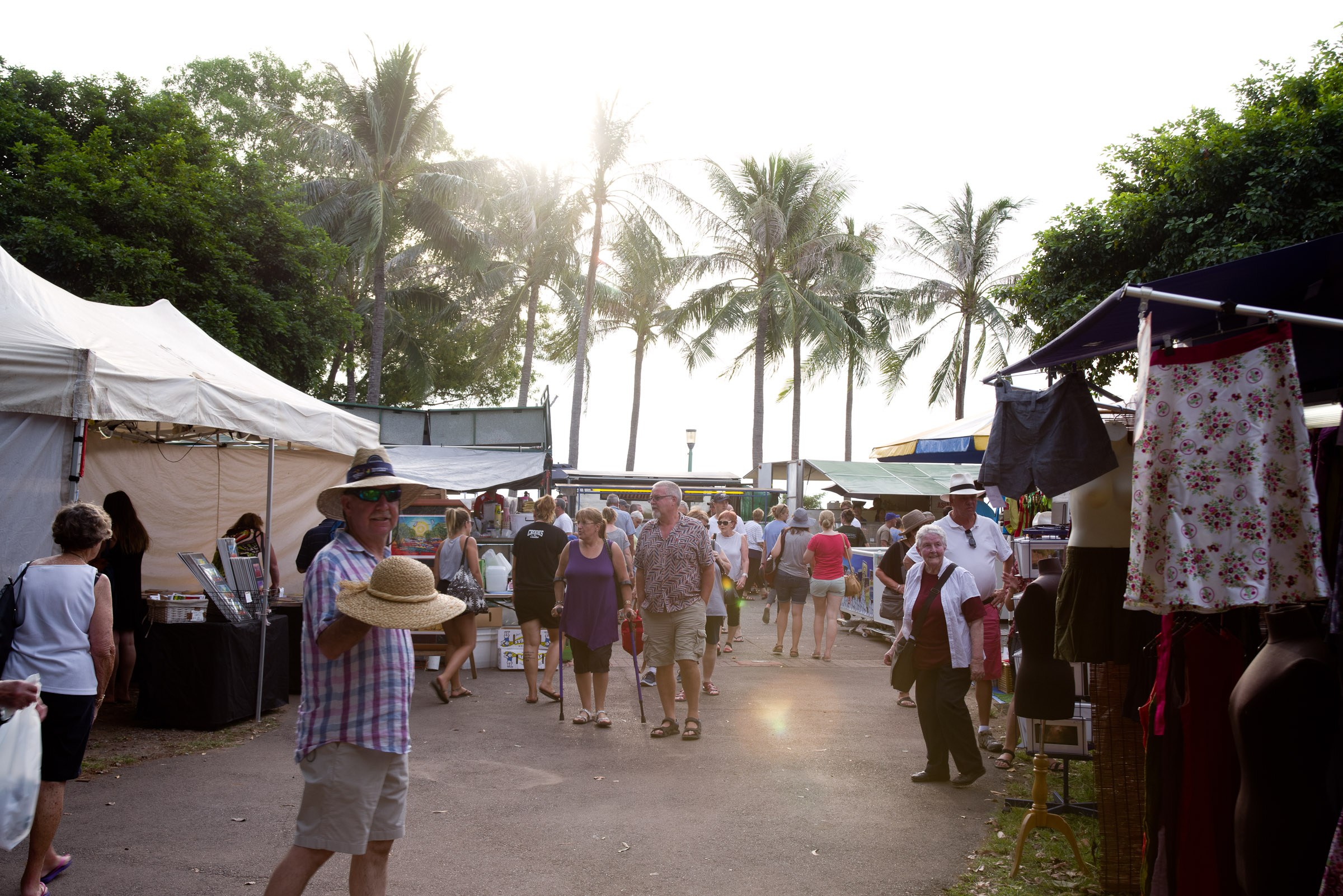
Mindil Beach Markets

The Mindil Beach Sunset Market is a seasonal market held at Mindil Beach. The market started in 1987 in Darwin Mall, but not long afterwards shopkeepers there complained to the council about loss of trade, and the market moved to Mindil Beach.

As of August 2022 the Mindil market contains around 200 stalls, which are open on Thursday and Sunday nights throughout the dry season, that is, late April through to late October. There are about 60 food stalls, along with arts, crafts and various services on offer. Creative and performing artists from Darwin and regional NT show and perform their work.
