= Darwin Rocksitters Club =

Darwin, Northern Territory, Australia club

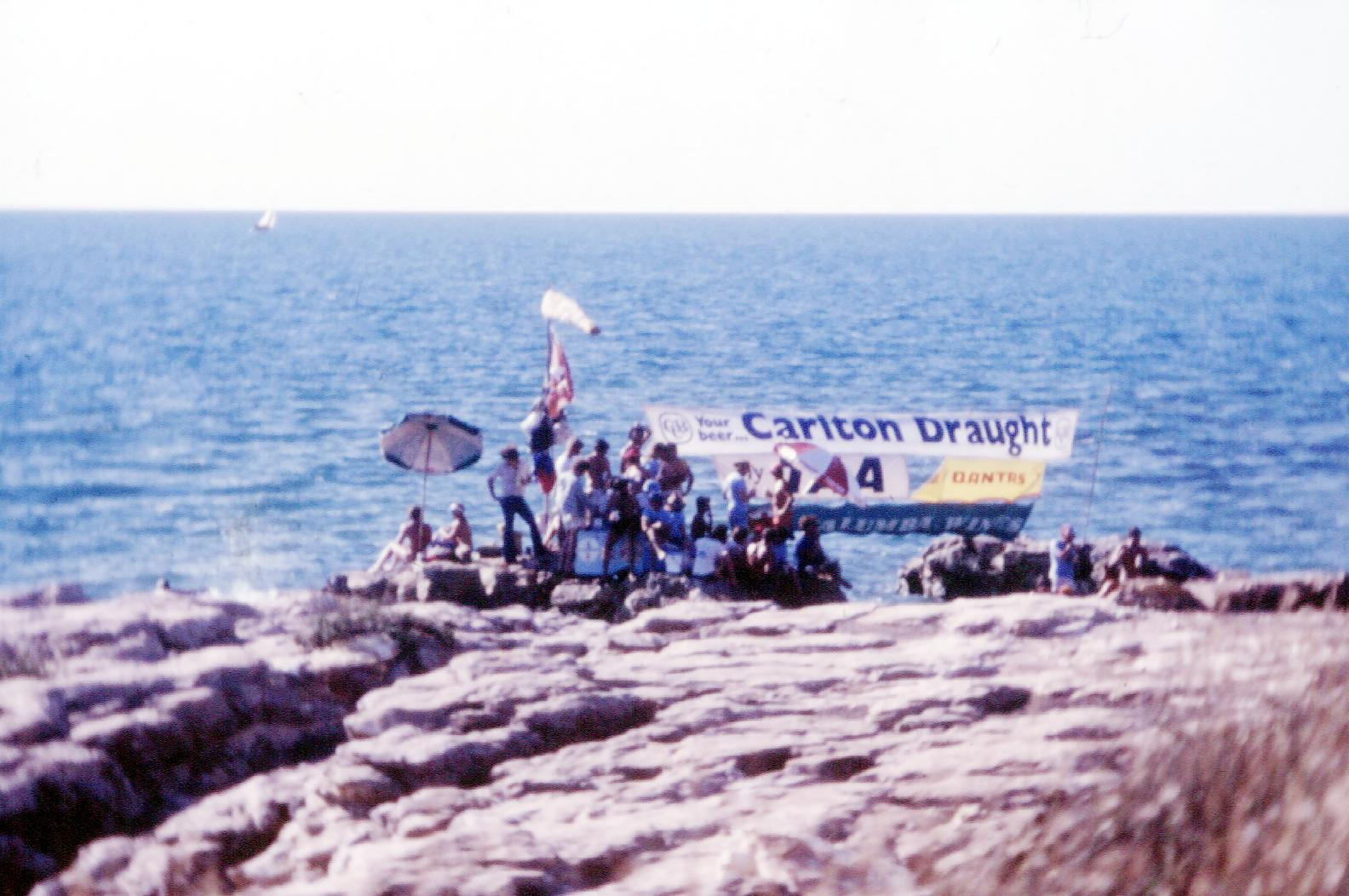
Darwins Rocksitters Club at East Point in 1977

The Darwin Rocksitters Club was a group of Australians that sat on a rock for days at a time to drink beer together, a practice they called "rocksitting". Founded in 1974 in Darwin, Northern Territory, the Darwin Rocksitters Club was awarded a world record in 1978 for the longest rocksit of 8 days, and later achieved a new record of 12 days in 1980. Rocksitting declined shortly after this due to the enforcement of public drinking laws.

== History ==
The Darwin Rocksitters Club formed in 1974 after group of journalists gathered on the cliffs at East Point on a Saturday afternoon to drink beer, tell stories, and watch the sunset. This soon became a regular event and the club began to meet every Saturday. One of the members of the club, Robin Davy, said of it:

You have to remember, in those days Darwin was smaller, nobody was watching TV, no iPhones, none of that. We had to make fun and that was the way we did it.

— Robin Davy, ABC Radio Darwin, 2018

The group grew rapidly and published a list of Official Rules for a Rock-sit-athon and the first rule was "there shall be no funny business on The Rock". The third, fifth, seventh and twelfth rules were simply "[n]o funny business".

In 1977, the group attempted to break the world record by sitting for five days; their success was ignored by an official record-keeping company for drinking too much beer. Other rock sitting clubs emerged around this time, and the Parua Bay Sitters in New Zealand soon broke Darwin’s unrecognised record when they sat for six days.

Darwin won the title back with an eight-day sit in October 1978, which was run to commemorate the passing of the Northern Territory (Self-Government) Act 1978, and the new Northern Territory flag was raised. Several other marathon sits were conducted, often to raise money for charity. These included a 12-day world record that was set in 1980, although this was jeopardised on the 11th day when an official complaint was made to the Northern Territory Police Commissioner concerning drinking in a public space, prompting police to visit the sitters and take the names of all people sitting at or visiting the rock. Also in 1980 the rocksitters held their first sit on the inaugural flight from Sydney to Los Angeles and also held a sit on Uluru.

Two popular stories of the rocksitters are that two people once met at the rock and went on to get married and that many other former sitters have had their ashes scattered on the rock. Rocksitting declined with the enforcement of public drinking laws. The club was debated in the Northern Territory Legislative Assembly in 1978, with concerns being raised that the club (and events like the Darwin Beer Can Regatta) were affecting the Northern Territory's image in the rest of Australia, and that "down south many people think Territorians to be backward, drunken country hicks".

A memorial plaque to the Darwin Rocksitters Club was first put in place at East Point in 1987 by foundation member Beat Erismann (photographer) in honour of their 10th anniversary. This was later damaged and replaced in 2001. In the 1980s, the original rocks used by the club were broken up by a lightning strike and further damage was done to the remaining rocks during heavy swells in 2012. Their 40th anniversary was celebrated in 2017.

In May 2024 members of the Darwin Rocksitters club met in Darwin to celebrate their 50th anniversary and at the meet up former Northern Territory politician Dawn Lawrie said that: "[w]hen I was a member in parliament … I wanted to find people who were kind, articulate, intelligent and charming and I found the Rocksitters".

Rocksitters at East Point (Darwin) in 1977

Rocksitters from the Darwin Rocksitters Club in 1978

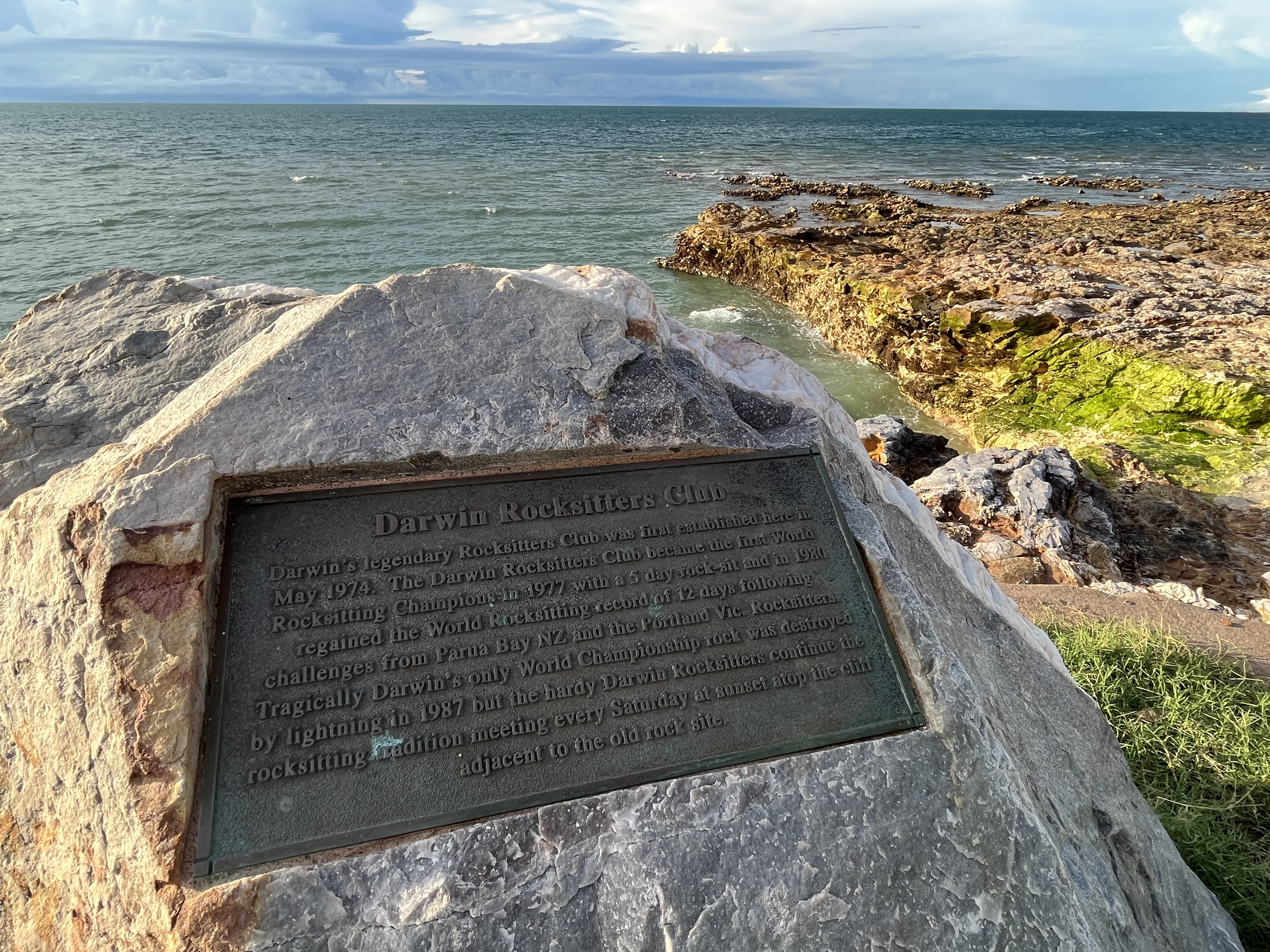
Darwin Rocksitters Club Memorial Plaque, April 2024

== See also ==
- Bruces sketch, a Monty Python skit which parodies Australian manners and lists similar rules
