= Darwin oil storage tunnels =

Historic oil storage tunnels in Darwin, Australia

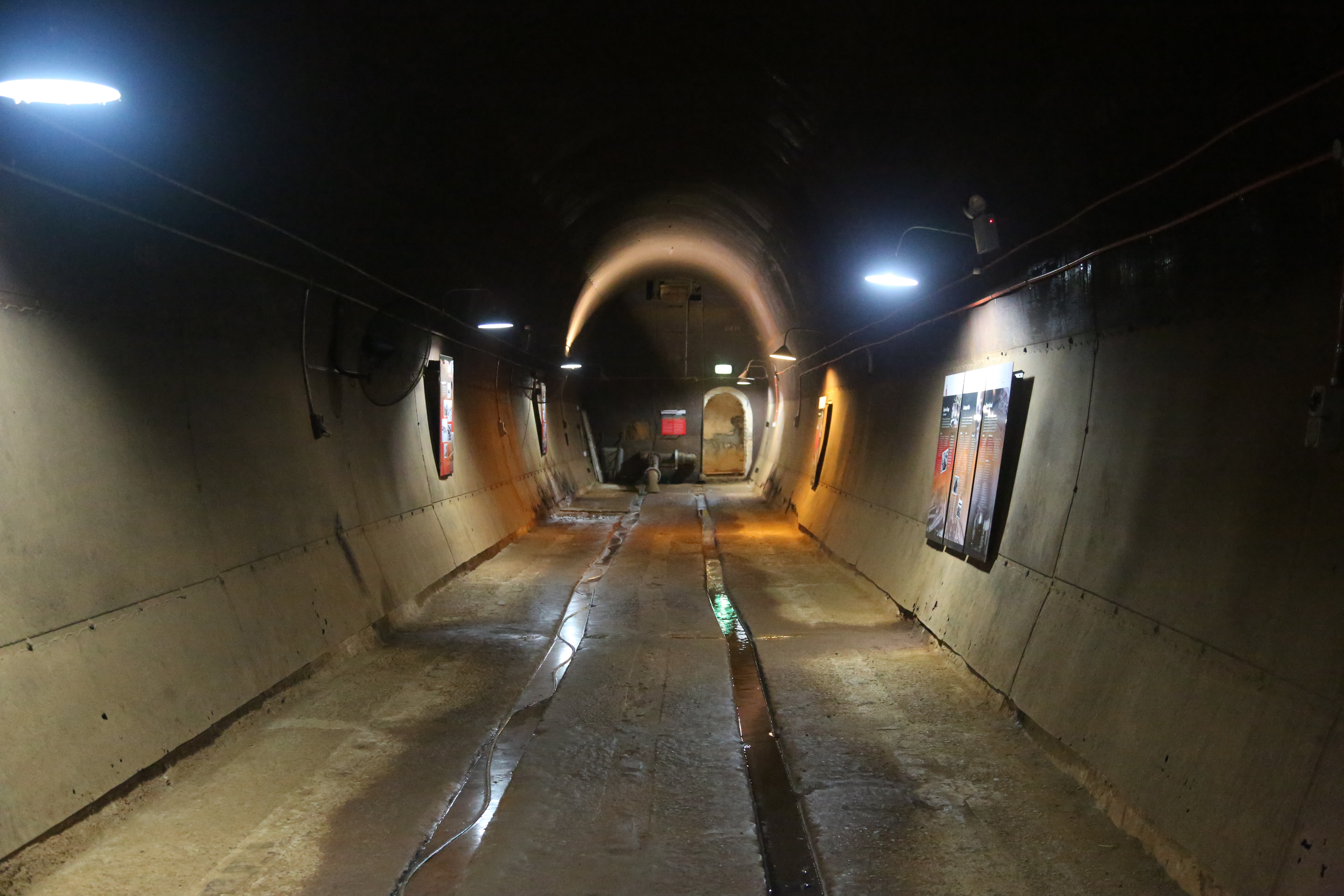
Darwin Oil Storage Tunnels in 2016

The Darwin oil storage tunnels were built during World War II to protect the oil stored in the Australian city of Darwin from Japanese bombing. They are below the cliffs of Darwin City in the Darwin Wharf Precinct on Kitchener Drive, a part of the Waterfront Precinct. By the time the tunnels were completed the risk from bombing had gone and the tunnels never stored oil.

Today tunnel 5 and 6 are open for visitors.

== History ==
In 1942, 11 above ground oil storage tanks were built on Stokes Hill. Japanese air-raids on 19 February, 16 March and 16 June 1942 destroyed 7 of the 11 tanks. Following the destruction of the above ground oil tanks, it was decided that a bomb proof option was needed for the storage of oil. The Allied Works Council was directed by The War Cabinet to investigate the possibility of underground tanks. In May 1942, the original consignment was for the Civil Construction Corps to build 11 tunnels at a cost of 220,000 pounds to hold 20,000 tonnes of oil. In April 1943, George Fisher was appointed Engineer-in-Charge of the secret project, known at the time as "The Safe Oil Storage". Not long after the construction of the tunnels started by 400 men. In 1943 the project funding rose from 220,000 to 850,000 to speed the completion of the project.

When peace was declared in 1945, six of the storage tunnels had been completed. The tunnels interiors are horseshoe shaped in cross-section, concrete formed and steel lined. They have an internal width of 4.5 metres and a height of 5.4 metres. The tunnels were numbered 1, 5, 6, 10 and 11 with tunnel 3 located in Fort Hill which is now non-existent. The numbering of the tunnels suggest that a total of 11 tunnels were planned.

	Tunnel 1	Tunnel 5	Tunnel 6	Tunnel 10	Tunnel 11
Main Storage tank length	116 m	172 m	77 m	184 m	124 m
Entrance tunnel length	51 m	42 m and 8 m	39.6 m	30 m	10 m
Working Space	4 m	4 m	N/A	N/A	5m
Pump chamber length	N/A	N/A	8 m	16 m	N/A

Confrontation with Indonesia in the 1950s saw a need for the storage of jet fuel for RAF and RAAF bombers. The jet fuel was stored in tunnel 5 and 6 for 3 years.

In the 1970s and 80's the Fire Brigade used the tunnels for training purposes by filling them with smoke.

== Present Day ==
The tunnels were opened to the public on 19 February 1992 to commemorate the 50th anniversary of the Bombing of Darwin.
