= May Brown =

May Brown (24 May 1875 – c. 1939) was a flamboyant Northern Territory miner, publican and pioneer, who became well known her role in developing the wolfram (tungsten) mining industry in Australia. She was known as "The Wolfram Queen".

== Early life ==
Brown was born in Sydney on 24 May 1875, the sixth of seven children. She was the daughter of Charles James Weedon (aka Wheedon) (1835–1892) and his wife, Mary (née Maria Santa Fortunata Chiodetti) (1842–1932), daughter of composer and music professor Vincenzo Rafael Eustachio Chiodetti (1788–1858), a native of Rome, Italy and bandmaster to Her Majesty's 28th Regiment, who had emigrated to Australia in 1836. Among her siblings were brothers Sydney and Percy, and a sister, Florence Alice Weedon Budgen Davies (1868–1960), who had been launched into the hotel business and became a publican, with her first husband, Sydney Budgen, before she was even 18.

Brown married rower, cricketer, footballer, and New South Wales amateur boxing champion George Seale whose brothers, Joe and Ted, were also professional cricket players.

George Seale was lauded as "the best all-round amateur athlete in Australia," and as one of the best amateur boxers in the world, as well as for successfully running the Sydney Gymnastics Club on Castlereagh Street in Sydney, until his death in March 1906.

Six months after Seale's death, Brown married Northern Territory wolfram miner James Burns and moved with him to the Northern Territory. They had one son George Seal Junior. George Junior's daughter, born 10 May 1926, became renowned nurse, educator and writer Jacqueline "Jaci" Moya Seale O'Brien, AC, who was made a Companion of the Order of Australia in 1984 for her decades of service to nursing.

== Life in the Northern Territory ==
Brown settled with her new husband in Pine Creek, near his mine, The Crest of the Wave. Burns also owned another nearby mine, Wolfram Creek. She was soon deeply involved in working the mines herself, alongside local Chinese miners. A skilled miner, a newspaper report described that she had "shown unbounded faith in the mine since first becoming interested in it." In 1909, malaria hit the area and Brown nursed the miners, later contracting malaria herself. James Burns died in 1912 and the mine was put into administration while the estate was administered. Operations restarted after title was transferred to Brown and her third husband Charles Albert (Bert) Brown, to whom she was married in 1913.

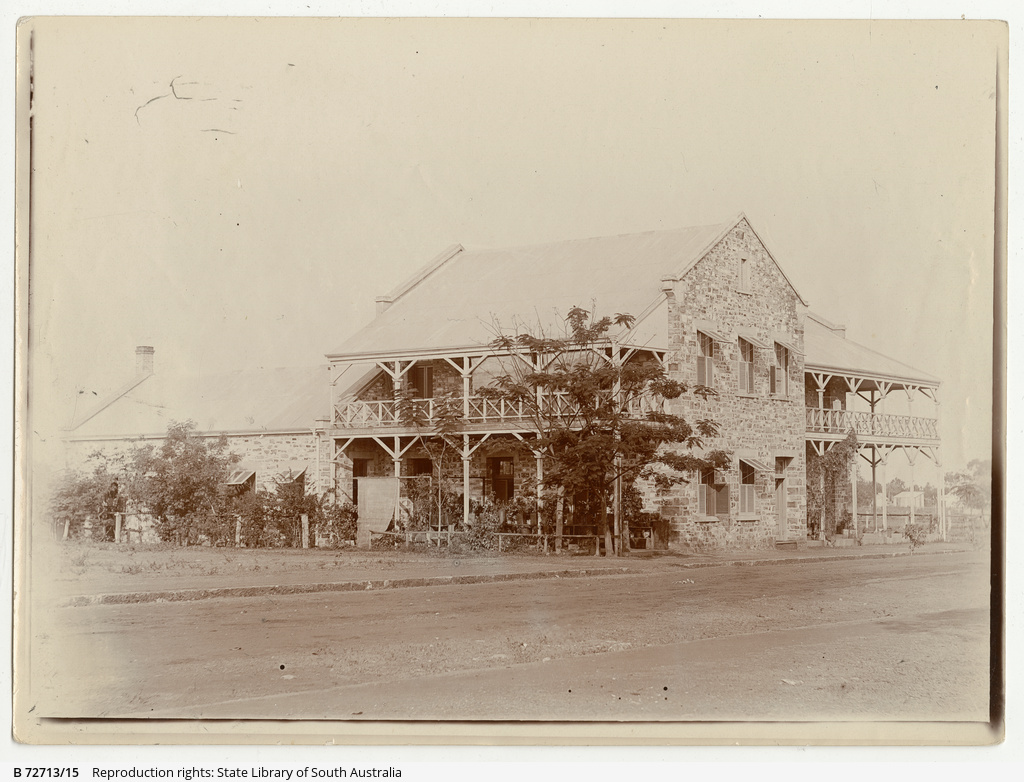
Victoria Hotel in Darwin

When the wolfram price plummeted at the end of World War I, Brown moved to diversify her business by investing the hotel business. She became the first publican win the lease on Darwin’s Victoria Hotel in 1921 when the era of state control of Top End hotels came to an end. As a publican she built a reputation for clearing the pub of problem drinkers by using the boxing skills taught to her by her first husband, boxing champion and self-defense enthusiast George Seale.

Her hotel business was very successful. After her third husband, Charles Albert, died from malaria while droving cattle along the Birdsville Track in 1926, she bought the Pine Creek Hotel and managed it from 1928 to 1930.

Brown became one of the Northern Territory’s richest people who "spent her money recklessly and gave it away liberally." Brown was a popular figure who became even more popular for occasionally throwing gold sovereigns and banknotes into the air as she walked down Darwin’s streets, shouting "Let catch as catch can!" Brown's lifestyle took its toll, however, and she began experiencing financial trouble, eventually forfeiting both her Wolfram Hill and Crest of the Wave mines in 1934. But her spirited nature was still in evidence when she was reported to be in a scuffle with another woman at Darwin's Star Theatre.

Brown retired to Sydney and died there on 23 July 1939, "a virtual pauper." She is buried with her first husband at Rookwood cemetery in Sydney.

== Sources ==
- Northern Territory Dictionary of Biography, (PDF, revised) Volumes 1 - 3, Carment, David, et al, Editors, Charles Darwin University Press, 2008, pages 66-67, 77-78 and 437 - 438.
