= Darwin Waterfront Precinct =

Tourist area in the Northern Territory, Australia

- Local government area
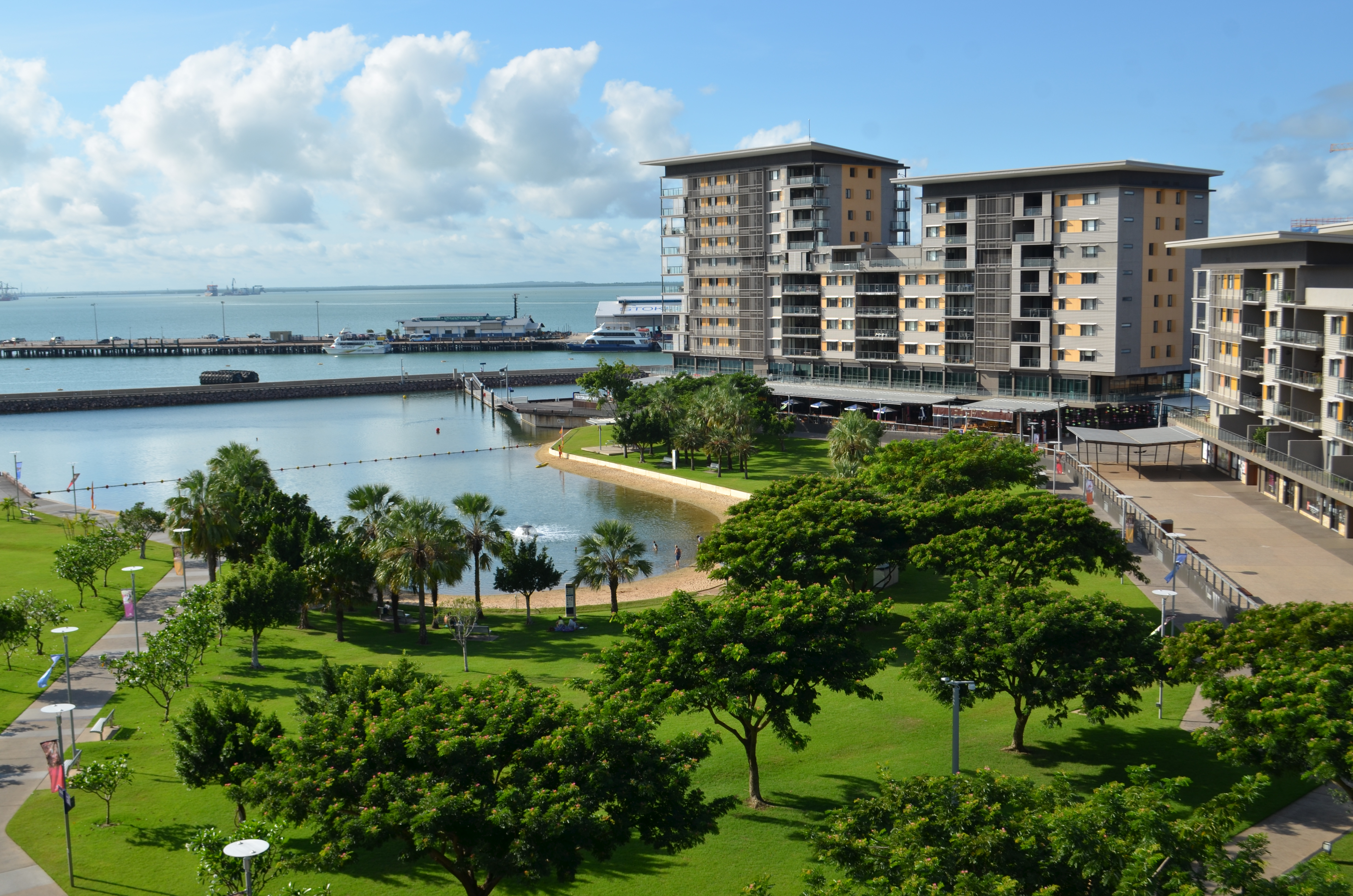
- Interactive map of Darwin Waterfront Precinct
- Country: Australia
- State: Northern Territory
- Region: Metropolitan Darwin
- Established: 2006

Government
  - Territory electorate: Port Darwin
  - Federal division: Solomon

Population
  - Total: 293 (2021)
- Website: Darwin Waterfront Precinct

The Darwin Waterfront Precinct is a tourist area in the Northern Territory of Australia in Darwin City. Restaurants, bars, a wave pool and a man-made beach are available for local community and tourists. It is located five minutes’ walk from the Darwin Central Business District (CBD).

== Location/Geography ==
The Darwin Waterfront Precinct is located on Wharf One and Two on the southern end of Darwin City.

== History ==
The Waterfront Precinct is built on reclaimed land from Kitchener Bay between Stokes Hill and Fort Hill (which has since been removed).

The Darwin Oil Storage Tunnels were built during World War II to protect the navy's oil from Japanese attacks. Two of these tunnels are now open to the public.

== Darwin Waterfront Corporation ==
The Darwin Waterfront Precinct is managed by the Darwin Waterfront Corporation, a corporation created by Act of Parliament in 2006. Its role is to manage and promote the precinct. The corporation also responsible for the provision of municipal services to the precinct.

== Tourist Attractions ==
- Waterfront Lagoon
- Goyder Park
- Deckchair Cinema
- Darwin Wave Pool
- Darwin Convention Centre
- Restaurants, shops and apartments
