= Stokes Hill Wharf =

Coordinates: 12°28′15″S 130°50′54″E

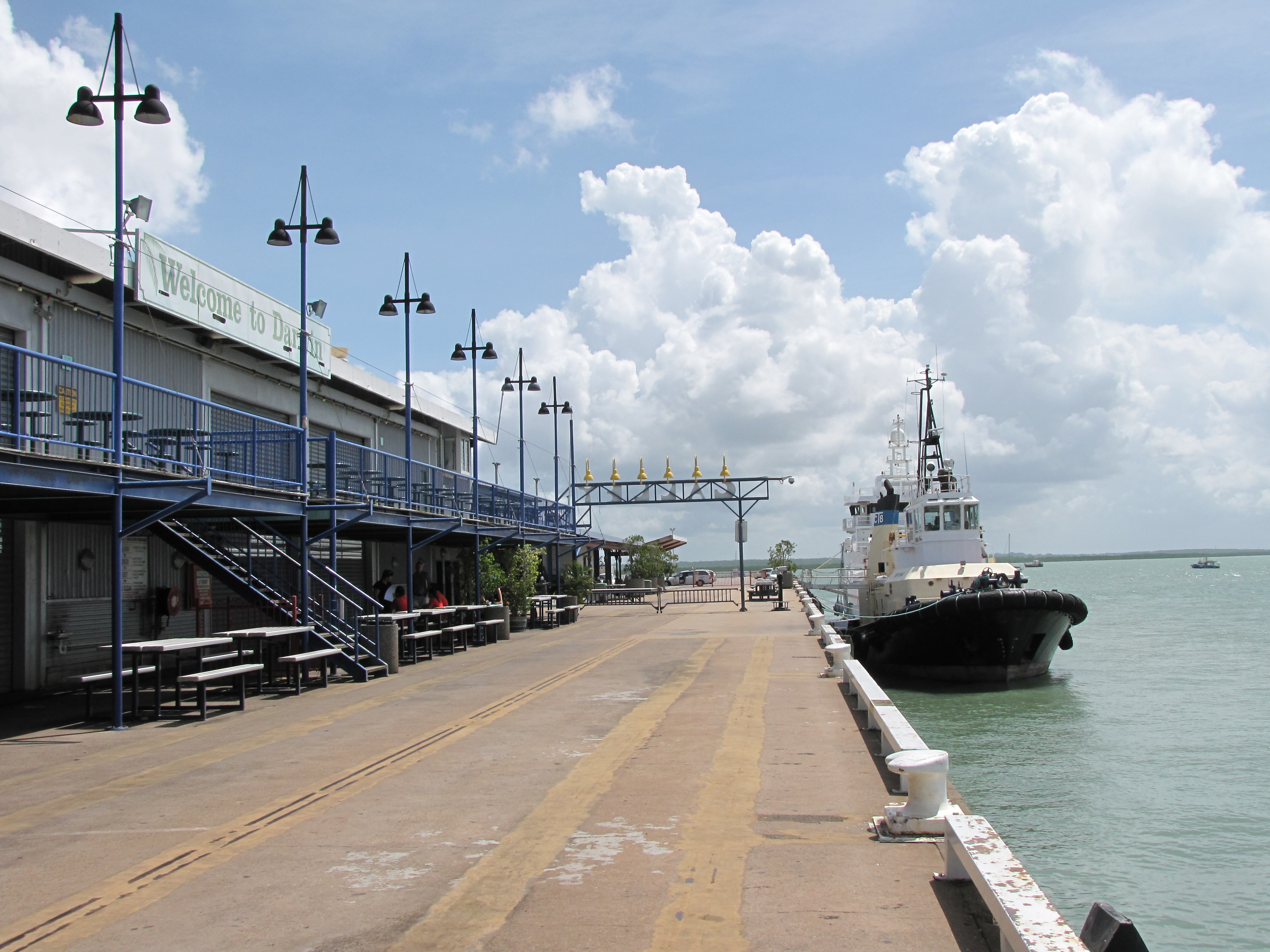
Darwin's Stokes Hill Wharf

Stokes Hill Wharf is the main wharf for the city of Darwin in the Northern Territory of Australia and is named after Stokes Hill, adjacent. The hill itself was named in 1839 by the commander of HMS Beagle, after its previous commander, Captain Pringle Stokes.

Another possible source is the unrelated John Lort Stokes, who was mate and assistant surveyor aboard Beagle under Captain Robert Fitzroy, R.N., 1831–1836 when Charles Darwin was a paying passenger, sharing Stokes' cabin. Darwin Harbour was named in 1839 by Lieutenant Stokes and Mr. Forsyth after their old friend and shipmate. Stokes and (ship's mate) C. C. Forsyth had taken the ship's boat to make a closer examination of the harbour.

== History ==
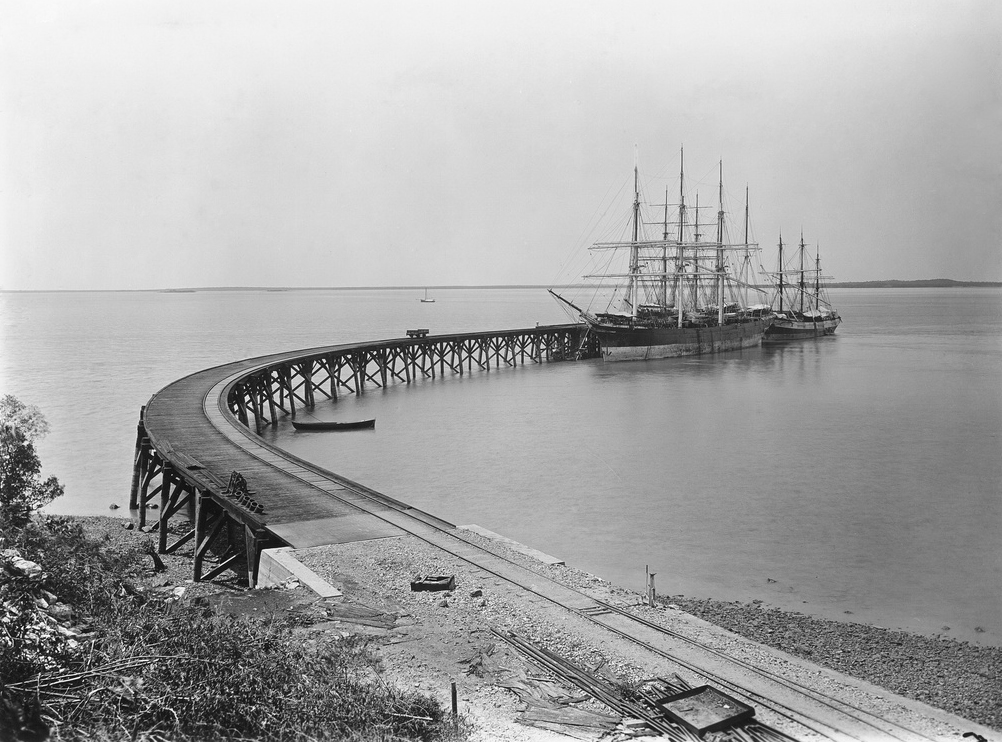
Stokes Hill Wharf in 1887

=== Larrakia sacred site ===
The Larrakia people were the first people to live in this area and believe “Stokes Hill” to have a Larrakia spiritual ancestor living inside it. This ancestor is known as “Chinute Chinute” and is said to manifest itself from time to time as a tawny frogmouth. The hill is a registered Aboriginal sacred site, and is protected by Larrakia traditional owners of the Greater Darwin Region, with the assistance of the Aboriginal Areas Protection Authority. No development, ground disturbing activities, or work is allowed within the sacred site boundaries.

=== First wharf ===
The first wharf built in 1885-86 was called the Port Darwin Jetty or Railway Jetty and was made of timber. The railway connecting Palmerston, the previous name for Darwin, to Pine Creek ran onto the wharf. A small steam engine, known as the "Sandfly", was used to shunt rail stock the length of the jetty. The jetty was closed in 1897 owing to the danger of collapse. The cyclone of 1897 and being eaten away by teredo navalis, a salt water clam also known as the naval shipworm, eventually caused the jetty to collapse that year.

=== Second wharf ===
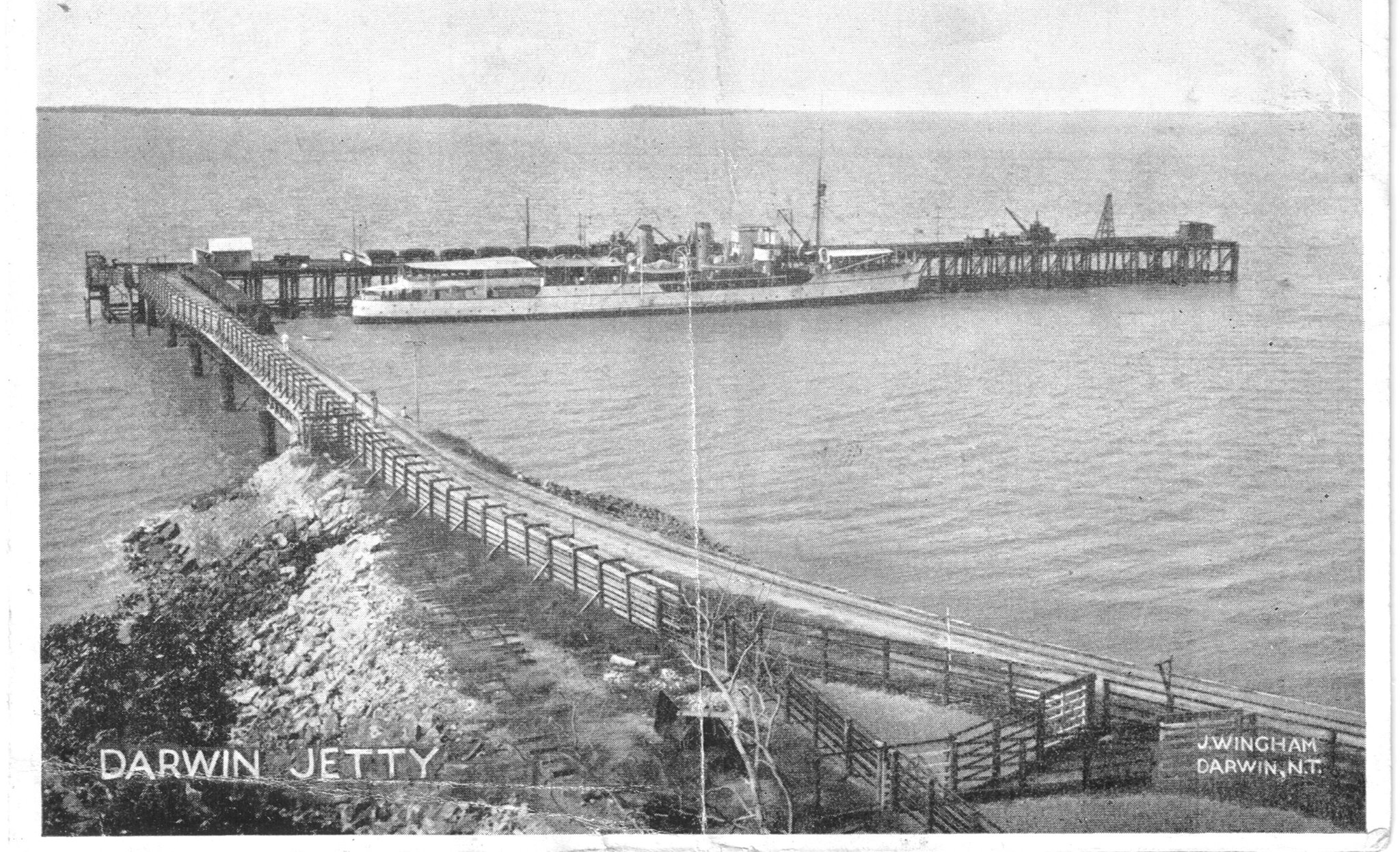
Stokes Hill Wharf in the 1920s

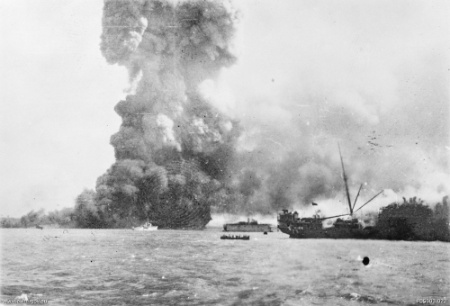
Neptuna explosion at Stokes Hill Wharf on 19 February 1942

The second wharf was built in 1903 and was called the Town Wharf. This was made of cast iron and concrete piers with wooden decking on top. It was built in the shape of an L which caused problems with loading and unloading as railway carts had to be turned on a turntable. In 1922, a rail track along the bridge section was replaced by a cattle race to facilitate live exports. During the 1930s, a small side jetty was built and used as a flying boat terminal. This wharf was damaged in the first Japanese bombing raid on the 19 February 1942 and part of the bridge section was destroyed. Army engineers built a temporary bridge to enable loading to continue.

=== Third wharf ===
The third wharf, which is the current wharf, was built and completed in 1956 and was the main wharf for Darwin until the Darwin Port at East Arm was completed in 2000. This wharf was built of steel and concrete with timber decking. The wharf is mainly used as a venue for restaurants and for small boats to tie up alongside.

The wharf was used in 2008 for the filming of the movie Australia, with a bus used to ferry tourists past the filming.

In 2015, the wharf was used for the final stage of a reenactment of Australian Victorian Cross recipient Albert Borella's journey from Tennant Creek to Darwin en route to enlist in World War I.
