= Hotel Darwin =

Hotel in Northern Territory, Australia

Coordinates: 12.465814°S 130.840987°E

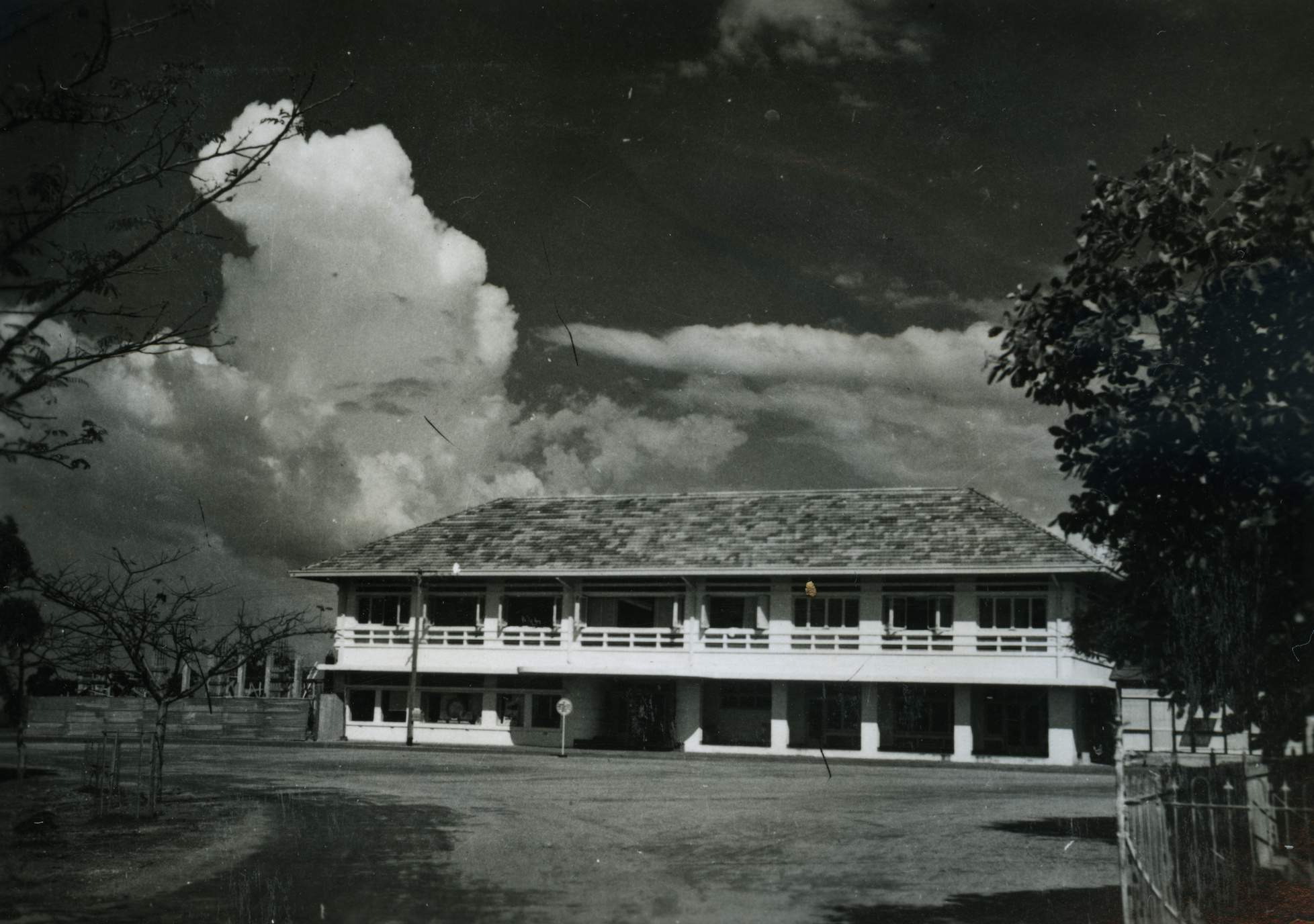
Hotel Darwin, 1941

Hotel Darwin was a hotel located on the Esplanade in central Darwin in the Northern Territory of Australia. It was commonly known as the "Grand Old Duchess". Despite surviving the Bombing of Darwin and Cyclone Tracy, the hotel was demolished in 1999. A bar at the rear of the original site formerly known as the Hot & Cold Bar now functions under the name Hotel Darwin.

== History ==
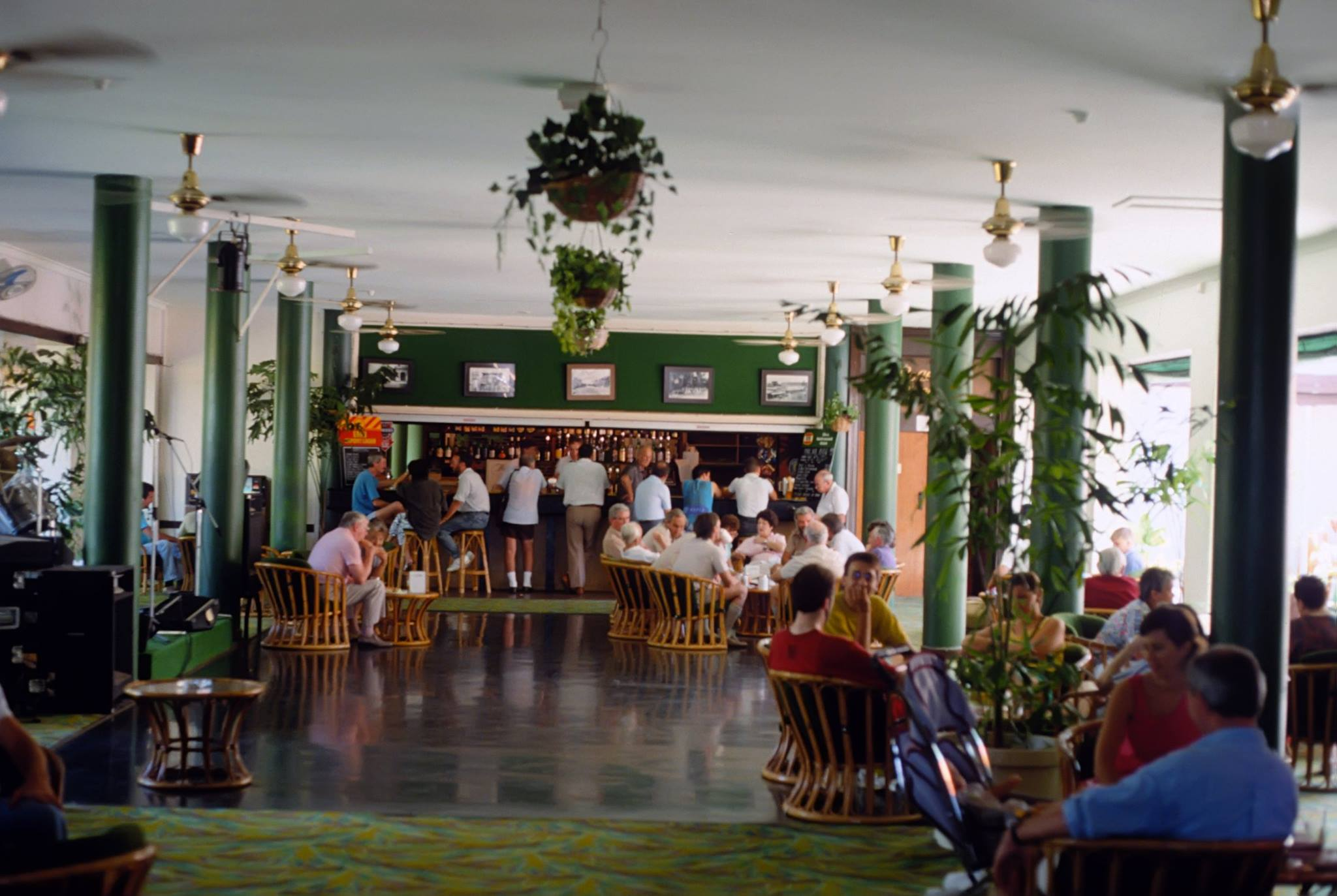
The Green Room at the Hotel Darwin

The Hotel Darwin was designed by D. K. Turner of Messrs. Stephenson and Turner. It was built on the site of the old Club Hotel at a cost of between £50,000 and £85,000. Two hundred people attended the opening of the hotel, which was officiated by Northern Territory Administrator Charles Aubrey Abbott. His wife Hilda Abbott opened the doors with a golden key, which is now on display at the Defence of Darwin Experience. Controversy erupted when several prominent Darwin figures did not receive an invitation. This was described as:

a very serious matter. These influential men might think that they have been deliberately ignored... the Post Office official cannot be too severely censured for their negligence.

In 1947, the Communist Party petitioned to turn the Hotel Darwin into a community hotel, which was signed by more than 300 people. Paspalis and Stanley Thomas Laurance were successful in their tender for the hotel. In 1948, Lawrance was charged for failing to display a price list. The publican stopped serving beer while the case was before the courts, a period in the hotel's history described as "beerless, cheerless days".

The Hotel Darwin featured 'The Pickled Parrot', a piano bar and a fine dining restaurant called 'The Green Room'.

== Demolition ==
By the 1990s, the Hotel Darwin reportedly was "riddled with cancer" and was "structurally unsafe". The owners, Paspalis Hotel Investment group, announced their intention to demolish it on 9 September 1999 after receiving two reports "confirming serious doubts about the structural integrity of the building". The National Trust of the NT called for Planning Minister Tim Baldwin to intervene through use of the Heritage Conservation Act. A Supreme Court injunction on 10 September failed to stop the building's destruction, which began almost immediately after the ruling. Outraged protesters tried to save the hotel and police tried to defuse the situation. By the morning of 11 September the Hotel Darwin had been demolished in what was seen by many as an act of vandalism.
