= February 1942 =

Month of 1942

<<	February 1942					>>
Su	Mo	Tu	We	Th	Fr	Sa
1	2	3	4	5	6	7
8	9	10	11	12	13	14
15	16	17	18	19	20	21
22	23	24	25	26	27	28

The following events occurred in February 1942:

== February 1, 1942 (Sunday) ==
- Marshalls-Gilberts raids
- Vidkun Quisling took office as Minister President of Norway.
- Neil Ritchie ordered a general withdrawal of British forces to the Gazala Line to avoid being encircled.
- The Germans switched their naval codes from Hydra to the more complex Triton.
- National Freedom Day was observed for the first time in the United States, commemorating Abraham Lincoln's signing of the Thirteenth Amendment to the U.S. Constitution on February 1, 1865.
- Presidential elections were held in Chile, won by Juan Antonio Ríos of the Radical Party.
- Born:
  - Bibi Besch, actress, in Vienna, Austria (d. 1996);
  - Terry Jones, actor, comedian, writer and member of the Monty Python comedy troupe, in Colwyn Bay, Wales (d. 2020)

== February 2, 1942 (Monday) ==
- Joseph Stilwell was designated Chief of Staff to Supreme Commander, China Theater, and was directed to "increase the effectiveness of United States assistance to the Chinese government for the prosecution of the war and to assist in improving the combat efficiency of the Chinese Army."
- German submarine U-581 was sunk in the mid-Atlantic Ocean by depth charges from the British destroyer HMS Westcott.
- United States tanker W. L. Steed was torpedoed, shelled and eventually sunk about 80 to 90 nautical miles (150 to 170 km) east of the mouth of Delaware River by German submarine U-103.
- U.S. President Franklin D. Roosevelt asked Congress to approve a $500 million loan to China.
- The drama film Kings Row starring Ann Sheridan, Robert Cummings and Ronald Reagan premiered in New York City.
- Born: Graham Nash, rock and folk singer and songwriter (The Hollies, Crosby, Stills, Nash & Young), in Blackpool, Lancashire, England
- Died:
  - Leonetto Cappiello, 66, Italian-born French poster art designer;
  - Daniil Kharms, 36, Soviet poet, writer and dramatist (died in his psychiatric ward cell during the Siege of Leningrad)

== February 3, 1942 (Tuesday) ==
- The Battle of Port Moresby began over Port Moresby, Papua.
- The Battle of Ambon ended in Japanese victory.
- Erwin Rommel's forces captured Timimi in Libya. The British Eighth Army fell back and began establishing what would soon be known as the Gazala Line.
- The British cargo liner Talthybius was bombed and sunk at Singapore by Japanese aircraft. She was later salvaged and put back into service as Taruyasu Maru.
- The British government set maximum prices for clothing. A suit could not be sold for more than £4 18s 8d.
- German submarine U-165 was commissioned.
- Died: Rolf Kaldrack, 28, German fighter ace (killed in action south of Toropets)

== February 4, 1942 (Wednesday) ==
- The Battle of Makassar Strait was fought, resulting in Japanese victory.
- Erwin Rommel's forces entered Derna, Libya.
- The U.K. Ministry of War Production was created and Lord Beaverbrook was appointed its first head.
- German submarine U-258 was commissioned.
- United States tanker India Arrow was torpedoed and sunk about 50 nautical miles (93 km) southeast of Atlantic City by German submarine U-103.
- Died: Joseph Henry Pendleton, 81, United States Marine Corps general

== February 5, 1942 (Thursday) ==
- The British corvette HMS Arbutus was torpedoed and sunk in the Atlantic Ocean by German submarine U-136.
- The Canadian troopship RMS Empress of Asia was sunk by Japanese dive bombers near Singapore.
- Iran broke off diplomatic relations with Vichy France.
- German submarine U-608 was commissioned.
- United States tanker China Arrow was torpedoed, shelled and sunk about 90 nautical miles (170 km) off the Delaware coast by German submarine U-103.
- Hermann Göring the Head of the German Luftwaffe returned from his visit in Italy.
- Born: Roger Staubach, American NFL quarterback and Pro Football Hall of Fame enshrinee; in Cincinnati, Ohio

== February 6, 1942 (Friday) ==
- German submarine U-82 was depth charged and sunk northeast of the Azores by British warships.
- Amin al-Husseini arrived in Italy from Germany with Rashid Ali al-Gaylani and conferred with Benito Mussolini.
- Mustafa el-Nahhas became Prime Minister of Egypt for the fourth time.
- Born: Ahmad-Jabir Ahmadov, professor and academic, in Nukha, Azerbaijan (d. 2021)

== February 7, 1942 (Saturday) ==
- Rommel halted his counteroffensive near Gazala. In a little over two weeks he had retaken almost all the ground that the British Eighth Army had taken at the end of 1941.
- Vidkun Quisling abolished the Norwegian constitution and established a dictatorship.
- The War Shipping Administration was established in the United States.
- Uruguay defeated Argentina to win the South American Championship of football in Montevideo.
- "A String of Pearls" by Glenn Miller and His Orchestra hit #1 on the Billboard singles charts.
- Born: Gareth Hunt, actor, in Battersea, London, England (d. 2007)

== February 8, 1942 (Sunday) ==
- The Battle of Singapore began with the Battle of Sarimbun Beach.
- The Demyansk Pocket was created when a pocket of German troops was encircled by the Red Army around Demyansk south of Leningrad.
- Died: Fritz Todt, 50, German engineer and senior Nazi official (plane crash)

== February 9, 1942 (Monday) ==
- The Battle of Sarimbun Beach ended in Japanese victory.
- The Battle of Kranji began during the battle for Singapore.
- Chiang Kai-shek and his wife arrived in India for a thirteen-day visit. Their arrival was kept a secret until the following day.
- The ocean liner USS Lafayette (formerly SS Normandie) capsized and sank in New York Harbor whilst under conversion to a troopship.
- Japanese destroyer Natsushio sank south of Makassar one day after being torpedoed by the American submarine S-37.
- Born: Carole King, composer and singer-songwriter, in Manhattan, New York
- Died: Lauri Kristian Relander, 58, 2nd President of Finland

== February 10, 1942 (Tuesday) ==
- The Battle of Kranji ended in Japanese victory.
- The Battle of Bukit Timah began in the battle for Singapore.
- The Canadian corvette HMCS Spikenard was torpedoed and sunk in the Atlantic Ocean by German submarine U-136.
- A two-day meeting between Ion Antonescu and Adolf Hitler began at the Wolf's Lair. Antonescu pledged to commit large Romanian forces to the upcoming offensive on the Eastern Front but asked for modern equipment as a condition. Antonescu also warned that Romania still claimed all of Transylvania, but promised not to press this demand until the end of the war. Hitler was non-committal, but later instructed all German officials to be careful in their dealings with Hungary and Romania since both would be called upon to make more sacrifices for the Axis war effort.
- Soap rationing began in Britain.
- The last civilian car rolled off the assembly line at the River Rouge Ford plant before the company switched production over to military vehicles such as service trucks and jeeps. Reporters and photographers were on hand to document the event.
- Born: Howard Mudd, football player and coach, in Midland, Michigan (d. 2020)

== February 11, 1942 (Wednesday) ==
- The Germans launched the Channel Dash, codenamed Operation Cerberus, with the goal of running a Kriegsmarine squadron of ships from Brest, France through a British blockade to their home bases in Germany.
- The American submarine USS Shark was sunk in the Pacific Ocean by the Japanese destroyer Yamakaze.
- Jacob Epstein's huge new sculpture depicting the Biblical story of Jacob wrestling with the angel went on show in London. His treatment of religious subject matter in a primitivist style was controversial for its time.
- German submarines U-518 and U-609 were commissioned.
- Born: Otis Clay, R&B and soul singer, in Waxhaw, Mississippi (d. 2016)
- Died: Ugo Pasquale Mifsud, 52, two-time Prime Minister of Malta

== February 12, 1942 (Thursday) ==
- The Battle of Bukit Timah ended in Japanese victory.
- The British destroyer HMS Maori was bombed and sunk by the Luftwaffe in the Malta Grand Harbour.
- A state funeral was held for Fritz Todt in Berlin. Hitler spoke at the service and then posthumously made Todt the first recipient of a newly created award, the German Order.
- German submarine U-661 was commissioned.
- Born: Ehud Barak, 10th Prime Minister of Israel, in Mishmar HaSharon, Mandatory Palestine
- Died:
  - Grant Wood, 50, American painter known for American Gothic
  - Gordon Houston, 25, American baseball player (plane crash);

== February 13, 1942 (Friday) ==
- The Battle of Palembang began near Palembang on Sumatra.
- The Battle of Pasir Panjang began in the battle for Singapore.
- The German Navy completed the Channel Dash; they managed to avoid British air and naval attacks, but both battlecruisers were seriously damaged by British sea mines.
- The British submarine Tempest was depth charged and sunk in the Gulf of Taranto by the Italian torpedo boat Circe.
- Born:
  - Carol Lynley, actress and child model, in Manhattan, New York (d. 2019);
  - Peter Tork, musician and actor (The Monkees), in Washington, D.C. (d. 2019)
- Died: Epitácio Pessoa, 76, 11th President of Brazil

== February 14, 1942 (Saturday) ==
- The Japanese invasion of Sumatra began.
- The Battle of Pasir Panjang ended in Japanese victory.
- The Battle of Bilin River began in Burma.
- The British Air Ministry issued the Area bombing directive, ordering RAF bombers to attack the German industrial workforce and the morale of the German populace through bombing German cities and their civilian inhabitants.
- British auxiliary patrol vessel Li Wo singlehandedly attacked a Japanese convoy north of the Bangka Strait, sinking the lead transport before being herself sunk by the squadron of escorting warships.
- The British gunboat HMS Grasshopper was bombed and sunk by Japanese aircraft off Rusuk Island.
- American converted troopship SS President Taylor grounded on the coral reef at Canton Island and could not be salvaged despite extensive efforts.
- Sarawakian steamship Vyner Brooke was bombed and sunk by Japanese aircraft while evacuating nurses and wounded servicemen out of Singapore.
- German submarines U-178 and U-336 were commissioned.
- "Blues in the Night" by Woody Herman and His Orchestra topped the Billboard singles charts.
- Born: Michael Bloomberg, business magnate and 108th Mayor of New York City, in Boston, Massachusetts
- Died:
  - Mirosław Ferić, 26, Polish flying ace (plane crash);
  - Thomas Wilkinson, 43, Royal Navy Lieutenant and posthumous recipient of the Victoria Cross (went down with the Li Wo)

== February 15, 1942 (Sunday) ==
- The Battle of Singapore ended in a decisive Japanese victory. The Japanese occupation of Singapore began.
- The Battle of Palembang ended in Japanese victory.
- President Roosevelt made a special broadcast to the people of Canada. "Yours are the achievements of a great nation," the president said after reviewing Canada's part in the war effort. "They require no praise from me-but they get that praise from me nevertheless. I understate the case when I say that we, in this country, contemplating what you have done, and the spirit in which you have done it, are proud to be your neighbors."
- The Ernst Lubitsch-directed comedy film To Be or Not to Be starring Carole Lombard, Jack Benny and Robert Stack premiered in Los Angeles.
- The New York Times crossword first appears.
- Born: Sherry Jackson, actress and child star, in Wendell, Idaho

== February 16, 1942 (Monday) ==
- In Sumatra, Palembang fell to Japanese forces.
- Japanese soldiers committed the Bangka Island massacre, gunning down 22 Australian Army nurses and some 60 Australian and British servicemen.
- Japanese forces in Borneo occupied the town of Sintang, West Kalimantan.
- Japanese Prime Minister Hideki Tojo appeared before the National Diet and outlined Japan's goals, in which he spoke of a "new order of coexistence and co-prosperity on ethical principles in Greater East Asia."

== February 17, 1942 (Tuesday) ==
- The Farrer Park address took place two days after the fall of Singapore when the British Malaya Command formally surrendered the Indian troops of the British Indian Army to Japanese Major Iwaichi Fujiwara. Authority was transferred in turn to the command of Mohan Singh, who addressed the gathered troops declaring the formation of the Indian National Army to fight the British Raj.
- The Dutch destroyer Van Nes was bombed and sunk by Japanese aircraft south of Bangka Island.
- Japanese occupiers changed the name of Singapore to Shonan, meaning "Light of the South".
- Born: Augusto Ponzio, semiologist and philosopher, in San Pietro Vernotico, Italy

== February 18, 1942 (Wednesday) ==
- The Battle of Bilin River ended in tactical Japanese victory.
- The Battle of Badung Strait began in the Badung Strait off Bali.
- The Sook Ching operation commenced as Japanese occupiers in Singapore began to massacre perceived hostile elements among the Chinese.
- Dutch submarine K VII was bombed and sunk at the Surabaya harbour by Japanese aircraft.
- American destroyer USS Truxton and general stores issue ship Pollux ran aground at Lawn Point, Newfoundland during a storm, resulting in 110 and 93 deaths, respectively.
- Chiang Kai-shek met with Mahatma Gandhi in Calcutta.
- Free French submarine Surcouf possibly sank north of Cristóbal, Colón, Panama after a collision with American freighter Thompson Lykes, though its fate is uncertain.
- German submarine U-259 was commissioned.

== February 19, 1942 (Thursday) ==
- Bombing of Darwin: 242 Japanese aircraft attacked the harbour and airfields around Darwin, Australia. The town was lightly defended and the Japanese inflicted heavy losses. Tanker British Motorist, cargo ships Don Isidro, Mauna Loa, Meigs, Neptuna and Zealandia, coal hulk Kelat, transport ship Portmar, patrol boats Coongoola and Mavie and destroyers USS Peary and HNLMS Piet Hein were all sunk. Hajime Toyoshima crash-landed on Melville Island and became the first Japanese prisoner of war on Australian soil.
- President Franklin D. Roosevelt signs an Executive order directing the internment Italian, German, and Japanese Americans and orders the seizure of their properties.
- The Battle of Sittang Bridge began in Burma.
- The Battle of Timor began.
- The Riom Trial began in Vichy France.
- In a campaign to promote the purchase of war bonds, the Canadian city of Winnipeg, Manitoba staged If Day, a simulated Nazi German invasion.
- Bombing of Mandalay: The Burmese capital of Mandalay was bombed by the Japanese for the first time.
- British tanker British Consul was torpedoed and sunk at Port of Spain, Trinidad by German submarine U-161. She was later salvaged and repaired.
- Stafford Cripps became Leader of the House of Commons and Lord Privy Seal.
- German submarine U-610 was commissioned.
- Born: Paul Krause, football player, in Flint, Michigan
- Died: Frank Abbandando, 31, American criminal (executed)

== February 20, 1942 (Friday) ==
- The Battle of Badung Strait ended in Japanese victory.
- The Action off Bougainville occurred.
- Edward O'Hare became the U.S. Navy's first flying ace.
- Japanese forces landed at Portuguese Timor and seized the airfield at Dili. Portugal protested to the Japanese government.
- The comedy film Ride 'Em Cowboy starring Abbott and Costello was released.
- Born:
  - Phil Esposito, ice hockey player and Hockey Hall of Fame inductee; in Sault Ste. Marie, Ontario, Canada;
  - Mitch McConnell, American politician, senior U.S. senator of Kentucky
- Died: Hamad ibn Isa Al Khalifa, 70, Hakim of Bahrain

== February 21, 1942 (Saturday) ==
- The British 7th Armoured Brigade arrived in Rangoon harbour.
- Uruguayan President Alfredo Baldomir staged a self-coup, dissolving congress and taking control of the government.
- Madame Chiang Kai-shek broadcast her husband's farewell message over Indian radio. "In these horrible times of savagery and brute force, the people of China and their brethren the people of India should, for the sake of civilization and human freedom, give their united support to the principles embodied in the Atlantic Charter and in the joint declaration of the 26 nations, and ally themselves with the anti-aggression front," the message read. "I hope the Indian people will wholeheartedly join the allies-namely, China, Great Britain, America and the Soviet Union-and participate shoulder to shoulder in the struggle for survival of a free world until complete victory has been achieved and the duties incumbent upon them in these troubled times have been fully discharged."
- German submarines U-210, U-441, U-515 and U-516 were commissioned.
- Born: Margarethe von Trotta, film director, in Berlin, Germany
- Died: Olena Teliha, 35, Soviet poet and activist (executed by the Gestapo)

== February 22, 1942 (Sunday) ==
- Civilians were evacuated from Rangoon as fighting came within 80 miles of the city.
- A British cabinet reshuffle installed P. J. Grigg as Secretary of State for War, Viscount Cranborne as Secretary of State for the Colonies, Lord Llewellin as Minister of Aircraft Production, Lord Portal as Minister of Works and Buildings and Lord Wolmer as Minister of Economic Warfare.
- The Zdzięcioł Ghetto was created.
- Dutch cargo ship Hanne was bombed and sunk in the Atlantic Ocean by the Luftwaffe.
- Died: Stefan Zweig, 60, Austrian novelist, playwright, journalist and biographer (committed suicide with his wife in Brazil in despair over the European situation)

== February 23, 1942 (Monday) ==
- The Battle of Sittang Bridge ended in decisive Japanese victory.
- The Bombardment of Ellwood occurred when a Japanese submarine shelled coastal targets near Santa Barbara, California.
- Sir Arthur Harris took over as Commander-in-Chief of RAF Bomber Command.
- British submarine P38 was depth charged and sunk in the Mediterranean east of Tripoli by Italian warships.
- The British tanker Empire Celt was torpedoed and sunk in the Atlantic Ocean by German submarine U-158.
- Gonars concentration camp was established near Gonars, Italy.
- Joseph Stalin marked the 24th anniversary of the founding of the Red Army with a statement broadcast to all Russians declaring that a "tremendous and hard fight" still lay ahead, but now that the Germans had spent the "element of surprise" the Soviets were taking the offensive and that "the Red banner will fly everywhere it has flown before."
- President Roosevelt gave a fireside chat on the progress of the war. "We have most certainly suffered losses – from Hitler's U-Boats in the Atlantic as well as from the Japanese in the Pacific – and we shall suffer more of them before the turn of the tide," Roosevelt said. "But, speaking for the United States of America, let me say once and for all to the people of the world: We Americans have been compelled to yield ground, but we will regain it. We and the other United Nations are committed to the destruction of the militarism of Japan and Germany. We are daily increasing our strength. Soon, we and not our enemies, will have the offensive; we, not they, will win the final battles; and we, not they, will make the final peace."
- German submarine U-410 was commissioned.

== February 24, 1942 (Tuesday) ==
- Struma disaster: With an estimated 781 Jewish refugees crammed aboard, the small Panamanian merchant ship MV Struma was torpedoed and sunk in the Black Sea by the Soviet submarine Shch-213. Only one person aboard, 19-year old Romanian David Stoliar, survived the sinking.
- German Ambassador to Turkey Franz von Papen survived an assassination attempt in Ankara when a Macedonian student fired a gun that missed and then accidentally blew himself up with a bomb that exploded before he could throw it. Later it was determined that the Soviets had supported the attempt on von Papen's life.
- Voice of America began short-wave radio broadcasts. Its initial programmes were in German.
- Internment of Japanese Canadians was ordered.
- The British tanker Empire Celt was torpedoed and sunk in the Atlantic Ocean by German submarine U-158.
- Bishops in Norway resigned from all their positions within the country's Lutheran Church rather than publicly declare allegiance to the Quisling regime.
- Born: Joe Lieberman, politician, in Stamford, Connecticut (d. 2024)

== February 25, 1942 (Wednesday) ==
- A mysterious event called the Battle of Los Angeles took place in the early morning hours over Los Angeles, California when an anti-aircraft artillery barrage was fired into the nighttime sky. Secretary of the Navy Frank Knox called the incident a "false alarm" but offered no other information.
- German law was established in the occupied Baltic states of Latvia, Estonia and Lithuania as well as Ukraine.
- ABDA Command was dissolved after only a few weeks of existence.
- German submarine U-381 was commissioned.
- Born: Karen Grassle, actress, in Berkeley, California
- Died: Alexander Savinov, 60, Russian and Soviet painter and art educator (died during the Siege of Leningrad)

== February 26, 1942 (Thursday) ==
- German battleship Gneisenau was bombed and heavily damaged in the drydock at Kiel by RAF bombers. The ship would be decommissioned later in the year and never returned to service.
- German submarine U-611 was commissioned.
- The Advertising Council, Inc is founded.
- The 14th Academy Awards were held in Los Angeles. How Green Was My Valley won Best Picture, and its director John Ford won his third Oscar for Best Director. The category Best Documentary (Short Subject) was awarded for the first time, won by the National Film Board of Canada's entry Churchill's Island.

== February 27, 1942 (Friday) ==
- The Battle of the Java Sea was fought in the Pacific, resulting in a Japanese victory. The Allies lost two cruisers and three destroyers while the Japanese only had a destroyer damaged in return.
- The American seaplane tender USS Langley was badly damaged south of Java by Japanese dive bombers and had to be scuttled.
- The British executed Operation Biting, an overnight attack on a German radar installation at Bruneval in northern France.
- Born:
  - Robert H. Grubbs, chemist and Nobel laureate, in Possum Trot, Kentucky (d. 2021);
  - Michel Forget, actor, in Montreal, Quebec, Canada
- Died: Alexander van Geen, 38, Dutch Olympic modern pentathlete and Royal Netherlands Navy artillery officer (killed in action during the Battle of the Java Sea)

== February 28, 1942 (Saturday) ==
- The Battle of Sunda Strait began in the Sunda Strait, Dutch East Indies.
- The Battle of Java began.
- The Vyazma airborne operation ended in Soviet partial victory.
- The United States Army Services of Supply or "SOS" branch of the U.S. Army was created.
- American destroyer Jacob Jones and tanker R.P. Resor were torpedoed and sunk east of New Jersey by German submarine U-578.
- German submarine U-757 was commissioned.
- "Moonlight Cocktail" by Glenn Miller and His Orchestra went to #1 on the Billboard singles charts.
- The play Lady in Danger by Max Afford premiered at the Independent Theatre in Sydney, Australia.
- Born:
  - Brian Jones, rock musician and founder of The Rolling Stones, in Cheltenham, Gloucestershire, England (d. 1969);
  - Dino Zoff, football goalkeeper and manager, in Mariano del Friuli, Italy
- Died:
  - Karel Doorman, 52, Dutch Rear Admiral (killed in action during the Battle of the Java Sea)
  - Oskar Fischer, 65, Czech Scientist (beaten to death in Terezín's Ghetto)
