= Fujita salvage operation =

Coordinates: 12°31′S 130°50′E

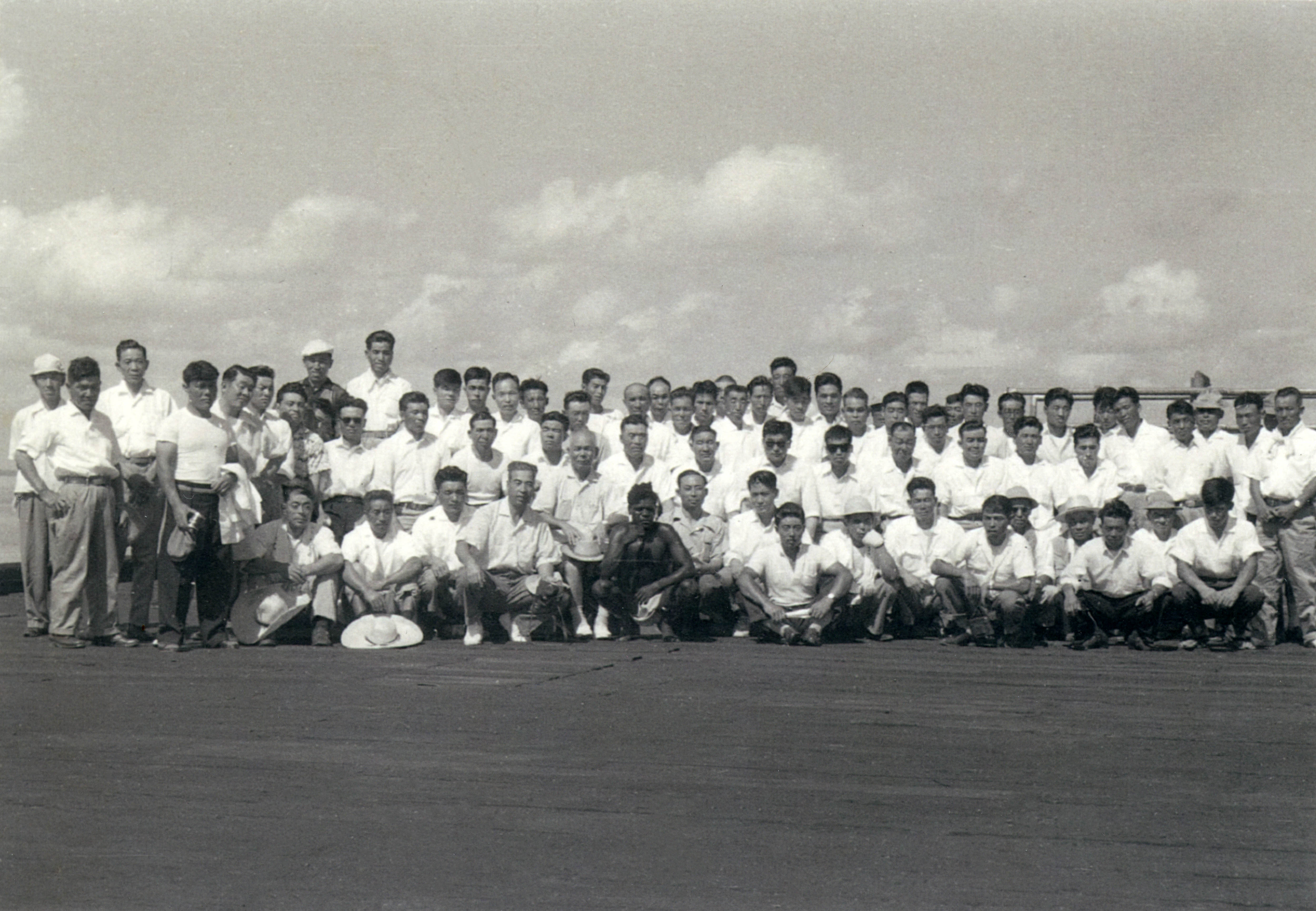
Crew of the Fujita Salvage Company in Darwin, Australia in 1959

The Fujita salvage operation was a two-year marine salvage operation of World War II shipwrecks in Darwin Harbour in the Northern Territory of Australia from 1959 to 1961.

== Bombing of Darwin ==
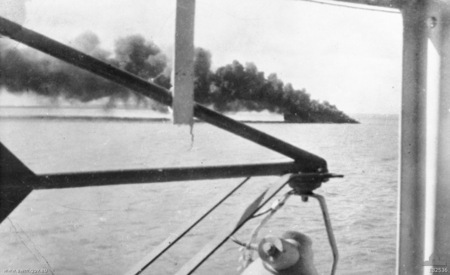
Peary sinking at Darwin, 19 February 1942.

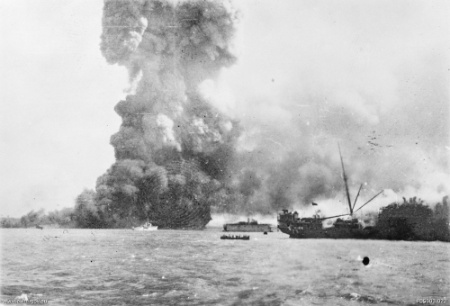
MV Neptuna explodes at Stokes Hill Wharf in 1942

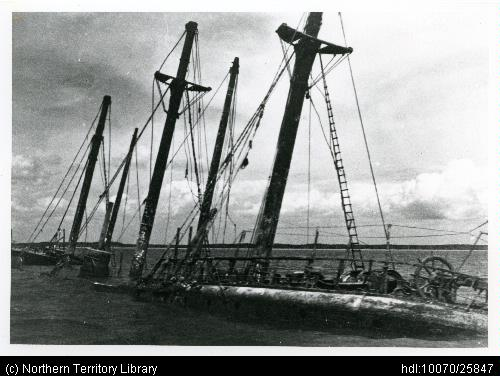
Kelat shipwreck

Darwin was bombed by the Japanese Imperial Navy on 19 February 1942. Four Japanese aircraft carriers launched 188 aircraft during the morning led by Commander Mitsuo Fuchida targeting ships in Darwin Harbour as well as the town's port facilities.

The Japanese raiders arrived over Darwin at 9:58 am. HMAS Gunbar was the first ship to be attacked, being strafed by several Zero fighters. At about this time, the town's air raid sirens were belatedly sounded. The Japanese bombers then conducted dive bombing and level bombing attacks on the ships in Darwin Harbour. These attacks lasted for 30 minutes and resulted in the sinking of three warships and six merchant vessels, damaging another ten ships. The ships sunk were the USS Peary, HMAS Mavie, USAT Meigs, MV Neptuna (which exploded while docked at Darwin's main wharf), Zealandia, SS Mauna Loa, MV British Motorist. The oil tanker Karalee and the coal storage hulk Kelat sank later. At least 21 labourers working on the wharf were killed when it was bombed. On their way back to the carriers, some Japanese aircraft passed over the Florence D. and Don Isidro, which enabled planning for an afternoon strike which sank both freighters.

== Salvage operation ==
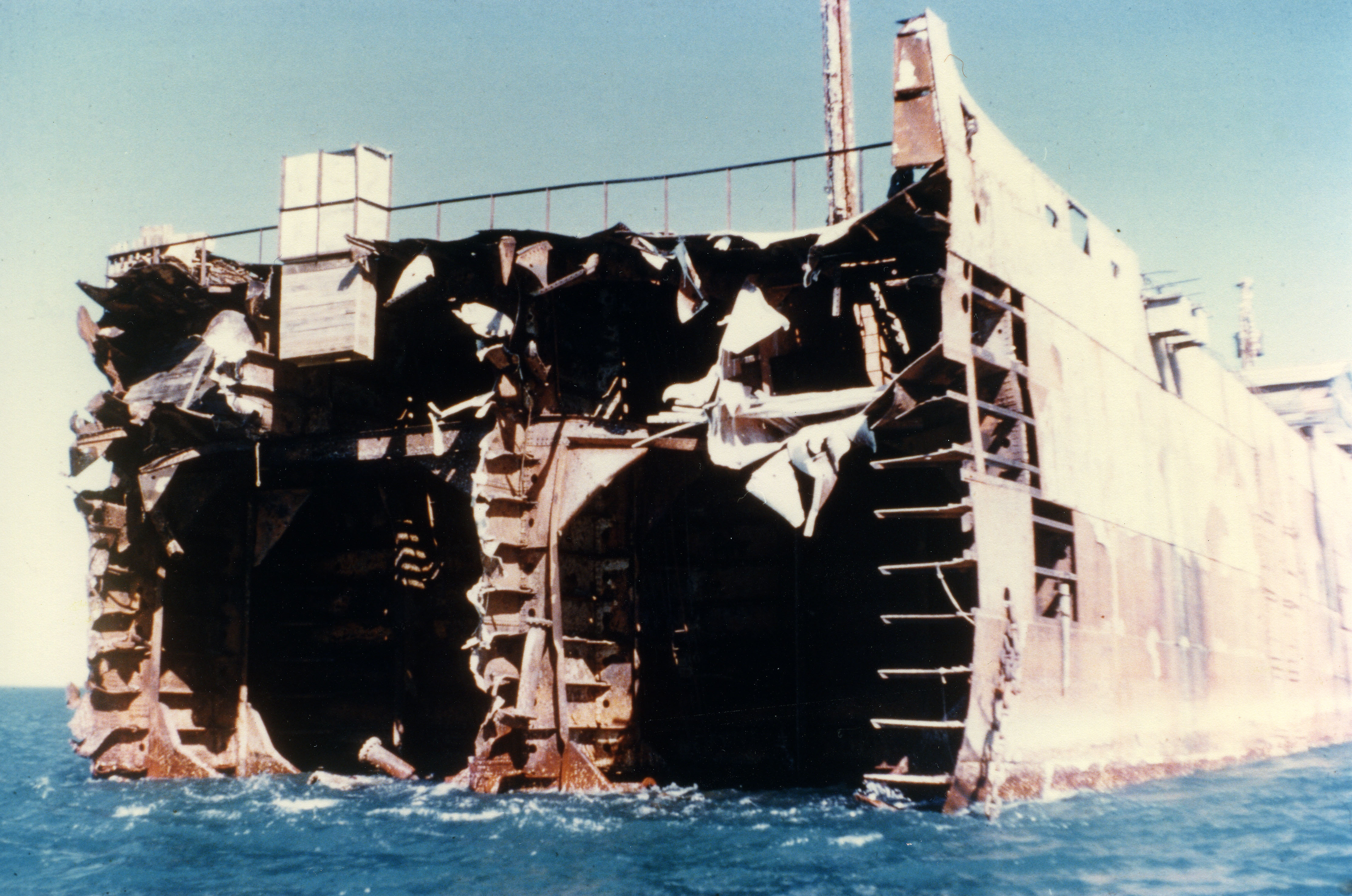
MV British Motorist, salvaged in Darwin Harbour

By the late 1950s, seven large wrecks remained in Darwin Harbour, an impediment to shipping and port development. After numerous attempts to find a contractor, a Japanese company, the Fujita Salvage Company successfully secured the tender and obtained the rights to the wartime wrecks, many from Darwin salvage expert Carl Atkinson. Ryogo Fujita and his crew of 120 workers arrived in Darwin on 21 July 1959.

The first ship they raised from the ocean floor was a transporter, the MV British Motorist. The ship became the living quarters for Fujita's workers who were initially not permitted on Australian soil so soon after World War 2. They were not permitted to work in Darwin if they had any involvement in the Japanese war efforts.

They salvaged seven wrecks over two years including MV Neptuna, USAT Meigs and the USS Peary. Fujita also salvaged other metal materials from across the Darwin region, including the guns at East Point.

A Japanese diver, Hayashi Sanzo died during the operation, when his air line became detached from his helmet.

== Legacy ==
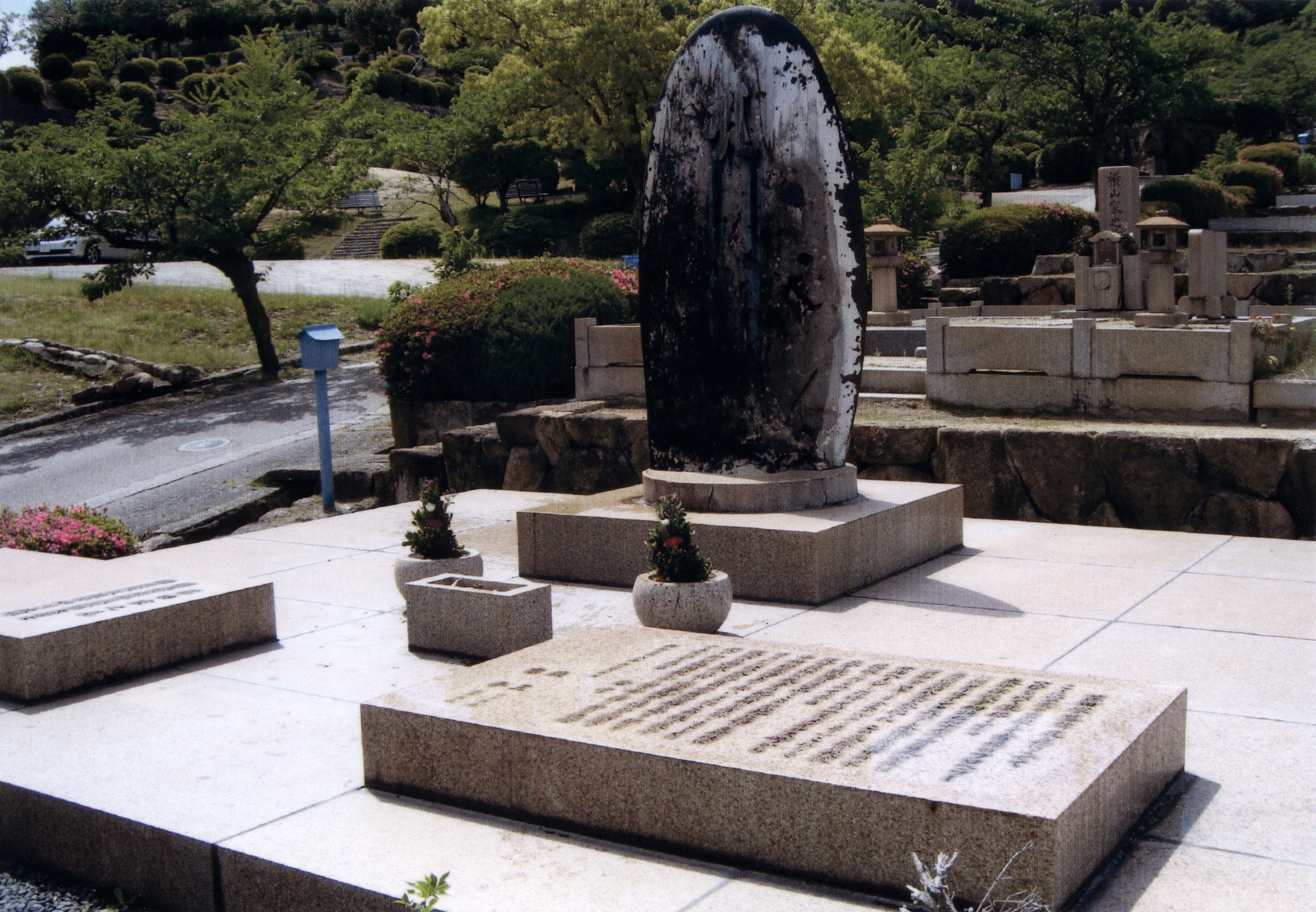
Fujita family tombstone featuring a propeller blade from the Meigs

Relationships between the Darwin community and Fujita Salvage Company crew grew over the two-year operation. The salvage operations on the harbour coincided with the building of a new church on the Smith Street site of the former US military headquarters, destroyed during the war. Fujita, in a spirit of generosity, commissioned his team to create 77 bronze crosses for the church from scrap salvaged from the Australian vessel Zealandia. He spoke at the official opening of the church on 23 July 1960, a year after the arrival of the Japanese salvage team.

Fujita considered the salvage operation his life work. A propeller blade from the Meigs features on his gravestone. The blade was gifted and relocated to Darwin Memorial Uniting Church in 2017.

The Fujita family album is held at Northern Territory Library. It was exhibited in 2016.

== See also ==
- Marine salvage
- Bombing of Darwin
