= Bombing of Darwin =

1942 Japanese attack on Australia in WWII

- Part of the Pacific War
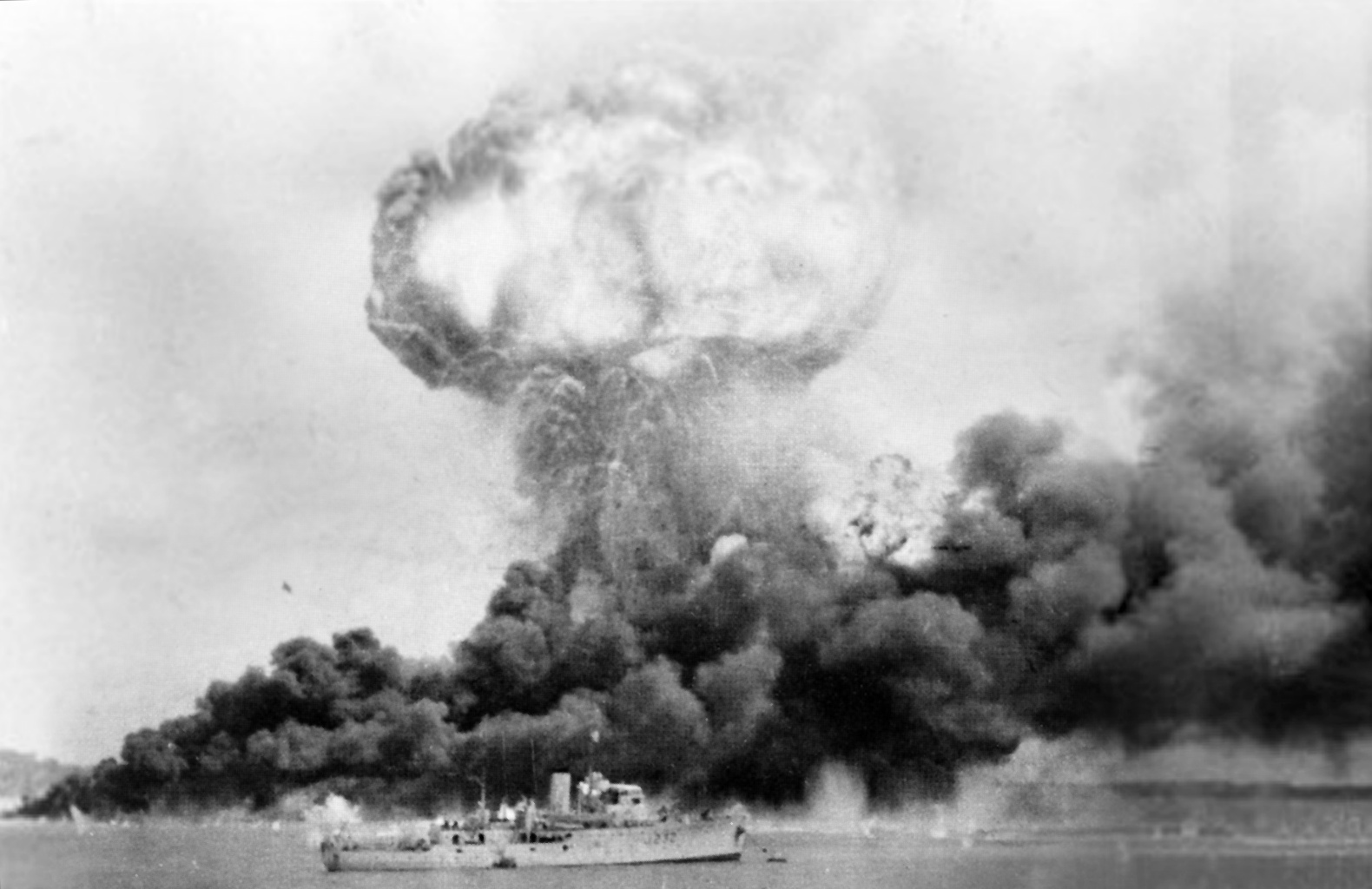
- The explosion of MV Neptuna, filled with TNT and ammunition, hit during the first Japanese air raid on Australia's mainland, at Darwin on 19 February 1942. In the foreground is HMAS Deloraine, which escaped damage.
Date	19 February 1942; 84 years ago
Location	Darwin, Northern Territory, Australia 12°28′30″S 130°51′00″E
Result	Japanese victory

Belligerents
Australia; United States	Empire of Japan

Commanders and leaders
(Australia) David V. J. Blake (Australia) Frederick Scherger	(Empire of Japan) Chuichi Nagumo (Empire of Japan) Mitsuo Fuchida

Strength
31 aircraft 18 antiaircraft guns 1 destroyer 1 seaplane tender 2 sloops 4 minesweepers/corvettes 4 boom defence vessels 9 merchant ships/transports 1 hospital ship 23 auxiliary vessels 12 pearling luggers	242 aircraft (188 carrier-based aircraft; 54 land-based medium bomber aircraft); 4 aircraft carriers 2 heavy cruisers 1 light cruiser 7 destroyers 3 submarines

Casualties and losses
236 killed 300–400 wounded 30 aircraft destroyed 11 vessels sunk 3 vessels grounded 25 ships damaged	2 killed 1 POW; 34 carrier aircraft damaged
- Location within Northern Territory Bombing of Darwin (Australia) Bombing of Darwin (Pacific Ocean)

On 19 February 1942, 188 carrier based & 54 land based Japanese aircraft, in two separate raids, bombed the Australian town of Darwin, ships in Darwin Harbour and the town's two airfields in an attempt to prevent the Allies from using them as bases to contest the invasion of Timor and Java during World War II. This was the largest single attack ever mounted by a foreign power on Australia.

Darwin was very lightly defended relative to the size of this attack, and the Japanese inflicted heavy losses upon Allied forces at little cost to themselves. The urban areas of Darwin also suffered some damage from the raids and there were a number of civilian casualties. More than half of Darwin's civilian population left the area permanently, before or immediately after the attack.

The two Japanese air raids were the first, and largest, of more than 100 air raids against Australia during 1942–1943. The event happened just four days after the Fall of Singapore, when a combined Commonwealth force surrendered to the Japanese, the largest surrender in British history.

== Background ==
In 1942, Darwin—the capital of the Northern Territory—was a small town with limited civil and military infrastructure. Due to its strategic position in northern Australia, the Royal Australian Navy (RAN) and Royal Australian Air Force (RAAF) had constructed bases near the town in the 1930s and the early years of World War II. Darwin's pre-war population was 5,800.

As early as August 1941, Darwin had been a key component in the South Pacific air ferry route designed to avoid routes through the Japanese mandate in the central Pacific for bomber reinforcement of the Philippines. The first flight to use the route occurred when nine B-17D bombers of the 14th Bombardment Squadron (H) left Hawaii on 5 September and passed through Darwin 10–12 September. By October 1941, plans were underway to position fuel and supplies with two ships, including USAT Don Esteban, being chartered and actively engaged in that purpose when war came. By November 1941, Australia had agreed to allow the establishment of training bases, maintenance facilities, munitions storage, communications, and improvement of airfields, including at Darwin, to meet the needs of the B-17 bombers in Australia.

Following the outbreak of the Pacific War in early December 1941, Darwin's defences were strengthened. In line with plans developed before the war, several Australian Army and RAAF units stationed in the town were sent to the Netherlands East Indies (Dutch East Indies; NEI) to strengthen the defences of the islands of Ambon and Timor. An improvised plan for support of the Philippines and the Dutch East Indies was completed in Washington on 20 December 1941 by the US Army General Staff. It envisioned Darwin as the hub of transshipment efforts to supply those forces by landing supplies at Brisbane, shipping overland to Darwin, and onward by air and blockade-running ships. In reality, transport to Darwin by sea was necessary. Supplies and shipping intended both to build the Darwin base and to support the Java and Philippine forces were gathered in Darwin and the vicinity. In the two months before the air raids, all but 2,000 civilians were evacuated from the town. Japanese submarines I-121 and I-123 laid mines off Darwin in January 1942.

By mid-February 1942, Darwin had become an important Allied base for the defence of the NEI. The Japanese had captured Ambon, Borneo and Celebes between December 1941 and early-February 1942. Landings on Timor were scheduled for 20 February, and an invasion of Java was planned to take place shortly afterwards. In order to protect these landings from Allied interference, the Japanese military command decided to conduct a major air raid on Darwin. On 10 February a Japanese reconnaissance aircraft overflew the town, and identified an aircraft carrier (actually the seaplane tender USS Langley), five destroyers and 21 merchant ships in Darwin Harbour, as well as 30 aircraft at the town's two airfields.

Among the ships in harbour were those returned the morning before the attack from the convoy escorted by USS Houston involved in the failed effort to reinforce Timor. Houston had departed for Java but left Mauna Loa and the Meigs which had attempted to transport Australian troops to Timor and the US Army transports Portmar and Tulagi which had embarked a US infantry regiment at Darwin.

== Prelude ==
=== Opposing forces ===
Despite Darwin's strategic importance to the defence of Australia, the city was poorly defended. The Australian Army's anti-aircraft defences comprised sixteen QF 3.7-inch AA guns and two 3-inch AA guns to counter aircraft flying at high altitude and a small number of Lewis Guns for use against low-flying raiders. The crews of these guns had conducted little recent training due to ammunition shortages. The air forces stationed in and near the town comprised No. 12 Squadron, which was equipped with CAC Wirraway advanced trainers (which had been pressed into service as fighters), and No. 13 Squadron which operated Lockheed Hudson light bombers. Six Hudsons, 3 from No. 2 Squadron and 3 from No. 13 Squadron, also arrived at Darwin on 19 February after having been evacuated from Timor. None of the six Wirraways at Darwin on the day of the raid were serviceable. At the time of the event, there was no functional radar to provide early warning of air raids, and the town's civil defences were dysfunctional. The Lowe Commission, led by Victorian judge Charles Lowe and appointed to investigate the raids shortly after they occurred, was informed that the Australian military estimated that Darwin would have needed 36 heavy anti-aircraft guns and 250 fighter aircraft to defend it against a raid of the scale which occurred on 19 February. In addition to the Australian forces, ten United States Army Air Forces (USAAF) Curtiss P-40 Warhawks were passing through Darwin en route to Java on the day of the attack. The P-40 pilots were largely inexperienced in combat.

Table of warships & merchant vessels in Darwin harbour on 19 February 1942
	Tons	Ship name	Comment	Deaths
1	9155	HMAHS Manunda	Hospital ship	12
2	7358	USAT Meigs	Freight transport, sunk	1
3	6891	MV British Motorist	Tanker, sunk	2
4	6683	SS Zealandia	Troopship, sunk	2
5	5952	MV Neptuna	Freight transport, sunk	36
6	5551	SS Portmar	Freight transport, beached, refloated 6 April	1
7	5436	USAT Mauna Loa	Freight transport, sunk	
8	4265	SS Barossa	Freight transport, beached, refloated 17 April	
9	3476	HMAS Platypus	Depot ship	
10	3289	SS Admiral Halstead	Freight transport, 14,000 drums aviation gasoline, damaged	
11	2281	MV Tulagi	Freight transport, beached, refloated 20 February	
12	1849	Kelat	Coal hulk, sunk 24 February	
13	1308	USS William B. Preston	Seaplane tender, damaged	14
14	1190	USS Peary	Destroyer, sunk	88
15	1060	HMAS Swan	Sloop	3
16	1060	HMAS Warrego	Sloop	
17	1000	Floating Dock (AD 1001)	Floating dock	
18	815	HMAS Deloraine	Minesweeper	
19	815	HMAS Katoomba	Minesweeper	
20	815	HMAS Townsville	Minesweeper	
21	815	HMAS Warrnambool	Minesweeper	
22	768	HMAS Kangaroo	Boom Defence Vessel	1
23	768	HMAS Karangi	Boom Defence Vessel	
24	768	HMAS Koala	Boom Defence Vessel	
25	553	HMAS Kookaburra	Boom Defence Vessel	
26	550	Oil Fuel Lighter No 1	Lighter	
27	525	HMAS Kara Kara	Boom Gate Vessel	2
28	480	HMAS Gunbar	Coaster	1
29	448	HMAS Koompartoo	Boom Defence Vessel	
30	420	HMAS Terka	Minesweeper	
31	418	HMAS Tolga	Minesweeper	
32	298	HMAS Southern Cross	Examination vessel	
33	292	HMAS Wato	Tug	
34	118	HMAS Kalaroo	Lighter	
35	117	Karalee	Lighter, sank 5 March	
36	106	HMAS Vigilant	Patrol boat	
37	68	HMAS Mako	Patrol boat	
38	60	HMAS Chinampa	Ketch	
39	57	HMAS Malanda	Lugger	
40	55	HMAS Kuru	Patrol boat	
41	45	HMAS Winbah	Patrol boat	
42	45	Yampi Lass	Lighter	
43	35	HMAS Nereus	Patrol boat	
44	34	HMAS Coongoola	Patrol boat	
45	21	HMAS Arthur Rose	Lugger	
46	21	HMAS Griffioen	Lugger	
47	21	HMAS Ibis	Lugger	
48	21	Mars	Lugger	
49	21	HMAS Medic	Lugger	
50	21	Plover	Lugger	
51	21	HMAS Red Bill	Lugger	
52	21	HMAS St.Francis	Lugger	
53	20	HMAS Moruya	Lugger	
54	19	HMAS Mavie	Lugger, Sunk	
55	15	HMAS Kiara	Patrol boat	
56	15	HMAS Sulituan	Ketch	
57	12	HMAS Larrakia	Examination vessel	

A total of 65 Allied warships and merchant vessels were in Darwin harbour at the time of the raids. The warships included the United States Navy (USN) destroyer Peary and seaplane tender William B. Preston. The RAN ships in port were the sloops Swan and Warrego, corvettes Deloraine and Katoomba, auxiliary minesweepers Gunbar and Tolga, patrol boat Coongoola, depot ship Platypus, examination vessel Southern Cross, lugger Mavie, and four boom-net ships. Several USN and Australian troopships were in the harbour along with a number of merchant vessels of varying sizes. Most of the ships in the harbour were anchored near each other, making them an easy target for air attack. Moreover, no plans had been prepared for how the ships should respond to an air raid.

In addition to the vessels in port, the American Army supply ships Don Isidro and Florence D., former Philippine vessels acquired as part of the South West Pacific Area command's permanent Army fleet earlier in February, were near Bathurst Island bound for the Philippines with arms and supplies on the morning of the raid.

Darwin was attacked by aircraft flying from aircraft carriers and land bases in the NEI. The main force involved in the raid was the 1st Carrier Air Fleet which was commanded by Vice-Admiral Chūichi Nagumo. This force comprised the aircraft carriers Akagi, Kaga, Hiryū, and Sōryū and a powerful force of escorting surface ships. All four carriers had participated in the attack on Pearl Harbor at the start of the Pacific War. In addition to the carrier-based aircraft, 54 land-based bombers also struck Darwin in a high-level bombing raid nearly two hours after the first one struck at 0956. These comprised 27 G3M "Nell" bombers flying from Ambon and another 27 G4M "Betty" bombers operating from Kendari in Celebes.

== Air raids ==
=== First raid ===
The four Japanese aircraft carriers launched 188 aircraft on the morning of 19 February. The main objective of their crews was attacking ships and port facilities in Darwin Harbour. Their aircraft comprised 81 Nakajima B5N ("Kate") light bombers, 71 Aichi D3A ("Val") dive bombers, and an escort of 36 Mitsubishi A6M ("Zero") fighters. While the B5N was a purpose-built torpedo bomber, it could instead carry up to 800 kilograms (1,800 lb) of bombs and there is no evidence of torpedoes being used on this occasion; the D3A could carry up to 514 kilograms (1,133 lb) of bombs. All of these aircraft were launched by 8.45 am. This wave was led by Commander Mitsuo Fuchida, who had also commanded the first wave of attackers during the raid on Pearl Harbor.

On their way to Darwin, Zeros shot down a US Navy PBY Catalina and strafed a USAAF C-47 Skytrain on the ground, near Melville Island. At 9.35 am Father McGrath of the Sacred Heart mission on Bathurst Island, who was also an Australian coastwatcher, sent a message using a pedal radio to the Amalgamated Wireless Postal Radio Station at Darwin that a large number of aircraft were flying overhead and proceeding southward. The message was then relayed to the Royal Australian Air Force Operations at 9.37 am. No general alarm was given until about 10 am as the RAAF officers there wrongly judged that the aircraft which had been sighted were the ten USAAF P-40s, which were returning to Darwin at the time after reports of bad weather forced them to abort a flight to Java via Kupang, West Timor. As a result, the air raid sirens at Darwin were not sounded before the raid.

Flying escort in a Zero fighter, Petty Officer Yoshikazu Nagahama was separated from his squadron while he was attacking the PBY flying boat and arrived over the city alone ahead of the strike force, which was making a turn to attack from the south. He engaged five US Army Air Force P-40 Warhawk fighters and single-handedly shot down four of them.

The Japanese raiders began to arrive over Darwin at 9:58 am. HMAS Gunbar was the first ship to be attacked, being strafed by several Zero fighters. At about this time, the town's air raid sirens were belatedly sounded. The Japanese bombers then conducted dive bombing and level bombing attacks on the ships in Darwin Harbour. These attacks lasted for 30 minutes, and resulted in the sinking of three warships and six merchant vessels, and damage to another ten ships. The ships sunk were the USS Peary, HMAS Mavie, USAT Meigs, MV Neptuna (which exploded while docked at Darwin's main wharf), Zealandia, SS Mauna Loa, MV British Motorist. The oil tanker Karalee and the coal storage hulk Kelat sank later. At least 21 labourers working on the wharf were killed when it was bombed.

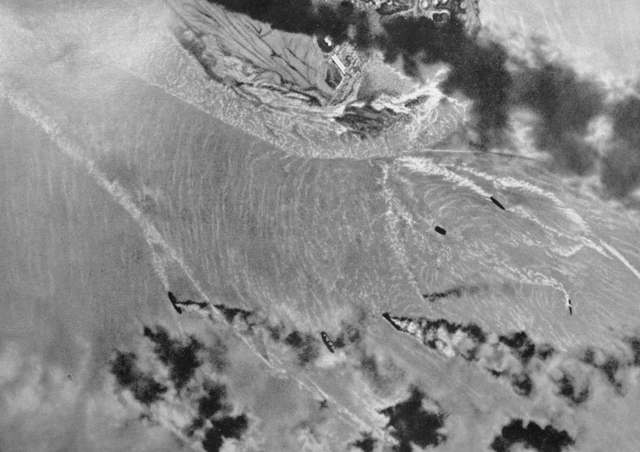
An aerial photograph of vessels burning in Darwin Harbour taken by a Japanese airman during the first raid.

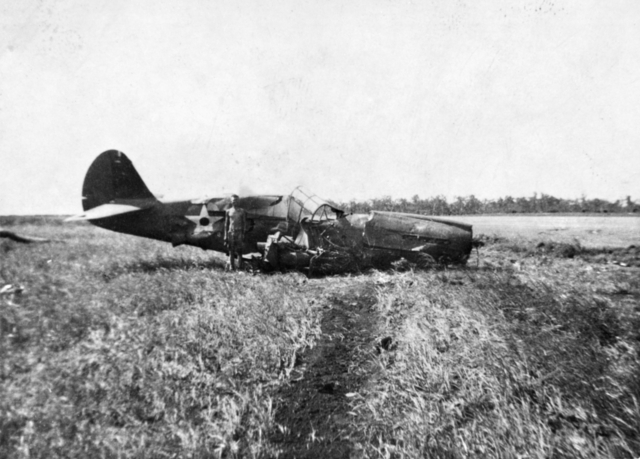
A downed USAAF P-40E

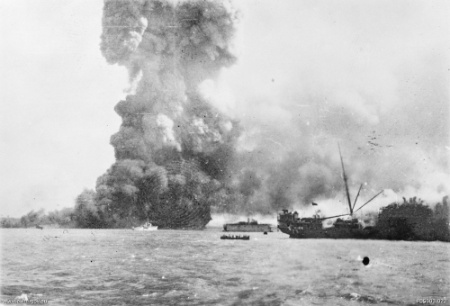
MV Neptuna explodes at Stokes Hill Wharf. In front of the explosion is HMAS Vigilant which is undertaking rescue work. In the centre background is the floating dry dock holding the corvette HMAS Katoomba. In the foreground is the damaged SS Zealandia.

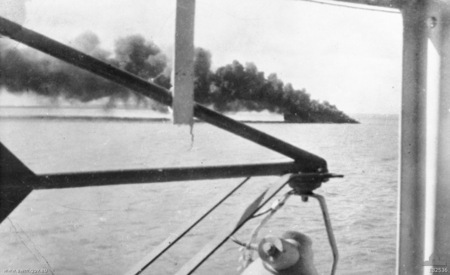
USS Peary sinking.

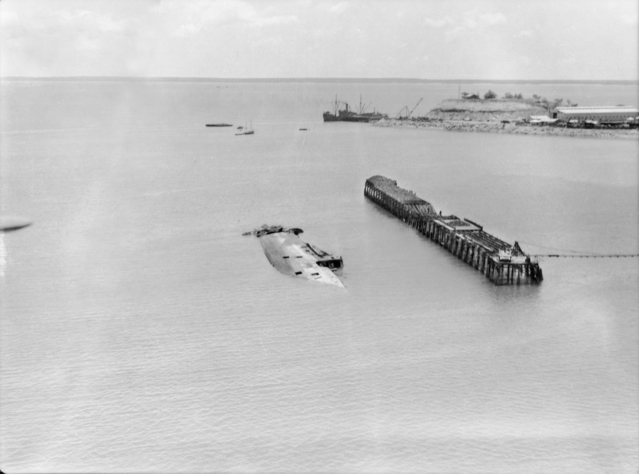
A sunken ship (MV Neptuna) and burnt-out wharf in Darwin Harbour following the attack (AWM 027334)

All but one of the P-40s of Major Floyd Pell's 33rd Pursuit Squadron, was shot down or destroyed on the ground at RAAF Darwin by the Japanese. Japanese aircraft bombed and strafed the base and civil airfield, as well as the town's army barracks and oil store. All of these facilities were seriously damaged.

The bombers began to leave the Darwin area at about 10:10. On their way back to the carriers, their crews noted two Philippine-registered freighters lying just outside the port: Florence D. and Don Isidro. This information contributed to planning for the second raid that afternoon (which sank both vessels).

Japanese losses may have been as few as five aircraft and three crew. Another 34 Japanese aircraft landed safely with battle damage. Warrant Officer Katsuyoshi Tsuru and First Petty Officer (1st class) Takezo Uchikado were killed when their Aichi dive bomber (bu. no. 3304; tail no. AII-254) crashed near RAAF Darwin. Petty Officer Hajime Toyoshima (a.k.a. Tadao Minami) was taken prisoner after crash-landing his damaged Zero (bu. no. b. n.5349; tail no. BII-124) on Melville Island. Those who ditched near the Japanese fleet and were rescued included Flyer 1st class Yoshio Egawa and the Aichi crew of Flyer 1st class Takeshi Yamada and Flyer 1st class Kinji Funazaki. In 2013, a reference was discovered in Japanese records to a Nakajima torpedo bomber suffering wheel damage from a "gunshot" and both crew (names unknown) being rescued after ditching (by the destroyer Tanikaze).

Allied ground fire was relatively intense and may have claimed all but two of the Japanese aircraft lost. Only one of the USAAF P-40 pilots remained airborne throughout the first attack, 1st Lieutenant Robert Oestreicher, who has also been credited by US and Japanese sources with one Aichi shot down and one damaged. Toyoshima's Zero is considered to have been brought down by small arms fire from Sappers Tom Lamb and Len O'Shea of the 19th Battalion. Most aviation historians believe Tsuru and Uchikado's Aichi was brought down by ground fire, possibly from a major Australian Army camp at Winnellie. Egawa reported that the damage to his Zero came from hitting a tree at Darwin.

=== Second raid ===
The second wave, made up of 54 land-based medium bombers (27 Mitsubishi G3M and 27 Mitsubishi G4M) arrived over Darwin just before midday. The town's air raid sirens were sounded at 11:58 am when the bombers were sighted. The Japanese force separated into two groups flying at 18,000 feet (5,500 m). One of these formations attacked RAAF Base Darwin from the south-west while the other approached from the north-east. The two formations arrived over the base at the same time, and dropped their bombs simultaneously. The Japanese bombers then turned, and made a second attack on the base. Due to defective fuses, the Australian heavy anti-aircraft flak gunners were unable to shoot down or damage any of the high-flying Japanese aircraft. The bombers left the Darwin area at about 12:20 pm.

This raid inflicted extensive damage on the RAAF base, though casualties were light. Of the RAAF aircraft at the base, six Hudson light bombers were destroyed and another Hudson and a Wirraway were badly damaged. Two American P-40s and a B-24 Liberator bomber were also destroyed. Six RAAF personnel were killed. Lewis and Ingman list 30 aircraft destroyed.

The Japanese carrier force launched a small number of D3A dive bombers during the afternoon of 19 February to attack the Florence D. and Don Isidro. Don Isidro was the first of these two ships to be attacked, and was rapidly sunk 40 kilometres (25 mi) north of Melville Island. Eleven of her 84-strong crew were killed. The dive bombers also attacked Florence D. and sank her off Bathurst Island with the loss of four crewmen. All of the survivors from Don Isidro were rescued by the corvette HMAS Warrnambool on 20 February. Some of Florence D.'s survivors landed on Bathurst and Melville Islands while the remainder were rescued by Warrnambool on 23 February. Among the survivors of Florence D. were the rescued crew of a US Navy PBY piloted by then Lt Thomas H. Moorer (later to become Chairman of the US Joint Chiefs of Staff).

Admiral Halstead, strafed and with plates damaged by near misses, was brought to the pier where US Army volunteers along with survivors of the US and Philippine vessels helped unload her 14,000 drums of aviation gasoline.

== Aftermath ==
=== Consequences ===
Of major military consequence was the loss of most of the cargo shipping available to support efforts in Java and the Philippines with Java being effectively sealed off from further surface shipments from Australia.

The air raids caused chaos in Darwin, with most essential services including water and electricity being badly damaged or destroyed. Fears of an imminent invasion spread and there was a wave of refugees, as some of the town's civilian population fled inland. There were reports of looting, with provost marshals being among the accused. According to official figures, 278 personnel belonging to RAAF North-Western Area Command (NWA) were considered to have deserted as a result of the raids, although it has been argued that the "desertions" were mostly the result of ambiguous orders given to RAAF ground staff after the attacks. In the words of journalist Douglas Lockwood, after the second Japanese air raid, the commander of RAAF Darwin, Wing Commander Sturt de Burgh Griffith:

summoned his senior administrative officer, Squadron Leader Swan, and gave a verbal order that all airmen were to move half a mile down the main road and then half a mile inland. At this vague rendezvous point [...] arrangements would be made to feed them. The order led to utter chaos. In being passed by word of mouth from one section to another, sometimes with officers present and sometimes not, it became garbled to the extent it was unrecognisable against the original. In its ultimate form it was interpreted, especially by those desiring such an interpretation, of an impending order for immediate and general evacuation of the area. Highly exaggerated rumours of an impending Japanese invasion had already reached the base from the town and spread quickly among those wanting to believe them. In the absence of restraint, men gathered their belongings and abandoned their stations.

While the NWA staff could see what was happening and issued countermanding orders "the damage was done and hundreds of men were already beyond recall".

The Australian Army also faced difficulty controlling some of its own troops from looting private property, including "furniture, refrigerators, stoves, pianos, clothes[,] [and] even children's toys" due to the breakdown of law and order after the bombing and the ensuing chaos. Many civilian refugees never returned, or did not return for many years, and in the post-war years some land they owned in Darwin had been expropriated by government bodies in their absence, made legal by the Darwin Lands Acquisition Act 1945.

The bombing of Darwin resulted in the destruction of 7 of the 11 above ground storage tanks, located on Stokes Hill, in raids on 19 February 16 March and 16 June 1942. This led to the construction of underground oil storage tunnels in Darwin in 1943.

== Casualties and damage ==
Casualties in Darwin on 19 February 1942
Vessel / service / location	Alderman's estimates	Documented deaths	Notes
Neptuna	45	36	Five of the missing seamen were located in Alice Springs in March, and four others were evacuated on HMAHS Manunda. The Australian War memorial records the names of all 36 killed, and the Hong Kong Memorial records the names of the 25 Chinese seamen. Brendan de Burca, senior surviving Officer and George Boniface, senior surviving Engineer, both record 36 Neptuna crewmen died on 19 February.
Zealandia	3	2	Only Masson and O'Connell died of their wounds. The ship's log also records the names of two other crew who died in later, unrelated incidents: Reginald Forster, who died on 4 March when a truck he was travelling in overturned, and Keith Davern, who died on 19 March as a result of a subsequent air raid.
British Motorist	2	2	Bates and Webster See the Manunda log for the disposal of the bodies. NAA:SP290/2 1941/MANUNDA/4
Manunda	12	12	The Manunda log records the deaths of 12 crew members and 24 patients NAA:SP290/2 1941/MANUNDA/4. Those who died include: 9 crewmen, 3 AIF Hospital staff on board, 9 from the USS Peary, 2 from HMAS Kara Kara, Jack Dee from 2/14 Field Arty, 3 from HMAS Swan, 2 from British Motorist, 1 from HMAS Gunbar, 2 from Zealandia, Rowling from the Post Office and Bauer from the US 148 Field Arty, plus Hynes and Byers from the Wharf.
HMAS Swan	4	3	Breen, Purdon and Sault. The bodies of these three were delivered to the Manunda and are counted in those buried on 20 February
HMAS Kara Kara	5	2	(Kara Kara is frequently misspelt Karakara.) Emms and Moore
HMAS Gunbar	1	1	(Gunbar is frequently misspelt "Gunbower".) "Jack" Shepherd
USS Peary	80	88	Eight of the crew died aboard the Manunda, and Roy Carlson died in Perth on 1 March. Northern Territory Library Roll of Honour. Errors on the memorial Plaques in Darwin are noted in Wikipedia
USAT Meigs	2	1	Cleborne
Port Mar	1	1	Tyrell
Mauna Loa	5	0	Enright and Stindt record that there were no deaths on Mauna Loa except for Manuel da Silva, who died before the attack. see Enright, Francis James. 1990. To leave this port. Orick, Calif: Enright Pub. Co. Stindt, Fred A. 1982. Matson's century of ships. Kelseyville, California (3382 Riviera West Dr., Kelseyville 95451): F.A. Stindt. Tex Tickner, from 2/4 Pioneer Battalion on board, was injured during aerial bombing at sea on 16 February 1942 he was on the Mauna Loa and "got a piece of a bomb fragment in the belly and passed away 25 February 1942 aged 22". Manuel da Silva, a crewman of Mauna Loa was also wounded in the attack. Da Silva died aboard the USS Houston, and was buried in Gardens Road cemetery.
Australian Army	2	2	Jack Dee, who died of illness aboard the Manunda and Roy Gardiner who was the unnamed soldier who was shot at the Berrimah Hospital
RAAF	6	7	Albert Shultz was the "unidentified" seventh body at the RAAF base
US Army (including US Army Air Force)	7	9	Corporal Floyd Bauer (39152969) 148th Field Artillery, died of wounds aboard the Manunda on 23 February 1942 and was buried at sea. S/Sgt. Hugh McTavish (6549162), 11th Squadron, 7th Bombardment Group, died when his Liberator bomber was destroyed on the ground
Civilians in the town	14	16	Northern Territory Library Roll of Honour
Civilians on the wharf	39	23	Northern Territory Library Roll of Honour. George Michaels is the often uncounted 23rd Warfie
Don Isidro; Florence D; PBY Catalina flying boat (US Navy)	15	16	Lt. Joseph Kane of 453rd Ordnance Company, stationed on the Don Isidro, died of gangrene on 26 February 1942
			Omitted from Alderman's estimates
USS William B. Preston		14	The "fifteenth" crew member was probably Joseph Shuler, Aviation Metalsmith 2nd Class (356-12-85), who died on Moorer's Catalina from Patwing 10/22. The Preston was a seaplane tender for the Patrol Wing 10, which had been reinforced with aircraft from Patwing 22 United States Naval historical Research Centre, Washington Navy Yard. USS William B. Preston. Ship's Log in Lewis, Tom (1986–1993), Tom Lewis Manuscript Collection, in possession of Northern Territory Library, Darwin
HMAS Kangaroo		1	Norman Richard Moore (S3584)
Total	243	236	(Most of the authors cited elsewhere in this article do not cite the primary source documents used to annotate this table.)

The number of people killed during the 19 February raids is disputed. The Lowe Commission, which investigated them in March 1942, estimated 243 victims but, assuming a few were unidentified, concluded "I am satisfied that the number is approximately 250 and I doubt whether any further investigation will result in ascertaining a more precise figure".

Some researchers and government officials, including John Bradford (author of In the Highest Traditions – RAN Heroism Darwin 19 February 1942), Dr. Peter Stanley (the Australian War Memorial's Principal Historian and author of several books about Australian military history), Tom Womack (author of The Dutch Naval Air Force against Japan), Paul Rosenzweig (author of Darwin 1942: a reassessment of the first raid casualties), and Rear Admiral Kevin Scarce (governor of South Australia) have said there were 250–262 fatalities.

However, a plaque unveiled in Darwin in 2001 gave the total as 292. The plaque indicated 10 sailors had been killed aboard the USS William B. Preston but the US Navy said there were 13 fatalities and Peter Grose, author of An Awkward Truth, said fifteen – he wrote: "With the William B. Preston total corrected to 15, a figure of 297 known dead is the best count anyone is likely to achieve...the full death toll is likely to be a little over 300, perhaps as many as 310 or 320." Lewis and Ingman have revised that to 14 in their 2013 book Carrier Attack.

In 2000, Darwin historian Peter Forrest, who spoke to survivors and researched the attacks for an unpublished book, said (as paraphrased by a journalist), "the first Japanese air raids on Darwin probably killed more than double the official figure of 243", but by 2002 had lowered his estimate to "anything up to double that 243".

Other estimates put the toll far higher: one soldier who was there claimed to have seen barges filled with bodies towed out to sea, a member of one of the burial teams recounted seeing uncounted bodies "shoved in a large hole dug by a bulldozer" (paraphrased), according to some sources, former Darwin Mayor (1921–1922) Jack Burton estimated 900 people were killed; Harry Macredie, who helped rescue survivors and recover bodies in the harbour said, "we definitely estimate over 1,000", Rex Ruwoldt, one of the soldiers attacked that day, says that a few days after the raid he was told over the field telephone that Army Intelligence estimated 1,100 were killed. According to an AP article about the 50th anniversary of the attacks "some estimates say as many as 1,000 died". Bradford and Forrest said they spoke to survivors who estimated as many as 1,500 people died.

Stanley, Grose, Rosenzweig, and Tom Lewis rejected such numbers. The former said "it was certainly not the 1,024 claimed recently in unsubstantiated reports" and Grose wrote "numbers such as 1,100 are fancifully high".

By contrast, there is less dispute over the number of injured during the attacks. The Lowe Commission estimated "between 300 and 400" people were wounded. Lewis said the number was over 400, about 200 of which were seriously injured. Womack wrote that 311 were wounded. Australian military historian Chris Coulthard-Clark put the total between 250 and 320. Grose wrote: "if 900 or 1100 died, why were the numbers of injured so low? The count of the injured is more accurate, because they were treated in hospital or shipped out aboard the Manunda [a hospital ship]. The hospitals and Manunda noted names and numbers of those they treated."

=== Myths and inaccuracies ===
The Japanese raid was unlike the attack on Pearl Harbor in that it was launched against a nation that had already declared war on Japan (on 8 December 1941). It was similar in that it was a successful aerial surprise attack on a naval target that came as a great shock to the attacked nation. While the number of bombs dropped on Darwin (681 bombs weighing 114,100 kilograms (251,500 lb) by 205 bombers) exceeded those dropped on Pearl Harbor (457 bombs [including 40 torpedoes]) weighing 133,560 kilograms (294,450 lb) by 273), loss of life was much greater at Pearl Harbor (more than 2,400 people) than Darwin (236 people) due to the presence of capital ships and the catastrophic loss of a single battleship, the USS Arizona, and its 1,177 men.

A frequently repeated myth is that the Australian government downplayed the damage from the bombing raids on Darwin, in a "cover-up". The newspapers of the day disprove this claim. On the day of the attack the prime minister is quoted on the front pages of most newspapers: "Damage to property was considerable", he said, "but reports so far to hand do not give precise particulars about the loss of life." "The Government regards the attacks as most grave, and makes it quite clear that a severe blow has been struck on Australian soil."

== Further Japanese raids ==
After the 19 February 1942 Japanese raid, the Northern Territory and parts of Western Australia's north were bombed approximately 100 times between 4 March 1942 and 12 November 1943. One of the heaviest attacks took place on 16 June 1942 when a Japanese force set fire to the oil fuel tanks around the harbour and inflicted severe damage to the vacant banks, stores and railway yards. The Allied navies largely abandoned the naval base at Darwin after the initial 19 February attack, dispersing most of their forces to Brisbane, Fremantle, and other, smaller, seaports. Conversely, Allied air commanders launched a build-up in the Darwin area, building more airfields and deploying many squadrons.

The four IJN aircraft carriers (Akagi, Kaga, Hiryū, and Sōryū) that participated in the Bombing of Darwin were later sunk during the Battle of Midway in June 1942.

== Commemoration and depictions in popular culture ==
A memorial ceremony has been held every year since at least 2009. On 19 February at the Cenotaph in Darwin, at 9:58 am, a World War II air-raid siren sounds to mark the precise time of the first attack.

A fictionalised version of the raid features prominently in the 2008 film Australia.

== See also ==
- Axis naval activity in Australian waters
- Battle for Australia
- Christmas Island Invasion
- Shelling of Newcastle
- Darwin Military Museum
- Gunner (dog)
- Hajime Toyoshima
- List of shipwrecks in February 1942
- Proposed Japanese invasion of Australia during World War II
- Fujita salvage operation
- Naval Base Darwin
