= WATO =

WATO may refer to:

- WATO (FM), a radio station in Tennessee, United States
- WATO (AM), a defunct radio station in Tennessee, United States
- The World at One, a BBC news programme
- We Are the Ocean, an English alternative rock band
- Komodo International Airport (ICAO code WATO), Flores, Indonesia
- HMAS Wato, Australian tug boat in World War II
- WATO (software), a web administration application, part of the Check_MK software
- What Are the Odds, a software tool used in genealogy research
- wato or watu was a village of the Kwikwasut'inuxw group of Kwakwaka'wakw at the head of Thompson Sound (British Columbia), Canada
