= HMAS Southern Cross =

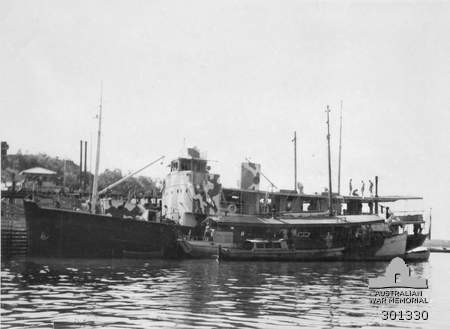
- HMAS Southern Cross at Darwin during July 1942. The lugger HMAS Griffioen is moored alongside her

History

Australia
- Name: Southern Cross
- Namesake: the Southern Cross
- Owner: Melanesian Mission of the Anglican Church
- Builder: Cammell Laird & Company, Birkenhead, England
- Yard number: 994
- Launched: 4 July 1933
- Fate: Requisitioned by Royal Australian Navy in 1941

Australia
- Name: Southern Cross
- Acquired: 29 March 1941
- In service: 18 June 1941

General characteristics
- Tonnage: 298 GRT
- Length: 34 m (112 ft) LPP
- Beam: 8.7 m (29 ft)
- Propulsion: 1 diesel engine
- Speed: 8 knots (15 km/h; 9.2 mph)
- Armament: 1 x 4-inch gun

HMAS Southern Cross was an examination vessel, stores and troop carrier of the Royal Australian Navy (RAN) during the Second World War. Built in 1933 for the Melanesian Mission of the Anglican Church, she was requisitioned by the RAN on 29 March 1941 and commissioned on 18 June 1941.

== Description ==
Southern Cross was a yacht that was launched as yard number 994 on 4 July 1933 by Cammell Laird & Company in Birkenhead, England. She had been ordered by the England-based Melanesian Mission Trust Ltd. Southern Cross was a 298-ton vessel that had a length between perpendiculars (LPP) of 34 m (112 ft), a beam of 8.7 m (29 ft) and was powered by a diesel engine.

== Wartime Service ==
=== Deployment to Darwin ===
Southern Cross with HMAS Kiara in company sailed from Sydney on 29 June 1941 for Darwin by way of the Queensland ports of Brisbane, Gladstone, Townsville, Cairns, Cooktown, and Thursday Island reaching Darwin on the evening of 1 August. Southern Cross took Kiara in tow on 1 July when one of that ship's engines failed until moderating weather allowed Kiara to proceed on one engine until Brisbane was reached on 3 July where repairs were made to Kiara's engine. The ships sailed 6 July for Gladstone but another engine failure in Kiara required towing and taking an inshore route to avoid heavy seas offshore. On 9 July, after fueling, the ships departed Gladstone for Townsville with further engine breakdowns and towing during that transit. On reaching Townsville Kiara was placed on a slip for repairs and both ships were painted. On 15 July both ships sailed for Cairns, reached 16 July, where more engine repairs were made to Kiara's port engine and minor fire damage to wiring repaired in Southern Cross. After a picnic sponsored by the Cairns Junior Auxiliary Anzac Club and taking on extra fuel the ships departed 21 July for Thursday Island where Kiara took on fuel from the reserve in Southern Cross. On 27 July the ships sailed for Darwin but overheating in Southern Cross's starboard engine on 28 July required a stop and some repairs. At anchorage at Elcho Island the next day Kiara was fueled again from reserves in Southern Cross before the ships departed for Darwin. On 1 August the ships arrived at Darwin.

=== Darwin ===
Southern Cross, one of the vessels working the Darwin boom defense, was stationed near the boom when the Japanese bombed the port on 19 February 1942. In the attack Southern Cross rescued survivors of USS Peary (DD-226) and then took off wounded from the beached Portmar and assisted the damaged Admiral Halsted.

From 9 to 14 July 1942, in company with HMAS Warrnambool, Southern Cross transported Netherlands East Indies troops and supplies to the Aru Islands. The ships sailed from Darwin at 3 a.m., 9 July, with troops of "Plover" force. After crossing the Arafura Sea the ships arrived off Dobo on at 2 a.m., 12 July and entered the harbor to land the force without opposition. Discharge of troops and cargo was completed on 13 July and Darwin was reached on 14 July.

On 28 July Southern Cross with HMAS Chinampa departed Darwin with Australian troops bound for Saumlaki but Japanese forces landed there on 30 July with occupation forces. The small Dutch force there mistook the Japanese ships for the Australian ships and were overrun before the Australian forces arrived. After successful landings the Japanese ships withdrew. Southern Cross suffered an engine casualty and was delayed with Chinampa entering the occupied harbor alone and attempting an unsuccessful landing. On arrival of Southern Cross both ships attempted to land the force but were met by heavy fire and withdrew. Both ships arrived with the troops at Darwin on 2 August 1942.
