= Australian stores lighter Yampi Lass =

History

Australia
- Name: S.B.C; Yampi Lass
- Owner: Swan Brewery; Yampi Sound Mining Company
- Operator: Royal Australian Navy (194?-1943)

Yampi Lass was a stores lighter of the Royal Australian Navy (RAN) during World War II.

Built as a scow, S.B.C was used by the Swan Brewery and transported beer down the Swan River. She was bought by the Yampi Sound Mining Company and used to transport stores to their mine on Koolan Island.

She was requisitioned by the RAN during World War II, however she was never commissioned. While at HMAS Melville, Darwin she was sunk during a storm inside Darwin Harbour on 11 April 1943. Salvaged in October 1945, she was sold for £15 10s.

During the war, she was used to resupply the Australian commando forces operating in Timor, with supplies including ammunition, currency, and miscellaneous items. She was disguised as a native trader and her crew were selected on the basis of their similarity to the native population.
