= SS Zealandia (1910) =

Australian cargo and passenger steamship sunk in the bombing of Darwin

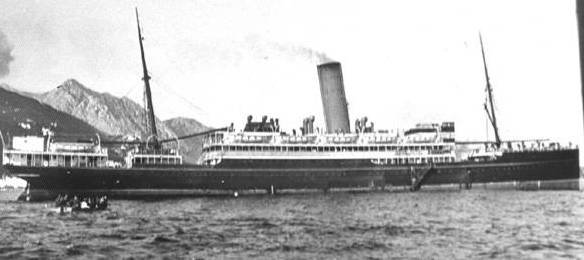
- Zealandia off Port Davey, Tasmania in 1933 (Photograph by Henry Allport)

History

Australia
- Name: Zealandia
- Namesake: New Zealand
- Owner: Huddart Parker
- Port of registry: Melbourne
- Builder: John Brown & Company, Clydebank
- Yard number: 392
- Launched: 20 November 1909
- Completed: May 1910
- In service: 1910
- Out of service: 1942
- Identification: Official number 120764; Code letters TVPW (until 1933); Call sign VJLK (from 1934)
- Nickname(s): "Z" or "Zed"
- Fate: Sunk in air raids on Darwin, 19 February 1942

General characteristics
- Tonnage: 6,683 GRT; tonnage under deck 5,274; 3,435 NRT
- Length: 410.3 feet (125.1 m) p/p
- Beam: 54.7 feet (16.7 m)
- Draught: 24 feet 2 inches (7.4 m)
- Depth: 23.4 feet (7.1 m)
- Installed power: 1,157 NHP
- Propulsion: 2 quadruple expansion engines, twin screws
- Speed: 15 knots (28 km/h)
- Troops: 800 troops and 1,800 tons of supplies (typical, as troopship)
- Crew: 144

SS Zealandia, nicknamed "Z" (or "Zed"), was an Australian cargo and passenger steamship. She served as a troopship in both World War I and World War II. Zealandia transported the Australian 8th Division. Her crew were the last Allied personnel to see HMAS Sydney, which was lost with all hands in 1941. Zealandia was sunk in the air raids on Darwin of 19 February 1942.

== Building ==
John Brown & Company of Clydebank, Scotland, built Zealandia for Huddart Parker & Co of Melbourne, launching her on 20 November 1909 and completing her in May 1910. She had 21 corrugated furnaces with a total grate area of 433 square feet (40 m^{2}) heating seven single-ended boilers with a total heating surface of 17,775 square feet (1,651 m^{2}). They supplied steam at 215 lb_{f}/in^{2} to two four-cylinder quadruple expansion engines, each of which drove one of her twin screws.

== Early civilian service ==
In 1910–13, she was chartered by the Union Steam Ship Company of New Zealand mainly for use on the trans-Tasman route, but also undertaking voyages to ports as distant as Fremantle and Vancouver. Huddart Parker then used Zealandia on the Melbourne–Fremantle route.

== World War I ==
In May 1918, Zealandia was requisitioned as an Allied troopship. She was among the ships used to transport the American Expeditionary Force from the east coast of the United States to France. After the armistice, she carried troops on the Liverpool–Sydney route. In 1919, she resumed her commercial role with Huddart Parker.

== World War II ==
On 29 June 1940, Zealandia embarked part of the 8th Division, the 2/21st Battalion, later known as Gull Force, at Sydney and took it and other units to Darwin.

Zealandia transported another part of the 8th Division, Lark Force (otherwise known as the 2/22nd Battalion), to Rabaul, leaving Sydney on 19 April 1941. Following that voyage, Zealandia went to Noumea, New Caledonia and transported Free French troops to Sydney.

In mid-1941, Zealandia took the main body of the 8th Division, their stores, and equipment to Singapore, where the main body of the 8th was surrendered to Japanese forces in February 1942.

After several other war-related voyages, in November 1941 Zealandia visited several Australian ports en route to Singapore. They left Melbourne on 2 November. A labour dispute involving some crew members caused her and HMAS Sydney to be delayed in leaving Fremantle, whence Sydney escorted Zealandia to Sunda Strait. Zealandia's crew were the last Allied personnel known to have seen Sydney, which was sunk by the German auxiliary cruiser Kormoran and lost with all hands when she attempted to stop the Kormoran.

Zealandia also took another 8th Division detachment, Sparrow Force, to Timor, departing Darwin with 957 troops the morning of 10 December 1941 escorted by HMAS Westralia with another 445 troops that reached Koepang on 12 December. On 20 December, the ship departed Darwin with 207 women and 357 children as the first of several ships to evacuate civilians from Darwin to southern Australia.

In Sydney, the ship was fitted with material to protect her oil tanks in the event of an attack. On 23 January, she left Sydney, transporting an anti-tank company and its equipment to Darwin, where it arrived on 6 February.

=== Sinking ===
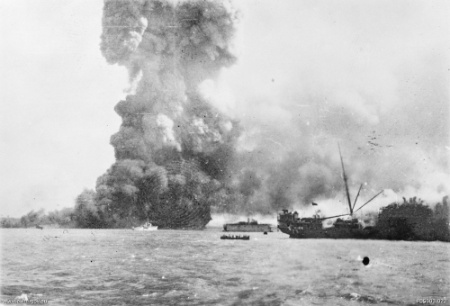
A lifeboat (centre) pulls away from Zealandia (right), as Neptuna explodes in the background

In the air raids of 19 February 1942, a number of bombs fell close to Zealandia, then one fell through a hatch and exploded in a hold, causing a serious fire. Japanese planes also attacked Zealandia with cannon and machine-gun fire. Ammunition in one hold started to explode and the ship's fire pumps were disabled by another bomb. The order was given to abandon ship.

Zealandia sank, leaving only her masts clear of the water. Two crew members died from wounds sustained in the attack. 142 crew members survived.

The ship was salvaged in 1960 during the Fujita salvage operation. What remains of Zealandia lies in Darwin Harbour at position 12°29.00′S 130°51.05′E at a depth of 19 metres (62 ft), and is a recreational dive site.
