= MV British Motorist =

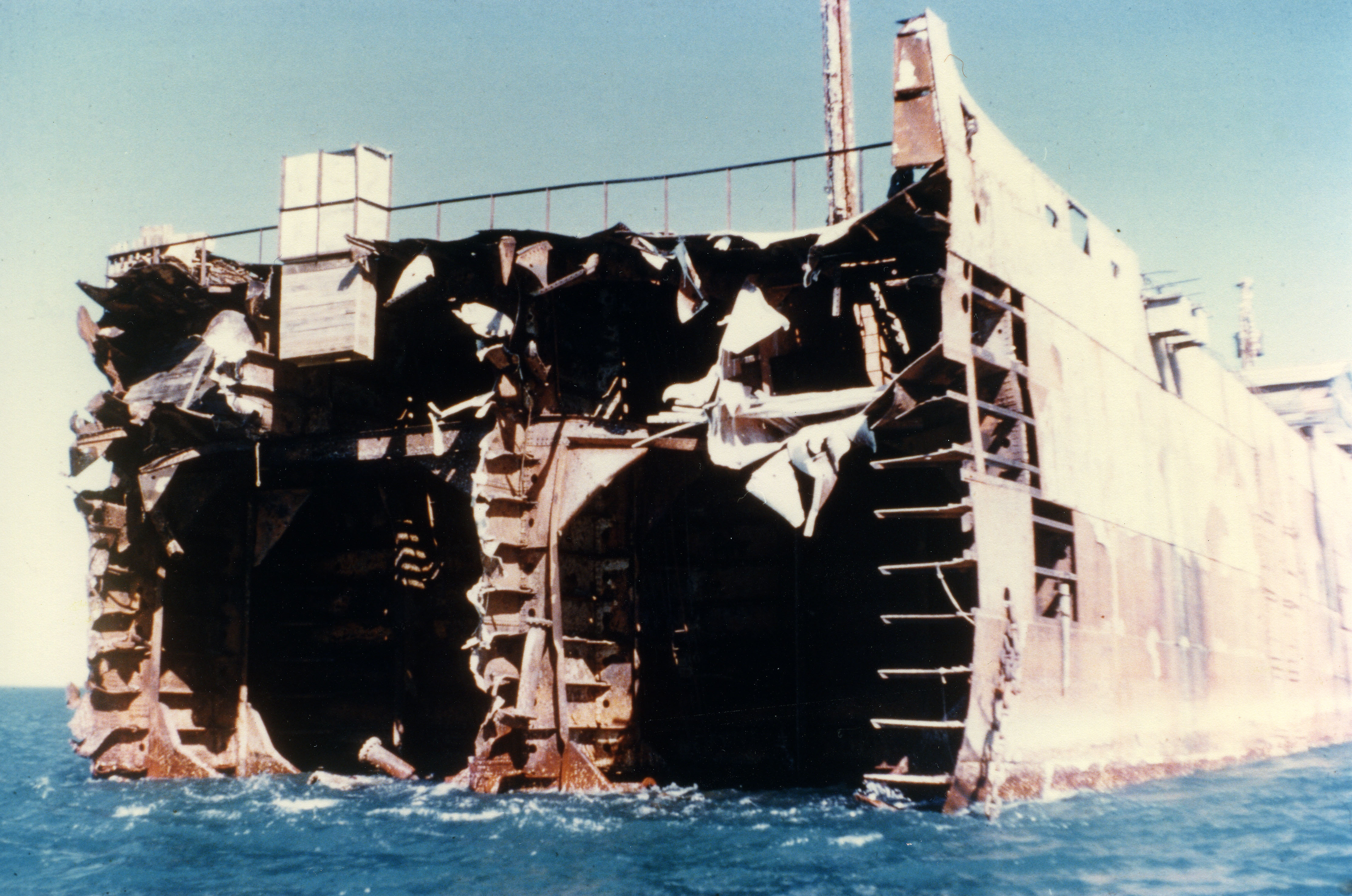
- MV British Motorist, salvaged in Darwin Harbour

History

United Kingdom
- Name: MV British Motorist
- Operator: British Tanker Company Ltd.
- Builder: Swan Hunter & Wigham Richardson, Newcastle upon Tyne
- Yard number: 1162
- Launched: 14 August 1924
- Fate: Sunk, 19 February 1942; Salvaged 1959, broken up 1960.

General characteristics
- Type: Oil tanker
- Tonnage: 6,891 GRT
- Length: 440 ft 3 in (134.19 m)
- Beam: 57 ft (17 m)
- Draught: 33 ft 10 in (10.31 m)
- Propulsion: Oil engine, 2SCSA, 8cyl (24 x 50ins), 796nhp, Single screw
- Crew: 61

MV British Motorist was a 6,891 ton tanker, built by Swan Hunter & Wigham Richardson, Newcastle upon Tyne in 1924 for the British Tanker Company.

While under charter to the merchant navy, she was in port in Darwin, Australia when on 19 February 1942, she was hit by two bombs during the Japanese air raid on Darwin and was sunk, resting in 18–20 metres (59–66 ft) of water. She had been carrying oil, aviation fuel and petrol and was refuelling USS Peary when the raid commenced.

Two of her crew were killed out of 61 in the initial attack: the master Gilbert C. Bates and 2nd Radio Operator James H. Webster.

In 1959–1960, she was salvaged by Fujita Salvage Company, with the fore and aft sections of the hull welded together while the engine room was left, as it was too heavy to refloat. The welded fore and aft was towed back to Japan and broken up.

What remains of British Motorist lies in Darwin Harbour at position 12°28.96′S 130°50.33′E.
