= Yoshikazu Nagahama =

Fighter ace during World War II

- 長浜 芳和
- Born: 1921; Fukuoka Prefecture, Empire of Japan
- Died: 6 September 1943; Empire of Japan
- Military career
- Allegiance: Empire of Japan
- Branch: Imperial Japanese Navy Air Service (IJN)
- Units: Kaga; Zuikaku
- Conflicts: World War II; Attack on Pearl Harbor; Attack on Darwin; Indian Ocean Raid; Battle of Midway; Battle of the Eastern Solomons; Battle of the Santa Cruz Islands; Solomon Islands Campaign

Yoshikazu Nagahama (長浜 芳和, Nagahama Yoshikazu; 1921 – 6 September 1943) was a fighter ace in the Imperial Japanese Navy (IJN) during World War II. He became ace in a day during the Attack on Darwin, where he first destroyed one US Navy PBY Catalina flying boat and then single-handedly engaged five, and shot down four, US Army Air Force P-40 Warhawk fighters.

== Early career ==
Yoshikazu Nagahama enrolled in the navy enlisted pilot training in 1938 and graduated from it at the end of 1939. He was eventually promoted to petty officer and assigned to the fighter squadron on carrier Kaga.

== Pacific War ==
In December 1941, Petty Officer First Class Nagahama participated in the Attack on Pearl Harbor, flying a Mitsubishi A6M Zero fighter in the second wave. On 19 February 1942, he participated in the Attack on Darwin and provided escort for the bombers. On the way to the target, near Bathurst Island, he encountered a single US Navy PBY Catalina flying boat, which he attacked and shot down. While doing so, he got separated from the main formation, as well as his own flight. He proceeded directly towards Darwin alone while the strike force made a turn in order to attack the port from the south. He arrived over the city ahead of the strike force and five US Army Air Force P-40 Warhawk fighters led by Lieutenant Robert Oestreicher intercepted him. In the ensuing air combat, he single-handedly shot down four of them (Lieutenant Oestreicher being the only survivor), before strafing two more flying boats moored in the port.

In April, Petty Officer Nagahama participated in the Indian Ocean Raid. On 4 June, he was involved in the Battle of Midway, where he was the first part of an escort for the strike force against Midway Island in the morning. Upon his return, he was sent back into the air to defend IJN carriers a mere half hour after he landed. The Japanese combat air patrol (CAP), of which he was a part, completely annihilated US Navy Douglas TBD Devastator torpedo bombers from carrier Hornet. Nevertheless, his own carrier Kaga was sunk by Douglas SBD Dauntless dive bombers soon afterwards.

After the Battle of Midway, Petty Officer Nagahama was transferred to carrier Zuikaku. In August 1942, he moved to the Solomons area and participated in the Battle of the Eastern Solomons, where he shared credit for destroying an enemy flying boat over Zuikaku during CAP. In late October, he participated in the Battle of the Santa Cruz Islands, where he was part of the fighter escort led by Lieutenant Ayao Shirane, which covered the strike force against US carriers. In the air combat over the US fleet, he shared a claim to several Grumman F4F Wildcat fighters destroyed. It is very likely that he shot down the one flown by Lieutenant Paul Landry.

Afterwards, Petty Officer Nagahama was transferred to Japan and assigned to Tsuiki Air Group. He was killed in a flying accident on 6 September 1943. His final score was ten or 13 aircraft shot down, depending on the sources.
