= HMAS Wato =

Australian Tug Boat used in WWII

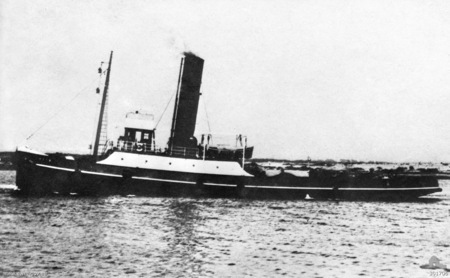
- Wato just prior to being requisitioned by the Royal Australian Navy.

History

Australia
- Name: Wato
- Owner: Adelaide Steam Tug Company
- Builder: J. T. Eltringham & Company
- Launched: 14 July 1904

History

Australia
- Name: Wato
- Commissioned: 11 May 1941
- Decommissioned: 12 November 1945
- Honours and awards: Battle honours: Darwin 1942
- Fate: Returned to owners; scrapped 1955

General characteristics
- Type: Tug boat
- Tonnage: 292 GRT
- Length: 125 ft (38 m)
- Beam: 23.7 ft (7.2 m)
- Depth: 12.4 ft (3.8 m)
- Installed power: Triple expansion steam 182 hp (136 kW)
- Armament: 2 × .303-inch Vickers machine gun

HMAS Wato (W127) was a tug boat operated by the Royal Australian Navy (RAN) during World War II. During World War I she was operated by the Royal Navy in the Mediterranean Sea. She later operated as a tug boat for the Adelaide Steam Tug Company before being requisitioned by the RAN. She was scrapped in 1955.

== Operational history ==
Built by J. T. Eltringham & Company, South Shields in 1904 for the Adelaide Steam Tug Company and arrived in Australia in October 1904. Wato served with the Royal Navy in the Mediterranean during World War I.

After being requisitioned by the RAN on 11 May 1941, she was sent to Darwin, Northern Territory. During the Japanese air raid on Darwin on 19 February 1942 she pulled an oil lighter clear of Barossa, and then pulled Barossa away from the MV Neptuna, only moments before Neptuna exploded. As the war moved away from Australia, Wato operated around New Guinea until 1944 before being operated out of Sydney at the end of the war. The vessel earned a single battle honour, "Darwin 1942", for her wartime service.

She was returned to owners and was later scrapped in 1955.
