= HMAS Terka =

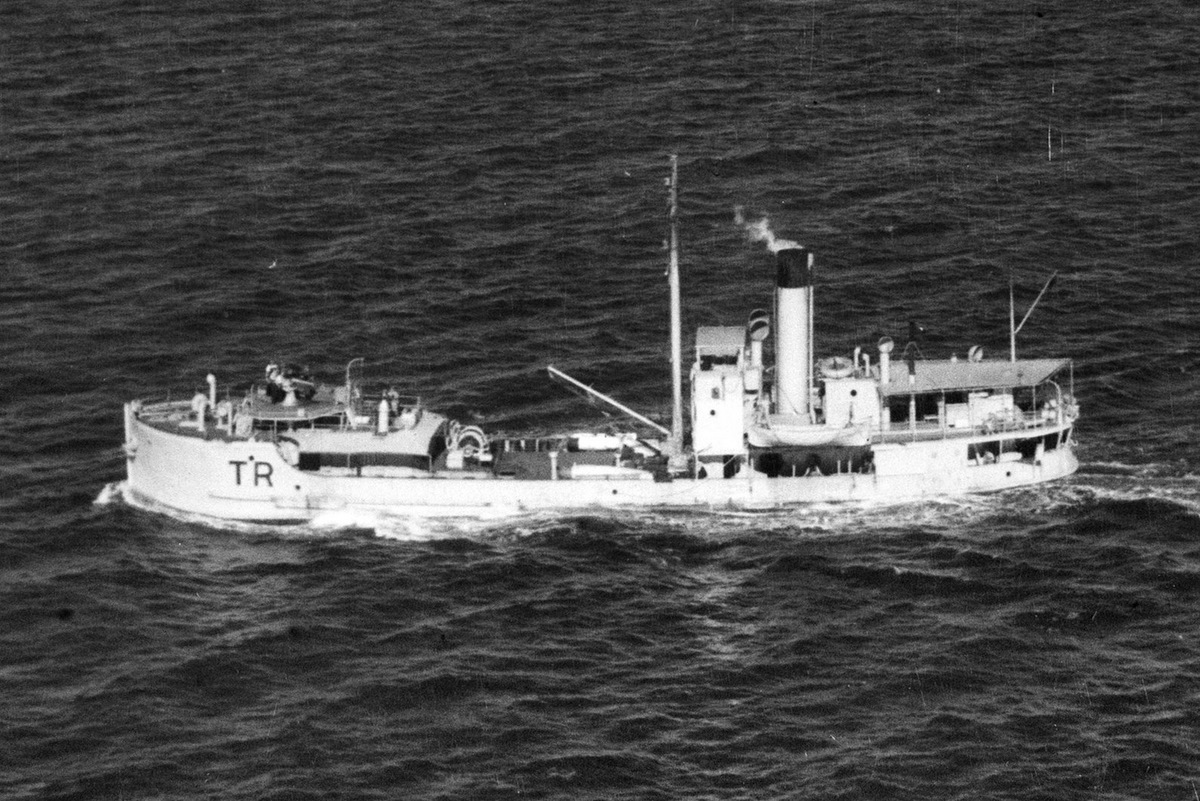
- HMAS Terka underway in April 1941, shortly after her conversion for naval service

History

United Kingdom
- Name: Sir Dudley de Chair; Terka
- Owner: Dorman, Long & Company then Adelaide Steamship Company
- Launched: 1925
- In service: 1928
- Out of service: 1940
- Fate: Requisitioned by RAN

Australia
- Name: Terka
- Commissioned: 31 January 1941
- Honours and awards: Battle honours: Darwin 1942–43
- Fate: Sunk on 26 March 1945

General characteristics
- Tonnage: 420 GRT
- Length: 147 ft (45 m)
- Beam: 26.6 ft (8 m)
- Depth: 9.2 ft (3 m)
- Armament: 1 × 12-pounder gun; 1 × 20 mm Oerlikon cannon; 1 × .303-inch Vickers machine gun

HMAS Terka (FY.98) was an auxiliary minesweeper operated by the Royal Australian Navy (RAN) during World War II. The ship was launched as Sir Dudley de Chair in 1925 as one of the three ships used to supply the construction of the Sydney Harbour Bridge, and from 1928 operated by the Adelaide Steamship Company until she was requisitioned by the RAN in December 1940. She sank while at her moorings at Madang, New Guinea on 26 March 1945 and was abandoned.

== Construction ==
The ship was launched in 1925 from the State Dockyard, Newcastle, New South Wales as Sir Dudley de Chair.

== Operation history ==
She was bought in 1928 by the Adelaide Steamship Company and renamed Terka. She was requisitioned by the RAN in December 1940 as part of Minesweeping Group 70 based at Darwin, Northern Territory. She was converted into a water carrier and moved forward to New Guinea to support the efforts during World War II. While moored at Madang, she sank on 26 March 1945 and was abandoned.

During May–June 1971, the wreck of HMAS Terka, in Binnen Harbour, Madang was blasted by Clearance Diving Team One (RAN), to allow safe navigation of the harbour channel.

Following an overhaul of the RAN battle honours system, completed in March 2010, Terka's wartime service was retroactively recognised with the honour "Darwin 194243".
