= Darwin Harbour =

Harbour in Northern Territory, Australia

Coordinates: 12°31′S 130°50′E

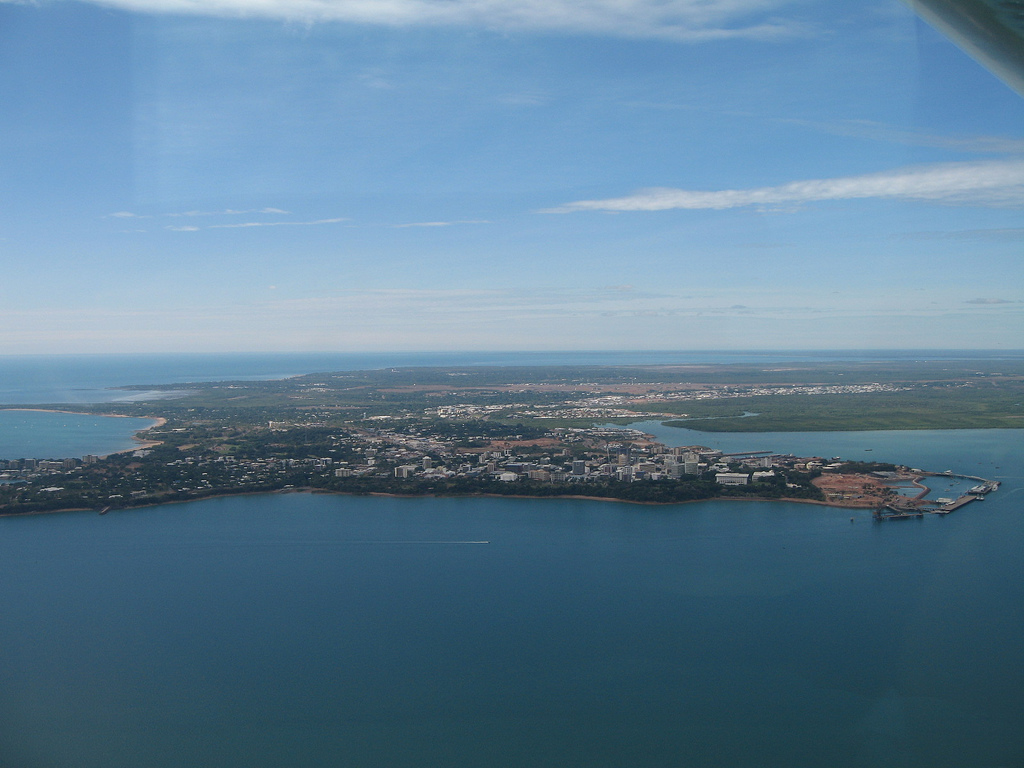
Looking towards the city over Darwin Harbour

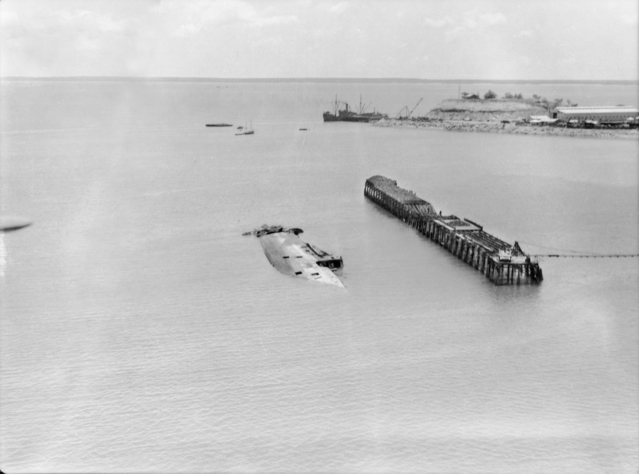
A sunken ship (MV Neptuna) and burnt-out wharf in Darwin Harbour following the attack on Darwin (AWM 027334)

Darwin Harbour is a body of water close to the city of Darwin in the Northern Territory of Australia. It is the traditional waterways of the Larrakia people.

It opens to the north at a line from Charles Point in the west to Lee Point in the east into the Beagle Gulf and connects via the Clarence Strait with the Van Diemen Gulf. It contains Port Darwin, which is flanked by Frances Bay to the east and Cullen Bay to the west.

== History ==
The Larrakia people are the Traditional Owners of Darwin Harbour who used canoes to navigate its waterway for fishing, trading and cultural purposes.

Despite having never visited the area, Darwin Harbour was named after naturalist Charles Darwin. It was named by his friend and former shipmate Lieutenant John Lort Stokes during HMS Beagle's third expedition on 9 September 1839.

Ships in Darwin Harbour were heavily bombed by the Japanese during World War II in February 1942, leaving numerous wrecks that were eventually salvaged up in the 1960s.

In 2015, plans to develop the Frances Bay harbor, including local landmarks "Duck Pond" and the "Gobi Desert", were announced. The Frances Bay Mooring Basin is protected by a set of locks, upgraded in 2024.

== Climate ==
The climate of the Darwin Harbour region is monsoon tropical with two distinct seasons: the Dry and the Wet. The Dry lasts for 6 months between April and September with an average rainfall of 24 mm, whereas the Wet lasts between October and March with an average monthly rainfall of 254 mm/month (according to the Bureau of Meteorology, 1999). The majority of the rain falls between December and April. Runoff varies between 250–1000 mm. Riverine discharge is relatively low with the exception of the Blackmore River and Elizabeth River. Peak flow for these rivers occurs in February, respectively 605Ml/day and 389 Ml/day, after which it slowly decreases until July when there is no freshwater input into Darwin Harbour until the onset of the following wet season (Padovan 1997). Cyclone frequency is low to moderate.

== Marine life ==
Darwin Harbour supports very high fish diversity with 415 fish species now known. Darwin Harbour provides a unique opportunity to see dugongs in the wild, because their favourite food is located off Casuarina and Bundilla (formerly Vesteys) beaches. Seagrass meadows are also the main diet of green turtles and provide habitats for many smaller marine animals including commercially important species such as prawns and fish.

== Oceanography ==
=== Currents ===
The tides at Port Darwin are macro-tidal with a maximum tidal range of 7.8 m, a mean spring range of 5.5 m and a mean neap range of 1.9 m (Padovan, 1997). The currents caused by these tides are complex and strong.

=== Estuaries ===
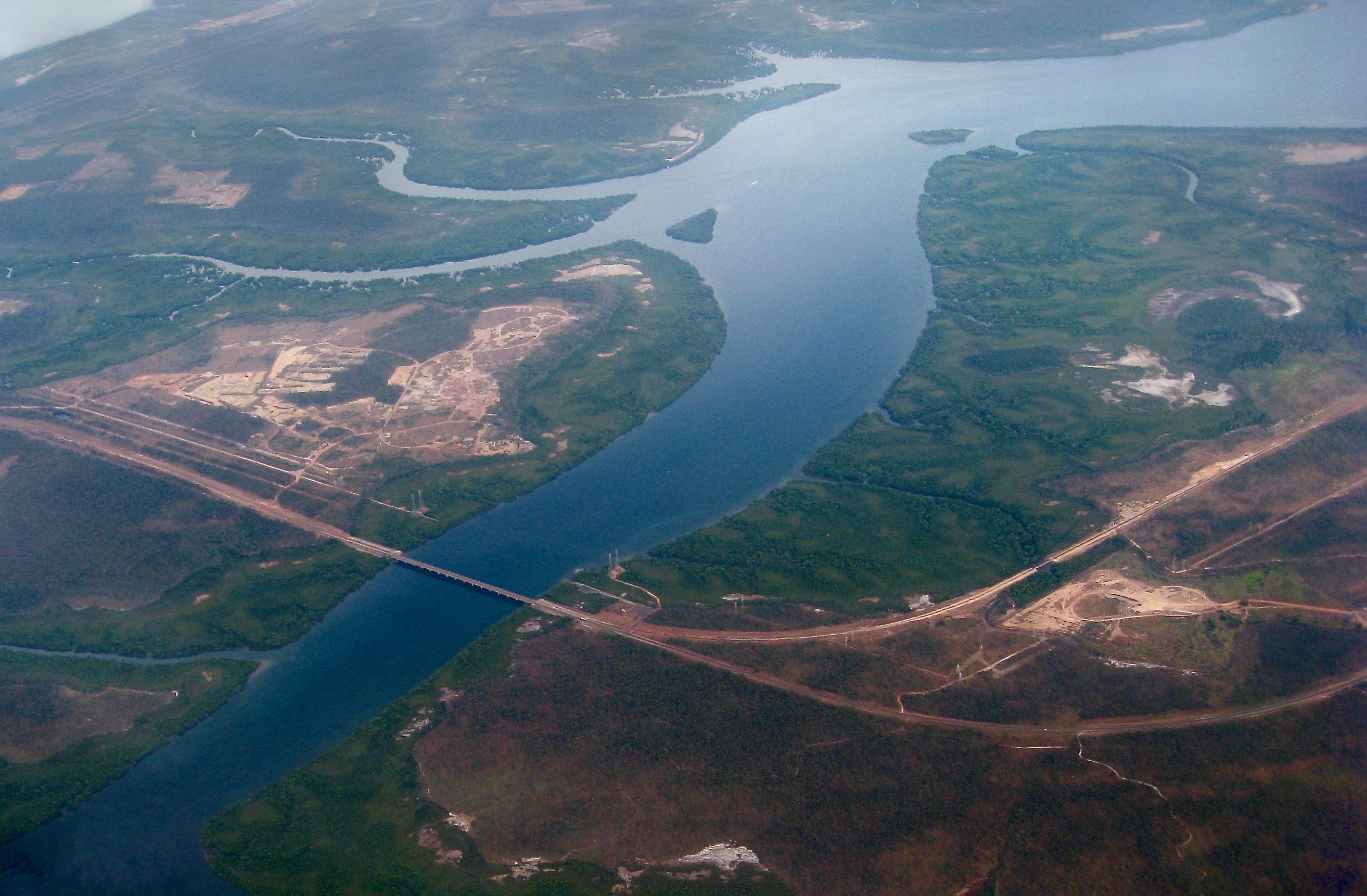
The Elizabeth River Bridge across Elizabeth River, upstream the East Arm of Darwin Harbour

Darwin Harbour is a drowned river valley and consist of ria shorelines and extensive headlands.

=== Catchment ===
The catchment of Darwin Harbour occupies a total area of approximately 3,230 square kilometres (1,247 sq mi), of this 2,010 square kilometres (776 sq mi) is land based and the other 1,220 square kilometres (471 sq mi) are estuarine areas at the high water mark.

=== Geology ===
The underlying lithology is dominated by Permian siltstones and sandstones.

== Administrative status ==
On 4 April 2007, the remainder of Darwin Harbour which was not already part of a suburb or a locality within the boundaries of either of the two local government areas, the City of Darwin and the Litchfield Municipality, was gazetted by the Northern Territory Government as a locality with the name, Darwin Harbour. Its north-western boundary aligns with that of the boundary for the Port of Darwin which extends from Charles Point in the west to Lee Point in the east. The locality has not been added to any existing local government area and is considered to be part of the Northern Territory's unincorporated areas.

== See also ==
- List of ports in Australia
- Middle Arm
- East Arm
- Lee Point
