= 1000-ton Floating Dock =

Class overview
- Builders: Evans Deakin & Company, Brisbane; Mort's Dock & Engineering Company, Sydney
- Operators: Royal Australian Navy
- Built: 1941–1944
- Completed: 2
- Retired: 2

General characteristics
- Type: Floating dry dock
- Length: 196.85 ft (60.00 m)
- Beam: 65.61 ft (20.00 m)
- Height: 25.26 ft (7.70 m)
- Draught: 7 ft 4 in (2.24 m)
- Capacity: 1,000 tons

The 1000-ton Floating Dock was a class of floating dry docks built for the Royal Australian Navy between 1940 and 1944.

== Design ==
The floating dry docks were 196.85 feet (60.00 m) in length, 65.61 feet (20.00 m) beam and 7.4 feet (2.3 m) draught. The floating docks had a lifting capacity of 1,000 tons.

== Floating Docks ==
- AD 1001, built by Evans Deakin & Company, launched on 24 April 1941 and completed on 3 October 1941. Sold by Hobsons Bay Dock and Engineering Co. to Seico Shipyard of Singapore in 1978.
- AD 1002, built by Mort's Dock & Engineering Company and completed in 1944. Currently operated by the Noakes Group, Berry Bay, Sydney.
