= HMAS Mavie =

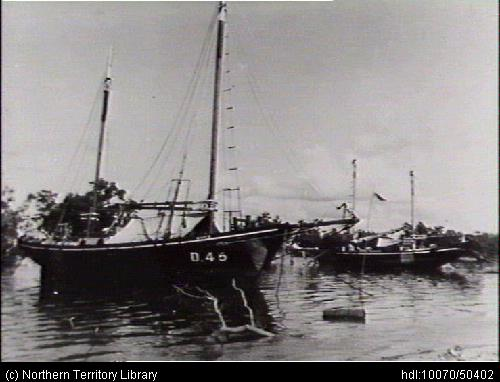
- Mavie (later HMAS Mavie) and other luggers resting in harbour during the 1939 storm season

History

Australia
- Name: Mavie
- Launched: 1903
- Acquired: 12 December 1941
- Commissioned: 31 December 1941
- Honors and awards: Battle honours: Darwin 1942
- Fate: Sunk 19 February 1942; scrapped 1959–1960

General characteristics
- Type: Patrol boat
- Displacement: 19 tons
- Length: 38 ft 6 in (11.73 m)
- Beam: 11 ft 11 in (3.63 m)
- Complement: 4

HMAS Mavie was a 19-ton auxiliary patrol boat operated by the Royal Australian Navy (RAN) during World War II.

The wooden lugger Mavie was built at Fremantle, Western Australia in 1903. It was 38 feet 6 inches (11.73 m) long, with a beam of 11 feet 11 inches (3.63 m).

On 12 December 1941, Mavie was seized from its Japanese owner, Jiro Muramats, as he was a citizen of a country at war with Australia. It was requisitioned by the RAN, and was renamed and commissioned for service at Darwin as the channel patrol boat HMAS Mavie, on 31 December 1941.

Mavie was attacked by Japanese aircraft in the air raids on Darwin on 19 February 1942, near the Stokes Hill Wharf in Darwin Harbour. Mavie was sunk by a near miss, although the crew of four survived. Mavie was salvaged in 1959–60 when the Fujita Salvage Company salvaged the cargo ship Neptuna, which had also been sunk in the raid.

Following a reorganisation of the RAN battle honours system, Mavie's service and loss was retroactively recognised with the honour "Darwin 1942".
