= Kelat (ship) =

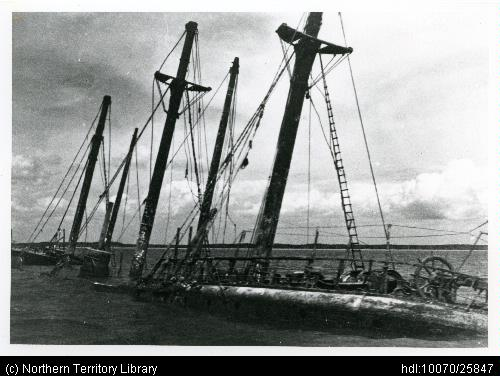
- The wreck of Kelat, 1942

History

United Kingdom
- Name: Kelat
- Owner: E. Bates and Sons (1881–1903)
- Port of registry: Liverpool
- Builder: Richardson, Duck and Company, Stockton-on-Tees
- Yard number: 274
- Launched: 31 March 1881
- Completed: May 1881
- Identification: 84103

Norway
- Name: Hövding
- Port of registry: Porsgrund
- Identification: KBHF

Australia
- Name: Kelat
- Operator: Royal Australian Navy
- In service: 1941
- Out of service: 1942
- Fate: Sunk during bomb raid on 19 February 1942, Darwin

General characteristics
- Type: Iron sailing ship
- Tonnage: 1894 gross register tons
- Length: 261 ft (80 m)
- Beam: 41 ft (12 m)
- Draught: 23 ft 5 in (7.14 m)
- Installed power: Sail (fully rigged three masted)

Kelat was an 1894 gross ton iron hulled fully rigged three masted sailing ship built in Stockton-on-Tees, England in 1881. She was requisitioned by the Royal Australian Navy (RAN) in 1941 and sank as a result of damage suffered during the Japanese air raid on Darwin on 19 February 1942.

== Construction and design ==
The vessel was built in 1881 by Richardson, Duck and Company at Stockton-on-Tees, England for E. Bates & Sons of Liverpool. She was an iron hulled fully rigged sailing ship consisting of three masts and two decks.

== Operational service ==
She plied the London to Australia cargo route until she was requisitioned in 1903 by L. Gundersen and renamed Hövding. She continued plying the cargo trade to Australia until she was damaged in a storm and condemned at Melbourne on 9 July 1914. She was sold as a hulk to Mcllwrath, McEachern Propriety Ltd, who converted her into a coal hulk. Sometime afterward she was renamed back to her original name Kelat. She was requisitioned as a coal hulk by the RAN in 1941.

== Fate ==
After being requisitioned by the RAN, she was towed from Fremantle to Darwin fully laden with coal in February 1942. She sank at her mooring several days after arriving in Darwin after being machine gunned and badly damaged during the Japanese air raid on Darwin on 19 February 1942. The sinking may have been by neglect as in the confusion after the raids it is possible no one remembered to continue to run her pumps to keep her afloat. Her wreck is located at 12°02′00″S 130°05′00″E.
