= USS Peary =

Clemson-class destroyer

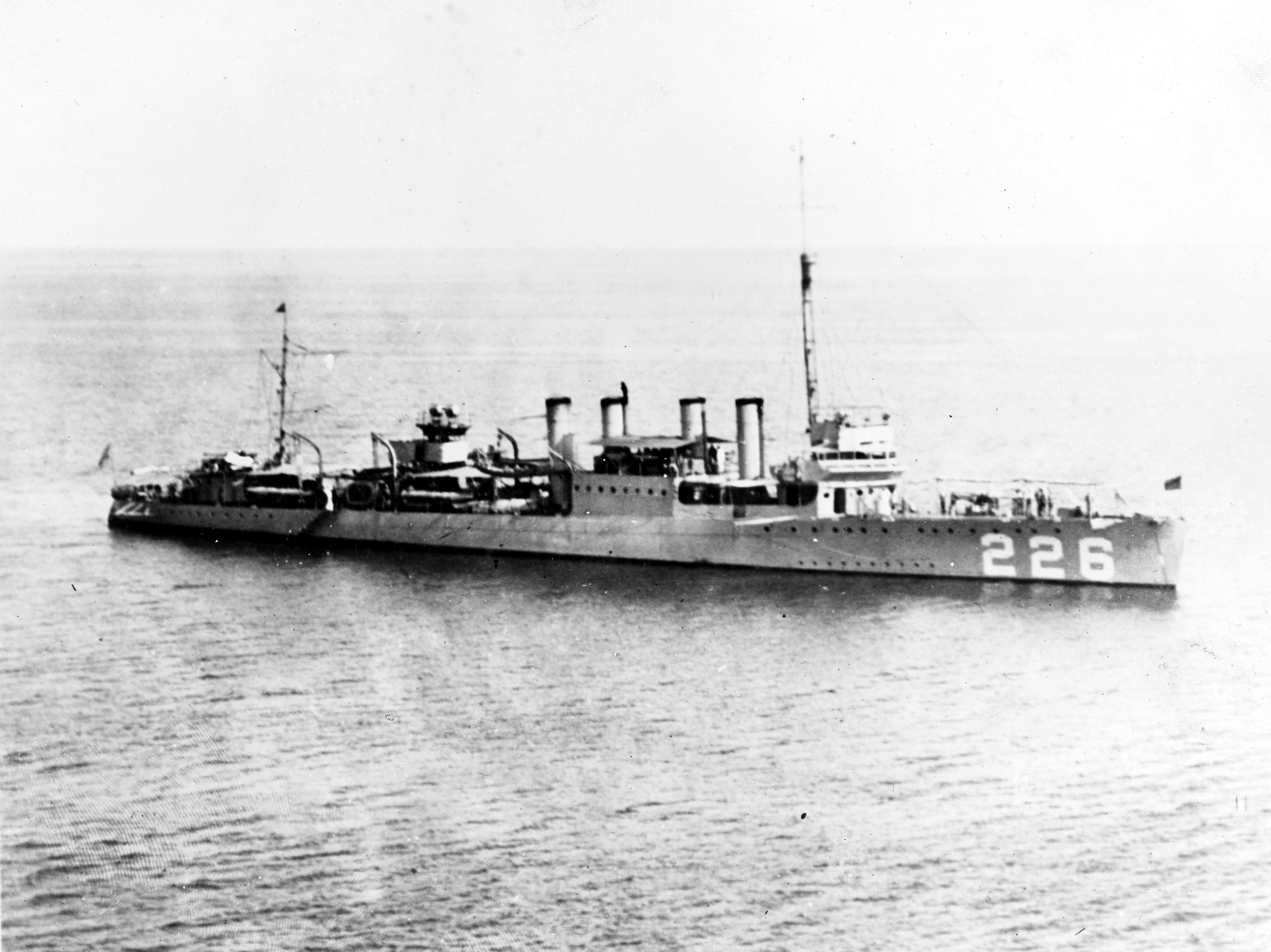
- USS Peary (DD-226) in the early 1920s

History

United States
- Name: USS Peary
- Namesake: Robert Edwin Peary
- Builder: William Cramp & Sons, Philadelphia
- Yard number: 492
- Laid down: 9 September 1919
- Launched: 6 April 1920
- Sponsored by: Mrs. Edward Stafford
- Commissioned: 22 October 1920
- Stricken: 8 May 1942
- Honors and awards: 1 battle star (World War II)
- Fate: Sunk in battle, 19 February 1942

General characteristics
- Class & type: Clemson-class destroyer
- Displacement: 1190 tons
- Length: 314 ft 4 in (95.81 m)
- Beam: 31 ft 9 in (9.68 m)
- Draft: 9 ft 3 in (2.82 m)
- Propulsion: geared turbines
- Speed: 35 knots (65 km/h)
- Complement: 142 officers and enlisted
- Armament: 4 × 4"/50 caliber guns; 1 × 3"/50 caliber gun; 12 × 21 inch (533 mm) torpedo tubes

USS Peary (DD-226) was a Clemson-class destroyer of the United States Navy. She was commissioned in 1920 and sunk by Japanese aircraft at Darwin, Northern Territory, Australia, on 19 February 1942.

== Construction and commissioning ==
Peary was laid down by William Cramp & Sons of Philadelphia on 9 September 1919. The destroyer was launched on 6 April 1920, sponsored by Mrs. Edward Stafford daughter of Admiral Peary. The vessel was commissioned on 22 October 1920.

== Service history ==
=== Pre-World War II ===
Peary served in the Far East from 1922 onward. With the Yangtze River Patrol from 1923 to 1931, she made annual deployments in Chinese waters protecting American interests from 1931 to the outbreak of World War II.

=== World War II ===
Peary was moored at Cavite, Philippines, when news of the Pearl Harbor raid reached her and was caught in the raid on the Cavite Navy Yard, Philippines, two days later. On the early afternoon of 10 December more than 50 two-engined high level bombers appeared over Cavite and, cruising leisurely above the range of anti-aircraft fire, destroyed practically the entire base.

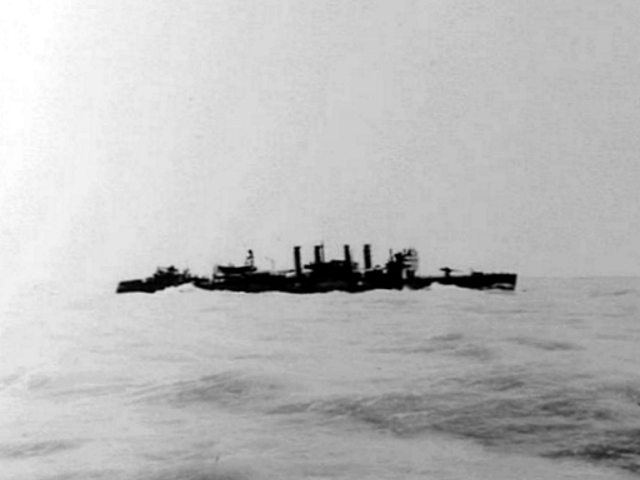
Peary in the Timor Sea, 1942

Peary, tied up at a small pier, took one bomb forward which damaged the superstructure and stack and killed eight of her crew. She found herself in a precarious position, as fires began to set off torpedo warheads in a torpedo overhaul shop on the wharf next to her. USS Whippoorwill towed her out. Whippoorwill and USS Pillsbury came alongside and their fire hoses extinguished the fire in five minutes. Her commanding officer, Commander H. H. Keith was wounded in this engagement and was relieved by Commander J. M. Bermingham.

On 26 December 1941, Peary was underway when the Japanese came over again and dropped several bombs near the ship.

By the morning of 27 December, Peary was in Campomanes Bay, Negros Island, where she decided to put in for the day. Her crew camouflaged her with green paint and palm fronds, hoping to elude Japanese patrol bombers. Five passed overhead without spotting the ship that morning and when darkness fell she set out through the Celebes Sea for Makassar Strait.

A Japanese bomber spotted Peary the next morning, and shadowed her until early afternoon when three other bombers joined her in a two-hour attack. The planes dropped 500-pound (230 kg) bombs and then launched two torpedoes only 500 yards (460 m) from the ship. Peary quickly backed on one engine and both torpedoes narrowly missed the bow. Seconds later, two more missed the stern by ten yards (9.1 m). The bombers then withdrew.

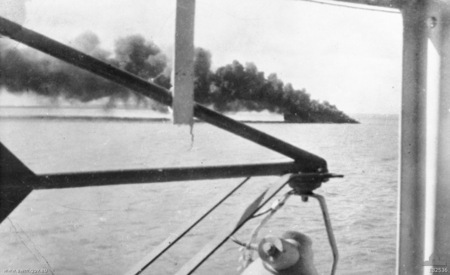
Peary sinking at Darwin, 19 February 1942.

The New Year found Peary at Darwin, Australia. During January and a part of February, she operated out of Darwin, principally on anti-submarine patrol. On 15–16 February, Peary took part in a mission to transport reinforcements and supplies to Allied forces in Dutch Timor, but this was aborted after coming under intense air attack. On 19 February 1942 Darwin experienced a massive Japanese air attack. Peary was attacked by Japanese dive bombers, and was struck by five bombs. The first bomb exploded on the fantail, the second, an incendiary, on the galley deck house; the third did not explode; the fourth hit forward and set off the forward ammunition magazines; the fifth, another incendiary, exploded in the after engine room. A .30 caliber machine gun on the after deck house and a .50 caliber machine gun on the galley deck house fired until the last enemy plane flew away.

Lost with the ship were 88 officers and men, including Bermingham. There were 53 enlisted survivors and one officer, LTJG R.L. Johnson. LT W.J. Catlett, who was ashore during Peary's final battle, was tasked with writing the official US Navy report on the sinking. Peary was the first destroyer of the Asiatic Fleet to be sunk in World War II. She was struck from the Navy List on 8 May 1942. In July 2020 an announcement was made by the Northern Territory government that the propellers from the ship had been found some kilometres from the known wreck site, prompting further investigation into Peary's final battle.

== Awards ==
- Yangtze Service Medal
- China Service Medal
- American Defense Service Medal with "Fleet" clasp
- Asiatic–Pacific Campaign Medal with one battle star
- World War II Victory Medal
- Philippine Defense Medal

== Present day ==
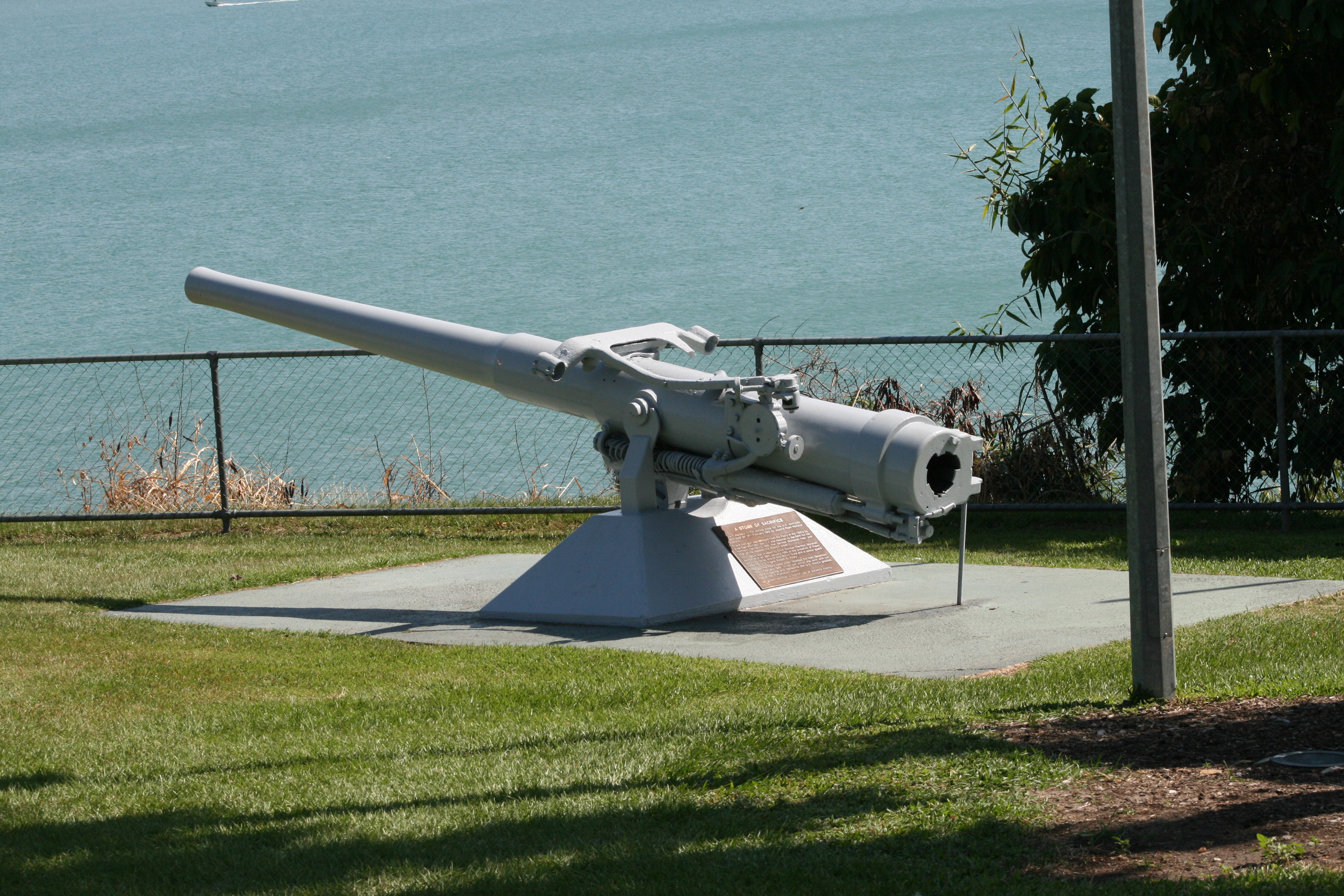
USS Peary Memorial in Darwin, Australia

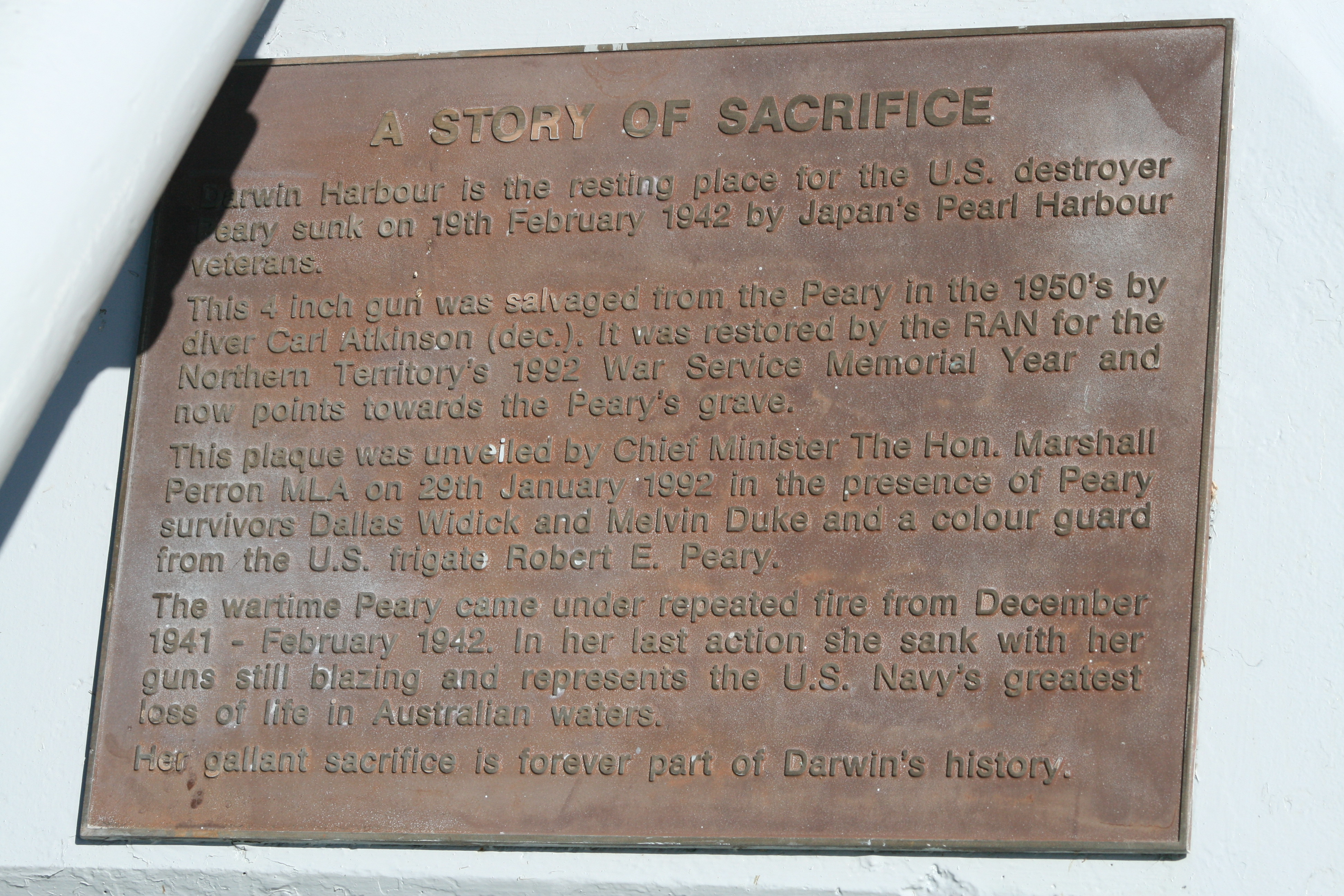
Plaque on USS Peary Memorial

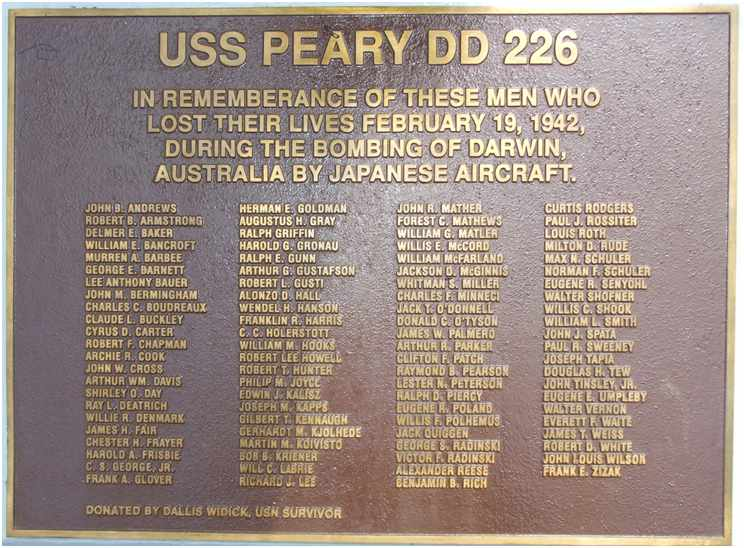
Roll of Honor – With some errors

=== Memorial ===
There is a memorial in Darwin in honor of the lives lost. This memorial, in Bicentennial Park, consists of a plaque and one of the 4-inch deck guns recovered from Peary. This gun is aimed towards Peary's resting place in the harbor. In the words of Peter Grose, author of An Awkward Truth: The Bombing of Darwin, February 1942, "The doomed yet magnificent reply by the destroyer USS Peary in Darwin harbour as Japanese dive-bombers swarmed around her deserves a place in the legend books of American military history". The memorial was visited by President Obama and Prime Minister Gillard on 17 November 2011, as part of a ceremony dedicated to the veterans of WWII, at the end of the 60th anniversary of ANZUS Presidential visit to Australia.

=== Wreck ===
Peary lies in 89 feet (27 m) of water in Darwin Harbour, at coordinates 12°28′30″S 130°49′45″E. The wreck itself is a memorial to those who lost their lives in the first bombing raid on Australian soil and to those who defended Darwin.
