= MV Neptuna =

Ship

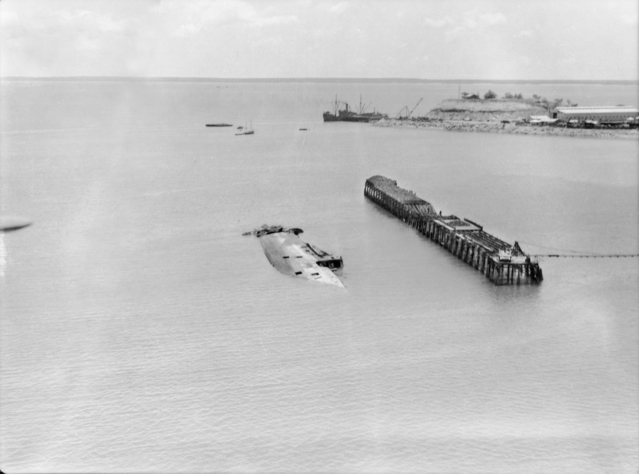
- Neptuna on her side in Darwin Harbour

History

Germany
- Name: MV Rio Panuco
- Namesake: Pánuco River, Mexico
- Operator: Flensburger Dampfer Co.
- Port of registry: Flensburg
- Builder: Friedrich Krupp Germaniawerft, Kiel
- Yard number: 459
- Laid down: 18 June 1924
- Launched: 2 October 1924
- Identification: Code Letters LNSQ
- Fate: Sold 1931

Germany
- Name: MV Neptun
- Operator: Norddeutscher Lloyd Linie
- Port of registry: Bremen
- Route: New Guinea – Hong Kong
- Acquired: 1931
- Identification: Code Letters DNMI
- Fate: Sold 1935

Hong Kong
- Name: MV Neptuna
- Operator: Burns, Philp & Co
- Port of registry: Hong Kong
- Acquired: 1935
- Identification: Code Letters VPGV; United Kingdom Official Number 159410
- Fate: Sunk 1942, broken up partially 1960

General characteristics
- Type: Cargo ship
- Tonnage: 5,952 gross register tonnage
- Displacement: 1,410 long tons (1,433 t)
- Length: 119.8 m (393 ft)
- Beam: 15.84 m (52.0 ft)
- Draught: 7.7 m (25 ft)
- Installed power: 760 NHP
- Propulsion: 12 cylinder Krupp diesel engine, screw
- Complement: 124

MV Neptuna was a 5,952 ton cargo motor vessel. She was launched as MV Rio Panuco in 1924, renamed MV Neptun in 1931 and finally became MV Neptuna in 1935. She was sunk during the Japanese air raid on Darwin on 19 February 1942, during World War II.

== Career ==
Rio Panuco was built and launched in 1924 in Kiel by Friedrich Krupp Germaniawerft, Kiel for H. Schuldt's Flensburger Dampfer Co. She traded between Germany and Central America until 1931 when the company went bankrupt in the Great Depression.

She was sold to Norddeutscher Lloyd Line (NDL) of Bremen, who renamed her Neptun. By 1934 was running her on the service between New Guinea and Hong Kong in competition with Burns, Philp & Co. Burns, Philp asked the Australian Government to stop NDL from operating out of New Guinea but the government declined.

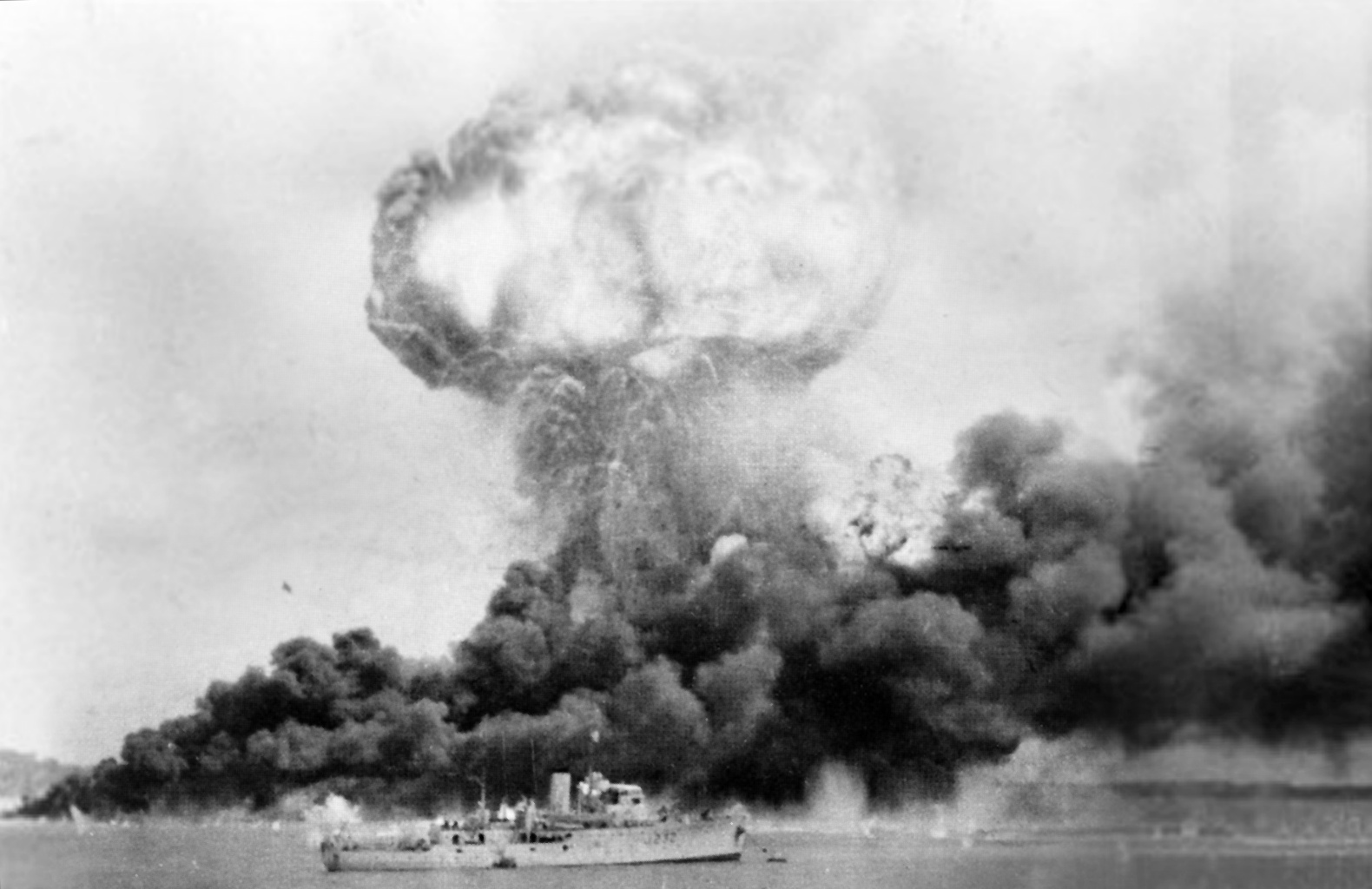
Neptuna explodes at Stokes Hill Wharf, Darwin, 1942

Instead the Australian government offered to pay the interest on any money Burns, Philp borrowed to buy her. This was agreed so in 1935 Burns, Philp bought her and renamed her Neptuna. Burns, Philp is an Australian company but it registered Neptuna in Hong Kong. She operated on the Australia, New Guinea, Philippines, Hong Kong, Saigon service. Saigon in French Indochina (now Ho Chi Minh City in Vietnam) was then the main source of supply of rice to New Guinea.

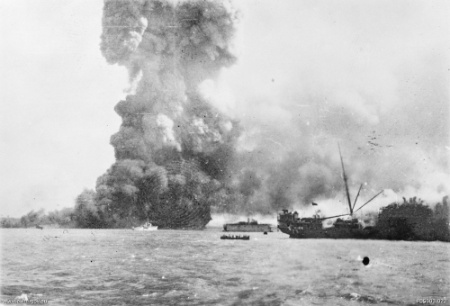
Neptuna explodes at Stokes Hill Wharf, Darwin

== Sinking ==
In February 1942 Neptuna was off Stokes Hill Wharf, Darwin, Australia unloading a cargo of depth charges, TNT, and other armaments. MV Neptuna was sunk on 19 February 1942 during the 9:58 bombing raid in which bombs exploded in Neptuna's saloon and engine room. Forty-five men died on board including 9 wharf labourers and 36 crew members. Many others were seriously injured and the ship was set on fire. As the crew prepared to abandon her, 100 depth charges exploded, showering the harbour with debris and sending flames and smoke 100 metres into the air.

Part of the wreck was salvaged by the Fujita salvage operation in 1960. The remainder still lies in Darwin Harbour at 12°28′18″S 130°50′57″E.
