= Amadeus Gas Pipeline =

Australian natural gas pipeline

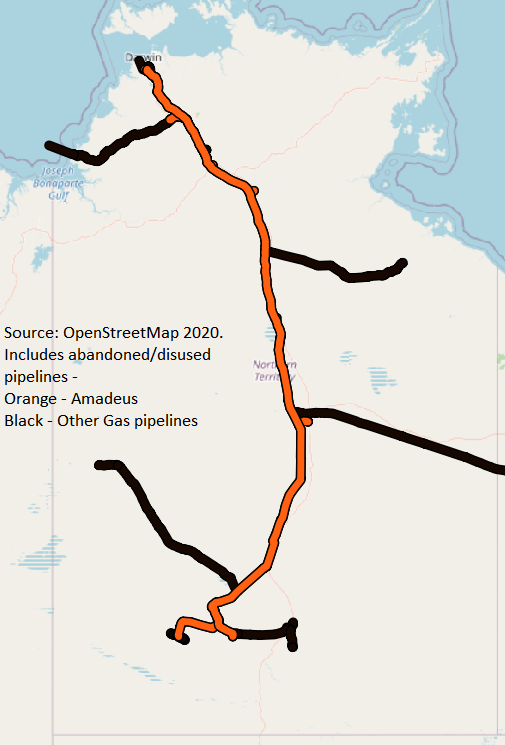
- The Amadeus Pipeline (orange) and other main gas pipelines in the Northern Territory

Location
- Country: Australia
- State: Northern Territory
- Direction: North–south
- Start: Amadeus Basin
- Passes through: Tennant Creek, Katherine
- To: Darwin

General information
- Type: natural gas
- Status: Operational
- Owner: APA Group
- Operator: APA Group
- Construction started: 1987

Technical information
- Length: 1,512 km (940 mi)
- No. of compressor stations: 1 (and 4 injection points)
- Website: www.apa.com.au/our-services/gas-transmission/central-region-pipelines/amadeus-gas-pipeline/

The Amadeus Gas Pipeline is a bi-directional natural gas pipeline running north–south through the Northern Territory of Australia. Its southern extent is the Amadeus Basin gas fields west of Alice Springs. The Amadeus pipeline is owned and operated by APA Group, and regulated by the Australian Energy Regulator.

The Amadeus Gas Pipeline was originally built to transport gas north from the Palm Valley and Mereenie gas fields in the Amadeus Basin to fuel electricity generation in Katherine and Darwin. Since 2008, it has also carried gas sourced from the Blacktip gas field in the Bonaparte Basin which is delivered 287 kilometres (178 mi) from Wadeye by the Bonaparte Gas Pipeline to the Amadeus pipeline at Ban Ban Springs near Burrundie.

The Northern Gas Pipeline was constructed in 2017–2018 and connects the Amadeus Pipeline near Tennant Creek to the gas pipe infrastructure in the eastern states of Australia.

The Amadeus Pipeline system has four inlet stations where gas is received into the pipeline. These are at Palm Valley Gas Field, Mereenie Oil Field, Ban Ban Springs (where gas is received from the Bonaparte Gas Pipeline) and Wickham (where gas is received from the Darwin LNG processing facility that receives raw gas by undersea pipeline from the Bayu-Undan field in the northern Bonaparte Basin). It also has an additional compressor station at Warrego and an odorant station at Tylers Pass. There are eleven mainline valves and scraper stations, and fourteen offtakes from the line. Total length including spurs and laterals is 1,629 kilometres (1,012 mi).

The fourteen offtake delivery points are:

- Alice Springs (local electricity generation)
- Tennant Creek (local electricity generation and some mining)
- Elliott (Elliott Power Station)
- Daly Waters (McArthur River zinc mine)
- Mataranka
- Katherine (Katherine Power Station)
- Mount Todd (supplied the now-closed Mount Todd Mine)
- Pine Creek (Pine Creek Power Station)
- Cosmo Howley mine (supplied a local mine, decommissioned 2008)
- Ban Ban Springs (used as a delivery point during commissioning of Bonaparte Gas Pipeline, now a receival point)
- Noonamah (industrial customer)
- Darwin City Gate (gas distribution to the city of Darwin)
- Wickham (Weddell Power Station)
- Channel Island (Channel Island Power Station)

Only the lateral lines at Katherine, Tennant Creek and Channel Island are considered part of the Amadeus Pipeline system.
