= Channel Island (disambiguation) =

The Channel Islands are a group of British islands in the English Channel.

Other uses of Channel Island or Channel Islands include:

- Channel Island, Northern Territory, an island and industrial suburb in Darwin (Australia)
  - Channel Island Power Station
  - Channel Island Conservation Reserve
- Channel Islands (California), an eight-island archipelago off the coast of southern California
  - Channel Islands National Park
  - Channel Islands National Marine Sanctuary
- Channel Island (New Zealand), an island north of the Coromandel Peninsula
- Chausey, a group of French islands in the English Channel
- Channelean, a term referring to Channel Islanders
  - Channelean English, a dialect of English language
