= PowerWater =

Power and Water Corporation
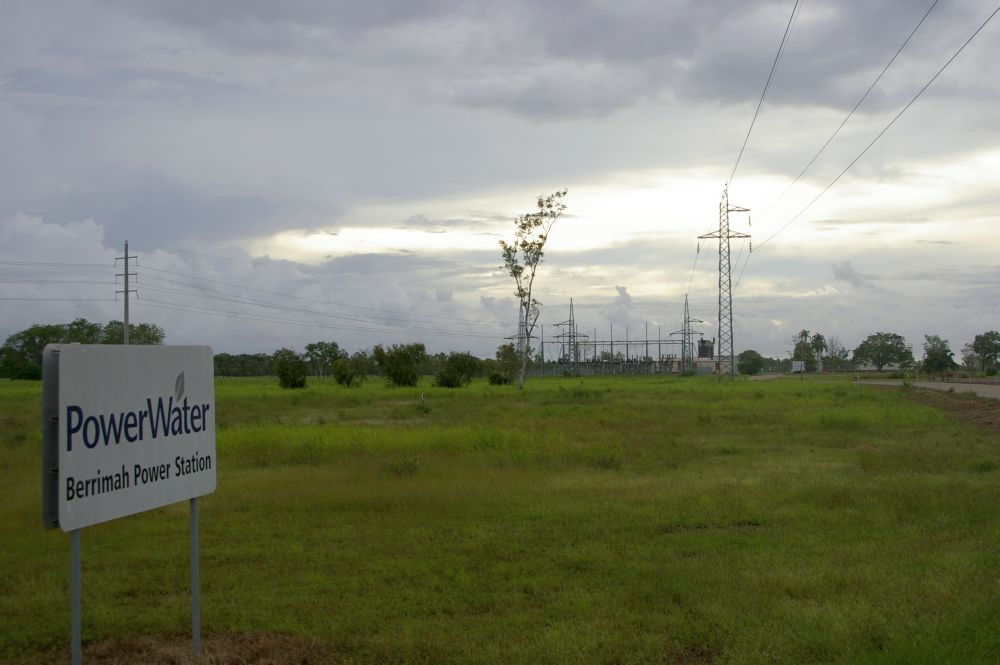
- Company type: Electricity and Water Supplier
- Headquarters: Darwin, Northern Territory, Australia
- Area served: Northern Territory
- Owner: Government of the Northern Territory
- Website: powerwater.com.au

Power and Water Corporation, trading as PowerWater, is a corporation in the Northern Territory of Australia owned by the Government of the Northern Territory. It is the Northern Territory's only provider of electricity, water and sewerage services.

== History ==
The Power and Water Corporation was formed on 1 July 2002, taking over from the former government utility, Power and Water Authority. Power and Water became the first government-owned corporation in the Northern Territory.

== Electricity ==
There are three power networks, or electricity grids, in the NT, with each network the Australian Energy Regulator managing investment and efficiency, while PowerWater manages the day-to-day-operations. These networks are:

- The northern network, covering the area from Darwin in the north, to south of Katherine, servicing around 150,000 people
- The Tennant Creek network services around 7,000 people in and around Tennant Creek
- The southern electrical grid services the Alice Springs area, servicing around 28,000 people

Power stations owned by PowerWater include the Channel Island Power Station, on Darwin Harbour's Middle Arm, which is the largest power station in the Northern Territory, and the Ron Goodin Power Station at Alice Springs, the second-largest power station.

The Katherine Power Station and the Berrimah Power Station are linked to the Channel Island Power Station. The Darwin–Katherine system links from the Channel Island Power Station to Berrimah and Katherine power stations.

Other power stations in the territory include the McArthur River Power Station, the Tennant Creek Power Station, the Brewer Estate Power Station, and the Yulara Power Station.

The Weddell Power Station was constructed in 2008–2014. The first two generators came on line in 2008–2009. The third generator was due to be completed in 2011–2012 but did not get commissioned until 2014. The power station added 30% capacity to Darwin's power supply.

== Water ==
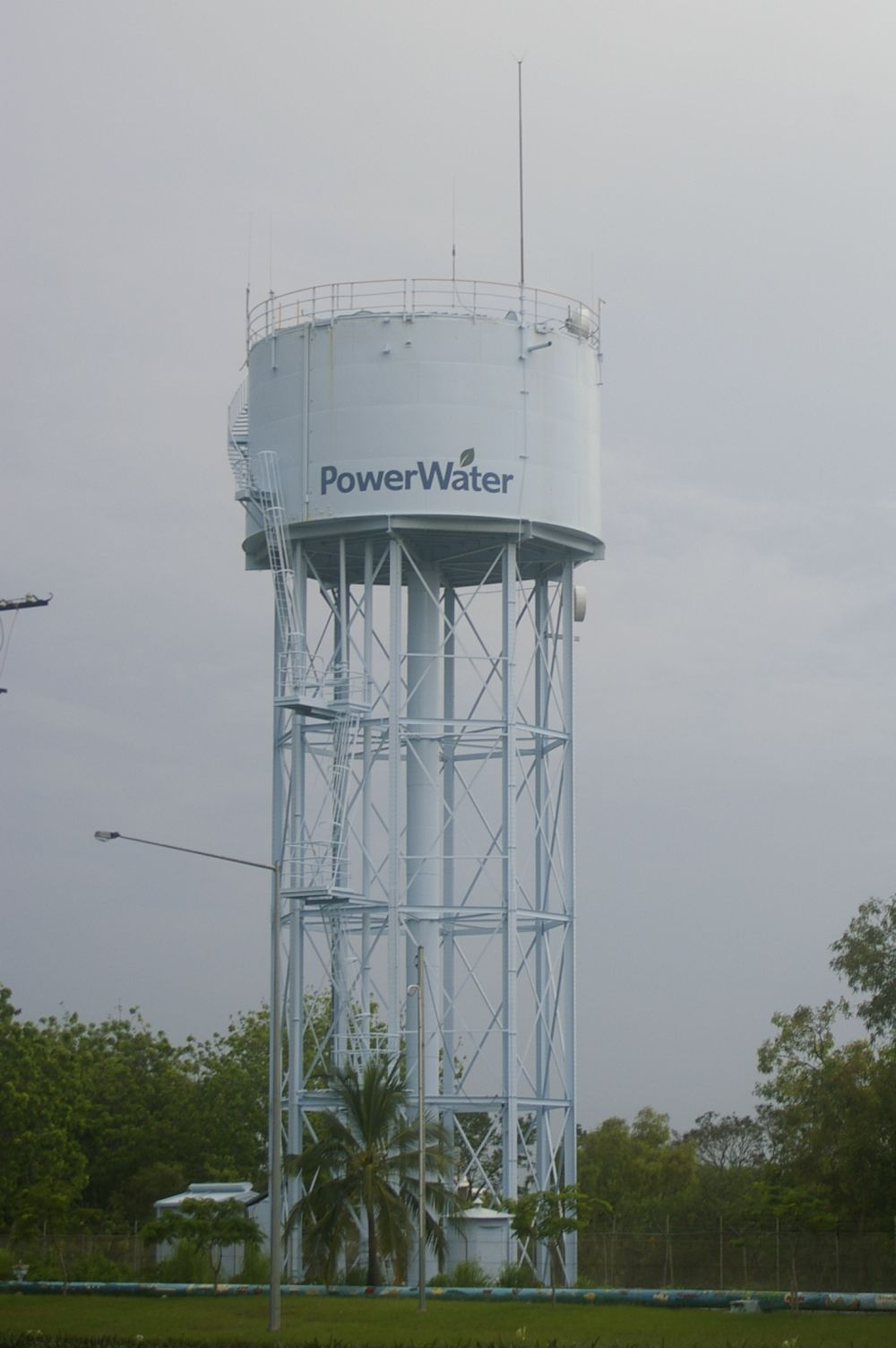
Stuart Park Water Tower

PowerWater is also responsible for management of sewerage and the major water catchments in the region. Water is mainly stored in the largest dam, The Darwin River Dam which holds up to 90% of Darwin's water supply. For many years, Darwin's principal water supply came from Manton Dam.

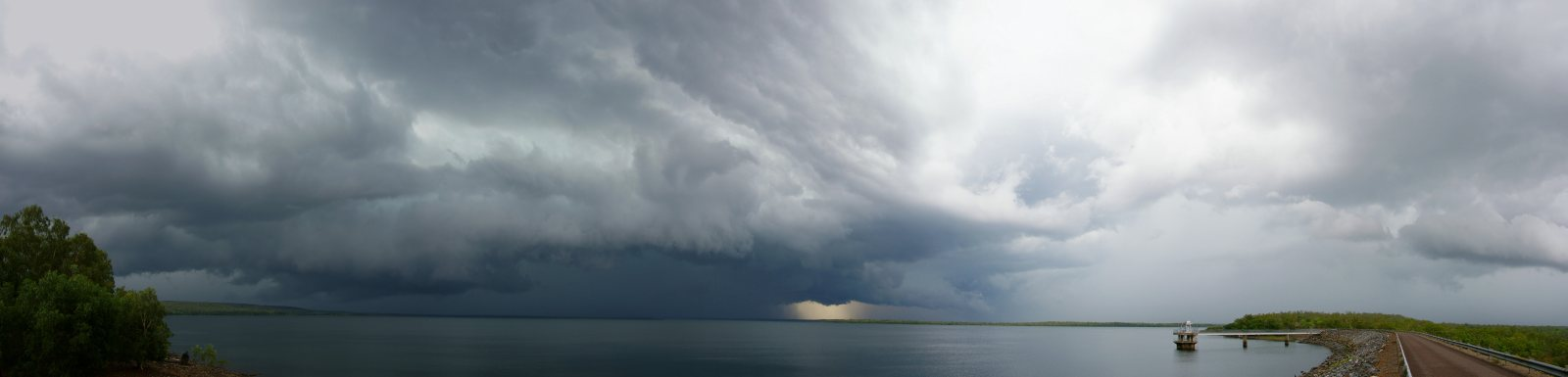
Darwin River Dam
