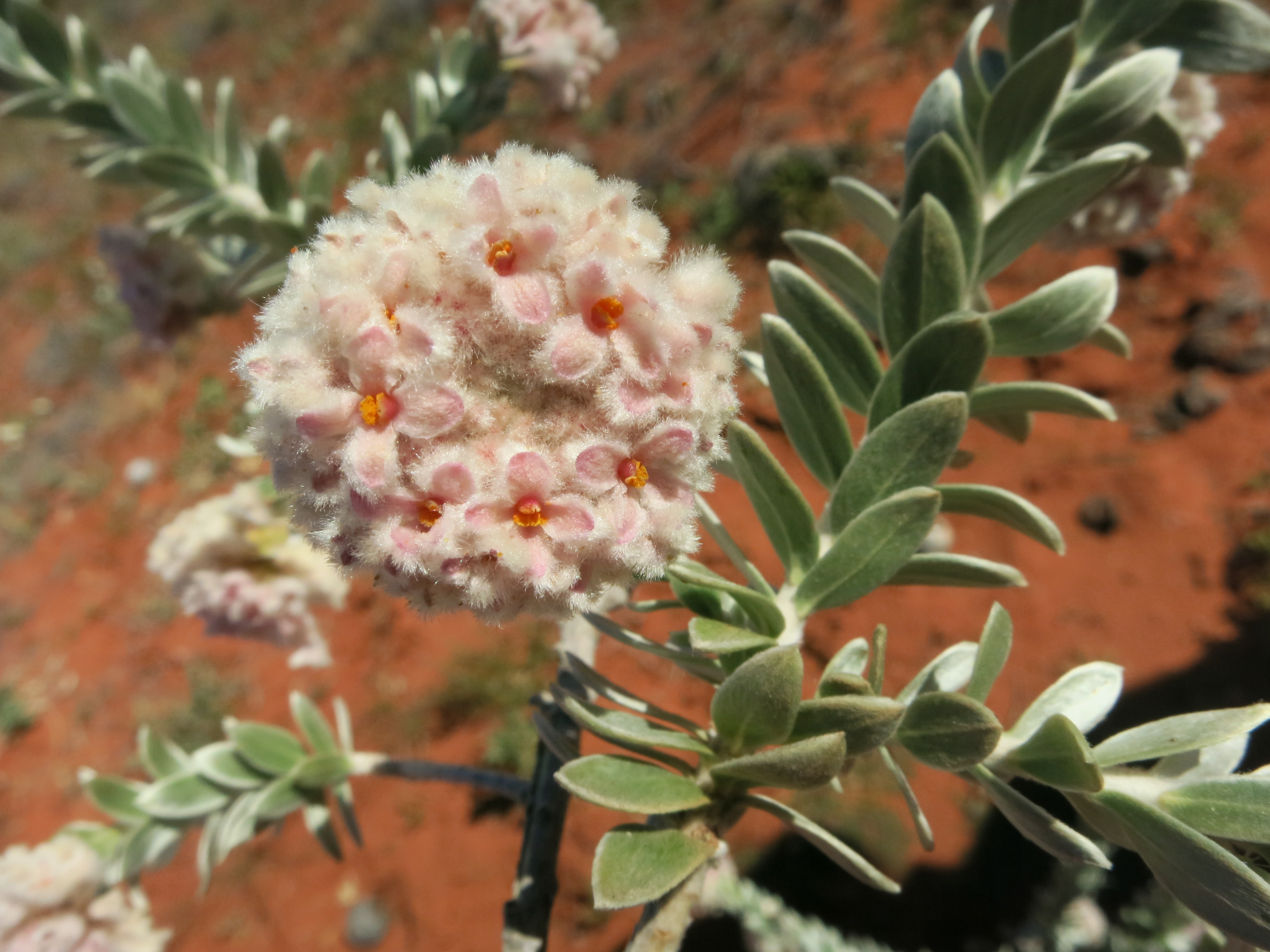

Scientific classification
- Kingdom: Plantae
- Clade: Tracheophytes
- Clade: Angiosperms
- Clade: Eudicots
- Clade: Rosids
- Order: Malvales
- Family: Thymelaeaceae
- Genus: Pimelea
- Species: P. interioris

Binomial name
- Pimelea interioris Rye

= Pimelea interioris =

Species of flowering plant

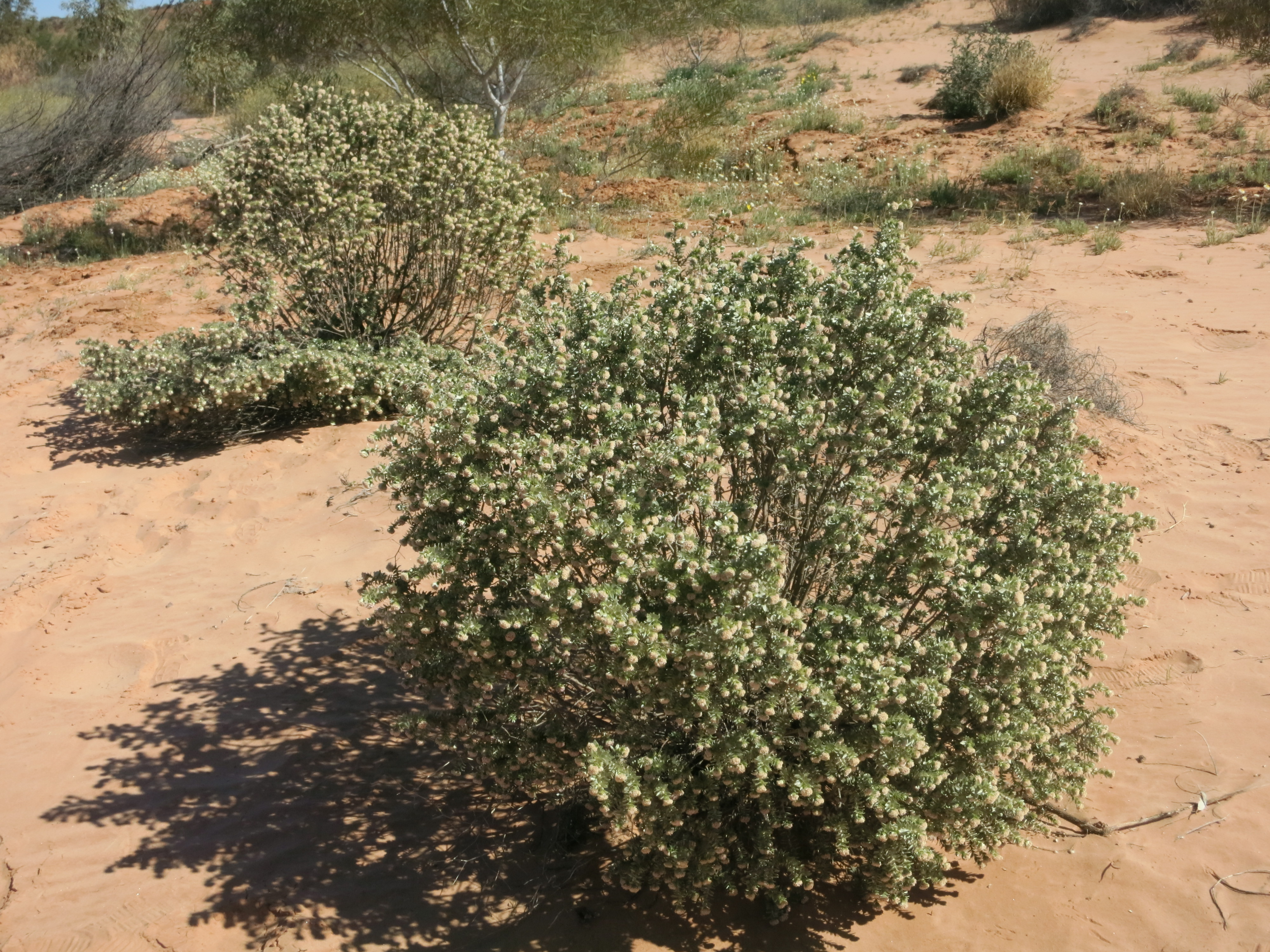
Habit

Pimelea interioris is a species of flowering plant in the family Thymelaeaceae and is endemic to a restricted part of the south of the Northern Territory of Australia. It is a shrub with hairy, narrowly elliptic leaves and clusters of creamy-white to pale yellow, separate male and female flowers.

== Description ==
Pimelea interioris is a shrub that typically grows to a height of 0.7–3 m (2 ft 4 in – 9 ft 10 in) and has hairy stems. Its leaves are usually arranged alternately, narrowly elliptic, 15–29 mm (0.59–1.14 in) long, 2.5–5 mm (0.098–0.197 in) wide and hairy, especially on the lower surface. The flowers are arranged in small clusters of mostly separate male and female, creamy-white to pale yellow flowers that are densely hairy on the outside. The flower tube is 4–5 mm (0.16–0.20 in) long, the sepals 1.0–1.5 mm (0.039–0.059 in) long, and the stamens are attached inside the flower tube. Flowering occurs between July and November.

== Taxonomy ==
Pimelea interioris was first formally described in 1990 by Barbara Lynette Rye in the Flora of Australia from specimens collected by George Chippendale in Palm Valley in 1956. The specific epithet (interioris) means "interior" and refers to the occurrence of the species in central Australia.

== Distribution and habitat ==
This pimelea grows in rocky gullies and in sheltered sites in gorges, and is only known from Palm Valley in the Finke Gorge National Park.

== Conservation status ==
Pimelea interioris is listed as "near threatened" under the Territory Parks and Wildlife Conservation Act.
