= Berrimah =

Berrimah may refer to:

- Berrimah, Northern Territory, suburb
- Electoral division of Berrimah
- Berrimah Power Station
- Berrimah Prison

== See also ==
- Berrima (disambiguation)
