= Blackmore River Conservation Reserve =

- IUCN category V (protected landscape/seascape)
- Location within Northern Territory
- Location: Northern Territory
- Nearest city: Darwin
- Coordinates: 12°43′50″S 130°56′16″E
- Area: 547 ha (1,350 acres)
- Established: 1984
- Governing body: Parks and Wildlife Commission of the Northern Territory

Blackmore River Conservation Reserve is a protected area in the Northern Territory of Australia.

It is located approximately 25 kilometres (16 mi) south of Darwin and lies along a 6.5 kilometres (4 mi) stretch of the Blackmore River from which it takes its name.

The threatened plant species, Cycas armstrongii is found within the reserve. Other species found in the area include Grevillea longicuspis and the orchid Dendrobium dicuphum.

== See also ==
Protected areas of the Northern Territory
