= Territory Generation =

- Company type: government owned corporation
- Industry: Electricity generation
- Predecessor: PowerWater
- Founded: July 1, 2014; 10 years ago in Darwin, Northern Territory, Australia
- Headquarters: Darwin, Australia
- Area served: Northern Territory
- Owner: Government of the Northern Territory
- Website: territorygeneration.com.au

Territory Generation is a government owned corporation of the Northern Territory, Australia, established on 1 July 2014. It had previously been an operational business unit of PowerWater. Territory Generation owns and operates eight power stations in the Northern Territory.

Territory Generation traces its history back to the first power stations in the Northern Territory which were built in 1934 in Darwin and 1937 in Alice Springs.

== Power stations ==
The Northern Territory does not have a single interconnected electricity transmission network. Territory Generation owns and operates eight power stations on five separate networks. Three of these are regulated by the Australian Energy Regulator and are managed by PowerWater.

=== Darwin–Katherine ===
Darwin and Katherine are on the largest regulated grid.

- Katherine Power Station
- Channel Island Power Station
- Weddell Power Station

=== Alice Springs ===
The Alice Springs grid is the second-largest regulated grid.

- Ron Goodin Power Station
- Owen Springs Power Station

=== Tennant Creek ===
The smallest regulated grid services the area around Tennant Creek.

- Tennant Creek Power Station

=== Kings Canyon ===
Kings Canyon Power Station is the only commercial source of electricity in the area of Kings Canyon. It provides up to 1.1MW from a combination of solar and diesel generation.

=== Yulara ===
Yulara Power Station services the town and locality of Yulara, Northern Territory. It produces 11MW from natural gas and diesel backup.
