= Darwin River Dam =

Dam in the Northern Territory, Australia

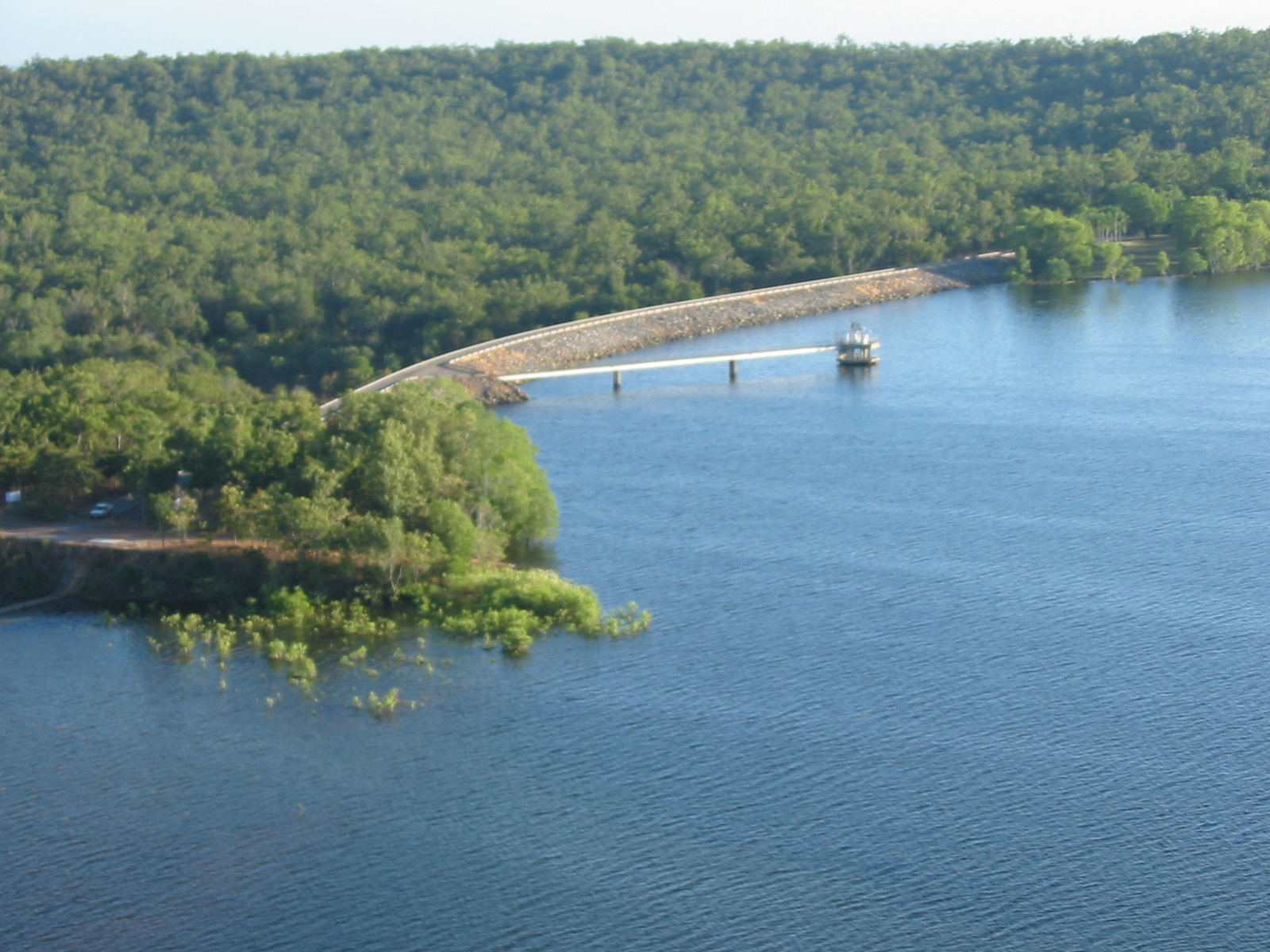
- The dam wall and pump, in April 2004

- Location of the dam in the Northern Territory
- Interactive map of Darwin River Dam
- Country: Australia
- Location: Darwin River, Northern Territory
- Coordinates: 12°49′47″S 130°58′19″E
- Purpose: Water supply
- Status: Operational
- Opening date: 29 June 1972
- Construction cost: A$9 million
- Built by: Macmahon Constructions
- Operator: PowerWater

Dam and spillways
- Type of dam: Embankment dam
- Impounds: Darwin River
- Height (foundation): 27 m (89 ft)
- Length: 560 m (1,840 ft)
- Dam volume: 285×10^{3} m^{3} (10.1×10^{6} cu ft)
- Spillway type: Uncontrolled
- Spillway capacity: 2,080 m^{3}/s (73,000 cu ft/s)

Reservoir
- Total capacity: 265,500 ML (215,200 acre⋅ft)
- Catchment area: 205 km^{2} (79 sq mi)
- Surface area: 4,000 ha (9,900 acres)
- Normal elevation: 42 m (138 ft) AHD

The Darwin River Dam is an earth- and rock-filled embankment dam across the Darwin River, located in the eponymous settlement, in the Northern Territory of Australia. Completed in 1972, the dam was built to supply potable water for the city of Darwin.

== Overview ==
The earth and rock-filled dam wall is 27 metres (89 ft) high and 560 metres (1,840 ft) long. At full capacity, the resultant reservoir can hold 265,500 megalitres (215,200 acre⋅ft), covering a surface area of 4,000 hectares (9,900 acres) that is drawn from a catchment area of 205 square kilometres (79 sq mi). The reservoir is eleven times bigger than the Manton Dam.

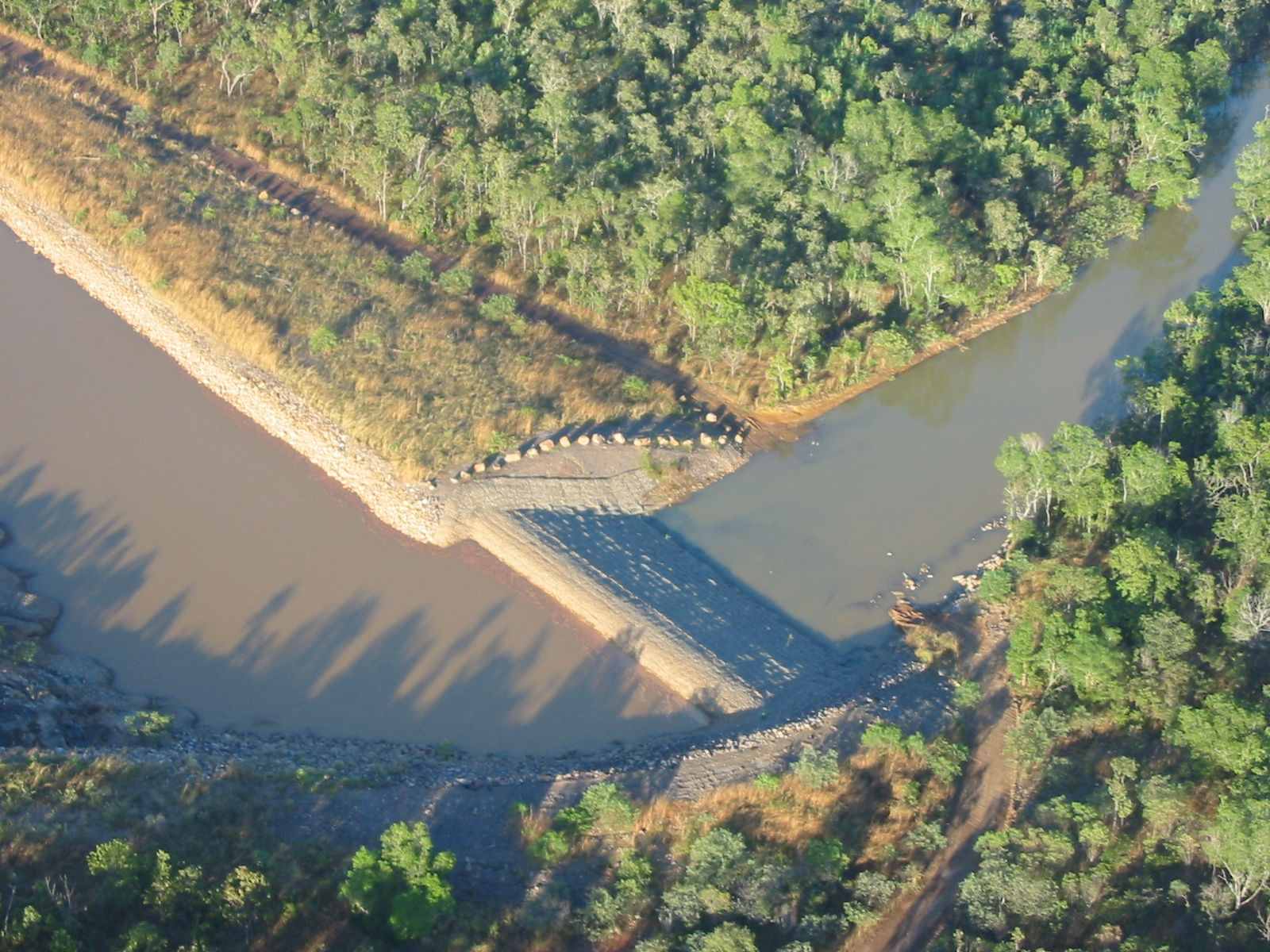
Spillway

The dam relies on the annual wet season to be replenished. It is ungated with no spillway regulation, and toward the end of the wet season the dam can overflow. Most years spilling occurs and is considered normal. Depending on the amount of rainfall, this overflow can last from days to weeks.

The dam was officially opened by Prime Minister William McMahon on 29 June 1972, and the construction cost was A$9 million.

The water in the Darwin River Dam reservoir is considered to be one of the most pristine on Earth. In order to preserve this quality, the catchment and reservoir policy prohibits recreational use with substantial penalties imposed for trespassing. The reservoir is free of Cabomba, an aquatic weed genus that can affect water quality.

== See also ==
- Irrigation in Australia
- List of dams and reservoirs in Australia
