= Middle Arm, Northern Territory =

Coordinates: 12°34′00″S 130°57′00″E

Middle Arm is a coastal peninsula of Darwin Harbour in the Northern Territory of Australia located about 13 kilometres south of Darwin City. It is the traditional land and waterways of the Larrakia people. Middle Arm includes Wickham Point, Bladin Point, Channel Island and the nearby locality of Wickham.

== History ==
Middle Arm has been a significant cultural and fishing site for Larrakia people for thousands of years, evidenced by shell middens and rock art still remaining in the area.

Its colonial name Middle Arm first appeared on George Goyder's 1869 plan of the harbour.

It was the site of the Channel Island Leprosarium, now a heritage listed place. During World War II, Middle Arm was the location of a secret training base for Timorese and Australian personnel. It was also the location of the former Wickham Point Immigration Detention Centre which closed in 2019.

== Environment ==
Middle Arm is the largest sub-estuary of Darwin Harbour's southern region and features intertwining channels, reefs, large mudflats, sand banks and mangroves. Blackmore River, also known as Haycock Reach, is the major freshwater catchment within Middle Arm. Studies have identified Middle Arm as key foraging and nursery habitats for many species of fish.

== Development ==
While the area is largely undeveloped, it is the location of two natural gas processing plants, INPEX’s LNG plant at Bladin Point and a Santos LNG plant at Wickham Point, as well as the Weddell Power Station.

Middle Arm is also the site of a proposed 1,500-hectare industrial development called the 'Middle Arm Sustainable Development Precinct' that was first proposed in 2007 by the Henderson government. It is now stated to include renewable energy, hydrogen, carbon capture, advanced manufacturing and minerals processing at an estimated cost of over $3.5 billion, double what was initially proposed in 2022 election. The federal government has committed to $1.5 billion towards the project.

The sustainability of the project has been called into question after it was linked to the expansion of gas production in the Northern Territory through major projects in the Beetaloo basin and Barossa offshore gas field and pipeline, triggering protests. Modelling has indicated that the project may have significant health and climate impacts. It may increase particulate emissions by 513%, triggering $75 million in additional health costs, and be responsible for an increase of carbon emissions in the Northern Territory by as much as 75% despite Northern Territory Government commitments to transition the region to net zero by 2050. Traditional Owners have also expressed concerns over impacts to nearby cultural sites including one of the only remaining rock art sites in the area.

A joint strategic environmental assessment of the project by the Australian Government and the Northern Territory Government is underway.

A senate inquiry into the project began in Darwin in April 2024. Chief Minister Eva Lawler revealed that the site could include petrochemical processing, as well gas production, carbon capture and storage, minerals processing and hydrogen production, triggering additional health, environment and climate change concerns. It also emerged that Charles Darwin University asked the inquiry not to publish submissions by three staff in opposition to the university’s position supporting the development oat Middle Arm. Final reporting from the inquiry is expected in August.
