= Wickham, Northern Territory =

Wickham Northern Territory
- Coordinates: 12°32′56″S 130°54′38″E
- Population: 268 (2016 census)
- Established: 21 April 2004
- Postcode(s): 0822
- Time zone: ACST (UTC+9:30)
- Location: 13 km (8 mi) SE of Darwin
- LGA(s): Litchfield Municipality
- Territory electorate(s): Daly
- Federal division(s): Lingiari
Mean max temp	Mean min temp	Annual rainfall
32.1 °C; 90 °F	23.2 °C; 74 °F	1,725.1 mm 67.9 in
Suburbs around Wickham:
Darwin Harbour	Darwin Harbour; East Arm; Elrundie; Archer	Mitchell
Darwin Harbour; Channel Island; Cox Peninsula	Wickham	Weddell
Cox Peninsula	Blackmore; Weddell	Weddell
- Footnotes: Locations; Adjoining localities

Wickham is a locality in the Northern Territory of Australia located about 13 kilometres (8.1 mi) south-east of the territory capital of Darwin City and which overlooks Darwin Harbour.

Wickham is located on land and adjoining waters, East Arm to the north and Middle Arm to the south-west. The locality was named after Wickham Point, which itself is named after John Clements Wickham, the British naval officer who named Darwin Harbour. Its boundaries and name were gazetted on 21 April 2004.

Wickham includes the Darwin Liquefied Natural Gas Plant and the Weddell Power Station as well as the sites of the former Channel Island Leprosarium, a heritage listed place, and the former Wickham Point Immigration Detention Centre. Children of Aboriginal people at the leprosarium were taken to the Garden Point Mission from the 1930s to the 1960s.

The 2016 Australian census which was conducted in August 2016 reports that Wickham had 268 people living within its boundaries.

Wickham is located within the federal division of Lingiari, the territory electoral division of Daly and the local government area of the Litchfield Municipality.
