= Blackmore River =

Blackmore
- Location of the Blackmore River mouth in the Northern Territory

Location
- Country: Australia
- Territory: Northern Territory

Physical characteristics
- Source
  - location: Wild Horse Plain, Australia
  - elevation: 21 m (69 ft)
- Mouth
  - location: Darwin Harbour, Australia
  - coordinates: 12°38′27″S 130°57′03″E
  - elevation: 0 m (0 ft)
- Length: 25 km (16 mi)
- Basin size: 848 km^{2} (327 sq mi)

Blackmore River flows into Darwin Harbour close to Darwin in the Northern Territory of Australia.

== Course ==
The headwaters of the river rise at an elevation of 21 metres (69 ft) on the Wild Horse Plain and flow northwards past Tumbling Waters and through the Blackmore River Conservation Reserve. The river discharges into Darwin Harbour at Middle Arm.

The Elizabeth River and Blackmore River catchments together occupy an area of 1,150 square kilometres (444 sq mi), with the Blackmore catchment occupying 848 square kilometres (327 sq mi).

The estuary formed at the river mouth is tidal in nature and in near pristine condition.

== Climate ==
The climate of the Blackmore River region is monsoon tropical with two distinct seasons: the Dry and the Wet. The Dry lasts for 6 months between April and September with an average rainfall of 24 mm, whereas the Wet lasts between October and March with an average monthly rainfall of 254 mm/month (according to the Bureau of Meteorology, 1999). The majority of the rain falls between December and April. Runoff varies between 250–1000 mm.

Peak flow for the Blackmore River occurs in February with 605Ml/day, after which it slowly decreases until July when there is no freshwater input into Darwin Harbour until the onset of the following wet season (Padovan 1997). Cyclone frequency is low to moderate.

== Water quality ==
The water quality at the upper estuary and freshwater monitoring sites of the Department of Land Resource Management of the Northern Territory Government was 2011 in moderate condition.

== Geology ==
The underlying lithology is dominated by Permian siltstones and sandstones.

== See also ==
- List of rivers of Australia § Northern Territory
