= Berrima =

Berrima may refer to:

- Berrima, New South Wales, a village in the Southern Highlands district on the old Hume Highway between Canberra and Sydney, Australia.
- Berrima Gaol, a former prison located in Berrima, New South Wales, Australia.
- Berrima Parish, a parish of the County of Camden in the Southern Highlands region of New South Wales, Australia.
- Berrima railway line, partly closed private railway line in New South Wales, Australia
- HMAS Berrima

== See also ==
- Berrimah (disambiguation)
- New Berrima, New South Wales
