= Owen Springs Power Station =

- Country: Australia
- Location: Brewer Road, Hugh
- Coordinates: 23°51′47″S 133°49′34″E
- Status: Operational
- Commission date: 2011
- Owner: Territory Generation
- Operator: Territory Generation

Thermal power station
- Primary fuel: Natural gas
- Secondary fuel: Diesel

Power generation
- Nameplate capacity: 77

Owen Springs Power Station is a power station located in the southern part of the Northern Territory of Australia in the locality of Hugh about 26 kilometres (16 mi) south of Alice Springs.

It was commissioned in 2011 and is now owned and operated by Territory Generation. The power station's name reflects its siting on land which was once part of the Owen Springs pastoral lease.

In 2016, the power station's capacity was expanded at the cost of A$75 million with the objective of closing the existing Ron Goodin Power Station and achieving the following outcomes attributed to Adam Giles, the Chief Minister of the Northern Territory - "more reliable supply of electricity, reduce business tariffs by 15-20 per cent, create a permanent flood access road for Mount Johns and Desert Springs, and free land for housing development."
