= Manton Dam =

Dam in the Northern Territory, Australia

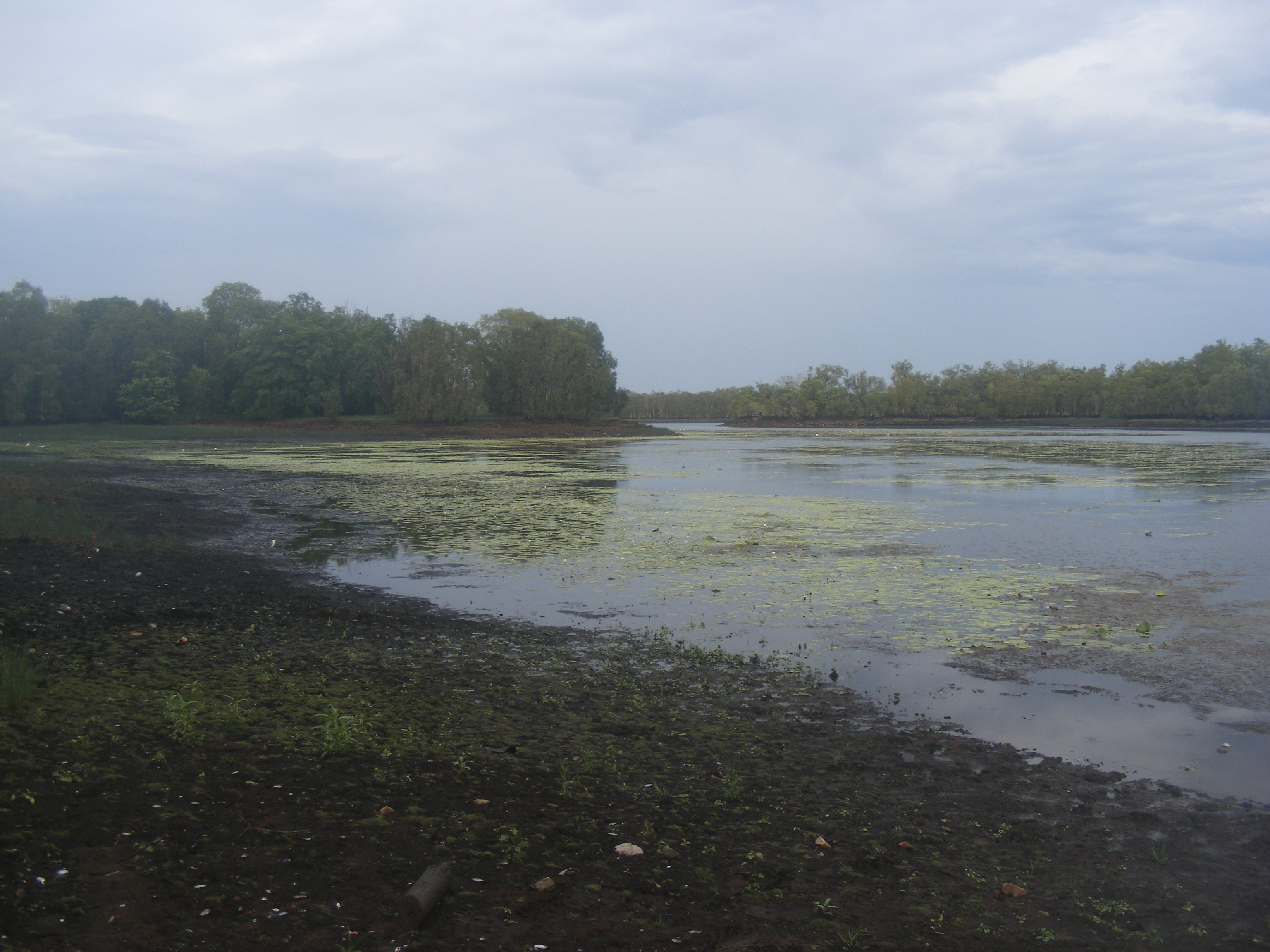
- The dam reservoir in 2008

- Location of the former dam in the Northern Territory
- Interactive map of Manton Dam
- Country: Australia
- Location: Coomalie Shire, Northern Territory
- Coordinates: 12°50′25″S 131°07′38″E
- Purpose: Water supply
- Status: Decommissioned
- Opening date: 1942
- Operator: PowerWater

Dam and spillways
- Type of dam: Arch dam
- Impounds: Manton River
- Height: 24 m (79 ft)
- Length: 124 m (407 ft)
- Dam volume: 5×10^{3} m^{3} (180×10^{3} cu ft)
- Spillway type: Uncontrolled
- Spillway capacity: 400 m^{3}/s (14,000 cu ft/s)

Reservoir
- Total capacity: 15.9 GL (12,900 acre⋅ft)
- Active capacity: 13.3 GL (10,800 acre⋅ft)
- Catchment area: 83.9 km^{2} (32.4 sq mi)
- Surface area: 545.5 ha (1,348 acres)
- Normal elevation: 40 m (130 ft) AHD

Power Station
- Operator: PowerWater
- Commission date: 12 February 2014
- Type: Conventional
- Turbines: 1
- Installed capacity: 4kW

The Manton Dam is a decommissioned small concrete arch dam across the Manton River, located approximately 70 km (43 mi) south of Darwin, in the Northern Territory of Australia. The dam was originally constructed by the Department of Defence during World War II to provide a reliable supply of potable water to Darwin, completed in 1942.

Decommissioned following the construction of the much larger Darwin River Dam in 1972, the resultant reservoir of the Manton Dam is now mostly used for recreation, such as fishing, boating and water skiing, surrounded by a conservation area for native flora and fauna.

== Overview ==
The dam wall is 24 metres (79 ft) high and 124 metres (407 ft) long. At full capacity, the resultant reservoir can hold 15.9 gigalitres (12,900 acre⋅ft) and convert a surface area of 545.5 hectares (1,348 acres), draw from a catchment area of 83.9 hectares (207 acres). The uncontrolled spillway had a capacity of 400 cubic metres per second (14,000 cu ft/s).

The much larger Darwin River Dam was commissioned in 1972, with Manton Dam retained for emergency supply. Since then, PowerWater has maintained the dam and infrastructure in an inactive state.

=== Current status ===
Since 1989, the Manton Dam Recreation Area has been open to the public within the portfolio of Parks & Wildlife Commission. Although camping and swimming are not permitted, it is a popular venue for recreational water sports. The reservoir is divided into three distinct zones, allowing separation between high speed watercraft like jet skis, an area for towing skiers and an area for kayaks, canoes, and sailing. The lake is also stocked with various fish species, with fishing permitted in all zones. The environment around the dam is an excellent habitat for crocodiles, which Parks and Wildlife regularly patrol and survey to trap and remove many of these animals, especially during the wet season.

In February 2014, an experimental hydroelectric generator was installed by PowerWater in partnership with Charles Darwin University's Centre for Renewable Energy. With an output of approximately 4kW, the small generator is connected to the mains power grid to take advantage of seasonal releases and spillages during the wet season, and is the first of its kind in the Northern Territory.

== Future re-use ==
PowerWater's 2013 Darwin Region Water Supply Strategy outlines plans to reactivate Manton Dam to supply water in order to mitigate shortages before 2025, extracting up to 7.4 gigalitres (6,000 acre⋅ft) per year to meet growing demand. In 2019, it was estimated that associated works would cost $122 million. A 2018 report prepared by the CSIRO included a detailed investigation of potential dam sites to meet the future needs of the region. This report found that while Manton Dam could provide a short-term solution until a much larger storage was created, there were some concerns over water quality.

== See also ==
- List of dams and reservoirs in Australia
- List of power stations in Australia
