= Northern Gas Pipeline =

Location
- Country: Australia
- State: Northern Territory, Queensland
- Direction: West-east
- Start: Tennant Creek
- To: Mount Isa

General information
- Type: natural gas
- Owner: Jemena
- Operator: Jemena
- Technical service provider: GPA Engineering
- Contractors: McConnell Dowell
- Commissioned: 2018

Technical information
- Length: 622 km (386 mi)

The Northern Gas Pipeline is a gas transmission pipeline in Australia. It runs 622 kilometres (386 mi) from Tennant Creek in the Northern Territory to Mount Isa in Queensland. It took 18 months to construct, and was completed in December 2018.

The Northern Territory already had production facilities offshore, feeding into processing facilities near Darwin, and the bi-directional Amadeus Gas Pipeline running north–south through the Territory connecting to the Amadeus Basin southwest of Alice Springs.

== North East Gas Interconnector ==
The Northern Gas Pipeline addresses a requirement known as the North East Gas Interconnector (NEGI) before it was built. The purpose of the NEGI is to provide a way to transport gas from Northern Territory production to eastern Australian consumers. Options for the NEGI included the Tennant Creek to Mount Isa route that has been built and an alternate course that would have connected from Alice Springs to Moomba in South Australia. There were four proponents invited to bid for the project, with two preferring each route. The successful tender was from Jemena to build and operate the pipeline, to link Tennant Creek to Mount Isa.
