= Palm Valley (Northern Territory) =

Valley in Australia

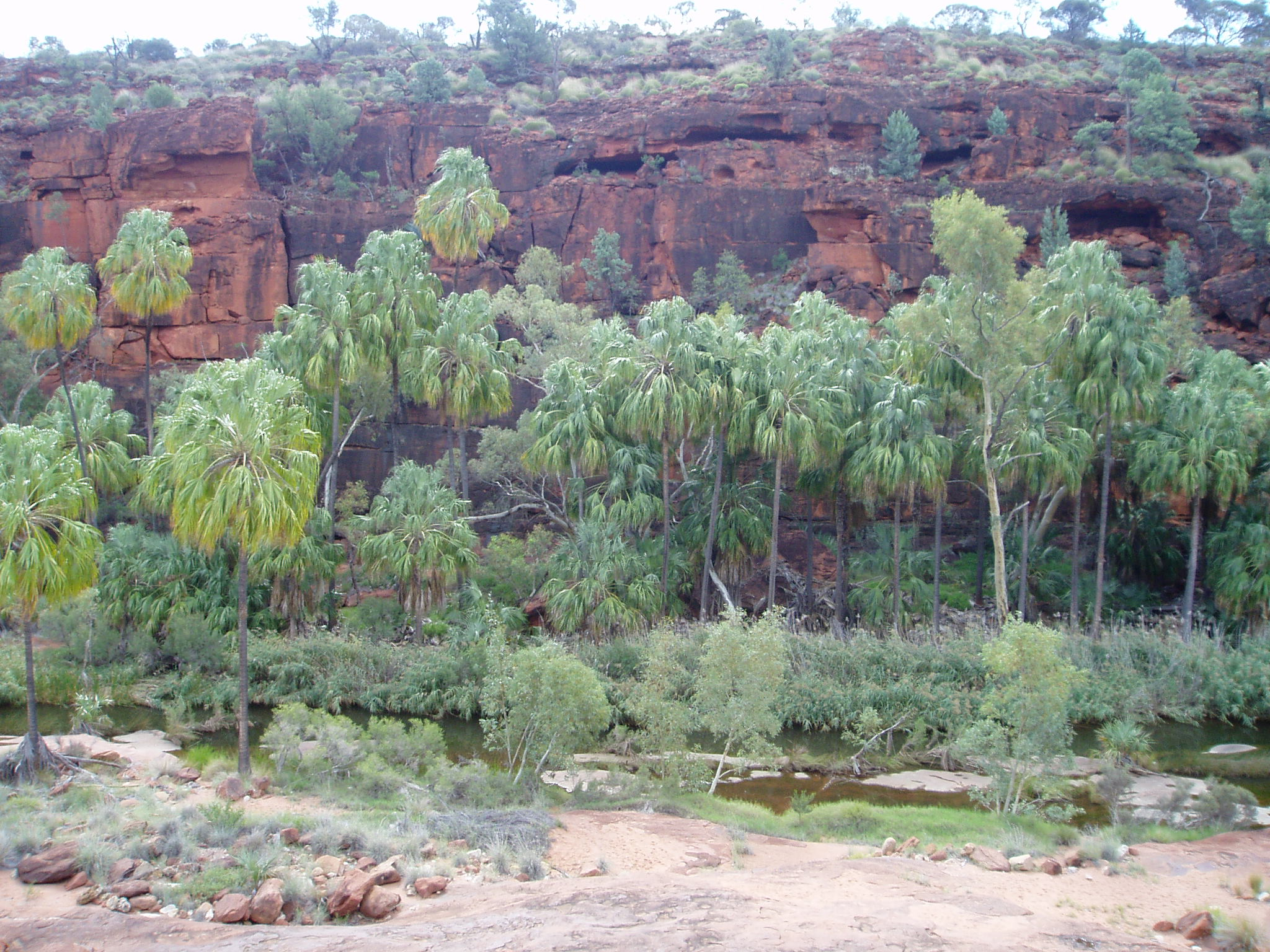
- Palm Valley in Finke Gorge National Park.

- Location within Northern Territory

Geography
- Population centers: Namatjira, Northern Territory
- Coordinates: 24°04′00″S 132°49′00″E
- Interactive map of Palm Valley

Palm Valley (Western Arrarnta: Mpulungkinya, mool-ung-kin-yah), within the Finke Gorge National Park, is an east-west running valley in the Krichauff Range 123 km (138 km by road) southwest of Alice Springs in the Northern Territory, Australia. Palm Valley and the surrounding area is the only place in Central Australia where Red Cabbage Palms (Livistona mariae) survive. The nearest related species is 850 km away in Katherine NT. The surrounding region is largely dry Central Ranges xeric scrub.

The average rainfall for Palm Valley is only 200 mm per year. Although the gorge usually appears dry, there are some small pockets of semi-permanent spring-fed pools that allow the unique flora in this region to survive. During significant rainfall in the region, expanses of water can be witnessed flowing through the valley gorge. During such events, a variety of aquatic life such as desert fish, shield shrimps (Triops australiensis), tadpoles and frogs can flourish.

== Origins of the palms ==
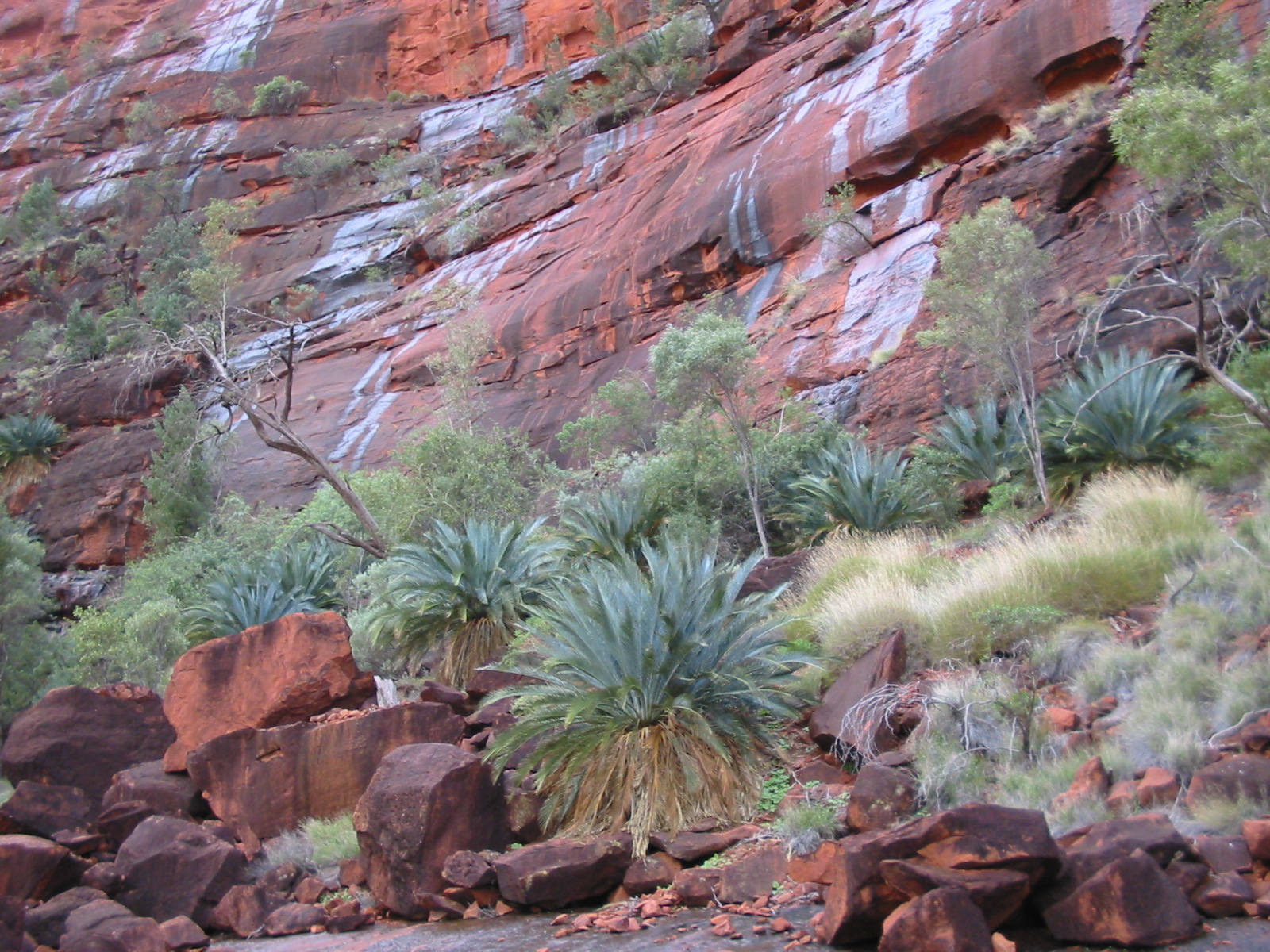
Cycads (Macrozamia macdonnellii), Palm Valley, NT

It had been assumed that the cabbage palms were remnants of a prehistoric time when the climate supported tropical rainforest in what is now the arid inland of Australia. Genetic analysis published in 2012 determined that Livistona mariae at Palm Valley is actually the same species as Livistona rigida from samples collected near Katherine and Mount Isa, both around 1000 km away. The research by Professor David Bowman and colleagues at the University of Tasmania concluded that the populations separated only about 15,000 years ago. Aboriginal legend recorded in 1894 by Carl Strehlow describes "gods from the north" bringing the seeds to Palm Valley.

== Getting there ==
In early 1928, Herbert Joseph Larkin led an exploratory aerial expedition exploring the possibility of developing the Palm Valley into a resort. However, the exploration led to naught.

The track to Palm Valley is still only accessible with a four-wheel drive vehicle. It departs from the town of Hermannsburg and travels south, following the usually dry bed of the Finke River. Palm Creek flows into the Finke River from the west about 15 km (by track) south of Hermannsburg. The track follows the creek to Palm Valley about 5 km west of the Finke River.

== Gas field ==
The Palm Valley gas field is an onshore source of natural gas north of the valley itself. The gas field is part of the Amadeus Basin and supplies gas to Alice Springs and beyond via the Amadeus Gas Pipeline.

== Gallery ==
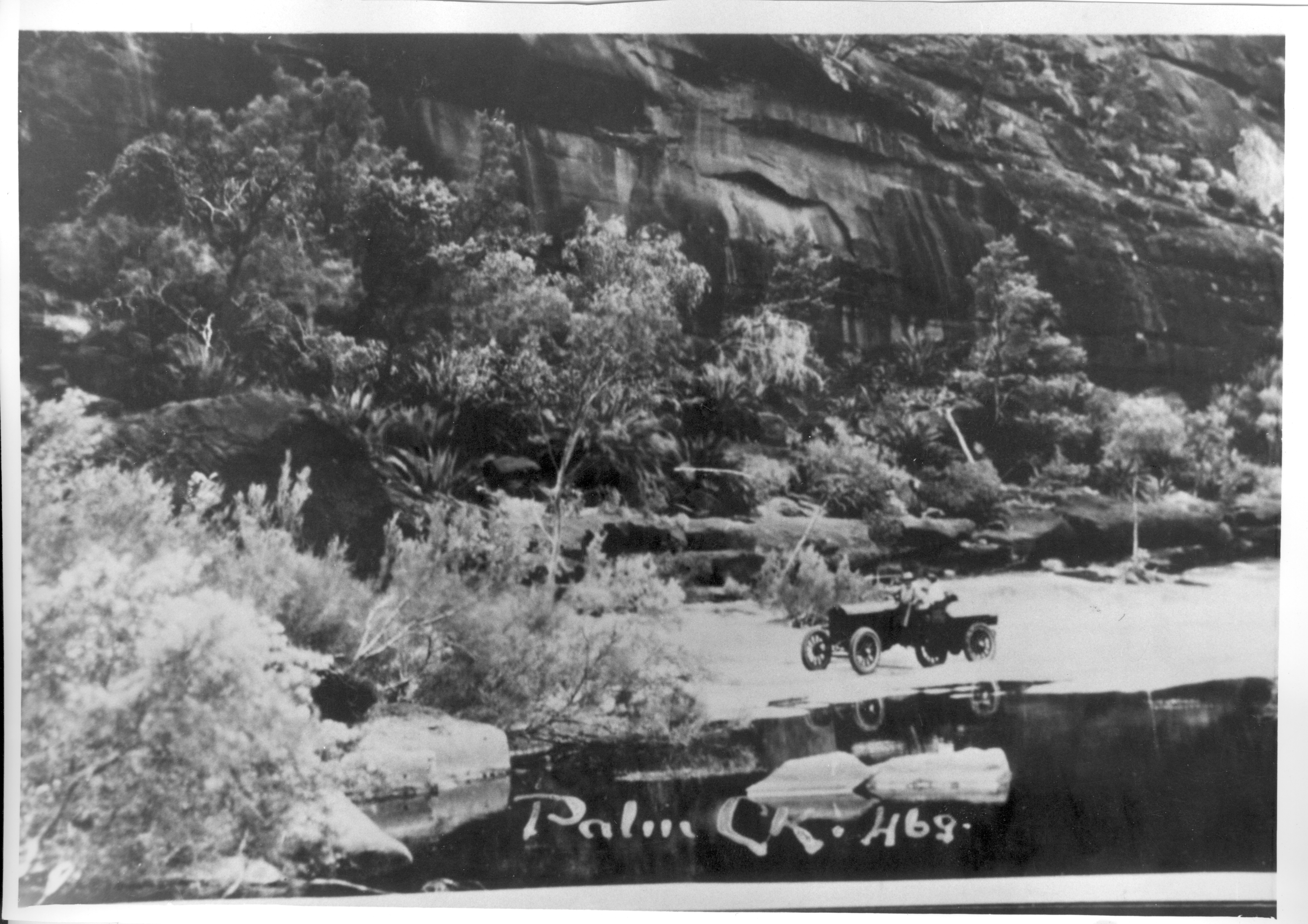
Gerhardt Johannsen in a car at Palm Valley in the 1920s

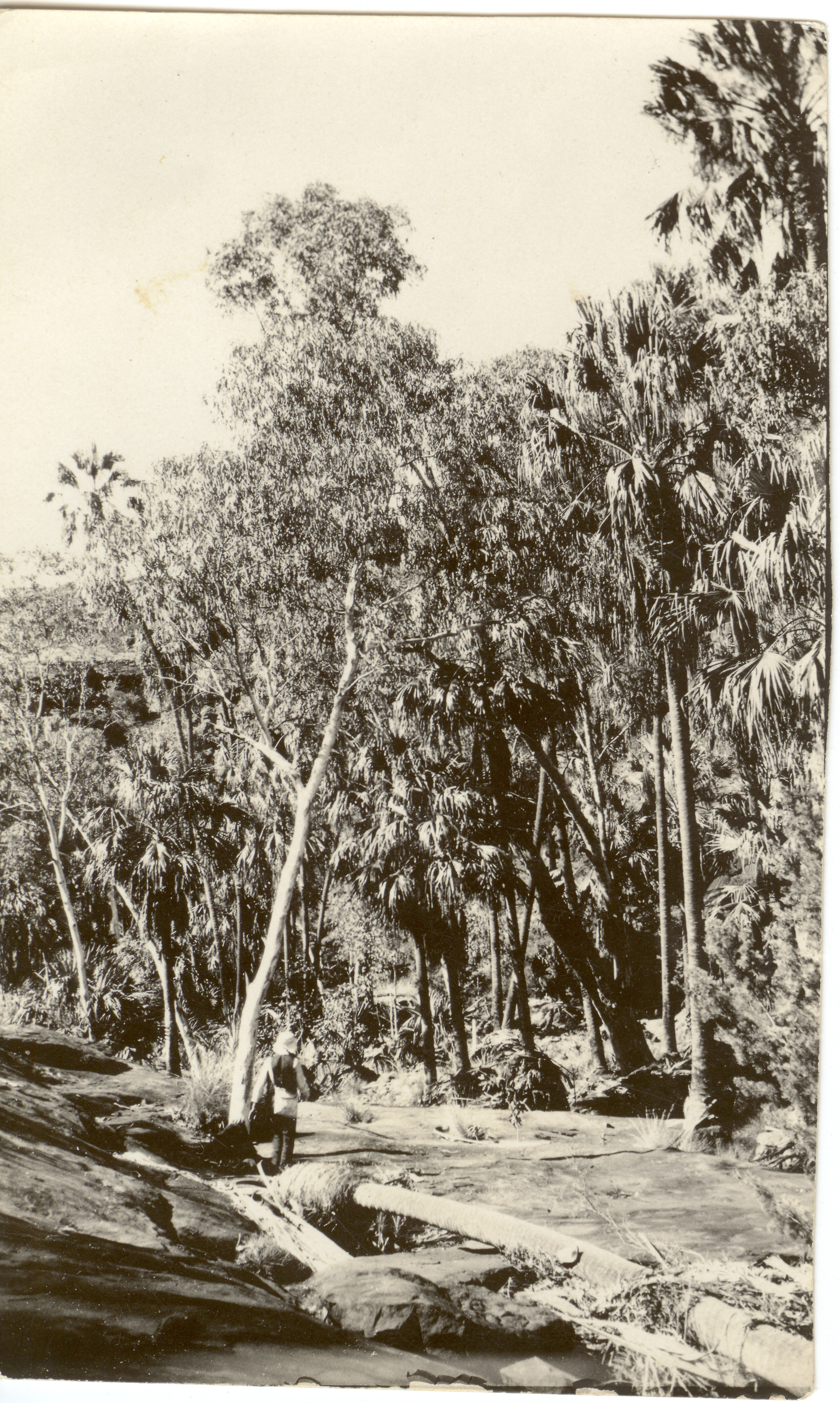
Palm Valley in the 1920s

Palm Valley in 1922 or 1923; the image later tinted by Trudy Hayes

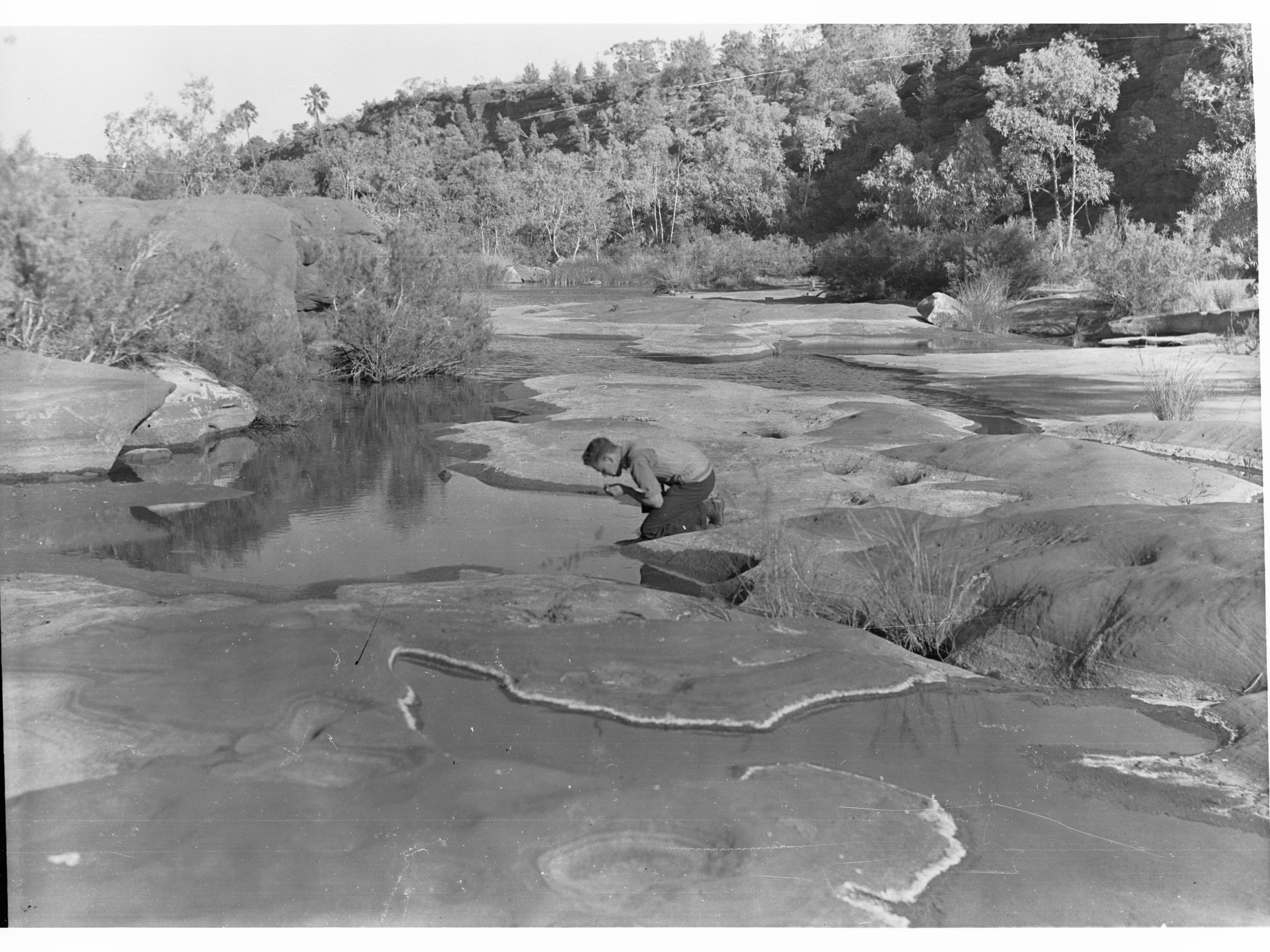
A man washing himself in Palm Valley, 1935

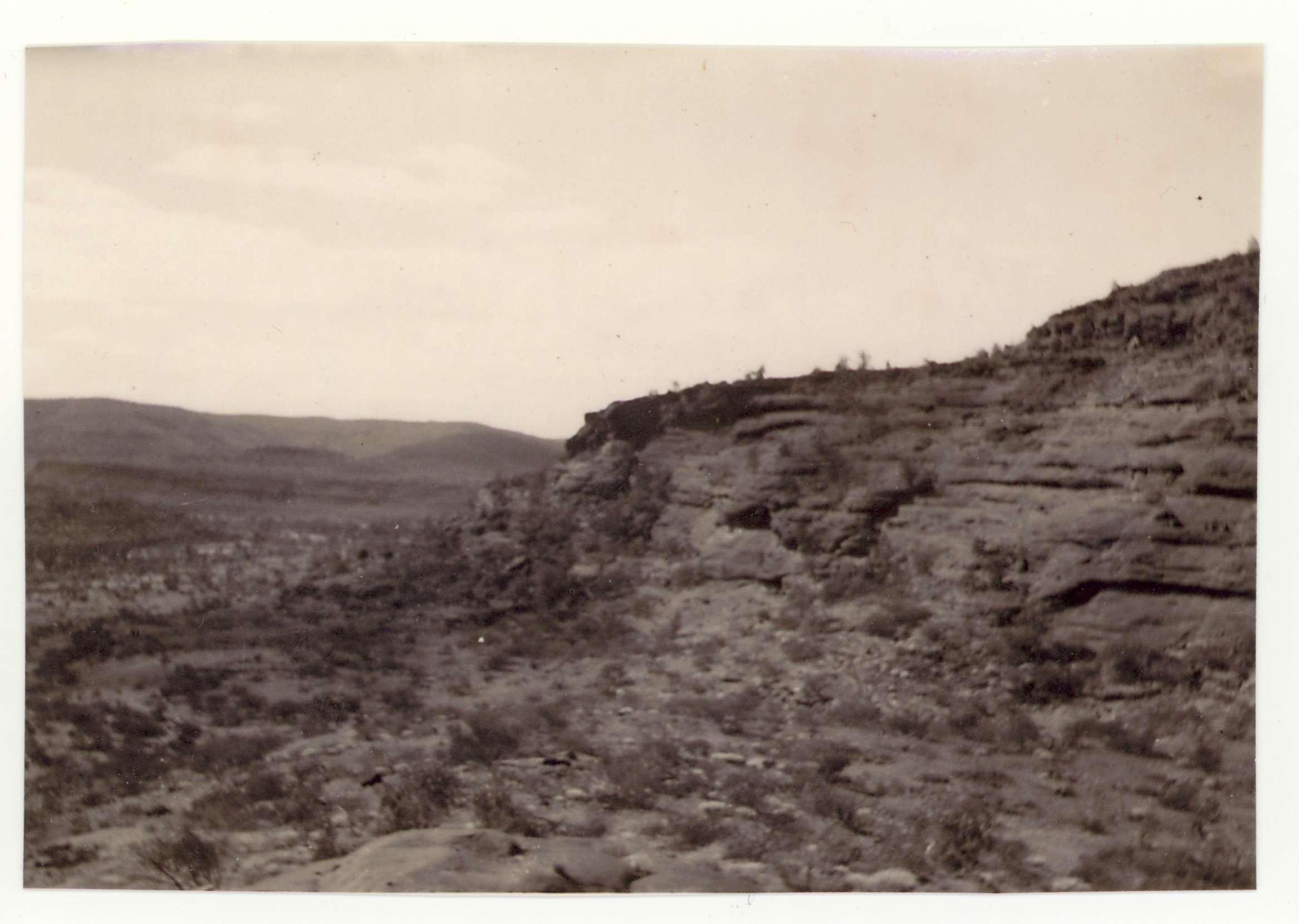
Palm Valley in 1946

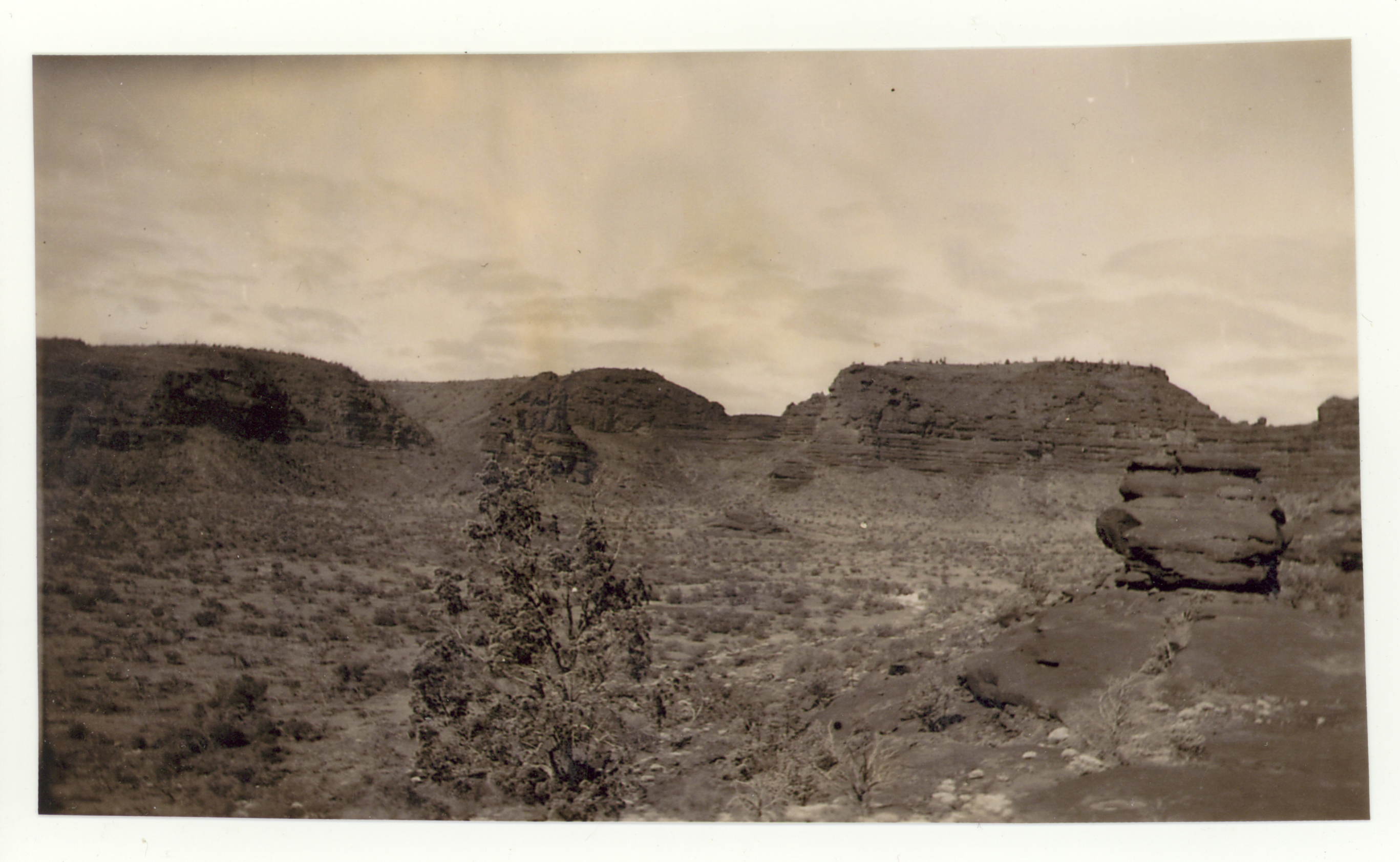
Palm Valley in 1946

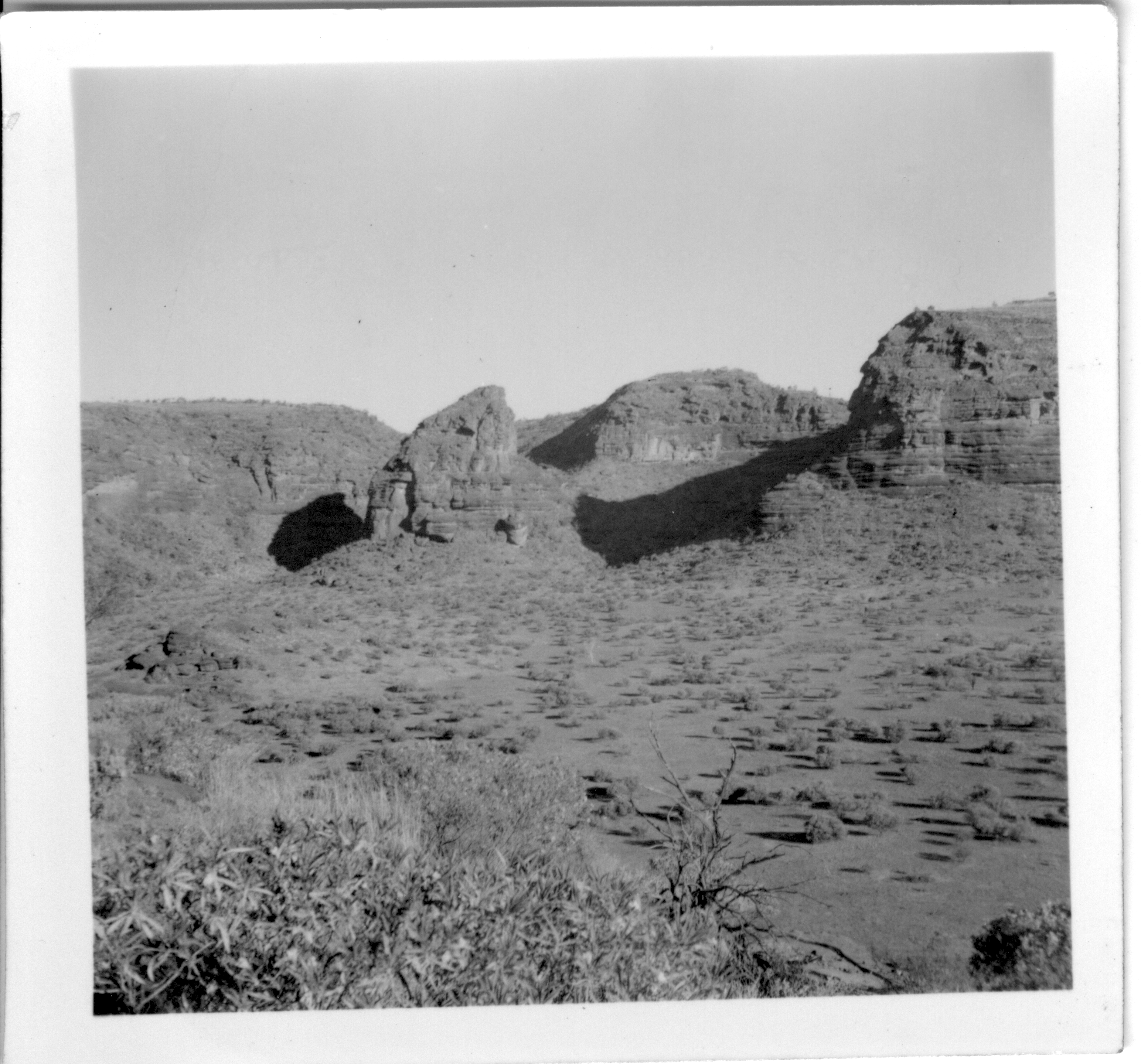
The Amphitheatre, Palm Valley, c1955

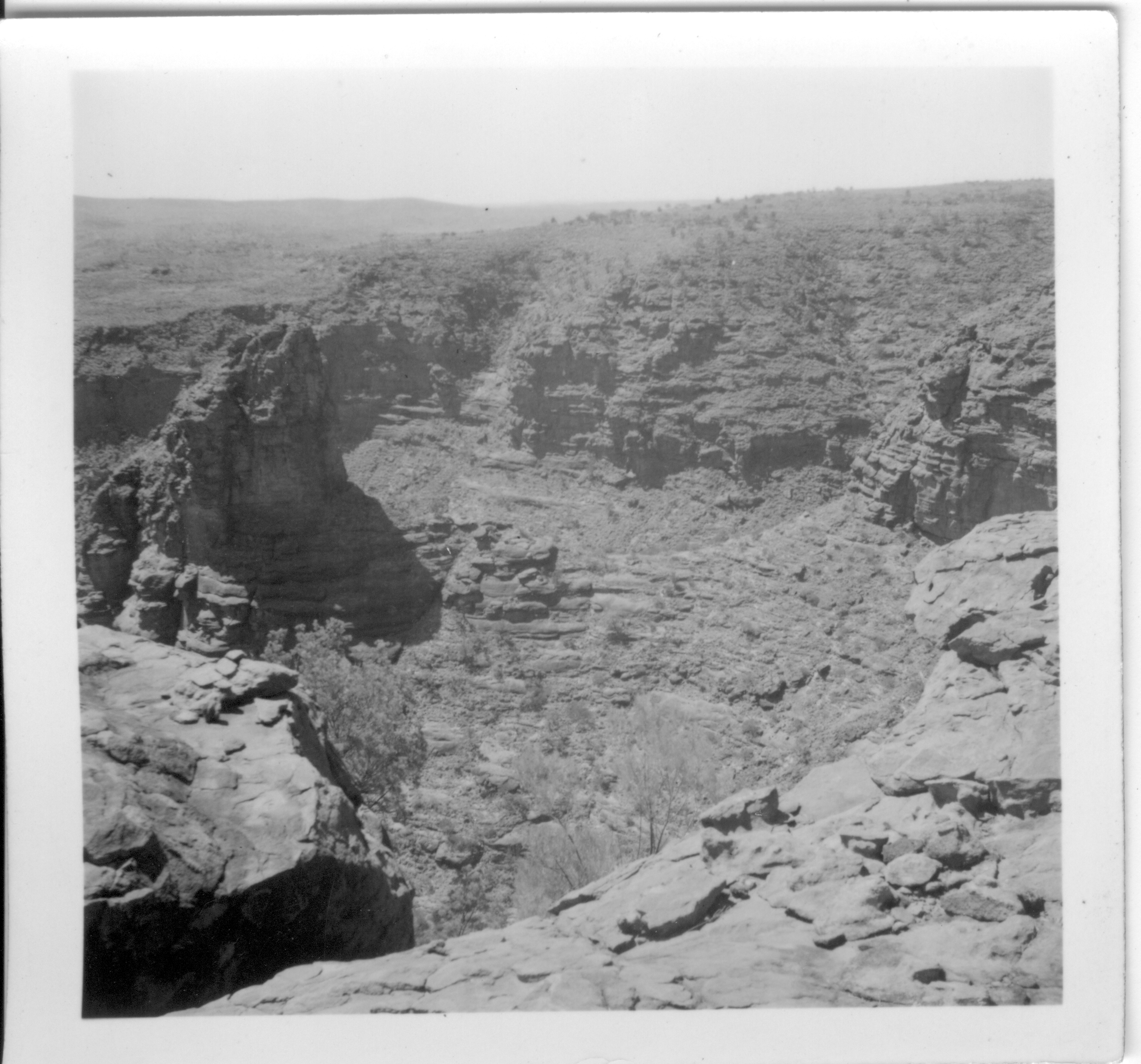
The Amphitheatre, Palm Valley, c1955

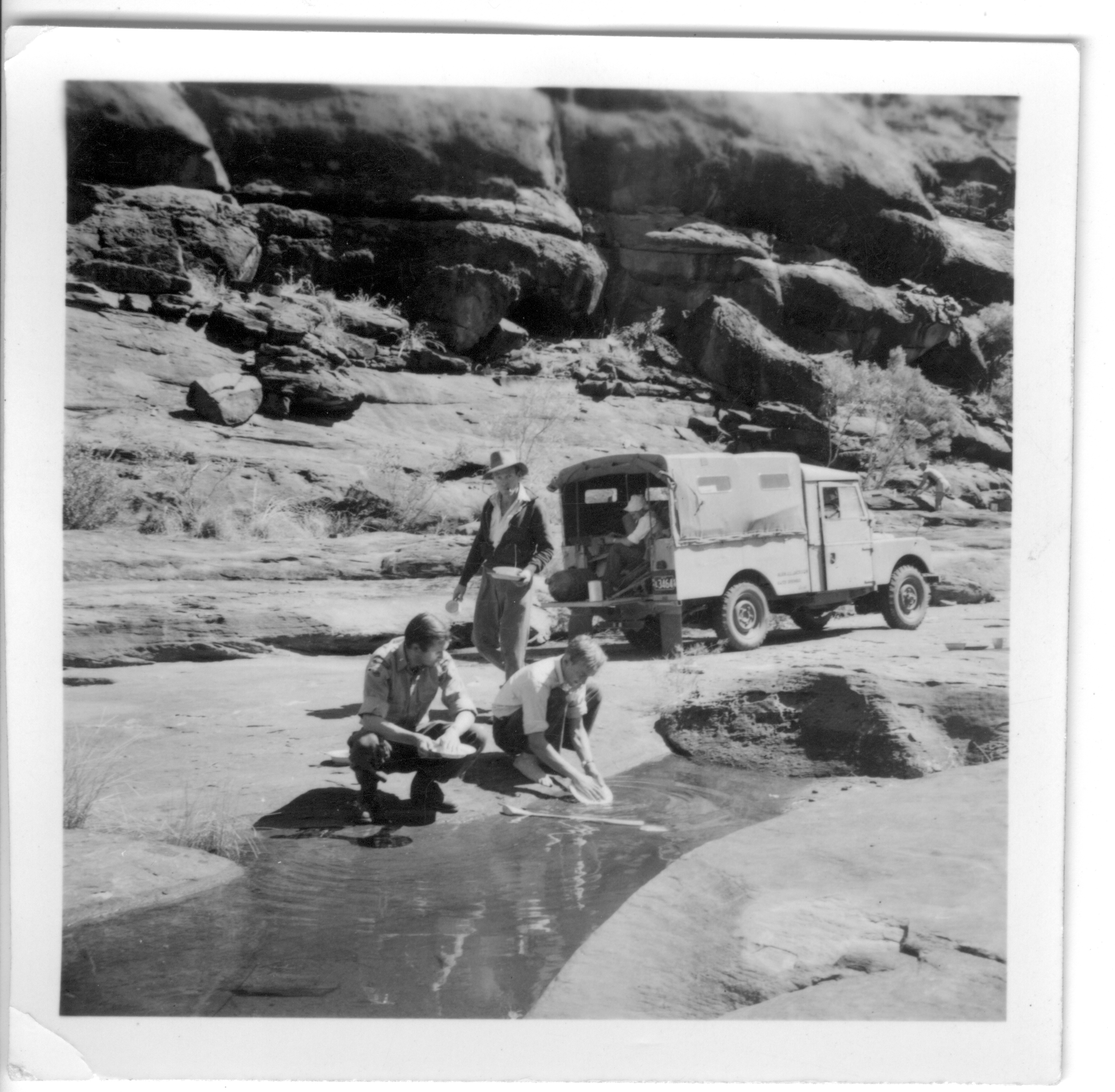
Washing dishes in a Palm Valley waterhole, c1955

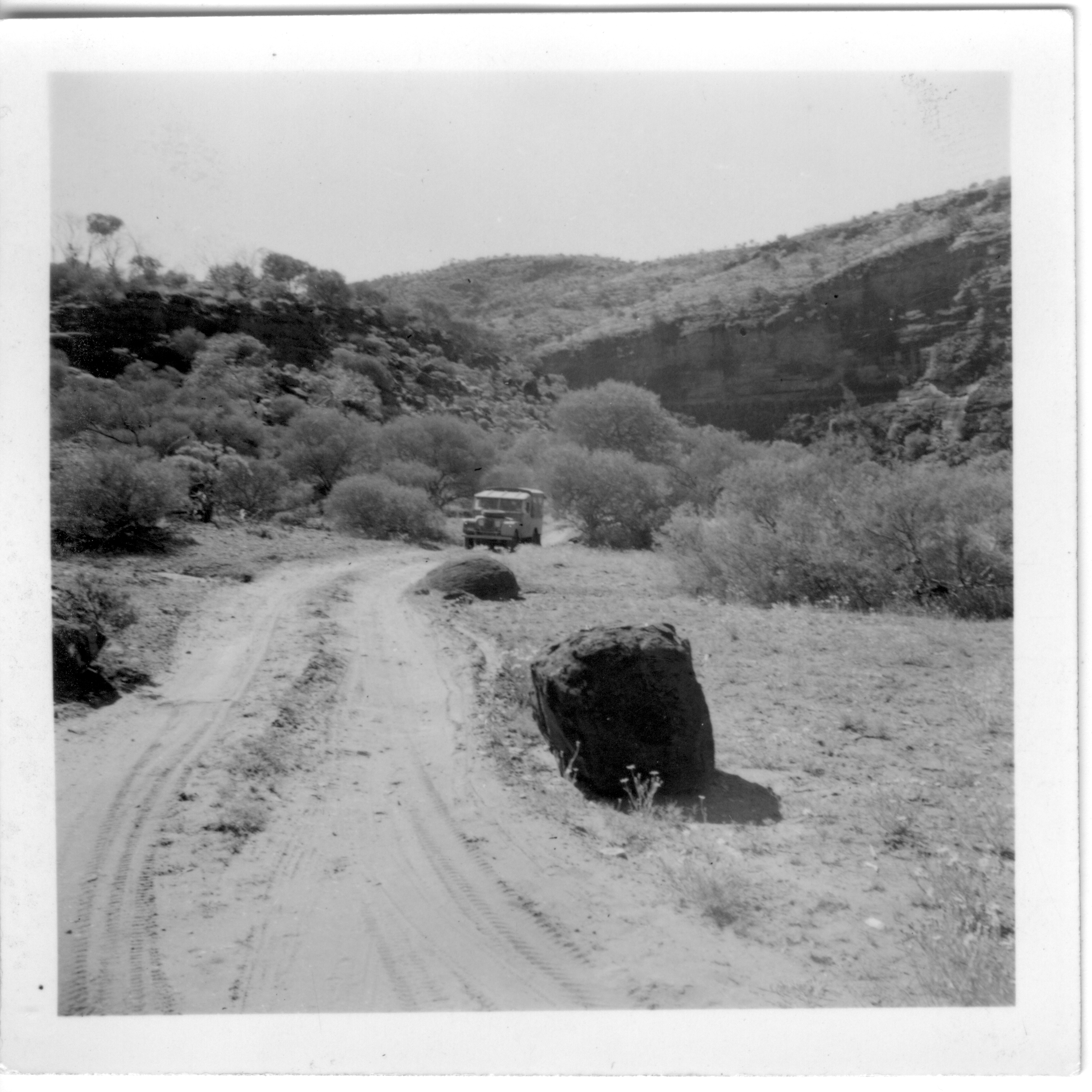
The track into Palm Valley, c1955

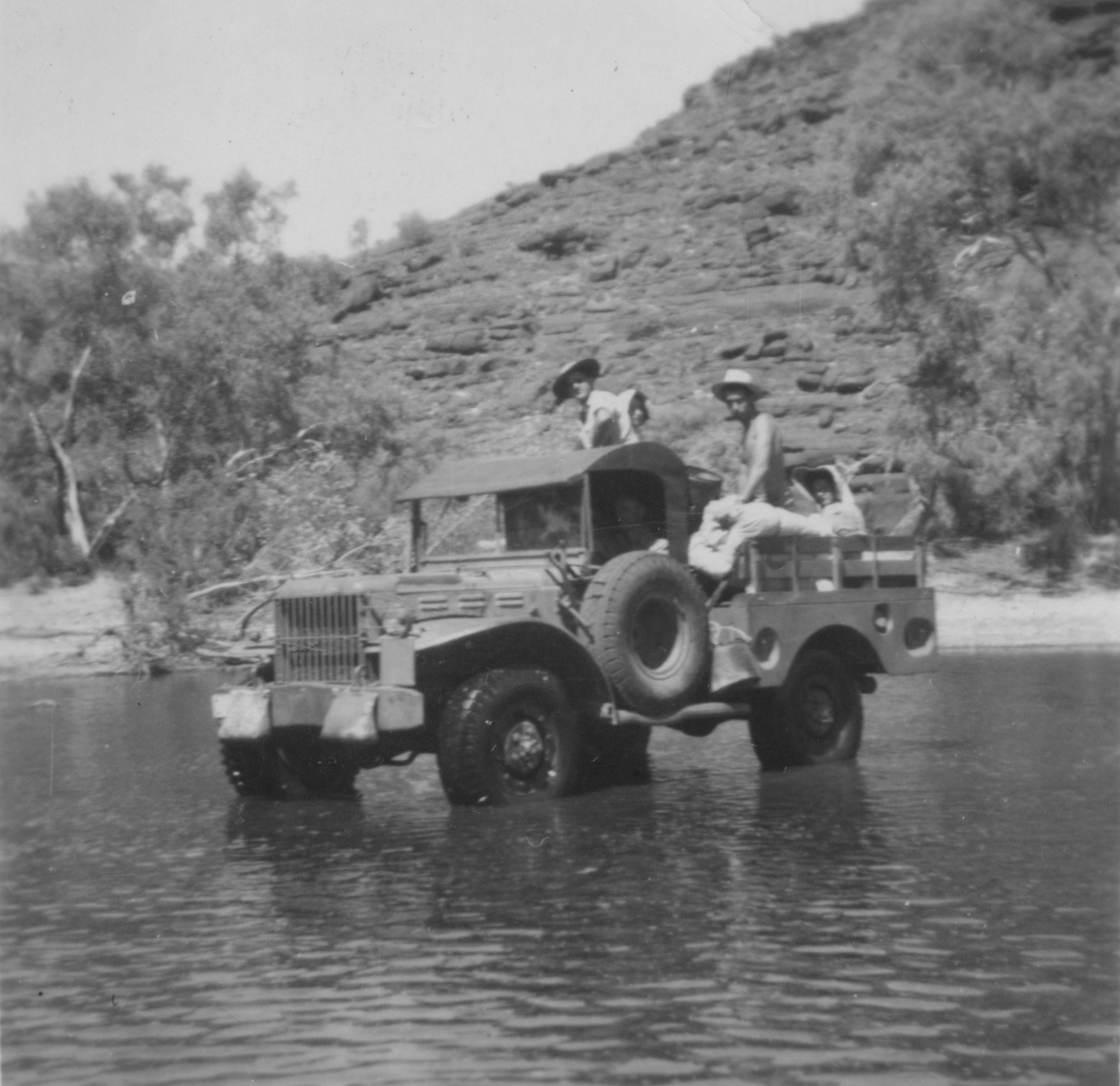
Weapon carrier crossing the Finke River on the way to Palm Valley, Easter, 1968.
