= Finke Gorge National Park =

Land in the Northern Territory, Australia

- IUCN category V (protected landscape/seascape)
- Finke Gorge National Park map

- Location within Northern Territory
- Location: Northern Territory, Namatjira
- Nearest city: Alice Springs
- Coordinates: 23°40′00″S 132°39′00″E
- Area: 452.85 km^{2} (174.85 sq mi)
- Established: 28 October 1966
- Visitors: 18000 (in 2022)
- Governing body: Parks and Wildlife Commission of the Northern Territory
- Website: Official website

Finke Gorge National Park is a protected area in the Northern Territory of Australia located about 1,318 kilometres (819 mi) south of the territory capital of Darwin. The national park covers an area of 458 km^{2} (177 sq mi), and includes the desert oasis Palm Valley, home to a diverse range of plant species, many of which are rare and unique to the area. There are good opportunities for bushwalking and bushcamping in the national park.

== Heritage ==
The national park is noted for its ancient palms and Aboriginal cultural sites. The Central Australian Cabbage Palm is found only in Palm Valley and prolifically here. There are around 3000 full grown palms and thousands of small seedlings sprinkled across the park which can get easily trampled by the visitors. Thus the visitors are required to walk along the marked paths to avoid destroying the seedlings. The Finke River is claimed to be one of the oldest catchments in the world, with areas dating back 350 million years.

The national park and nearby areas hold cultural significance to the Western Arrernte Aboriginal people and there is also evidence of early European settlement.

In 1980, it was listed on the now-defunct Register of the National Estate.

== Access ==
A four-wheel-drive route down the Finke River to Illamurta Springs and Watarrka National Park begins at Finke Gorge. Bush walking is another common activity. Kalaranga lookout is an easy 20 minute climb, with views of the rock amphitheatre encircled by rugged cliffs. The Mpaara Walk introduces the mythology of the Western Arrernte Aboriginal culture. In Palm Valley, the Arankaia Walk and the longer Mpulungkinya Walk meander among slender palms, returning across a scenic plateau.

== Gallery ==
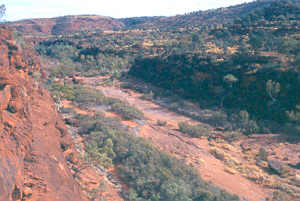
Palm Valley, located in the national park

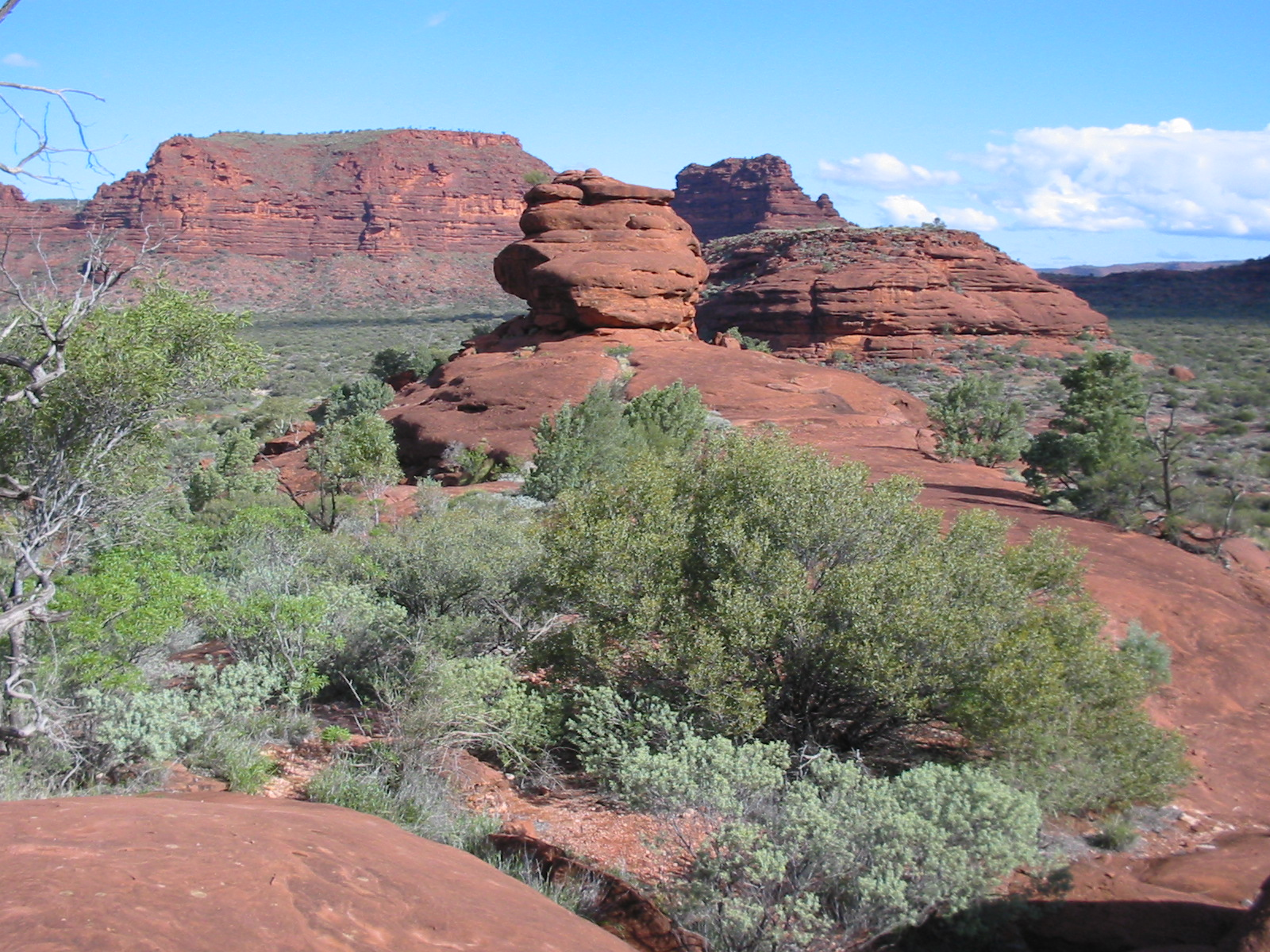
Amphitheatre

== See also ==
- Protected areas of the Northern Territory
