= Channel Island Leprosarium =

Australian quarantine station for leprosy

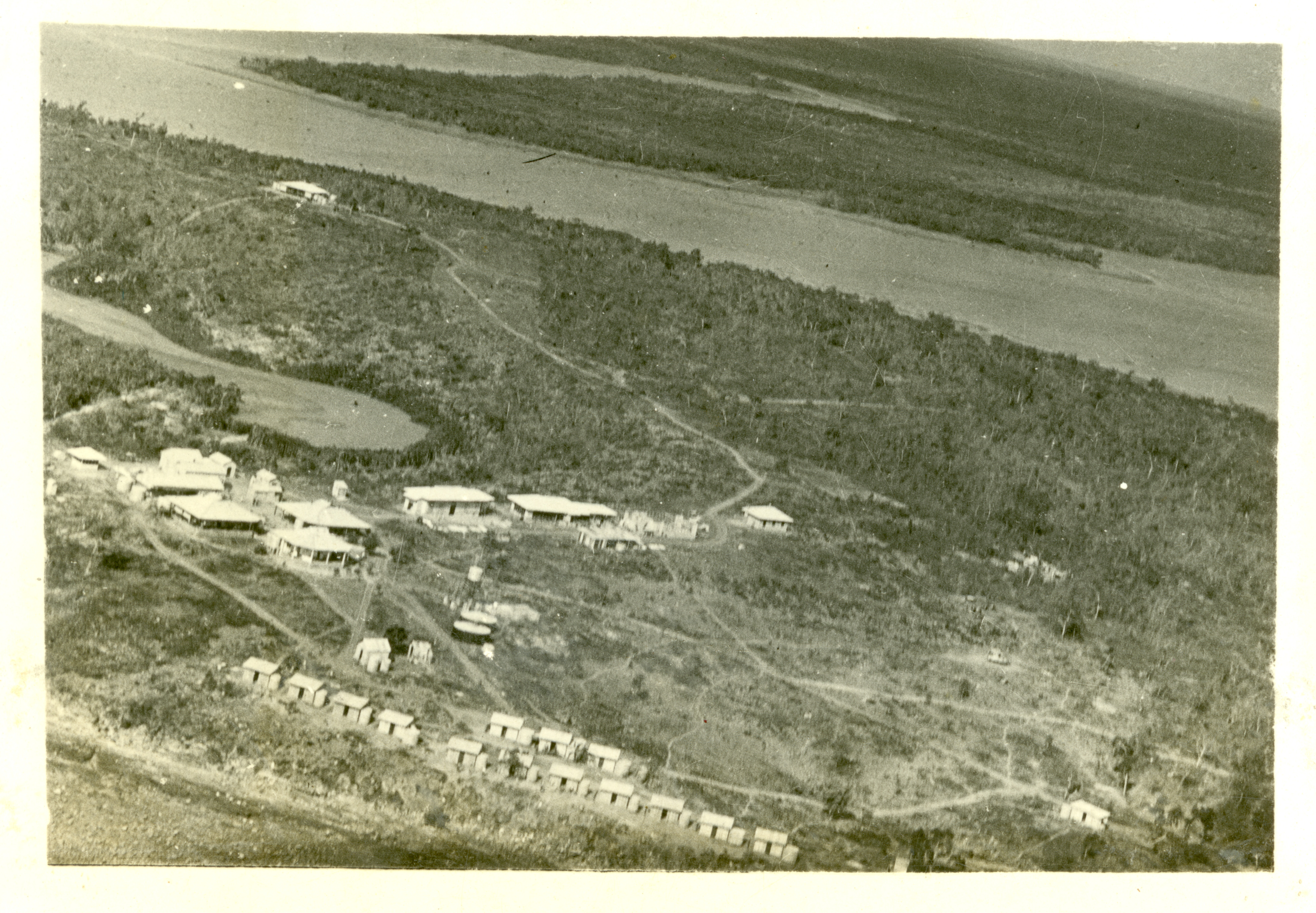
Channel Island Leprosarium, c. 1930

The Channel Island Leprosarium was a quarantine station that operated as a colony for people suffering from leprosy in the Northern Territory of Australia from 1931 to 1955. Channel Island forms part of Middle Arm, located just south of Darwin.

== History ==
The Channel Island Leprosarium was opened in 1931 replacing the Mud Island Lazaret. Sisters from the Daughters of Our Lady of the Sacred Heart took over the health service in 1947. An increase in leprosy cases in the 1950s led to overcrowding and the facility was closed in 1955. It was replaced by The East Arm Leprosarium on the mainland.

Patients were compulsorily isolated, were often treated poorly and were cut off from their families.

The site was heritage listed in February 1997. Many buildings have fallen into disrepair, and there are some foundations, collapsed huts and wall structures that remain. The bodies of at least 60 patients are buried on site.
