= Ron Goodin Power Station =

- Country: Australia
- Location: Alice Springs
- Coordinates: 23°42′32″S 133°53′25″E
- Status: Operational
- Commission date: 1973; 53 years ago
- Owner: Territory Generation
- Operator: Territory Generation

Thermal power station
- Primary fuel: Natural gas
- Secondary fuel: Diesel

Power generation
- Nameplate capacity: 45 MW

External links
- Website: territorygeneration.com.au/home/our-power-stations/locations/ron-goodin-power-station/

Ron Goodin Power Station is a power station in Alice Springs in the southern part of the Northern Territory of Australia. It was commissioned in 1973 by the Northern Territory government. It is now owned and operated by Territory Generation.

Ron Goodin Power Station is close to Alice Springs and is now close to housing surrounding a golf course. It is intended to be decommissioned when an upgrade to the Owen Springs Power Station is completed in an industrial estate further from residential land.
