= Katherine Power Station =

- Country: Australia
- Location: Katherine
- Coordinates: 14°27′32″S 132°14′40″E
- Status: Operational
- Commission date: 1987
- Owner: Territory Generation
- Operator: Territory Generation

Thermal power station
- Primary fuel: Natural gas
- Secondary fuel: Diesel

Power generation
- Units operational: 4
- Nameplate capacity: 36.5 MW

External links
- Website: territorygeneration.com.au/about-us/our-power-stations/

Katherine Power Station is a natural gas-fired power station in the Northern Territory of Australia located at Cossack near the town of Katherine. The power station is owned and operated by Territory Generation and supplies the Darwin-Katherine Interconnected System. The dual-fuel station can also independently provide power to Katherine in the event of disruptions across the regional grid, such as when gas supply was interrupted to Channel Island Power Station near Darwin during 2014. The generators in Katherine were able to use a back up supply of diesel fuel to minimise blackouts in the town.

The power station was commissioned in 1987 with three generators providing a total capacity of 24.5 MW. A fourth unit was added in 2012, increasing this to 36.5 MW. The older units are planned to be decommissioned in 2026–27, however by this time it is expected that the Eni group's 25 MW solar farm north of the town will be fully operational.
