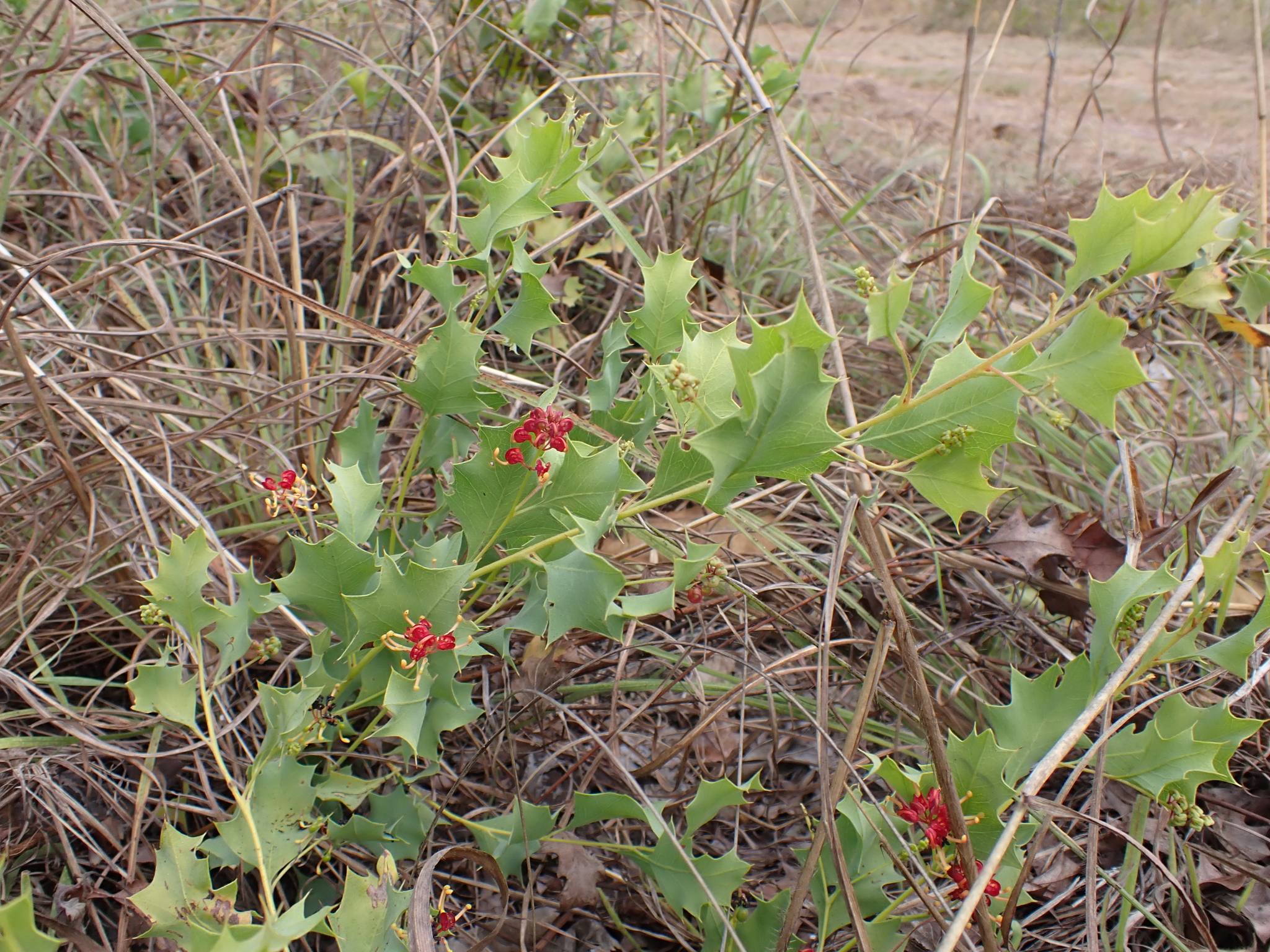

Conservation status
- Endangered (IUCN 3.1)

Scientific classification
- Kingdom: Plantae
- Clade: Embryophytes
- Clade: Tracheophytes
- Clade: Angiosperms
- Clade: Eudicots
- Order: Proteales
- Family: Proteaceae
- Genus: Grevillea
- Species: G. longicuspis

Binomial name
- Grevillea longicuspis McGill.

= Grevillea longicuspis =

Species of shrub endemic to Australia

Grevillea longicuspis is a species of flowering plant in the family Proteaceae and is endemic to a small area of the Northern Territory in Australia. It is a shrub with divided leaves that are egg-shaped in outline with sharply-pointed teeth or lobes, and clusters of red flowers with a red or creamy pink style.

== Description ==
Grevillea longicuspis is a shrub that typically grows to a height of 0.6–1 m (2 ft 0 in – 3 ft 3 in), its branchlets and leaves partly covered with glandular hairs. Its leaves are egg-shaped in outline, 25–80 mm (0.98–3.15 in) long and 120–60 mm (4.7–2.4 in) wide on a petiole 5–14 mm (0.20–0.55 in) long, and are usually divided with four to eight sharply-pointed triangular teeth or lobes. The flowers are arranged in more or less spherical to oval clusters on the ends of branches or in upper leaf axils on a rachis 3–18 mm (0.12–0.71 in) long, each flower on a pedicel 2.0–3.5 mm (0.079–0.138 in) long. The flowers are red and glabrous, the style red to pinkish- or lemony-cream, the pistil 6.5–9.5 mm (0.26–0.37 in) long. Flowering occurs from August to December and the fruit is a glabrous, oblong follicle 9.5–12.5 mm (0.37–0.49 in) long.

== Distribution and habitat ==
This grevillea grows in open woodland in sandy soil, and is restricted to a small area near Darwin in the Northern Territory.

== Conservation status ==
Grevillea longicuspis is listed as near threatened under the Northern Territory Government Territory Parks and Wildlife Act, and as 'Endangered' in the IUCN Red List.
