= Berrimah Power Station =

Power station in Australia

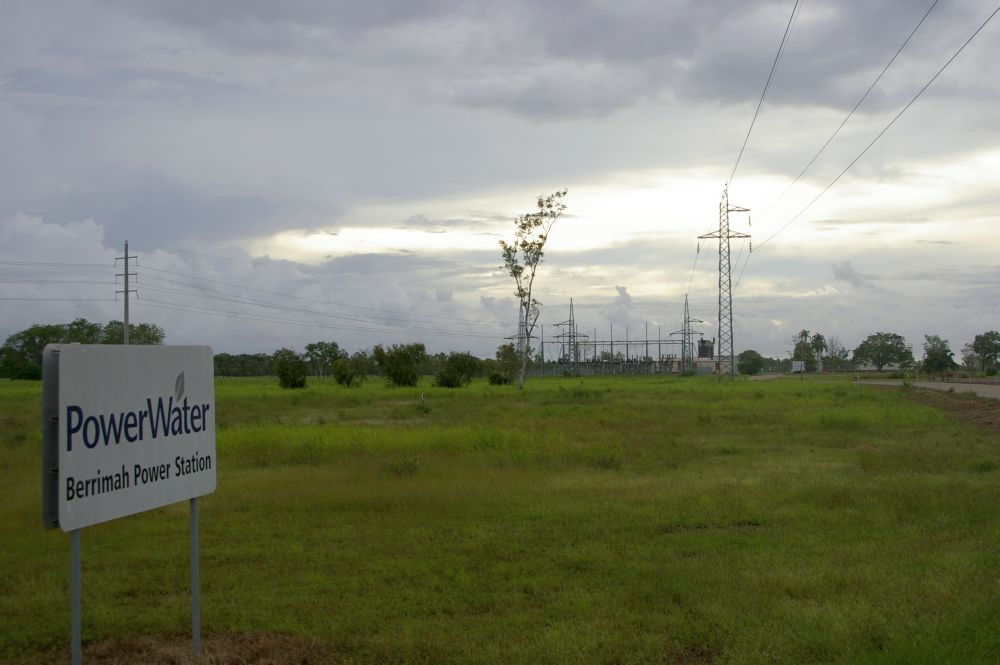
- Berrimah Power Station
- Country: Australia
- Location: Darwin, Northern Territory
- Coordinates: 12°25′34″S 130°55′11″E
- Status: Operational
- Commission date: 1979
- Owner: PowerWater

Thermal power station
- Primary fuel: Natural gas

Power generation
- Units operational: 2
- Make and model: JT4A (2)
- Nameplate capacity: 32.5 MW

External links
- Commons: Related media on Commons

Berrimah Power Station is a kerosene-fuelled power station in Berrimah, Northern Territory, Australia. Owned by PowerWater, it only generates electricity on an emergency and standby basis.

The Berrimah Power Station was built and commissioned in 1979 after a number of faults with the Stokes Hill Power Station.

Originally, it had 30MW capacity (3 × 10MW) but as of February 2012, only one unit is still operational, with the other two having been decommissioned.

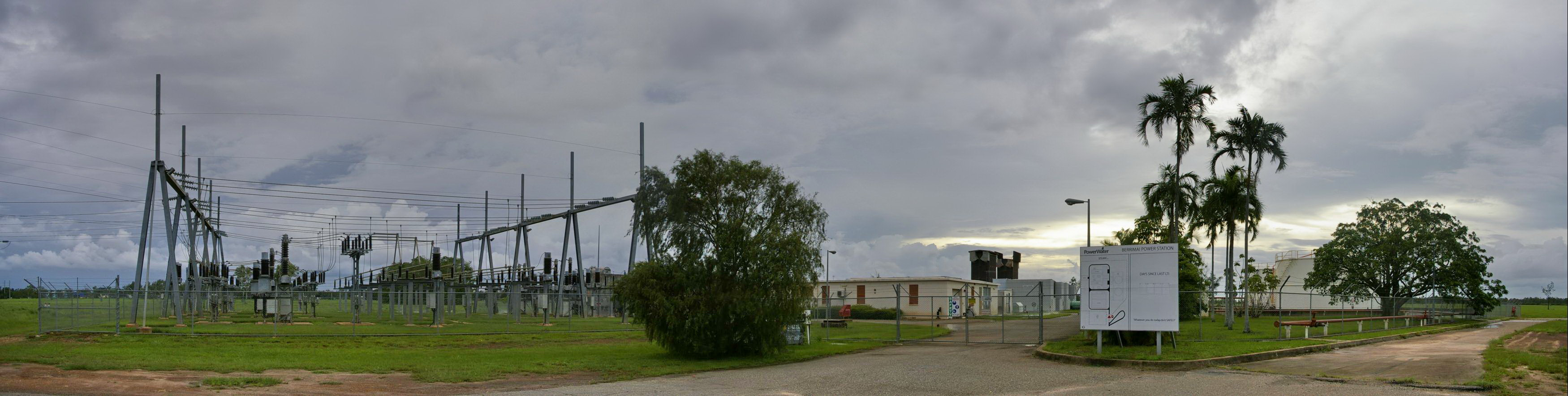
Berrimah Power Station panorama
