= Channel Island, Northern Territory =

Channel Island Outer Metropolitan Darwin, Northern Territory
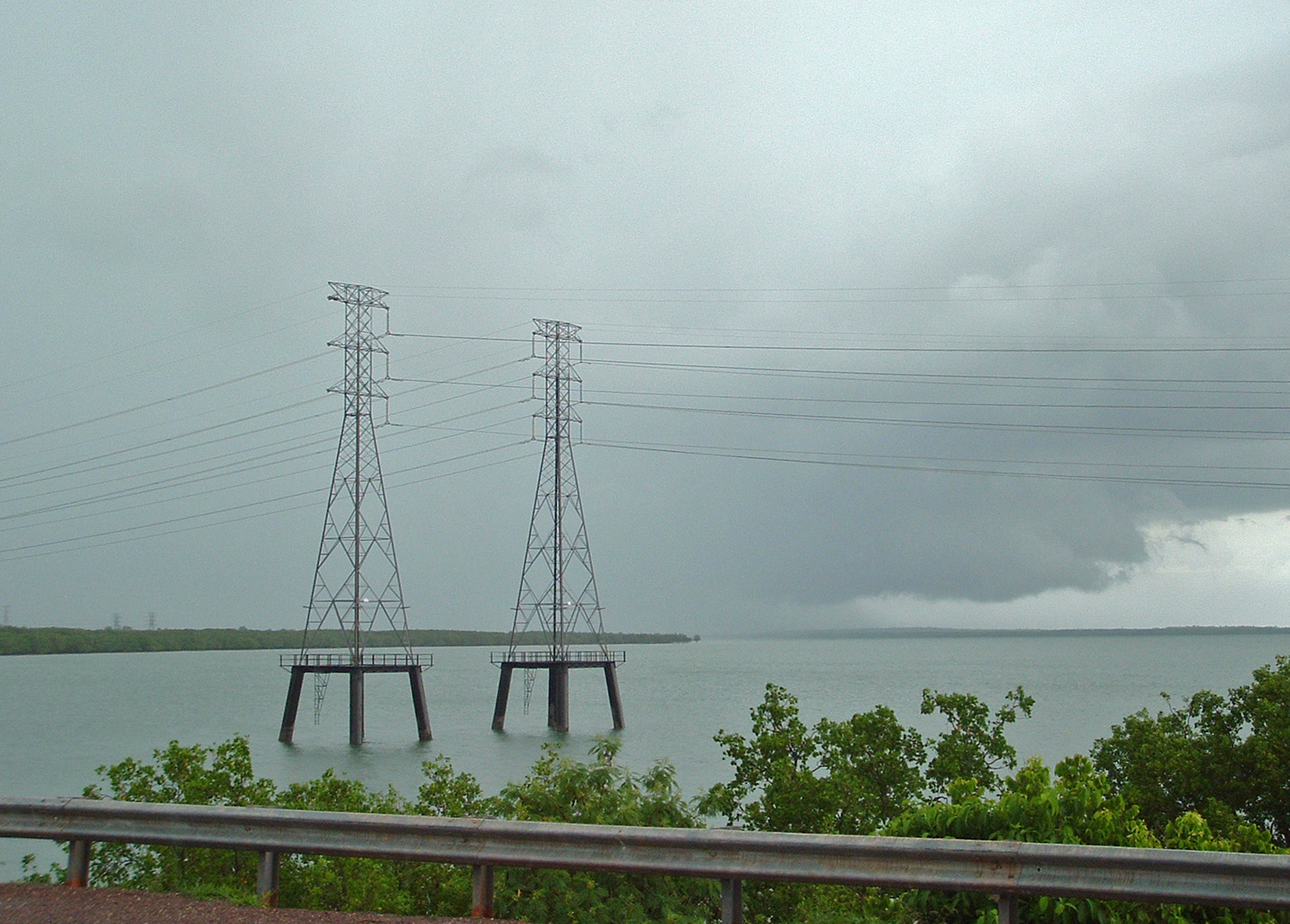
- Electricity pylon carrying High voltage power from the power station at Channel Island, Northern Territory.

- Coordinates: 12°33′S 130°52′E
- Population: 0 (2016 census)
- Established: 21 April 2004
- Postcode(s): 0822
- LGA(s): Litchfield Municipality
- Territory electorate(s): Daly
- Federal division(s): Lingiari
Suburbs around Channel Island:
Darwin Harbour	Wickham	Wickham
Darwin Harbour	Channel Island	Wickham
Cox Peninsula	Cox Peninsula	Wickham; Cox Peninsula
- Footnotes: Adjoining suburbs

Channel Island is a suburb in the Middle Arm region of Darwin in the Northern Territory of Australia. It is located in the local government area of Litchfield. Channel Island Power Station and the Darwin Aquaculture Centre are located on the island.

== History ==
There was a leprosarium on Channel Island in the early 20th century. It was at a time when many Aboriginal people who were thought to have leprosy or other infectious diseases were sent to lock hospitals and leprosariums. They were often treated poorly, and they were cut off from their families.

Channel Island was the first quarantine venue in Northern Territory. The facilities and a hospital for quarantine purposes were established at Channel Island in 1914.
