= Weddell Power Station =

- Country: Australia
- Location: Wickham, Northern Territory
- Coordinates: 12.57722222°S 130.95000000°E
- Status: Operational
- Commission date: 2008
- Owner: Territory Generation
- Operator: Territory Generation

Thermal power station
- Primary fuel: Natural gas

Power generation
- Make and model: 3x GE LM6000 PD
- Nameplate capacity: 129 MW

External links
- Website: territorygeneration.com.au/about-us/our-power-stations/

Weddell Power Station is a 129 MW natural gas-fired power station in the Northern Territory, located at Wickham. Owned and operated by Territory Generation, it is the second largest power station in the Northern Territory and supplies the Darwin-Katherine Interconnected System.

== History ==
Construction began in 2007 and the station was commissioned by PowerWater in 2008, initially with two General Electric LM6000PD gas turbines, brought online in 2008 and 2009 respectively, providing an installed capacity of 86 MW. At the time of commissioning, these generators were the largest single units in the Darwin-Katherine power network, with each delivering approximately 10% of the total capacity. The facility is connected to the privately operated 11.6 km (7.2 mi) Wickham Point Pipeline, completed in July 2009. This allows the generators to be fed by both offshore projects via the Darwin Liquefied Natural Gas Plant, or through the existing pipeline linking Darwin with the Amadeus Basin gas fields.

A third General Electric unit was planned to be commissioned in 2011, however it was not until 2014 that it was installed and became operational, boosting the power station's capacity to 129 MW. The total cost of construction of all three units was $126.6 million. As part of this upgrade, the power station's control systems were upgraded and integrated with the systems at Channel Island Power Station, allowing the facility to be operated remotely.
