= Channel Island Power Station =

Power station in the Northern Territory of Australia

- Country: Australia
- Location: Channel Island, Northern Territory
- Coordinates: 12.554503°S 130.8665437°E
- Status: Operational
- Commission date: 1986
- Owner: Territory Generation
- Operator: Territory Generation

Thermal power station
- Primary fuel: Natural gas
- Secondary fuel: Diesel

Power generation
- Units operational: 6
- Units decommissioned: 1
- Nameplate capacity: 279 MW

External links
- Website: territorygeneration.com.au/home/our-power-stations/locations/channel-island-power-station/

Channel Island Power Station is the largest power station in the Northern Territory of Australia. It is positioned on an island in the Middle Arm of Darwin Harbour, supplying electricity to the Darwin-Katherine Interconnected System. It is currently owned and operated by Territory Generation. Most of the island surrounding the facility is protected from development as the Channel Island Conservation Reserve.

== History ==
Channel Island Power Station was built and commissioned in 1986 by the Power and Water Authority, a predecessor of PowerWater, replacing the Stokes Hill Power Station. At the time of commissioning, Channel Island was the first combined cycle power plant in Australia, and the first to feature distributive digital control systems with screen-based controls.

In 2008, it was supplemented by the nearby Weddell Power Station which became operational that year, however Channel Island still provided 48% of the Territory's total power generation, with an installed capacity of 232 MW in 2010. At that time, plant in use at Channel Island included 5 General Electric generators capable of running on either natural gas or diesel fuel in addition to a more modern 40MW GE LM6000 gas turbine generator installed by Leighton Contractors. A steam turbine was also in place to generate electricity from waste heat produced by units C4 and C5.

Two new Rolls-Royce Trent 60 gas turbines were commissioned to expand the capacity of the power station in 2011. These two turbines can each generate 58MW of electricity and collectively increased the generation capacity on the Darwin-Katherine power system by 25%.

Between 2011 and 2014, the power station's control systems were integrated with all three units at Weddell Power Station, allowing centralised control from Channel Island. Ownership of both facilities transferred to Territory Generation when it was separated from PowerWater in 2014.

As of 2020, unit C3, an original 1986 General Electric Frame 6 type generator was undergoing decommissioning. This reduced the power station's capacity from 310 MW to 279 MW, however it still remains the main facility generating base load for the regional grid.

== Renewable energy ==
In 2021 the Government of the Northern Territory awarded a tender for the construction of a 35 MVA battery storage power station to be built at Channel Island. At a cost of $45 million, the Darwin-Katherine Battery Energy Storage System will replace the decommissioned gas-fired unit and support the expansion renewable energy across the region such as by supporting the connection of rooftop solar panels to the grid.

Also in 2021, Territory Generation ordered a trailer-mounted GE TM2500 aeroderivative gas turbine for Channel Island. Rated at 22 MW, this unit is capable of running on renewable hydrogen and is compatible with the Battery Energy Storage System currently being installed. The remaining thermal units, C1 and 2, and C4 and 5 along with the waste heat turbine were expected to be decommissioned in 2026–27, with similar small hydrogen capable units the most likely replacement. In 2025, three of the generators were planned to be kept operational into the 2030s.
