= Burns Philp Building =

There are several historic buildings known as the Burns Philip Building for their association with company Burns Philp:

- Burns Philp Building, Sydney
- Burns Philp Building, Normanton
- Burns Philp Building, Townsville
