= Burns Philp Building, Normanton =

Former warehouse in Queensland, Australia

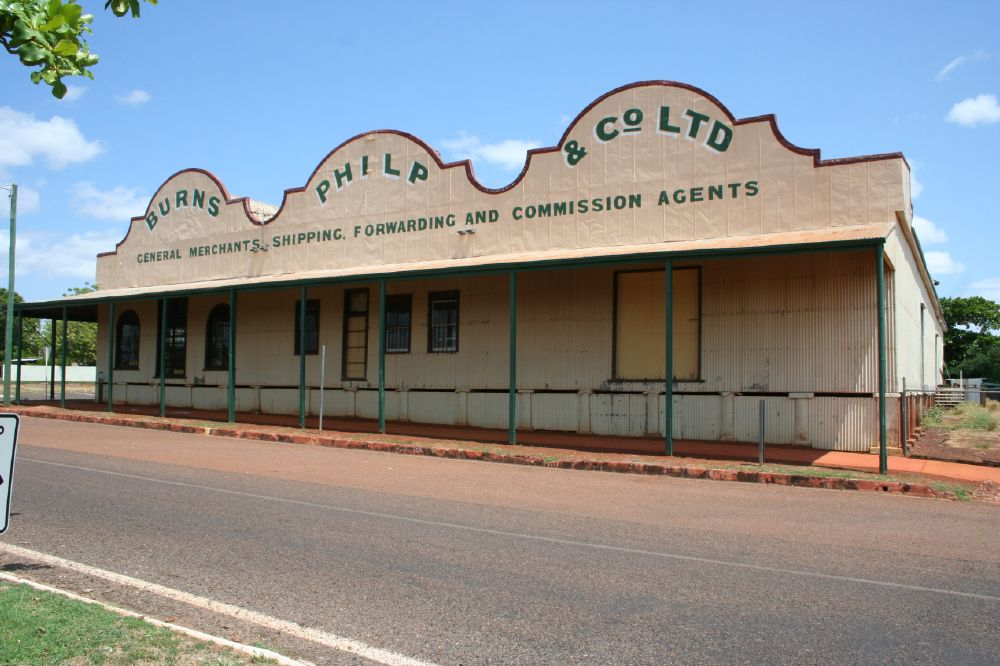
- Burns Philp Building, 2010

- Location within Queensland Location within Australia
- 17.6676°S 141.0814°E
- Location: Corner of Landsborough Street and Caroline Street, Normanton, Shire of Carpentaria, Queensland, Australia

Queensland Heritage Register
- Official name: Burns Philp Building (former)
- Type: state heritage (built)
- Designated: 14 October 2011
- Reference no.: 602781
- Builders: Andrew Murphie

Burns Philp Building is a heritage-listed former warehouse at the corner of Landsborough Street and Caroline Street, Normanton, Shire of Carpentaria, Queensland, Australia. It was built by Andrew Murphie. It was added to the Queensland Heritage Register on 14 October 2011.

== History ==
The former Burns Philp building in Normanton is located on the corner of Caroline and Landsborough streets (Burke Developmental Road), on a site close to the former town wharves and opposite the site of the former Customs House. This locality was strategically important for a store, because all goods and services were transported by boat along the Norman River. The large timber-framed and metal-clad warehouse-style building, built in 1884, occupies around one third of its 5,900 square metre allotment and is a dominant feature of the town, being visible from the air when flying into Normanton, and from the river when entering the town from the northern port of Karumba.

Normanton arose as the principal service town and port for the pastoral district of Burke, in lieu of Burketown, which was declared a port in 1864. The Burketown population was beset by a typhoid fever outbreak in 1866, leading to the abandonment of the settlement, and its relocation to Sweers Island, where a port was declared in March 1867. The search for an alternative port in the Gulf of Carpentaria led to the January 1867 exploration conducted by William Landsborough and Government Surveyor George Phillips. They chose a site for a township on the western bank of the river which they named the Norman, in honour of Captain William Henry Norman, the Commander of the HMVS Victoria, which had accompanied Landsborough's brig Firefly to the gulf in his earlier 1861 quest to find Burke and Wills. The town site was on an ironstone ridge, which was thought to be above flood and high tide levels. The Town of Norman was gazetted in August 1868, and became the most important centre in the Gulf, known as Normanton. Cattle stations throughout the area, from as far south as Cloncurry and Georgetown, procured their supplies from Normanton. Its importance was further entrenched with the opening of the overland telegraph line from Cardwell in January 1872, linking Normanton and Kimberley (now Karumba) to the main line between Brisbane and Townsville, which had been completed in 1869.

The Burns Philp Company evolved from the business that James Burns established in Townsville in 1873 from which he supplied goods to the mining towns of Charters Towers, Etheridge, Ravenswood, Hodgkinson and Palmer River. Burns suffered from recurring bouts of malaria, and was advised by doctors to move to Sydney.| By October 1877 he had transferred his Townsville interests to Robert Philp, who had been managing the store in his absence. Philp expanded the business, building new wharves and warehouses along Ross Creek. Burns began a new business based in Macquarie Place in Sydney, establishing a fleet of sailing vessels plying their trade between Sydney and Townsville, while Philp expanded his operation by establishing bases in Cairns and Charters Towers.

The growth of towns servicing the grazing and mining industries in the Gulf led to the development of the combined business and shipping interests of Burns and Philp in that area. By March 1879, James Burns was running the schooner Dawn between Thursday Island and Normanton. He established a store at Normanton in July 1879, serviced every two months by it and the Rover. This store was reputedly relocated from Burketown, being the former store of Robert Towns. Within two months of opening this store, Burns had received £2,000 worth of orders for goods to transport to graziers in the district. The manager of the store issued its own £1 and £5 notes for use as change, in an environment where "legal tender" was hard to come by. The notes were used in Normanton and Thursday Island for a period of around ten years between 1880 and 1890.

Burns initiated his monopolisation of trade in the Gulf, with the takeover of his major competitor, Clifton and Aplin, in May 1880. It had been a pioneering mercantile firm in Townsville and the Gulf, establishing a store in Normanton around 1871 and one in Burketown in 1879.

By January 1881, James Burns was operating the steamer Corea between Sydney and Normanton, sometimes calling in at Burketown. The steamship Truganini was purchased in June 1881 to run between Thursday Island and Normanton. Along with the Corea, it soon became part of the fleet of the Queensland Steam Shipping Company, a London Corporation in which Burns and Philp jointly held £5,000 in shares. The deal also included ships of the British India Steam Navigation Company which had the mail contract from Britain, Singapore, and Batavia to Brisbane via Thursday Island and North Queensland ports. The Truganini operated the mail contract between Thursday Island and Normanton, which Burns had procured for £2,000 a year for three years. He further cemented his local monopoly by including clauses in the mail contracts, prioritising Burns and Philp cargo at cut rates. Burns then bought out the store of Theodore Amsden and Co. in Normanton, keeping Amsden on as manager. Also in mid-1881, Burns bought out a Thursday Island storekeeper, with Philp owning a share in that business as well. The new Burketown store of James Burns was opened by the end of March 1883.

In early 1883, the businesses of James Burns of Normanton and Sydney were amalgamated with that of Robert Philp of Townsville. Burns Philp & Company Limited was incorporated under New South Wales law with its registered office in Sydney. The nominal capital of the firm was £250,000, with 90% of the capital coming from Australian sources. The amalgamated company had assets in Sydney, Townsville, Normanton, Thursday Island, Cairns and Charters Towers, which included 22 vessels of all kinds, from ships to lighters, which were used to ferry goods and passengers from larger ships to the wharves. The company adopted a flag of red, white and blue, with a Scotch Thistle in the centre.

By September 1884, Burns Philp had taken over a number of small businesses in Burketown, and in October, builder Andrew Murphie was engaged in building a large warehouse for Burns Philp in Normanton which was claimed to be the company's largest in Queensland outside of Brisbane.

Normanton was thriving at that time. The foundation stone for the hospital, also built by Andrew Murphie, was laid on 1 December 1884; several new shops were under construction in the main street, including a large general store for JA Marshall and Company near the post and telegraph offices. Murphie successfully tendered for additions to the Post and Telegraph offices in December 1885. Profits generated in Burns Philp's Normanton store in the 1884–5 and 1885–6 financial years were greater than that of Townsville. The Gulf stores of Normanton, Burketown and Thursday Island, were together far more profitable than the stores in the major towns of Townsville, Cairns and Charters Towers which at that time were managed by Philp. He was elected to Parliament in 1886 as the member for Musgrave, and from 1888 represented Townsville.

The discovery of gold at Croydon in 1885, soon led to further growth in Normanton, as it became the supply base for miners. At that time the government was proposing to build a railway linking the Cloncurry copper mines and Normanton. By the end of 1886, the population at Croydon had reached 2,000, so the decision was made to divert the railway construction to Croydon utilising the materials that had been already delivered to Normanton. Tenders were called in July 1887, and the Normanton to Croydon railway line to Croydon completed in July 1891 (now known as the Gulflander). The rail line featured innovative steel sleepers, designed by George Phillips. Burns Philp was the shipping agent for the steel sleepers, manufactured in Glasgow and transported to Normanton. The growth of the Croydon goldfield provided wealth for Burns Philp during the somewhat brief time it operated.

Competition in local shipping activities led Burns Philp to form the Australian United Steam Navigation Company in 1887, which evolved from the Australasian Steam Navigation Company. It was in financial difficulties, because of fierce competition from the largely Burns Philp-owned Queensland Steam Shipping Company. To further shore-up the company's business interests in the Gulf, Burns engineered the pooling of three companies' resources which supplied lighter services to Burketown and Normanton in 1888. These included boats operated by Burns Philp, the Australian United Steam Navigation Company and lighters owned by Captain P Robinson. Lighters were needed because the bar of the Norman River had continually silted up, making it inaccessible to larger vessels. The new company, the Carpentaria Lighterage Company was registered in Brisbane in December 1900. Burns Philp also had a shipping agreement with Howard Smith and Sons Ltd for the operation of a Queensland service, terminating in Normanton, commencing on 1 January 1891, with Burns Philp holding dual agencies at the far northern ports. The lease for the municipal wharf at Normanton which had been held by Theodore Amsden was transferred to Burns Philp in April 1891. Burns Philp became known as the "octopus of the North" because of its extensive business interests.

From late 1889 until about 1895, there was a depression in Queensland. North Queensland suffered especially, due to a significant downturn in sugar production, and a drought, which peaked in 1889. This had a severe impact on the regional mining industry because the crushing mills needed water. Charters Towers and Croydon were affected and this had a flow-on effect for Burns Philp. Robert Philp had speculated on mining and real estate and had to sell his company shares and resign from the Board in 1893. It suffered a substantial decline in profitability, which in 1893 James Burns blamed on "insane overstocking of Normanton five years ago" with mining supplies. This included 300 pairs of bellows which are used in the dry-processing of gold. Despite the downturn, approval was given for the addition of a strongroom to the Normanton building, in late 1892. In January 1893 Burns Philp wrote to the Normanton Municipal Council requesting kerb and gutter be installed adjoining their store on Landsborough and Caroline Streets. The tender of £24 from local contractors Copeland and Cant for stone and concrete kerbing was accepted in February. It was installed ten feet past the side entrance to the Burns Philp store in Landsborough Street and to the end of the veranda in Caroline Street. The Council then requested the installation of spouting and gutters on the Burns Philp store. The cast iron gutter coves on the kerb were not tendered for at this time, and presumably were added later, reportedly manufactured at the Croydon foundry, operated by Messer's Stuart and Mackenzie between 1891 and 1912.

The fading fortunes of the Croydon gold mines in the early twentieth century had significant impact on the economy of Normanton, as did the construction of a railway between Townsville and the copper mines of Cloncurry in 1908. This settlement had been previously served by Normanton, and despite the best efforts of a former Burns Philp Normanton manager, and now Member of Parliament, James Forsyth, to build the Cloncurry to Normanton railway, it did not proceed. By 1920 the Carpentaria Lighterage Company withdrew from the Gulf trade and two lighters, the Atlas and Hercules were sold to the Shire Councils of Normanton and Burketown. The Lighterage Company was liquidated in 1926.

Burns Philp as a company had expanded its interests and its ports of call. By 1914, apart from the Sydney and London offices, there were 23 branches; 13 in Australia, three in the Solomon Islands, two in Papua, two in Java and one each in the New Hebrides, Tonga, Samoa and New Zealand. There were also sub-branches in Fiji and the Gilbert Islands, as well as a pearling fleet in the Torres Strait. Between 1890 and 1910 all the company's existing timber and iron buildings were replaced, with the exception of Normanton. The only extant buildings from this rebuilding exercise in Queensland are the Charters Towers store, built in 1891 and later incorporated into the adjoining store, now known as Bartlam's Store (Bartlam's Store) and the 1895 Burns Philp Building in Townsville. The only other known Burns Philp building remaining in Australia is the Sydney office in Bridge Street, built between 1899 and 1900. Burns Philp chroniclers Buckley and Klugman described the unaltered Normanton store as: "fossilised in a stagnant community...an example of an old kind of structure supplying a wide range of goods to a motley collection of isolated people" no longer typical of Burns Philp's operations in Australia by 1914; but the company still ran such stores at overseas branches.

Despite this critique, the manager of the Normanton store was able to increase the profits during 1914–15, by marking-up the prices of existing stocks in anticipation of wartime shortages. However, by 1923–24, the Normanton branch recorded a loss of over £2,000. During the 1930s, Burns Philp interests included copra plantations in Java and New Guinea, goldmining in New Guinea, and the establishment of retail stores, including the Penneys chain across Queensland and northern New South Wales (taken over by Coles in the post-war era). Despite the Depression, profits were still realised.

While passenger services had always been part of the company's business as a means of supporting the cargo trade, James Burns realised the tourism potential of the South Pacific while he was in Java securing the importation of copra in 1908. The Burns Philp Tour and Travel Department was established soon after, and the company published the Picturesque Travel magazine from 1911 promoting travel destinations worldwide.Burns Philp had a monopoly on shipping passenger services in Melanesia prior to World War I. By the mid-1920s, Burns Philp World Tour and Travel Department became agents for Qantas. The Winton-based company which had formed in 1920 established a mail route from Charleville to Cloncurry in 1925, which was extended to Camooweal in 1925 and to Normanton by 1927. The inaugural run to Normanton was piloted by one of the company founders Hudson Fysh. The first paying passengers on the mail run arrived in Normanton on 17 April 1929 after a fifty-one hour flight over three days. Burns Philp travel manager Mr Harman promoted the town as a sportsman's paradise, rich in wild fowl and alligators, fifty pound barramundi, groper, diamond fish and swordfish, with well priced accommodation available at the local hotels. Air transport became an integral part of business in the Gulf, even improving the local fishing industry, allowing fish caught at Normanton in the morning, to be sold at Longreach the same evening. By 1930, winter trips to Normanton were being promoted by Burns Philp travel office in Brisbane.

By the late 1940s the population of Normanton had declined to 234. The development of the prawn fishing industry at Karumba during the 1950s led to its population increasing into the 1970s, as it became the centre of the Gulf fishing industry. The prawn and barramundi fishing industries generated around $130 million in 2010. Tourism and amateur fishing are also major industries in the region.

Burns Philp and Company continued to expand and remained a blue-chip mainstay on the stock exchange throughout the 20th century, and by the 1980s it was an international empire of more than 200 companies involved in a range of industries from toy manufacture, perfume production, pharmaceuticals, car sales and the BBC hardware chain. It had been involved in insurance and banking, backing the formation of the North Queensland Insurance Company, which later grew into QBE.

Both Burns and Philp had served in the parliaments of Queensland and New South Wales. Robert Philp was Premier of Queensland between 1899 and 1903 and again from 1907 to 1908. He had entered parliament in 1886, managing various portfolios up until 1908 before moving to the back bench, and his retirement in 1915. He was knighted that year. James Burns, based in Sydney, was a Member of the NSW Legislative Assembly between July 1908 and August 1923. He was knighted in 1917.

Following the exit of the last family member from the management board in 1984, the new CEO began rationalising the smaller companies and consolidated the hardware and food ingredient businesses. It acquired Goodman Fielder in 2003, extending the company's operations across 30 countries. However, Burns Philp was deregistered on the stock exchange in December 2006 following a disastrous attempt at controlling the world yeast and spice market. Despite the folding of the company it was inducted into the inaugural Queensland Business Leaders Hall of Fame in September 2009.

The Normanton property was sold to the Delta Pastoral Company Pty Ltd in July 1983. It was further transferred to Normanton Mai Aboriginal Corporation in May 1985, when it was renamed Normanton Traders. It was again transferred in 1987 and 1999, but continued to operate as a general store. The Carpentaria Shire Council acquired the property in mid-2000.

The structure comprises three gabled sections, each divided by walls, running parallel to Caroline Street. Former employee Robyn Merrin, who worked in the store from 1978 to 1986, stated that the first section along Caroline Street was dedicated to sales, the second and third sections for the stocking of goods, with the back section devoted to produce such as hay, feed and molasses and some farm machinery. In October 2008, the section of the building along Caroline Street opened as a tourist information centre and library. The central section included some interpretation panels, and was used for storage. The northernmost section remains vacant and has been used for local social events. The concrete block toilet facilities at the rear of the building in Caroline Street and the additions to the strong room have been more recently constructed.

== Description ==
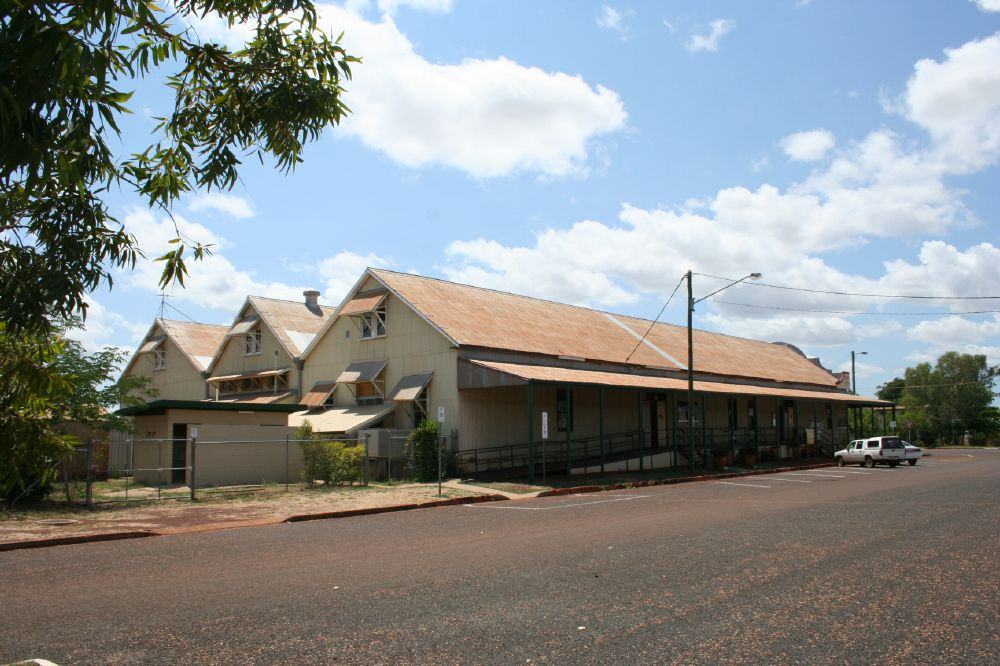
Side and rear view from Caroline Street, 2010

The former Burns Philp building, situated on the north-eastern edge of the town of Normanton at the corner of Landsborough (Burke Development Road) and Caroline Streets, is highly visible from the northern approach to the town and positioned in close proximity to the Norman River. The building aligns with both street frontages, occupying the southern corner of its large site, providing it with a generous open area to the north-east and river, where loading platforms are located.

The former Burns Philp building is a large timber-framed structure elevated on masonry and timber stumps and clad in vertically fixed corrugated iron sheeting. Behind a distinctive curved triple-fronted parapet facing south-east to Landsborough Street, the building is divided into three bays of varying width, each with a gabled roof and valley gutters running the length of the building. Two roof ventilators are positioned along the ridge of the middle bay. A timber-framed corrugated iron clad awning with ogee eaves gutter supported on posts (one early timber post survives) extends over each footpath. Two entrances are located on Caroline Street accessed by stairs and a connecting ramp. The kerbing to both streets is made from local stone and cast iron gutter covers inscribed with the words "Normanton Municipal Council" span the channel between the asphalt concrete road surface and concrete path to the footpath.

On the south-eastern elevation to Landsborough Street, the decorative parapet is lined with flat metal sheeting with the words "BURNS PHILP & Co LTD" painted to follow the upper curves of the parapet above the words "GENERAL MERCHANTS, SHIPPING, FORWARDING AND COMMISSION AGENTS". Below the awning, the three bays are distinguished by different openings. The south-western bay (Bay 1), has two large curved arch windows with half round mullions and the southern window has the remnants of the words CADBURY'S COCOA painted on the upper sash. Security grills secure both windows. Between the windows, fixed glazing, with a pair of tall centre pivoting fanlights above, has replaced a pair of doors and has a recent security grill fixed over the lower section of the opening. The centre bay (Bay 2) has three double hung windows, with two light sashes, mesh head vents and security grills, separated by a four panel door with fanlight over. A recently installed steel-framed panel of steel mesh has been fixed over the door. Centred in the north-eastern bay (Bay 3) is a large ledged and braced sliding door. There is no apparent evidence of stairs, providing access to any of the doors along the Landsborough Street elevation, which are located approximately one metre above ground level.

The south-western elevation to Caroline Street comprises four double hung windows with two light sashes, mesh head vents and grills similar to those on the south-eastern elevation. Vertical louvred metal vents are located at floor level below each window. Two pairs of four panel doors with fanlights separate the windows and provide entry to the building.

On the triple gabled north-western elevation all openings are protected by timber framed corrugated clad awnings and each apex houses a pair of centre pivoting sashes: two light sashes to Bay 1 and four light sashes to Bays 2 and 3. Bay 1 comprises a central pair of doors with tall centre pivoting fanlights above, between two double hung windows, covered by an awning supported on steel posts which provides protection for the air conditioning units positioned against the wall. Bay 2 comprises a row of three pairs of centre pivoting sashes above a large awning supported on four timber posts. Under the awning, a single four panel door and three small windows to the toilets are separated by a pair of four panel doors (with centre pivoting fanlights over) accessed by a set of stairs. Bay 3 contains a large, central, sliding ledged and braced door with a braced and ledged door adjacent to the north.

Along the north-eastern elevation there are two large ledged and braced sliding doors, one opening onto a loading ramp and a double hung window with six-light sashes at the northern end.

The interior of each bay varies in finish and the use of a variety of early linings suggests second hand materials, perhaps from the earlier store, may have been used in Bays 1 and 2. Arched openings between the bays provide transverse access from the Caroline Street entrance doors in Bay 1 to the large sliding doors in Bay 3. The openings between Bays 1 and 2 are in-filled with later doors and fixed panels.

Bay 1 is currently used as a tourist information centre and library. The south-eastern wall of the information centre has exposed framing lined externally with wide chamferboards (behind the corrugated iron to the facade). The remaining walls are lined with flat sheeting except for a section of the north-east wall where the horizontal tongue and groove board lining has been left exposed. A ceiling of tongue and groove boards is fixed between the bottom chord of the trusses with a section of double beaded boarding over the entrance to the middle bay. The library walls and ceiling are lined with flat sheeting and the timber floor throughout is lined with carpet. There are two later offices in the library that are not of cultural significance, one in the western corner and one in the eastern corner which has a raised floor level.

Bay 2 has unfinished timber floors, unpainted timber wall linings except around the arched door openings, and king post trusses that have a painted finish. Small areas of acrylic roof sheeting provide natural light. Some early shelving survives at the south-eastern end along with unpainted vertical beaded tongue and groove boards. On the south-western wall (west of the door way from the information centre), a small section of wall is lined internally with horizontal beaded boards. The remainder of the south-western and north-eastern walls are lined on the outside only with horizontal beaded tongue and groove boards except for a section of chamferboard lining at the western end of the south-western wall. The north-western wall is lined with wide, unpainted, vertical beaded tongue and groove boards. Toilets and a kitchen area of more recent construction are located in the south- western corner of this bay and have no cultural significance.

Bay 3 is an open space with no fixtures. The king post trusses are unpainted and the timber floor has been lined with hardboard. The north-western, north-eastern and south-eastern walls are unlined and the horizontal beaded boarding to the south-western wall is unpainted.

In the grounds at the rear of the building behind Bay 3 is a detached rendered masonry strong room with a heavy metal door and a curved concrete roof clad in corrugated sheet metal surmounted by a roof ventilator. Later additions sheeted in asbestos cement planking and metal cladding with skillion roofs abut the north-western and north-eastern walls of the strong room. To the west of the strong room, a toilet block constructed of concrete blocks with skillion roof is located behind Bay 1. The additions to the strong room and the toilet block are not of cultural significance.

== Heritage listing ==
The former Burns Philp Building was listed on the Queensland Heritage Register on 14 October 2011 having satisfied the following criteria.

The place is important in demonstrating the evolution or pattern of Queensland's history.

Built in 1884, the Burns Philp Building in Normanton is important as the oldest surviving store of the company which dominated shipping and mercantile trading in Australia and the South Pacific from the late 19th century to the late 20th century. Its construction and success in generating a greater income for Burns Philp than the larger centre of Townsville in the mid-1880s, is indicative of Normanton's regional importance as the major port in the Gulf at that time, servicing the mining and grazing industries.

The place demonstrates rare, uncommon or endangered aspects of Queensland's cultural heritage.

The Normanton store of Burns Philp is a rare surviving example, and the oldest of the company's nineteenth century structures in Queensland which included those in Brisbane, Townsville, Cairns, Bowen, Charters Towers, Burketown, Cooktown and Thursday Island. This building was left untouched by a major rebuilding exercise undertaken by Burns Philp at all of its Australian mainland stores between 1890 and 1910, and therefore it operated continuously as a general mercantile store and agency office for more than 120 years. Only Charters Towers, built 1891 (Bartlam's Store) and Townsville built 1895 (Burns Philp Building, Townsville) remain.

The place is important in demonstrating the principal characteristics of a particular class of cultural places.

The Burns Philp Buildingis a rare example of an early store which provided goods and services to a diverse community for a period of more than 120 years. The building with its decorative parapet is intact and demonstrates its function through the layout of spaces, including the retention of interior shelving and its detached strong room, as well as through the loading access points at the sides and rear with door openings at truck bed height. Its location the main street's highest point, close to the former town wharves, was important to the success of the company's business both locally and within Queensland.

The place has a special association with the life or work of a particular person, group or organisation of importance in Queensland's history.

As the earliest surviving store of Burns Philp and Company, constructed shortly after its formation, the building has a special association with its founders, the pioneering businessmen Sir James Burns and Sir Robert Philp. The company became one of the largest mercantile providers in Australia and the South Pacific, known as the "Octopus of the North" by the 1890s, and during the 20th century was involved in shipping, travel, retail stores, car sales, hardware, pharmaceuticals, perfume manufacture and insurance.

Burns Philp and Company was inducted into the inaugural Queensland Business Leaders' Hall of Fame in September 2009, in recognition of its significant contribution into the economic success of Queensland and Australia.
