= MV Macdhui =

Passenger and cargo motor ship

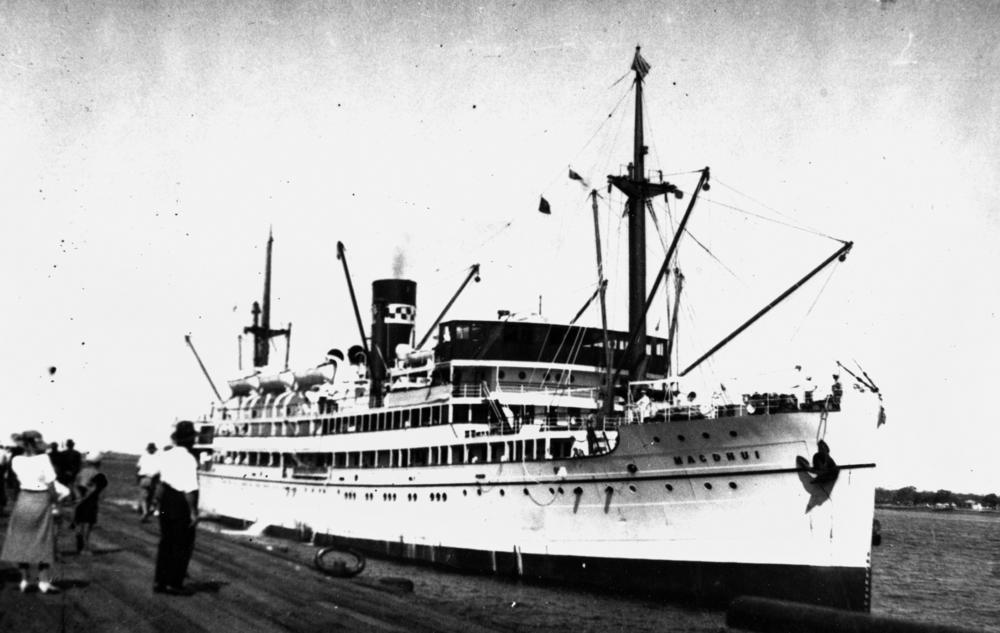
- Macdhui

History

Australia
- Name: Macdhui
- Owner: Burns, Philp & Co, Ltd
- Port of registry: Sydney
- Builder: Barclay Curle & Company, Whiteinch
- Yard number: 644
- Launched: 23 December 1930
- Completed: March 1931
- Identification: UK official number 157594; Code letters LGVM (until 1933); call sign VJNC (1934 onward)
- Fate: Bombed 17 & 18 June 1942, burned, total loss

General characteristics
- Type: Passenger and cargo ship
- Tonnage: 4,561 GRT, 2,626 NRT
- Length: 341.9 ft (104.2 m) registered
- Beam: 51.2 ft (15.6 m)
- Draught: 22 ft 0.75 in (6.7 m)
- Depth: 29.1 ft (8.9 m)
- Decks: 3
- Installed power: 653 NHP
- Propulsion: 8-cylinder 4-stroke diesel engine
- Speed: 15 knots (28 km/h)

MV Macdhui was a steel-hulled passenger and cargo motor ship built by Barclay Curle & Company at the Clydeholm Yard, Whiteinch, Scotland for Burns, Philp & Company, Limited, Sydney NSW, Australia. She was launched on 23 December 1930 and completed during March 1931. She operated with the company's Burns, Philp Line with service to Papua and New Guinea. She was sunk in 1942, as a result of damage suffered by being hit by bombs from Japanese aircraft, near Port Moresby.

== History ==
Macdhui was a three-deck ship registered at Sydney, UK official number 157594, 4,561 GRT, 2,626 NRT, with a registered length of 341.9 ft (104.2 m), beam of 51.2 ft (15.6 m), 22 ft 0.75 in (6.7 m) draught with an eight-cylinder diesel engine built by JG Kincaid & Co Ltd, Greenock. Her code letters were LGVM until 1933–34, when they were superseded by the call sign VJNC. On sea trials she attained a speed of 15 knots (28 km/h) and a wireless record establishing direct contact with Sydney from Scotland. Macdhui crossed the Atlantic and after a rough voyage transited the Panama Canal, acquiring a ship's cat for luck at Balboa, on the delivery voyage to Australia.

On 20 June 1937, a serious fire broke out in the ship's engine room in the early hours of the morning, putting her in danger. Passengers were ordered into the boats. By four in the morning the engine room fire was out, but damage was severe and the engines were disabled. The European passengers were taken back aboard with some 150 islanders as deck passengers, and were then put ashore at Fortification Point. A second, minor fire broke out in the number four hold, and was quickly put out. Responding to the distress call Neptuna, another of the company's ships, reached Macdhui the next day to tow the disabled ship to port.

In December 1941 with Japanese threatening islands to the north the Australian government decided to begin evacuating women and children from New Guinea, Papua, and Darwin. Macdhui along with Katoomba, Neptuna, and Zealandia took the evacuees to ports in Australia out of immediate danger. After Japanese landing on Rabaul some of the troops evacuated to Port Moresby were transported to Townsville aboard Macdhui in late April 1942.

After the initial bombing on 19 February 1942, Japanese air raids continued on Darwin during June, with a sixteenth raid on 13 June. Raids continued each night through to the 17 June, when Port Moresby had its 61st raid. Macdhui was hit, first amidships, then gutted, with three crew and one military working party member killed. The next day she was again hit and became a total loss.

In 2019, her hull was still visible off the village of Hanuabada.

== Bibliography ==
- Gill, G. Hermon (1957). Royal Australian Navy 1939–1942. Australia in the War of 1939–1945. Series 2 – Navy. Vol. 1. Canberra: Australian War Memorial. LCCN 58037940.
- Gill, G. Hermon (1968). Royal Australian Navy 1942–1945. Australia in the War of 1939–1945. Series 2 – Navy. Vol. 2. Canberra: Australian War Memorial. LCCN 76454854.
