= SS Matunga =

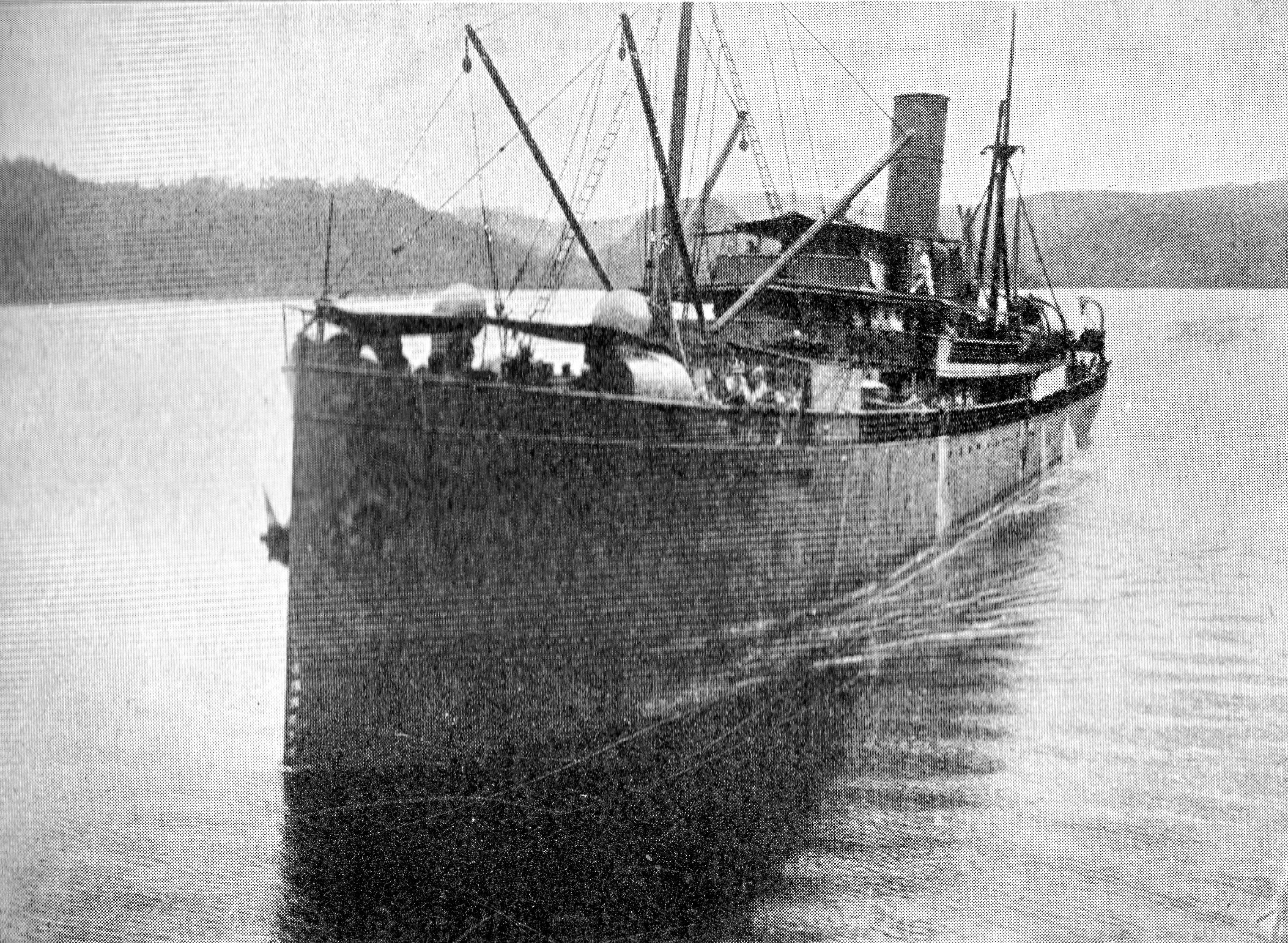
- SS Matunga in August 1917

History
- Name: SS Matunga
- Owner: Burns Philp & Co. Ltd
- Builder: Napier and Miller
- Launched: 27 April 1900
- Completed: May 1900
- Fate: Sunk 6 August 1917

General characteristics
- Type: Passenger cargo ship
- Tonnage: 1,618 GRT
- Length: 83.21 m (273 ft 0 in)
- Beam: 11.29 m (37 ft 0 in)
- Draught: 5.2 m (17 ft 1 in)
- Installed power: Steam-driven triple expansion engine
- Propulsion: Screw
- Speed: 10.5 knots (19.4 km/h; 12.1 mph)

SS Matunga was a 1,618-gross register ton passenger-cargo ship, built by Napier and Miller, Glasgow for Mersey Steamship Co., Liverpool and originally named Zweena. Purchased by Burns Philp & Co. Ltd in 1910 for the British Solomon Islands service. Burns Philp was operating seven plantations in the Solomon Islands through subsidiaries - the Solomon Islands Development Company, the Shortland Islands Plantation Ltd and Choiseul Plantations Ltd.

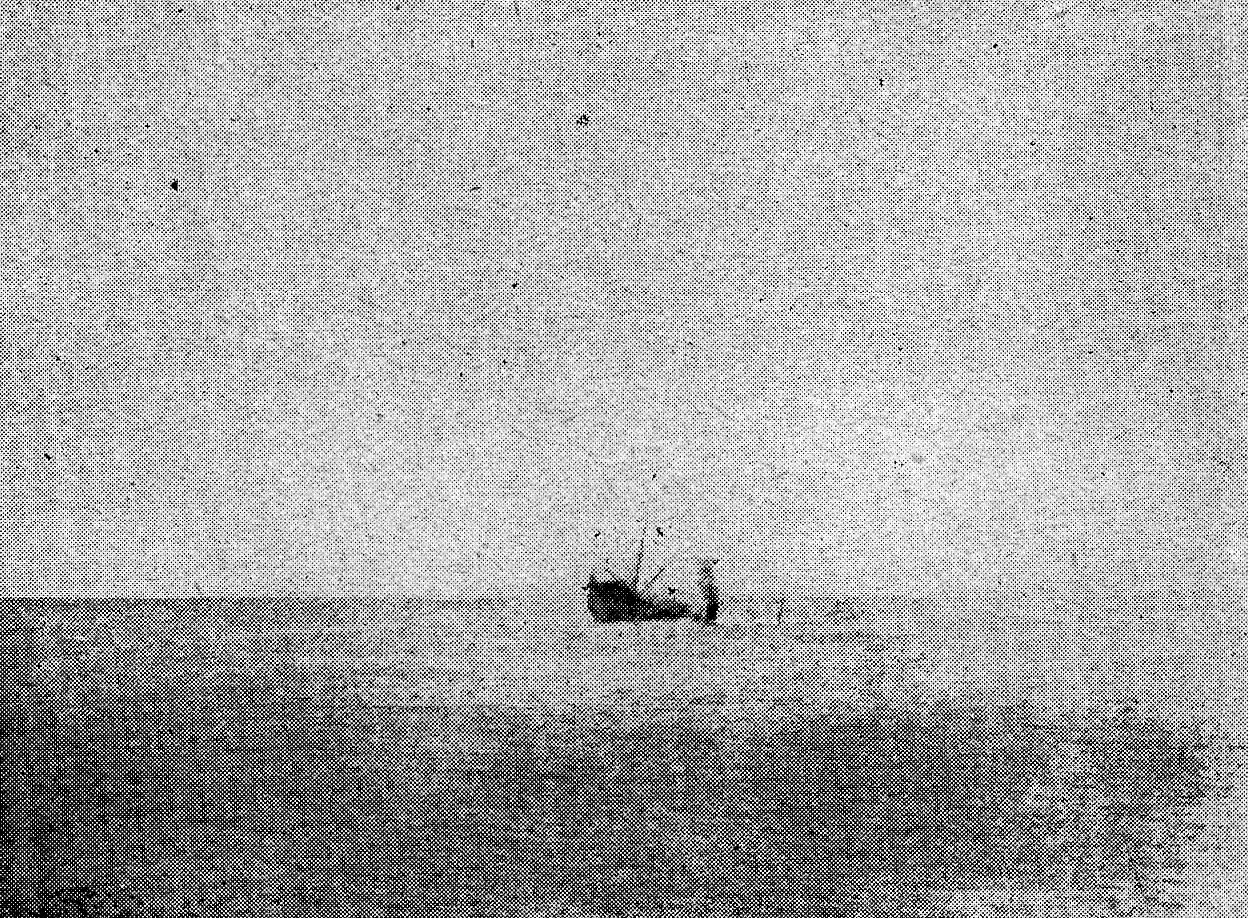
Der australische Dampfer MATUNGA sinkt am 26. August 1917 vor der Insel Waigeo nördlich Neuguineas

While en route from Sydney to Rabaul, on 6 August 1917 she was captured by the German raiding ship SMS Wolf. The coal was transferred to the Wolf, then time bombs were placed on the Matunga and she sank stern first near Waigeo Island.
