= MV Tulagi =

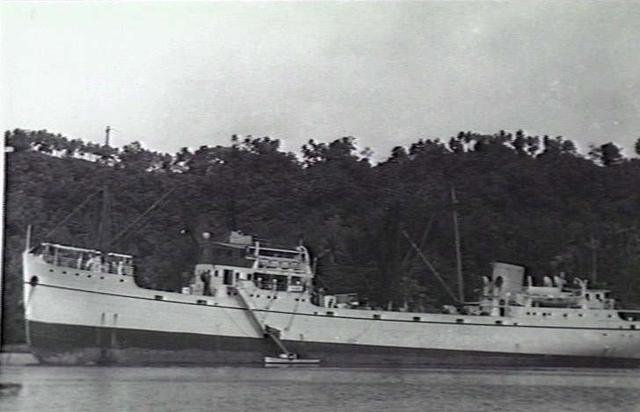
- Port side view of cargo ship MV Tulagi on 17 March 1940

History
- Name: MV Tulagi
- Owner: Burns Philp
- Port of registry: Hong Kong
- Builder: Hong Kong and Whampoa Dock, Kowloon, Hong Kong
- Yard number: 804
- Launched: 30 March 1939
- Completed: July 1939
- Out of service: 28 March 1944
- Identification: U.K. official number 172755
- Fate: Sunk on 28 March 1944 (Note: German reports say sunk on 27 March; Allied accounts say sunk at 0010 on 28 March.)

General characteristics
- Type: Cargo ship
- Tonnage: 2,281 GRT; 1,680 NRT; 2,550 LT DWT
- Length: 254 ft 6 in (77.57 m) (overall)
- Beam: 44 ft 2 in (13.46 m)
- Draught: 19 ft 6 in (5.94 m)
- Depth: 24 ft 10 in (7.57 m)
- Installed power: 2 × Hong Kong and Whampoa Dock built Harland and Wolff, Burmeister & Wain type; 396 NHP; 2,400 bhp (1,800 kW)(combined)
- Propulsion: 2 × screw propeller
- Speed: 12 knots (22 km/h) (service)

The MV Tulagi was a merchant ship built in 1939 and operated by the Burns Philp shipping line to carry cargo between the Pacific Islands and Australian ports. With the outbreak of World War II the Tulagi formed part of the Allied merchant navy fleet supplying the war effort throughout the Pacific and Indian Ocean theatres.

== Design and construction ==
Tulagi was a cargo ship built by Hong Kong and Whampoa Dock of Kowloon, Hong Kong (yard no. 804) for the shipping line Burns Philp. She was designed to carry produce from the Pacific to Mexico, a new enterprise for the company. She was launched on 30 March 1939 and was completed that July.

She measured 2,281 gross register tons (GRT), 2,550 long tons deadweight (DWT), 254 feet 6 inches (77.57 m) long (overall), and 44 feet 2 inches (13.46 m) abeam. Her draught was 19 feet 6 inches (5.94 m).

She was equipped with two 6-cylinder Harland and Wolff diesel engines of the Burmeister & Wain type, built under sublicense by Hong Kong and Whampoa Dock. These two-stroke cycle single acting engines had a combined power output of 2,400 bhp (1,800 kW) and drove twin screw propellers. The ship had a service speed of 12 knots (22 km/h).

== Early career ==
In the early part of the Second World War, the Tulagi had led a charmed life, surviving an intense Japanese air attack on the 16 February Allied convoy carrying reinforcements and supplies to Kupang (escorted by the heavy cruiser USS Houston, the destroyer USS Peary), and the surprise Japanese attack on Darwin on 19 February 1942.

== Sinking ==
The Tulagi's luck ran out in March 1944 while undertaking a voyage from Sydney to Colombo in Ceylon, carrying 1800 tons of flour and 380 bags of mail. In command was Captain Leonard Walter "Dusty" Millar, with a crew of 15 Australian officers, 26 Indian seaman, 7 Malay and 5 Royal Australian Navy Reservist (RANR) Gunners, making a total complement of 54 personnel.

On 28 March 1944 at 00:10, the Tulagi was located in the middle of the Indian Ocean, around 300 km south east of the Chagos Islands, when she was hit by two torpedoes fired by the German submarine U-532. This U-boat, under the command of Kapitän Ottoheinrich Junker, had been rendezvousing with two other submarines of the "Monsun" Submarine Group and the German supply ship Brake. The Tulagi sank in less than a minute, on her starboard side, stern first.

Fifteen men survived the sinking, eleven Australians, three Malays and one Indian. The survivors were divided between four rafts tied together by painters. On 7 April, one of the rafts was cast adrift and on 21 April, one of the three remaining rafts was broken up to make the remaining two rafts more comfortable for the 15 survivors. The survivors on the rafts were:

=== Raft 1 ===
J.R. Ward (Chief Engineer) D.G. Jacobs (Purser) R.T. Charles (2nd Officer) Ali Bin Sariwee (Malay Quartermaster) Note: Ali was from Jahore, Singapore Amos Helwend (Malay Quartermaster) Note: Amos was from Barbar Island in Indonesia Kalipan (Malay Quartermaster) Note: Kalipan was from Alor Island in Indonesia Basu Mian Abdul Bhooya (Indian greaser).

=== Raft 2 ===
E.J. Board (3rd Officer) G.L. Smedley (4th Engineer) J.D. Brown (Cadet Officer) H.R. Boyce (Petty Officer - RANR) D.K. Johnson (Able Seaman RANR) H.M. Morton (Able Seaman RANR) J.F. Murphy (Able Seaman RANR) C.H. Webber (Able Seaman RANR)

Food rations obtained from the raft supplies for the first 27 days comprised half a biscuit and 12 milk tablets per day per man, plus two squares of chocolate for the first six days. On 24 April, food rations were reduced to a quarter of a biscuit per day per man, and two days later the last of the rations were consumed, except for a small number of malted milk tablets. On 19 May, the two rafts became separated and drifted apart.

The raft carrying Board, Smedley, Brown and the five RANR personnel was not heard of again, but in the evening of 25 May, the other raft came ashore in Bijoutier Island in the Seychelles Group, 59 days after the Tulagi was sunk.

At the beginning of the drift, the total rations consisted of 45 biscuits, two tins of chocolate and six tins of malted milk tablets per raft. Water was not a problem in the early part of the voyage due to frequent heavy rain. In May however, it became scarce and was reduced at one stage to 3 oz per man per day. Rations were supplemented by an occasional fish caught by the Malays using an improvised spear made from a pair of scissors lashed to a raft stanchion. Fishing lines in the rafts were useless as the hooks had been stolen. In all 27 fish, along with two birds and one small turtle, were captured in this manner and eaten raw. However, there were long periods with no solid food - up to 10 days at one stage and nine days on another. All three Australian survivors stated that they owed their lives to untiring perseverance and unselfishness of the Malay seamen spearing fish, catching birds and capturing every drop of rain.

The seven survivors were rescued from Bijoutier Island on 26 May 1944, by Louis Gendron, a plantation supervisor from nearby Alphonse Island.

Estimated distance travelled: 1598 nm (approximately 2959 km) Average drift per day: 27.6 nm (approximately 51.1 km)
