= MV Merkur =

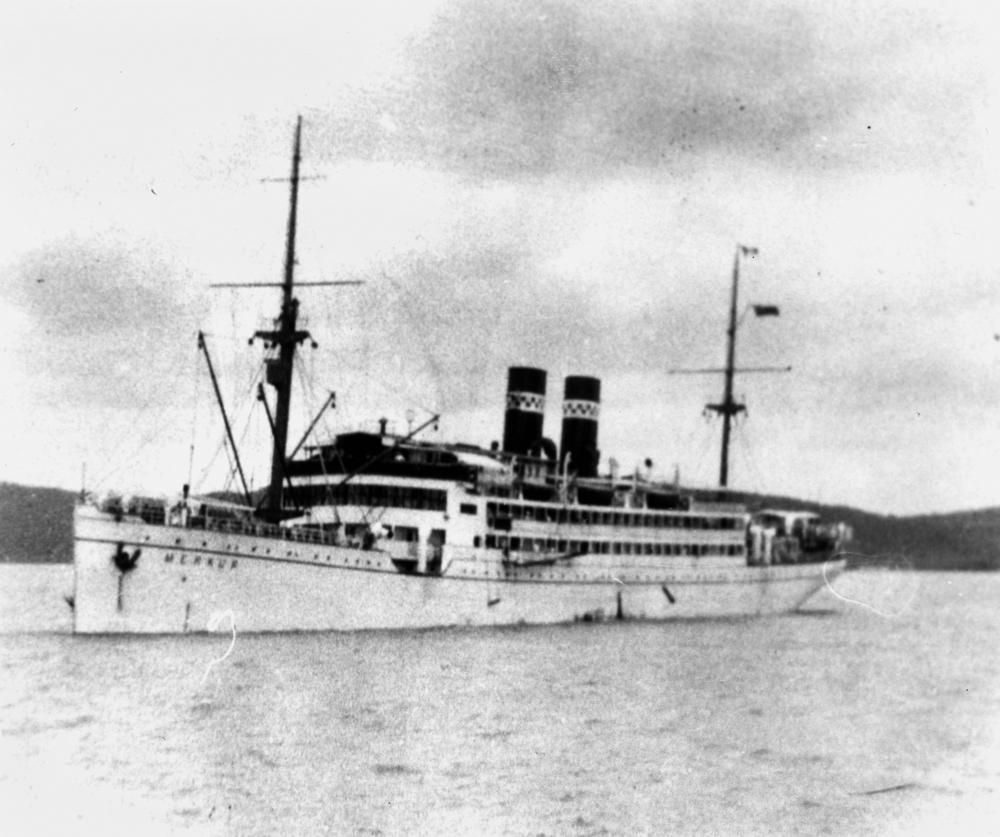
- Merkur

History
- Name: Rio Bravo (1924-1933); Merkur (1933-1954)
- Owner: Flensburg Steamship Company (1924-1933); North-German Lloyd (1933-1935); Burns Philp & Company (1935-1954)
- Builder: Frederick Krupp AG, Kiel
- Launched: 1924
- Fate: Sold to shipbreakers in 1954.

General characteristics
- Class & type: Motor vessel
- Length: 393.1 ft (119.8 m)
- Beam: 51.9 ft (15.8 m)
- Draught: 25.3 ft (7.7 m)

MV Merkur was a 5,952 tons passenger cargo vessel that was requitioned into the Royal Australian Navy (RAN) during the Second World War as a victualling stores and supply vessel.

Built by Frederick Krupp AG, Kiel in 1924 for Flensburg Steamship Company as Rio Bravo. She served the South American passenger/cargo service until the Flensburg Steamship Company went into bankruptcy. She was acquired by North-German Lloyd in 1933 and renamed Merkur, and was bought by Burns Philp & Company in 1935.

Merkur was requisitioned by the Royal Australian Navy on 12 December 1942 and operated in North Queensland and New Guinea waters with her civilian crew. She was returned to her owners in 1949.

== Fate ==
MV Mekur was broken up for scrap in January 1954 in Osaka, Japan.
