= Burns Philp =

Australian shell company and former shipping line

- Company type: Shell company
- Industry: Shipping
- Predecessor: Bast
- Founded: April 1883
- Founder: James Burns and Robert Philp
- Headquarters: Sydney, New South Wales, Australia
- Owner: Graeme Hart
- Parent: Rank Group

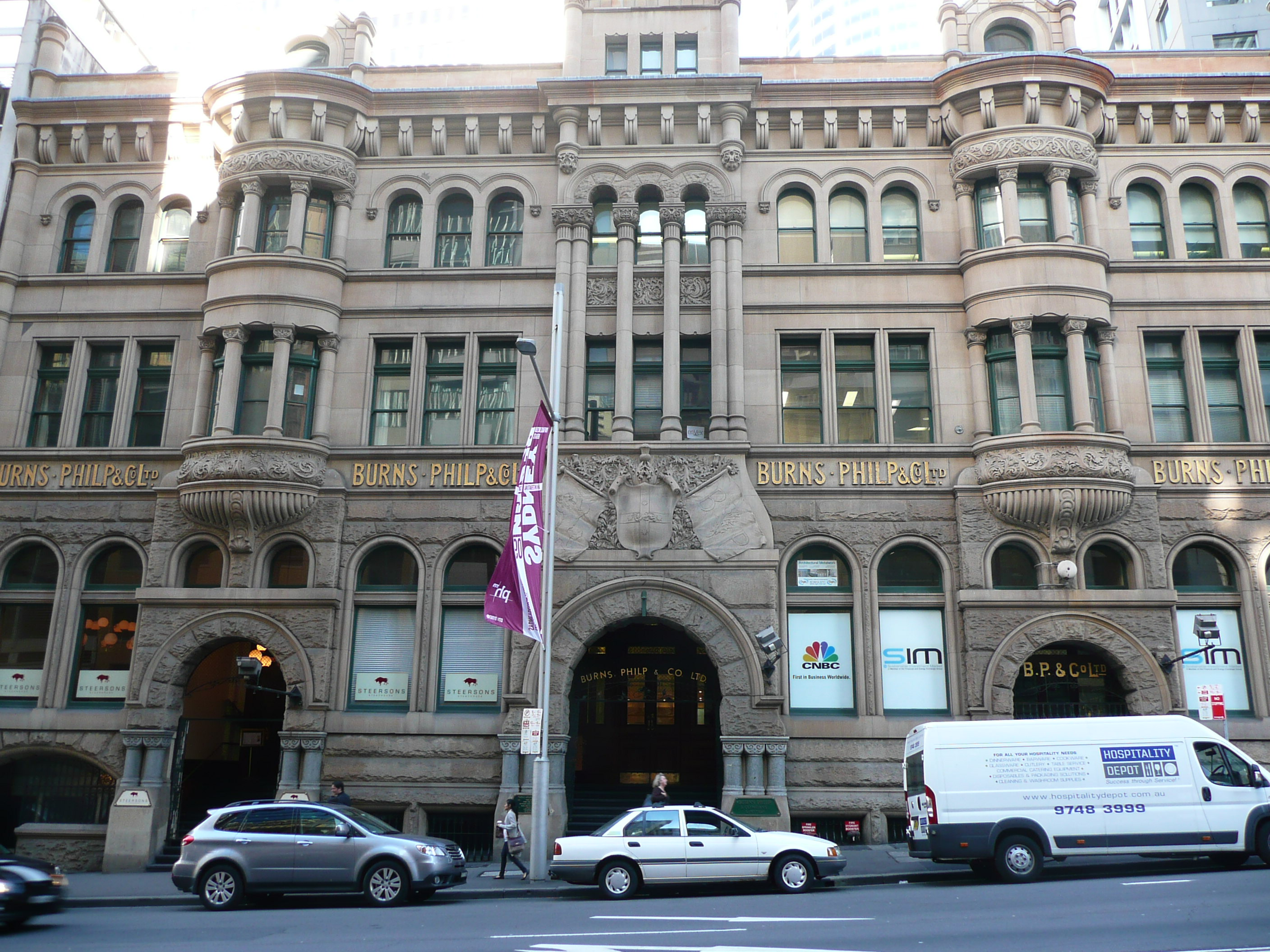
Burns Philp Building, Bridge Street, Sydney, built in 1901 to the design of Arthur Anderson of A.L. & G. McCredie & Anderson

Burns Philp (properly Burns, Philp & Co, Limited) was a major Australian shipping line and merchant that operated in the South Pacific. In later years the company was a major player in the food manufacturing business. Since its delisting from the Australian Securities Exchange in December 2006 and the subsequent sale of its assets, the company has mainly become a shell company. It is wholly owned by Graeme Hart's Rank Group (not to be confused with the British company of the same name).

== History ==
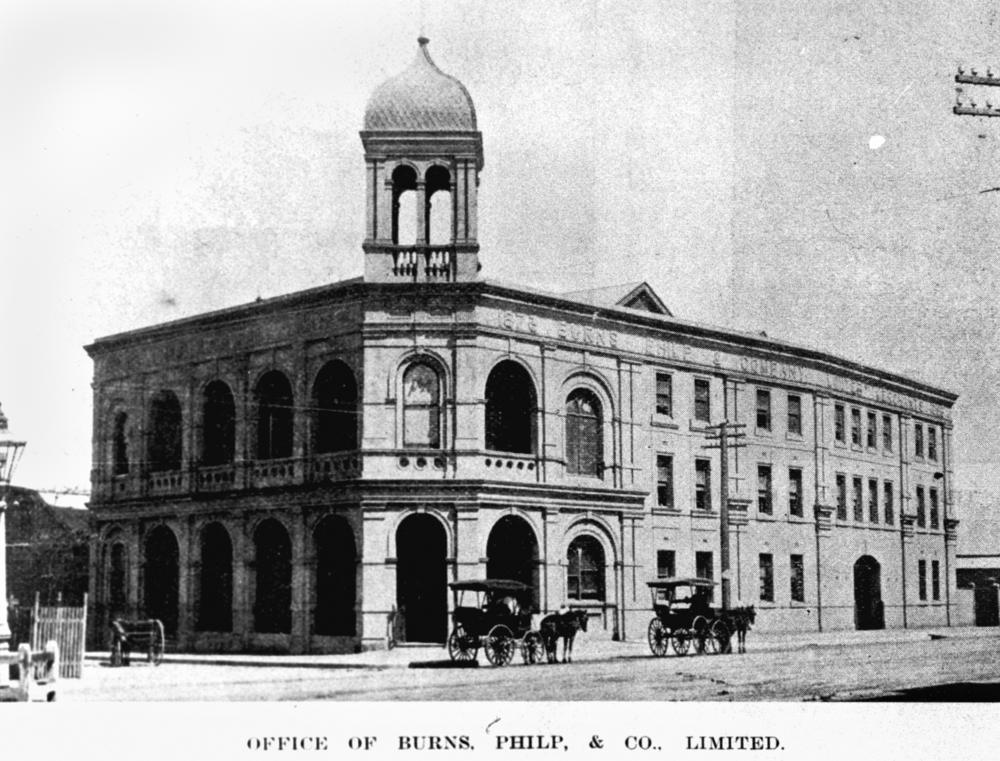
Burns Philp Building in Townsville, Queensland in 1901

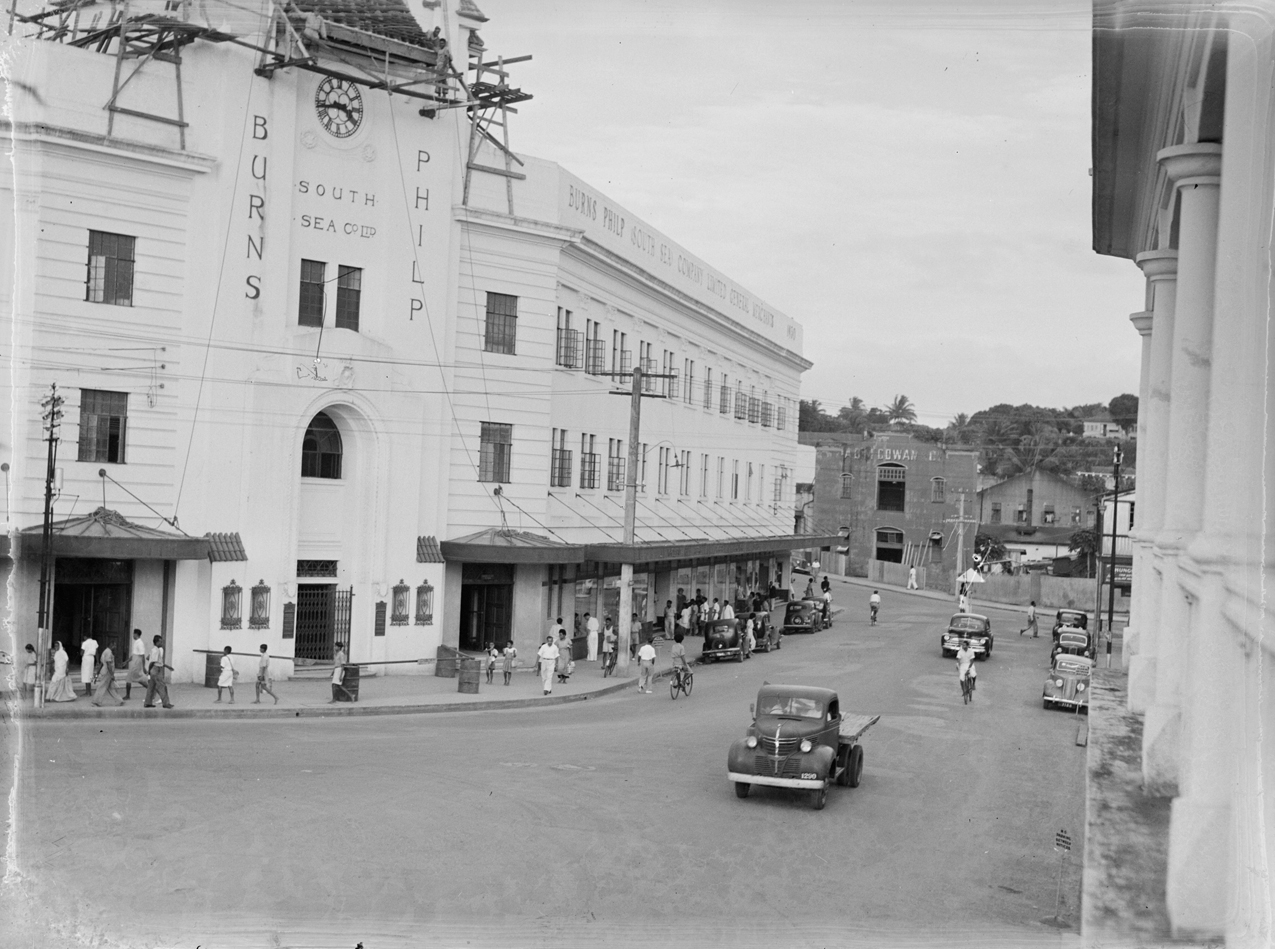
Burns Philp Building at Suva, Fiji Island

In April 1883 James Burns and Robert Philp began a trading partnership, originally named the "Burns, Philp & Company Limited". They were the first company to offer tourism to New Guinea, in 1884, advertising the 'New Guinea Excursion Trip'. This consisted of a five-week trip from Thursday Island and has been described as the "official beginning of tourist cruises in the South Pacific". The company later published a book titled Picturesque Travel, with the first issue appearing in 1911 and the last in 1925. Sir Robert Philp twice became Premier of Queensland, while Sir James Burns, became a member of the Legislative Council of New South Wales and founder/benefactor of Burnside Presbyterian Homes for Children.

Up to 1903, Burns Philp operated as merchants and shipping agents in the Pacific Islands, as well as providing a mail service and carrying tourists to Papua New Guinea, New Hebrides and the British Solomon Islands. In 1904, Burns Philp began to acquire plantations and land to develop into plantations in the British Solomon Islands.

In 1914 the Burns Philp Tourist Department was established, advertising tours on Lord Howe Island and Norfolk Island. Acquisition of the Port Moresby Hotel occurred in the same year, with the Papua Hotel purchased some years later. Burns Philp "maintained a near monopoly on passenger services to Melanesia until the outbreak of the war in the Pacific". During this period the company had a dominant role in trade in the region distributing general merchandise and collecting copra.

By 1916, Burns Philp was operating 7 plantations in the British Solomon Islands through subsidiaries - the Solomon Islands Development Company, the Shortland Islands Plantation Ltd and Choiseul Plantations Ltd.

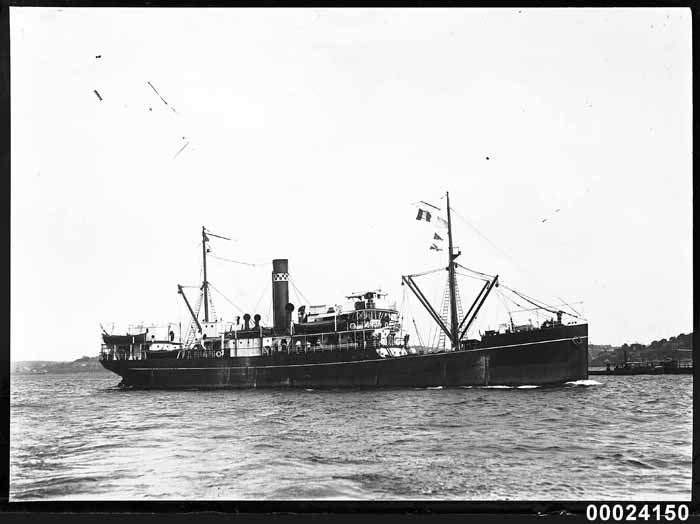
SS Makambo

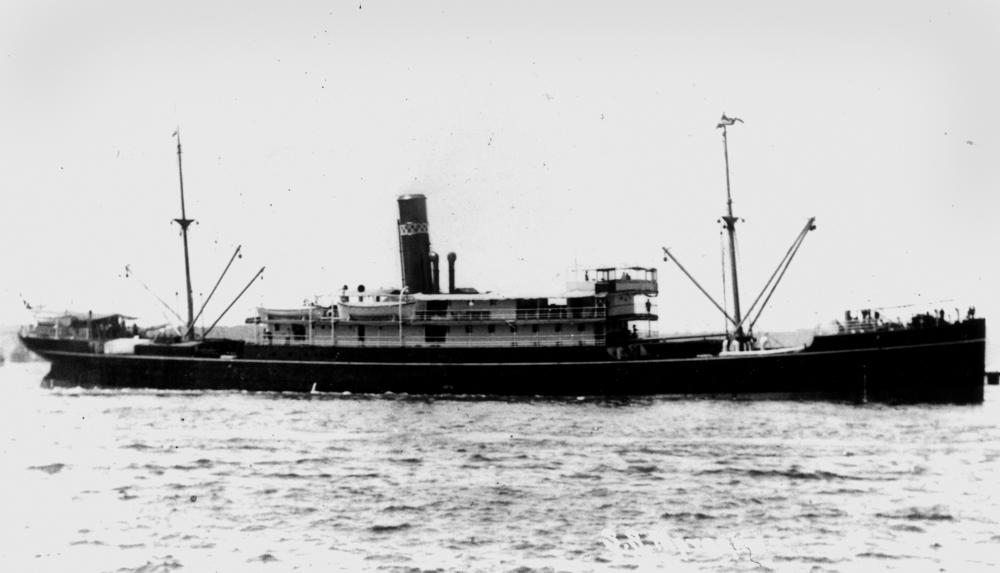
SS Mataram

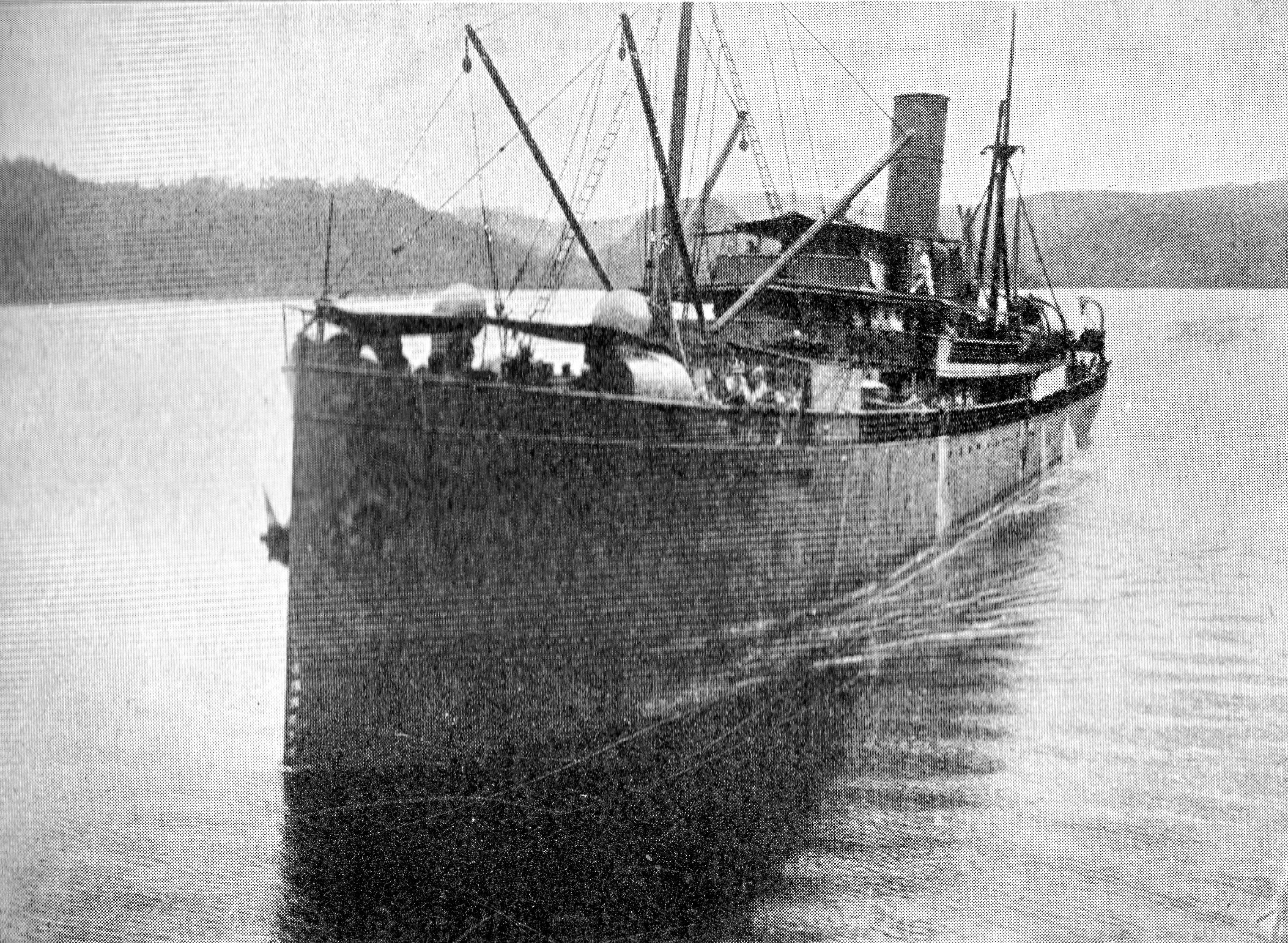
SS Matunga

== The Burns Philp fleet ==
The ships owned and operated by Burns Philp included:

- SS Titus was a 789 gross tons steam ship, built in 1878 by Alexander Stephen & Sons, and purchased by Burns Philp in 1896. She sailed to destinations in the South Pacific including the Solomon Islands, Papua, New Guinea and the Gilbert and Ellice Islands. Laid up 1908.
- SS Makambo was a 1,159 gross tons passenger-cargo ship built for Burns Philp in 1907 by the Clyde Shipbuilding & Engineering Co., Greenock Scotland. Transferred to Burns Philp (South Seas) Ltd in 1933 and registered in Suva, Fiji. Sold in 1935.
- SS Mataram was a 3,331 gross tons passenger-cargo ship built for Burns Philp in 1909 by the Clyde Shipbuilding. Engaged in the Sydney, Java and Singapore service; then the New Guinea service, and finally the Solomon Islands service. Sold in 1935.
- SS Matunga was a 1,618 gross tons passenger-cargo ship, built by Napier and Miller, Glasgow and originally named Zweena. Purchased by Burns Philp in 1910 for the Solomon Islands service. On 6 August 1917, while en route from Sydney to Rabaul, she was captured by the German raiding ship Wolf, then sunk.
- SS Montoro was a 4,507 gross tons passenger-cargo ship, built in 1911 by Clyde Shipbuilding. Operated the Australia, Java and Singapore service until the mid-1920s; then the Australia to Papua, New Guinea and Darwin service. Requisitioned for war service 1939 to 1945. She remained under charter to the Australian Government from 1945 to 1948. Sold for breaking up in 1948.
- SS Morinda was a 1,971 gross tons passenger-cargo ship built in 1913 by the Grangemouth Dockyard Company. Operated between Australia, Papua, New Guinea, the Solomon Islands, the New Hebrides (now Vanuatu), Lord Howe and Norfolk Islands. Requisitioned for war service in December 1941. After 1945 she returned to the Australia, Papua, New Guinea and the Solomon Islands service until she was sold for breaking up in 1952.
- SS Marella was a 7,475 gross tons passenger-cargo vessel, built in 1914, she was a German steamer handed over as to the British Government as World War I reparations. She was purchased by Burns Philp and renamed Marella in 1921. Operated on the Australia to Singapore service. Requisitioned for war service 1939 to 1945, then she returned to the Australia to Singapore service until 1949, when she was sold and was broken up in 1954.
- SS Mangola was a 3,350 gross tons passenger-cargo ship, built in 1920 by the Commonwealth Naval Dockyard, Sydney, and originally named Eudunda. She was purchased by Burns Philp and renamed Mangola in 1926. Operated on South East Asia and South Pacific routes, including Singapore, the Straits Settlements (now Malaysia), Burma (now Myanmar), Nauru, Papua, New Guinea and Darwin. Requisitioned for war service 1941 to 1945. She was returned to the Australia to Singapore service. In 1949 she was transferred to the Australia to Papua and New Guinea service. She was sold in 1957 and broken up in 1964.
- MV Merkur was a 5,952 gross tons passenger-cargo vessel, built in 1924. Sister ship to MV Neptuna. Purchased by Burns Philp in 1935. Operated on the Australia to Singapore service. Requisitioned for war service 1941 to 1945. From 1946 she remained under charter to the Australian Government. She was returned to Burns Philp in 1949, and was sold for breaking up in 1953.
- MV Neptuna was a 5,952 gross tons passenger-cargo vessel, built in 1925. Sister ship to MV Merkur. Purchased by Burns Philp in 1935. Operated on the Australia, Papua, New Guinea, Philippines, Hong Kong and Saigon service. Requisitioned for war service in 1941. She was sunk in Darwin Harbour on 12 February 1942 during a Japanese air raid.
- MV Malebar was a 4,512 gross tons passenger-cargo vessel, built in 1925 by Barclay Curle & Co. Operated the Melbourne, Sydney, Java and Singapore service. Wrecked on 2 April 1931 in fog at Miranda Point near Sydney.

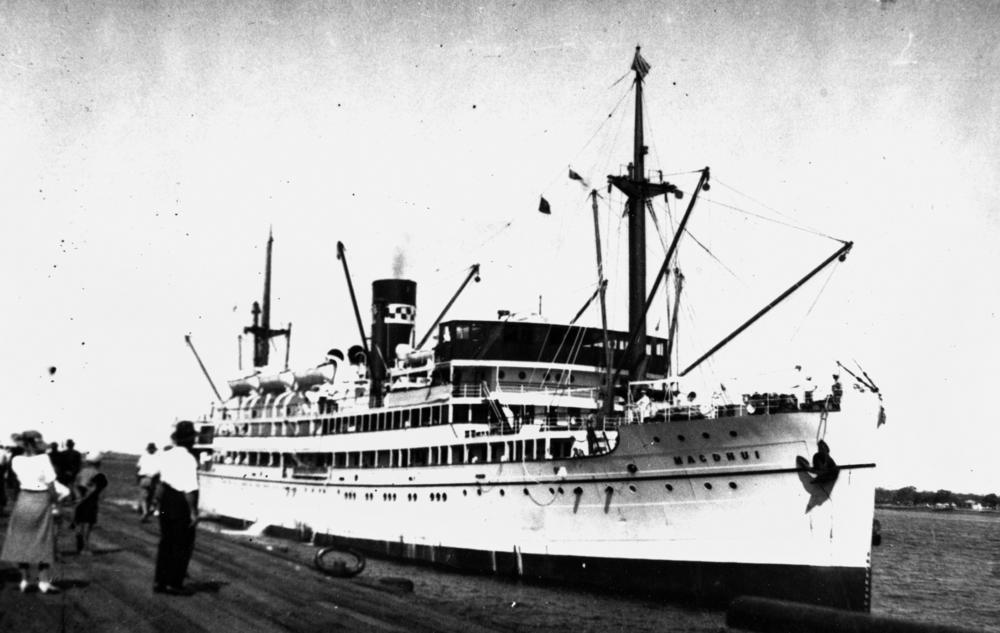
MV Macdhui

- MV Macdhui was a 4,561 gross tons passenger-cargo vessel, built in 1930 by Barclay Curle & Co. Operated on the Australia to Papua and New Guinea service. Sunk on 17 June 1942 during a Japanese air raid on Port Moresby.
- MV Malaita was a 3,310 gross tons passenger-cargo vessel, build in 1933 by Barclay Curle & Co. Operated on the Australia to the Solomon Islands service and was involved in the evacuation of women and children following the outbreak of war with the Japanese. Requisitioned for war service in 1941, Malaita survived a torpedo fired by the Japanese submarine Ro-33, near the Port Moresby Harbour entrance on 23 August 1942. Sold in 1965.
- MV Bulolo was a 6,267 gross tons passenger-cargo vessel, built in 1938 by Barclay Curle & Co. In addition to carrying cargo, she operated the mail service between Australia, Papua, New Guinea, Solomon Islands, New Hebrides, Norfolk and Lord Howe Islands. Requisitioned for war service (1939–46). After a refit, she resumed her cargo and mail service in 1948. Scuttled on 29 March 1951, to extinguish a fire in her cargo of copra. Refloated and repaired in December that year and resumed service. She was sold for breaking up in 1968.
- MV Lakatoi was a 341 gross tons cargo vessel, built in Hong Kong in 1938 by the Hong Kong & Whampoa Dock Company. Operated on the Australia to Papua, New Guinea and Solomon Islands service and was involved in the evacuation of women and children following the outbreak of war with the Japanese. Requisitioned for war service in 1941. She operated as a United States Navy ship during the South Pacific Campaign, she capsized and sank in a storm in the vicinity of New Caledonia during 1943.
- MV Matafele was a 341 gross tons cargo vessel, built in Hong Kong in 1938 by the Hong Kong & Whampoa Dock Company. Operated on the Australia to Papua, New Guinea and Solomon Islands service. Requisitioned for war service in 1941, she is believed to have been sunk by a Japanese submarine in the Coral Sea in July 1944.
- MV Mamutu was a 300 gross tons cargo vessel, built in Hong Kong in 1938 by the Hong Kong & Whampoa Dock Company. Operated on the Australia to Papua, New Guinea and Solomon Islands service and was involved in the evacuation of women and children following the outbreak of war with the Japanese. Requisitioned for war service in 1941, she was torpedoed by a Japanese submarine in the Gulf of Papua on 7 August 1942.

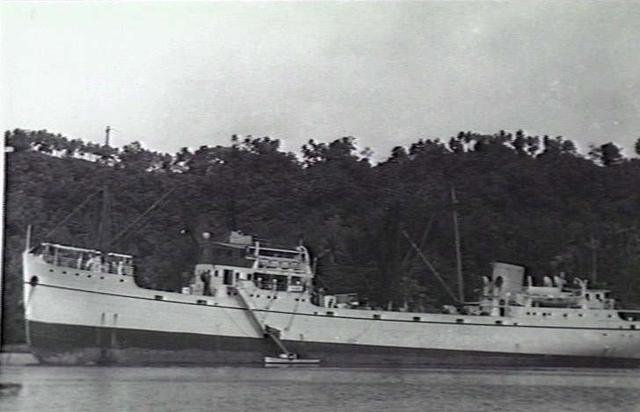
MV Tulagi 1940

- MV Tulagi was a 2,281 gross tons cargo vessel, built in Hong Kong in 1939 by the Hong Kong and Whampoa Dock Co. Operated on the Australia to the Pacific Islands and the west coast ports of North America, then the Australia to Papua, New Guinea and Darwin service. Requisitioned for war service, she was torpedoed on 27 March 1944 in the Indian Ocean by the German submarine U-532.
- MV Muliama was a 689 gross tons cargo vessel, which could carry refrigerated cargo, built in Hong Kong in 1938 by the Hong Kong and Whampoa Dock Co. Operated on the Australia to Papua, New Guinea and Rabaul service. After the bombing of Darwin on 19 February 1942, she participated in the cargo shuttle service from Cairns and Thursday Island to Darwin. Returned to Burns Philp in 1945, she sailed to destinations in the South Pacific including Solomon Islands, Papua, New Guinea and the Gilbert Islands and Ellice Islands. She was sold in 1957.
- SS Burnside was a 5,659 gross tons passenger-cargo ship that was under construction by Barclay, Curle & Co at the outbreak of World War II. Requisitioned for war service by the British Ministry of War Transport in 1940. In 1946, Burns Philp gained control of the ship and she operated on the Australia to Singapore and Malaysia service. Sold in 1964.
- SS Braeside was a 5,659 gross tons passenger-cargo ship, built in 1949 by Barclay, Curle & Co. she operated on the Australia to Singapore service. Sold in 1970.

== Expansion of business ==
In the second half of the 20th century, Burns Philp became involved in the production and distribution of food ingredients and consumer branded food, beverage and related products. The Group operated internationally, with leading products and brands enjoying significant market shares in each of its principal markets. Its product ranges included packaged bread and other baked goods, snack foods, breakfast cereals, edible oils, and meal components.

In the 1970s the management expanded the business through acquisitions and by the early 1980s, Burns Philp was a conglomerate that controlled over 200 companies involved in about 100 separate industries. The diversification put financial strain on the company, as nearly all of the companies in the group were not profitable. Beginning in 1984, the management began to restructure the group to focus on retail hardware stores and food ingredients, and acquired yeast and fermentation related businesses, such as vinegar production, in Europe and the United States. It became the largest supplier of yeast and vinegar in the world. In the 1990s, Burns Philp expanded into the spices and seasonings sector and became the second largest supplier of spices and seasonings in the North American market. However, the competition with McCormick & Company developed into an intense price war, which damaged the profitability of the company. On 24 September 1997, Burns Philp announced a writedown of its herbs and spice assets from AUD$850m to AUD$150m, and started to sell the herbs and spices business in order to focus on its core yeast operation. Burns Philp sold the corporate headquarters in Bridge Street, Sydney.

One of the most significant subsidiaries of the business in terms of profit was Goodman Fielder, Australasia’s largest baker, which was floated in an IPO (initial public offering). In 2007 Burns, Philp sold its remaining 20% stake in Goodman Fielder for NZ$676 million.

== Change of control ==
Since 1997 New Zealand businessman Graeme Hart has had an interest in Burns, Philp. He has been on the Board of Directors since 1997 and Chairman since 2004.

In December 2006 Hart acquired the remaining 42% of Burns Philp he didn't already own and the company was delisted on 20 December 2006. After the sale of its yeast and spices business to UK firm Associated British Foods, Uncle Tobys to Nestlé for NZ$1.1bn, Bluebird Foods to PepsiCo for NZ$245 million, and its NZ$676 million 20% stake in Goodman Fielder the company became largely a shell. Burns Philp is wholly owned by Hart's private investment company Rank Group Limited.

== Heritage listings ==
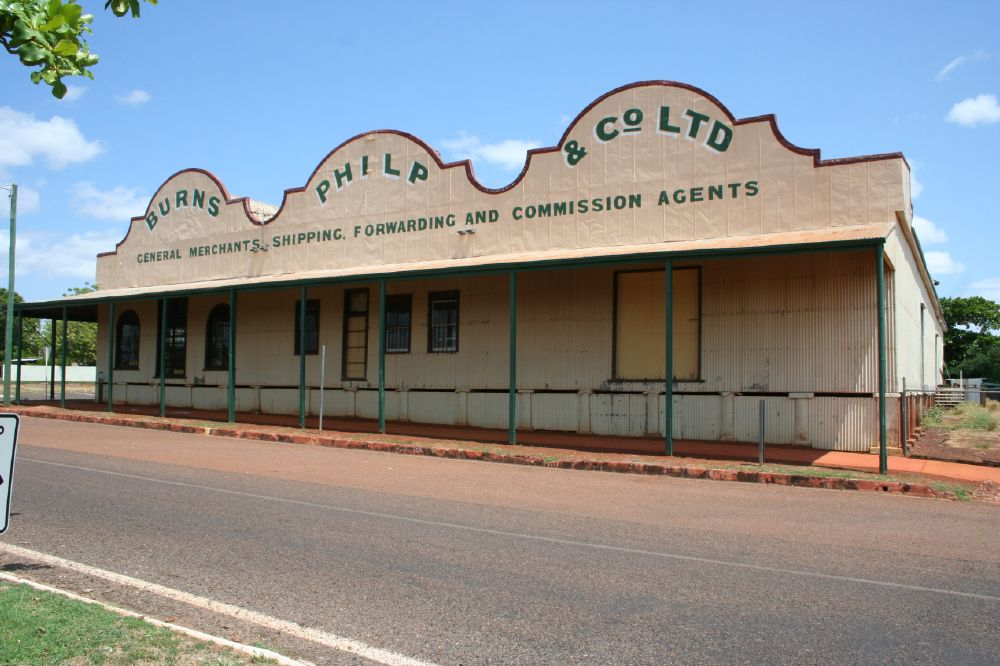
Former Burns Philp Building, Normanton, 2019

A number of building associated with Burns Philp are now heritage-listed:

- Burns Philp Building in Bridge Street, Sydney, listed on the New South Wales State Heritage Register
- Burns Philp Building in Normanton, Queensland, listed on the Queensland Heritage Register
- Burns Philp Building, in Townsville, Queensland, listed on the Queensland Heritage Register
- Burns Philp Building in Bowen, Queensland, listed on the Whitsunday Region Heritage Register.

== Awards ==
Burns Philp was inducted into the Queensland Business Leaders Hall of Fame in 2009, for significant contributions made to the development of Queensland and its economy.
