= Town of Normanton =

Local government area of Queensland, Australia

Coordinates: 17.672°S 141.078°E

The Town of Normanton is a former local government area for the town of Normanton in North Queensland, Australia. It existed from 1886 to 1910.

== History ==
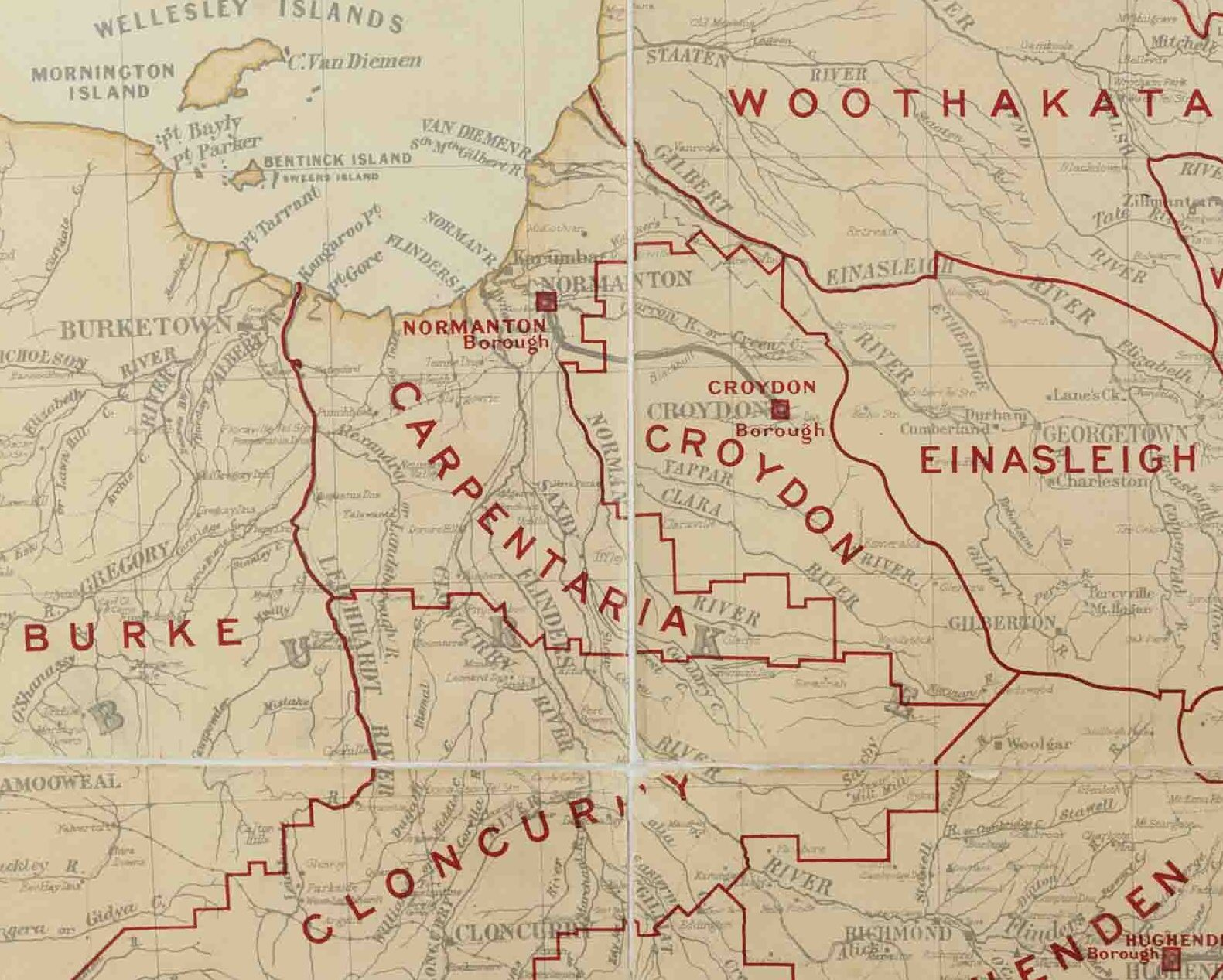
Map of Borough of Normanton and adjacent local government areas, March 1902

On 6 February 1886, the Borough of Normanton was constituted separately as a municipality for the emerging town of Normanton. Its first elections held on 13 April 1886.

With the passage of the Local Authorities Act 1902, the Borough of Hughenden became the Town of Hughenden on 31 March 1903.

On 8 January 1910, the Town of Normanton was abolished and absorbed into the Shire of Carpentaria.

== Mayors ==
- 1888: R. G. Shanklin
- 1889: Major Colless
- 1890: H.B. Raffety
- 1891: Mr. Valkenburg
- 1892: Mr. Hely
- 1893: Alderman Lawrence
- 1894: Mr. R. Robinson
- 1898, 1904: Mr. S. Mathers
- 1905, 1906, 1908: Mr. Rowland Robinson
- 1907: Mr. Mathers, proprietor of the Norman Chronicle
- 1909, 1910, 1911 : James Robert Butteris
