= Burns Philp Building, Townsville =

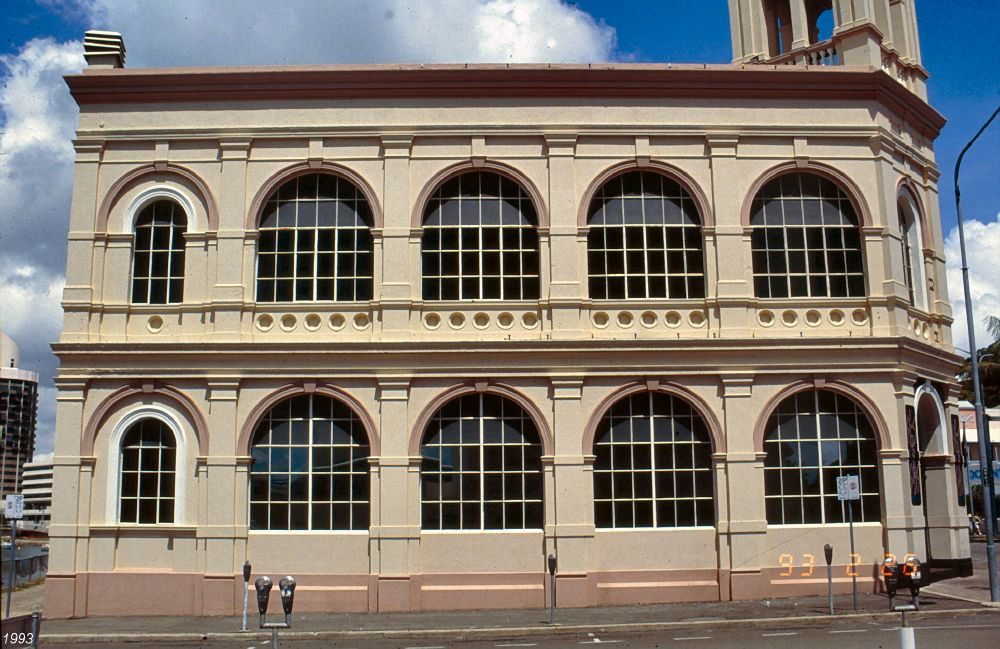
- The former Burns Philip & Company Ltd Building, 1993

- Location within Queensland Location within Australia
- 19.2574°S 146.8213°E
- Location: 108–124 Flinders Street, Townsville CBD, City of Townsville, Queensland, Australia

History
- Design period: 1870s–1890s (late 19th century)
- Built: 1895

Site notes
- Architect: McCredie Brothers

Queensland Heritage Register
- Official name: Burns, Philp & Company Ltd Building (former)
- Type: state heritage (built)
- Designated: 27 August 1993
- Reference no.: 600914
- Significant period: 1890s, 1920s (fabric); 1895–1977 (historical use by Burns Philps)
- Significant components: pavilion, tower – observation/lookout, loggia/s
- Builders: G S Gordon

Burns Philp Building is a heritage-listed office building at 108–124 Flinders Street, Townsville CBD, City of Townsville, Queensland, Australia. It was designed by McCredie Brothers and built in 1895 by G S Gordon. It was added to the Queensland Heritage Register on 27 August 1993.

== History ==
This large masonry building was erected in 1895 as the principal offices and warehouse for Burns, Philp & Company Ltd, one of North Queensland's most successful trading enterprises.

The firm was founded in Townsville in 1872, when James Burns established a general retail business in Flinders Street. Robert Philp (later Sir Robert, KCMG and twice Queensland Premier) acquired a share in the business in 1876. Due to ill health, Burns returned to Sydney in 1877, leaving Philp to manage the Townsville store.

In the late 1870s and early 1880s, Burns and Philp individually established trading networks in North Queensland, which were amalgamated as Burns, Philp & Company Ltd in 1883. By 1887 the company had disposed of their retail concerns, concentrating on the importation and wholesaling of general merchandise, and general shipping and insurance, with branches in London, Sydney, Brisbane, Cairns, Thursday Island, Normanton, Charters Towers, Cooktown and New Guinea. The firm was employing 300 persons, owned their own fleet of small trading vessels, and was pioneering trade, communications and exploration throughout North Queensland, New Guinea and the South Pacific. The company also had interests in North Queensland sugar, gold and pastoralism. Although Robert Philp was bankrupted in the 1890s and resigned his interests in the firm in 1893, the name of Burns, Philp & Company Ltd was retained.

In Townsville, Burns, Philp & Company Ltd had acquired approximately 200 metres (660 ft) of Ross Creek frontage, on which they erected wharves and warehouses, with their offices in an old building which had been erected in the 1860s for Robert Towns and John Melton Black, the founders of Townsville. By 1895, Burns, Philp & Company Ltd dominated trade in Townsville, and their importance to this town and to North Queensland in general was illustrated in the erection of substantial new premises.

The new building was designed by the company's Sydney architects McCredie Bros, who also designed Burns, Philp & Company Ltd's principal Sydney offices. It was erected in nine months by contractor GS Gordon, and was opened on 12 November 1895.

The two-storeyed section with frontages to Wickham and Flinders Streets housed the main offices: the shipping department on the ground floor and the manager's office and cashiers' and correspondence department on the upper floor. There was also a strong room and lavatory at each level. The three-storeyed section fronting Flinders Street was mainly warehousing, although the merchandise department, and behind this, the spirit room, were located on the ground floor adjacent to the shipping office, and accessed from this office via a door beneath the front staircase.

The building was designed for expansion. The walls, including the northwestern end wall of the warehouse, were constructed with bricked-in arches to facilitate later extensions. In 1903 the company planned a three-storeyed brick extension to the warehouse along Flinders Street; this scheme was not carried out, but in 1913–14 a long, single-storeyed, concrete warehouse extension was erected. This building has been demolished.

In 1922, the company's architect in Townsville, Walter Hunt, designed alterations to the offices and ground floor of the warehouse, extending the office area. These were carried out in three stages during 1922 and 1923. At this period, the arches separating the shipping and merchandising departments were exposed, and the large arched doorway from Flinders Street into the warehouse was bricked in, and three windows were placed in the bay.

At some later period the interior of the warehouse was gutted by fire, and the roof and floors were replaced.

Burns, Philp & Company Ltd retained the building until 1977. At this stage the two-storeyed section was converted into a night club, a doorway was cut in the second end bay of the former warehouse, and the latter was converted to office accommodation.

== Description ==
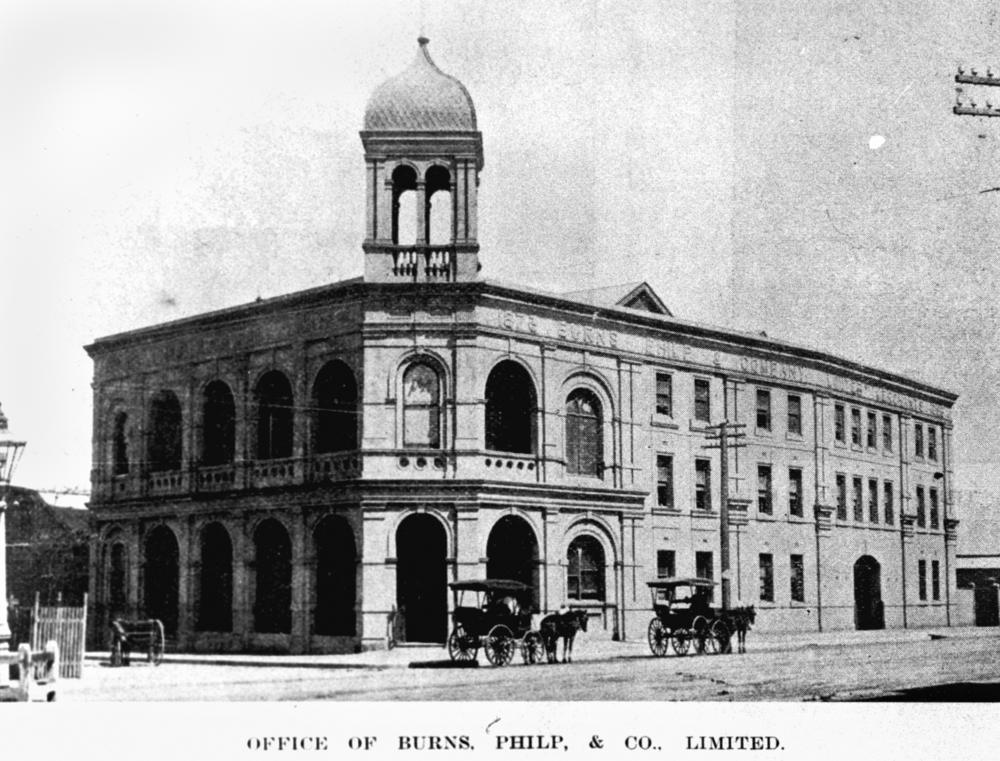
Burns Philp and Company building at Townsville in 1901

The former Burns, Philp and Company Ltd building, located on the southern corner of Flinders and Wickham Streets with Ross Creek at the rear, is a rendered masonry building consisting of a two-storeyed corner section with an adjoining three-storeyed section along Flinders Street.

The two-storeyed corner section consists of five arched bays along Wickham Street, a corner bay and two bays along Flinders Street. Each bay is separated by a pilaster, with a deep cornice between floors and at the roofline concealing a hipped corrugated iron roof. Originally an open arcade, the arched bays have been enclosed with metal framed glazing with an open corner entrance at the ground level. The corner is surmounted by a pavilion, consisting of paired arches, rendered balustrade and a rebuilt ogee shaped roof with diamond pattern metal tiles. The corner nightclub entrance below has a mosaic style tiled floor and steel gates.

The facade of the three-storeyed Flinders Street section, consists of four bays separated by paired pilasters with a deep cornice at the roofline concealing a curved corrugated iron roof, which is evident on the southwest end elevation. Each bay, except the second last bay, houses a pair of aluminium framed windows per floor. The other has four windows per floor, with the ground floor having been remodelled with an unbalanced single entry with two windows, and cantilevered awning. The rear of this section has aluminium framed windows.

Internally, the corner section has been refitted as a nightclub on both floors. The ground floor extends into the adjoining section through openings framed by paired columns supporting an entablature, part of which is missing, with a deep cornice and surmounted by false arched fanlights. Cast iron columns, located centrally, bear plaques with the date 1895. Most fixtures, fittings and finishes are recent, including the staircase, ceilings, air conditioning, rear kitchen and toilets.

The Flinders Street section has a central entry and staircase with office space to either side. Only the exterior walls remain from this section of the original building.

A plant room, constructed in 1978, is attached to the rear of the building, and contains a sub-station and switchboard on the ground floor, air-conditioning plant on the first floor and a cooling tower room on the second floor.

== Heritage listing ==
The former Burns Philp & Company building was listed on the Queensland Heritage Register on 27 August 1993 having satisfied the following criteria.

The place is important in demonstrating the evolution or pattern of Queensland's history.

The former Burns Philp & Company building, Townsville, erected in 1895, is important in demonstrating the evolution and pattern of Queensland's history, being evidence of the close association between Burns, Philp & Company Ltd and the development of Townsville as the principal town and port of North Queensland in the late 19th century.

The place demonstrates rare, uncommon or endangered aspects of Queensland's cultural heritage.

It demonstrates several rare aspects of Queensland's cultural heritage, being the only surviving 19th century warehouse/office complex along Ross Creek, and a surviving remnant of Burns, Philp & Company Ltd's former substantial Townsville complex which, in the 1890s, extended along 200 metres (660 ft) of Ross Creek, back to Flinders Street, and across Wickham Street, and included shipping and insurance offices, a passenger depot, wharves, warehouses and workshops.

The place is important in demonstrating the principal characteristics of a particular class of cultural places.

It is important in demonstrating the principal characteristics of a substantial commercial building in which the combined functions of offices and warehouse are reflected in the hierarchy of its classically derived architecture; and of the commercial work of Sydney architects McCredie Bros.

The place is important because of its aesthetic significance.

It is important in exhibiting a range of aesthetic characteristics valued by the Townsville community, in particular the strong streetscape and townscape contribution it makes as it addresses the intersection of Flinders and Wickham Streets; the quality of design of the building; and surviving interior elements.

The place has a strong or special association with a particular community or cultural group for social, cultural or spiritual reasons.

It has a strong and special association with the Townsville community as a local landmark and as a focus for community pride in Townsville's historical development as the principal port of North Queensland.

The place has a special association with the life or work of a particular person, group or organisation of importance in Queensland's history.

It has a special association with the important and successful Burns, Philp & Company, its origins in Townsville, and its substantial contribution to the development of North Queensland in the late 19th and early 20th centuries.
