= SS West Cajoot =

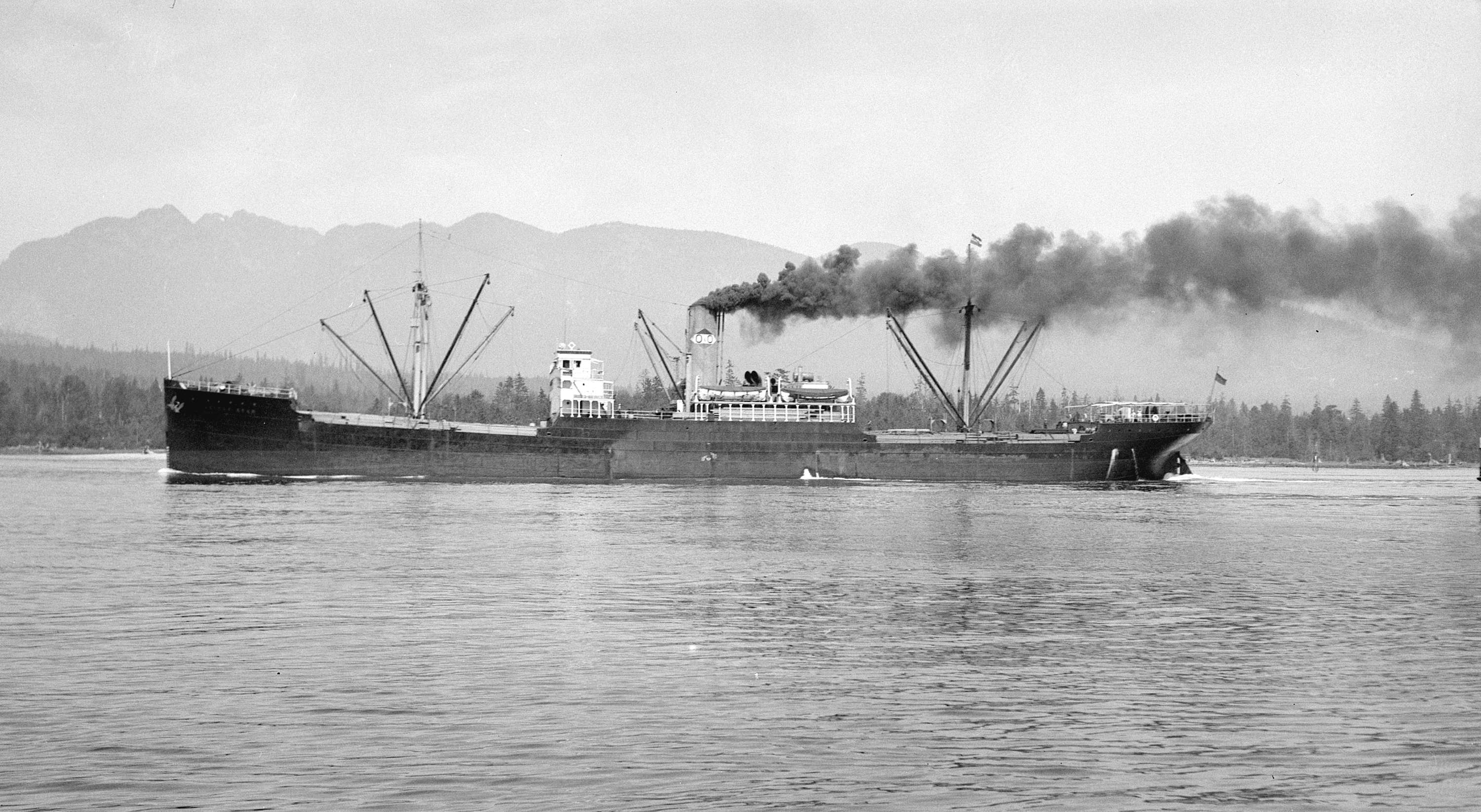
- SS Golden Bear (formerly West Cajoot) in Vancouver (1933). Photograph by Walter E. Frost

History

United States
- Name: West Cajoot (1919-1928); Golden Bear (1928-1937); Kailua (1937-1942); Viborg (1942-1947)
- Owner: USSB (1920-March 1928); Oceanic & Oriental Navigation Company (1928-1937); USSR Far East Shipping Corporation (December 1942-1947)
- Operator: Los Angeles Pacific Navigation Company (1919-1920); Cosmopolitan Steamship Company (1920-1921); Struthers & Barry (1923-August 1926); Swayne & Holt (August 1926-1928); Oceanic & Oriental Navigation Company (1928-1937); Matson Navigation Company (1938-1942)
- Builder: Los Angeles Shipbuilding & Dry Dock Co
- Yard number: 13
- Laid down: July 4, 1918
- Launched: November 3, 1918
- Christened: West Cajoot
- Commissioned: May 1, 1919
- Home port: Los Angeles (1920-1927); San Francisco (1927-1941); Vladivostok (1942-1947)
- Identification: US official number 217906; Call sign LQSR (1920–33); Call sign KEXX (1934–42)
- Fate: exploded and sank December 19, 1947

General characteristics
- Tonnage: 5,342 GRT; 3,339 NRT; deadweight 8,350
- Length: 410 ft 0 in (124.97 m)
- Beam: 54 ft 4 in (16.56 m)
- Depth: 27 ft 2 in (8.28 m)
- Installed power: 3500 Ihp, 422 Nhp
- Propulsion: Los Angeles Shipbuilding & Dry Dock Co 3-cylinder triple expansion
- Speed: 9.2 knots
- Crew: 40

West Cajoot was a Design 1013 cargo ship built in 1919 by the Los Angeles Shipbuilding & Dry Dock Co of Los Angeles. She was one of many ships built by the company for the United States Shipping Board.

== Design and construction ==
The West ships were cargo ships of similar size and design built by several shipyards on the West Coast of the United States for the United States Shipping Board (USSB) for emergency use during World War I. Most were given names that began with the word West. The ship was laid down at Los Angeles Shipbuilding & Dry Dock Co shipyard (yard number 13, USSB hull number 767), and launched on 3 November 1918. Due to her yard number being 13, she was launched as "12-A" to escape the sailors' hoodoo. She was named allegedly after a Native American woman, Cajoot, some relative of Pocahontas. As built, the ship was 410 feet 0 inches (124.97 m) long (between perpendiculars) and 54 feet 0 inches (16.46 m) abeam, a mean draft of 23 feet 11 1/4 inches (7.296 m). West Cajoot was assessed at 5,899 GRT, 3,711 NRT and 8,350 DWT. The vessel had a steel hull, and a single 422 nhp triple-expansion steam engine, with cylinders of 28 1/2, 47 1/4, and 78 inches diameter with a 48-inch (120 cm) stroke, that drove a single screw propeller, and moved the ship at up to 10.5 knots (12.1 mph; 19.4 km/h).

== Operational history ==
West Cajoot was launched on November 3, 1918, and delivered to the United States Shipping Board on May 1, 1919. Upon delivery, she became the first vessel allocated to Los Angeles Pacific Navigation Company.

=== Los Angeles Pacific Navigation Company (1919-1920) ===
On May 16, 1919, she left Los Angeles loaded full for the Orient with a general cargo consisting among other things of steel rails, automobile supplies, roofing paper, and old newspapers. After touching off at Honolulu on May 26, she arrived in Manila on July 1., then proceeded to Hong Kong arriving there on August 17, and finally returned to San Francisco on September 11, 1919. Among other cargo she brought back, there were approximately 8,000 tonnes of graphite ore, representing by far the largest amount shipped to the Pacific US thus far.

West Cajoot departed on her next voyage on November 24, 1919, sailing from San Francisco with a variety of cargo including 1,275 bales of cotton bound for Japan. She arrived in Yokohama on December 25, 1919. On January 12, 1920, she arrived in Shanghai, stopped in Manila on January 22, touched off at Hong Kong on January 27 before heading back. West Cajoot left Hong Kong on February 4 and arrived in Honolulu on February 23, 1920.

=== Cosmopolitan Steamship Company (1920-1921) ===
At about the same time West Cajoot was allocated to Cosmopolitan Steamship Company to operate on their routes. On May 10, 1920 West Cajoot was reallocated to Struthers & Dixon to operate on Pacific routes following an affiliation of Cosmopolitan Steamship Company and Struthers & Dixon. This reassignment turned her journey into a round-the-world trip, as her destination was changed to New York City. After leaving Honolulu on February 24, she passed through Panama Canal on March 16, 1920, with a load of rice bound for Santiago de Cuba, arriving there on March 20. From Cuba she proceeded north and arrived in Philadelphia on April 29. She left Philadelphia on May 5 after loading 2,712 tonnes of bituminous coal, arrived in New York City on May 7, and from there proceeded to St. Nazaire and reached it on June 23, 1920. Continuing on her voyage, West Cajoot left France on June 29, and reached New York City on July 15. At the end of July she sailed for Norfolk where she arrived on August 2 and was hired to transport coal for the US Naval base of Pearl Harbor. West Cajoot departed Norfolk on August 10, 1920, arriving in Panama Canal zone on August 31. She stayed here for 11 days while undergoing repairs to her engines, eventually leaving for Hawaii on September 10. She arrived in Honolulu in early October. On October 10, 1920, while being towed due to a broken propeller blade, West Cajoot collided with steamer Claudine. Fortunately, the damage to either vessel was minimal. After undergoing repairs, West Cajoot departed Honolulu on October 24, and arrived in San Francisco on November 1.

In December 1920 West Cajoot was chartered to transport among other things about 1,000 tonnes of various equipment for an oil exploration project in the Philippines. She left San Francisco on December 15, 1920, arrived in Manila on January 14, 1921, and unloaded all the equipment in the mouth of Pagsanghan River a few days after. From there she proceeded to Hong Kong and Shanghai loading cargo, and departing on February 28 for a return trip. She returned to San Francisco on March 29, 1921, bringing among other things almost 13,000 bales of camel wool (3,450 tonnes) from China. The wool was shipped via railroads to New York and Boston.

On April 22, 1921 West Cajoot was returned to the USSB due to the overabundance of cargo space and laid up.

=== Struthers & Barry (1923-August 1926) ===
In October 1923 West Cajoot was put for maintenance at Crawley Shipyards of Oakland in preparation of her return to active service. After the maintenance was finished, she was allocated to Struthers & Barry to serve on their Pacific route from Los Angeles and San Francisco to Yokohama, Kobe, Shanghai, Manila, Hong Kong and Singapore as part of their American Far East Line. On her first trip she sailed out from San Francisco on January 8, 1924, stopped at Kobe on February 14, Manila on March 10, and after completing her oriental trip, she discharged about 1,100 tonnes of cargo in Los Angeles before dropping anchor in San Francisco on May 12, 1924. Among the cargo she brought back, there were 130,000 feet of Philippine mahogany, copra and furniture.

For her next trip she loaded up, among other things, with cases of oil and gasoline and departed from San Francisco in mid-September 1924. She arrived in Yokohama on October 5, 1924, and proceed through Chinese ports to Singapore where she arrived on November 8, 1924. Leaving Singapore on November 13, West Cajoot returned to San Francisco on January 5, 1925.

She again left for the Orient in mid-January 1925, through Yokohama (February 17), Shanghai (February 26), Haiphong (March 6) arriving in Singapore on March 21, 1925. She left from Singapore on March 26, arriving in Zamboanga on April 1, and after visiting a handful of small ports in the Philippines, West Cajoot departed Manila on March 15, heading to Hong Kong and from there to San Francisco. She dropped the anchor on May 16, bringing among other things, 449 tonnes of wild animal collection of noted hunter Frank Buck. The animals came from India and were loaded on board in Singapore and included cobra collection destined for New York City Zoo, snakes, elephants, leopards, tigers etc. Most of the cargo was consigned to Al G. Barnes, a circus owner.

On June 6, 1925 West Cajoot departed San Francisco for another trip to the Orient, arriving in Yokohama at the end of June. Leaving from Yokohama on June 30, she touched off at Yokaichi (July 1), Kobe (July 2), Dairen (July 8), Taku Bar, Qingdao (July 13) arriving in Shanghai on July 17. From there she headed to Hong Kong on July 20 where she arrived on July 24. From Hong Kong she traveled to the Philippines and arrived in Manila on July 30. From Manila West Cajoot proceeded to visit a variety of small Philippine ports, such as Cebu, Zamboanga, Davao and so on, eventually returning to Manila at the end of August. She sailed out on September 1 for Hong Kong, and from there continued on to San Francisco. She returned to San Francisco on October 2, 1925, and from there proceeded to Los Angeles where she arrived on October 8.

She immediately sailed out for her next trip to the Orient, departing from San Francisco on October 23, arriving in Yokohama on November 19. From there she proceeded to Kobe, and then on to Korea, touching off at Busan on November 26, and Chemulpo 4 days later. West Cajoot continued on her trip touching off at several Chinese ports such as Dairen and Qingdao before a stop in Shanghai on December 15. From there she touched off in Hong Kong and continued on to the Philippines arriving in Manila on Christmas Day. She then stopped off at various small ports around the Philippines before departing for San Francisco where she arrived on February 13, 1926, bringing back coconut meal, copra and by-products. After unloading West Cajoot proceeded to Los Angeles where she arrived on February 21, 1926. She was immediately put into dry-dock to undergo installation of deep tanks to allow transportation of vegetable and coconut oil from the Philippines.

The work was finished in mid-March and on March 19 West Cajoot sailed from Los Angeles with a cargo of case oil and took course to the Orient. After stopping off in San Francisco on March 20, and taking on more case oil, West Cajoot sailed next day to Shanghai. She arrived in China in mid-April, visiting ports like Hong Kong and Fuzhou before heading to the Philippines. After stopping off at a variety of small ports West Cajoot departed from Manila on June 8, arriving in San Francisco on July 8, 1926.

On June 17, 1926, it was reported that USSB decided to consolidate the American Far East Line and the Pacific Australian Line and put the consolidated line under Swayne & Holt management.

West Cajoot departed from San Francisco for her last journey under Struthers & Barry flag on August 10, 1926, to Yokohama. She arrived there on August 27 and from there proceeded to Chinese ports, including Hong Kong where she touched off on September 10, and from there proceeded to Singapore. West Cajoot made a stopover in Singapore on October 10, picking up among other things a few boxers on their way to a tournament in Manila. After touching off at several ports in Philippines, West Cajoot returned to San Francisco on December 4, 1926, with a cargo of copra.

=== Swayne & Holt (August 1926-1928) ===
West Cajoot departed San Francisco on her first journey under a new management company on December 29, 1926. After stopping off in Los Angeles two days later, she proceeded on her way with a load of general cargo, and almost 2,000,000 feet of timber to New Zealand and Australia. She arrived at Auckland on January 27, 1927, and from there proceeded to Wellington (February 5), Melbourne (February 15), Sydney (February 21), Brisbane (February 28). From Brisbane West Cajoot sailed towards the Philippines, visiting Davao, Zamboanga, Cebu, and Manila. From there she proceeded to Hong Kong and then took course back to San Francisco where she arrived on May 6, 1927, with a load of copra and Philippine hardwood.

On her next trip West Cajoot departed Los Angeles on June 18, 1927, laden among other things with 200 barrels of asphalt, 25,000 cases of gasoline and 800 barrels of resin. The ship arrived in Melbourne on July 20, Sydney on July 26, 1927, and from there proceeded to Brisbane (arriving on August 2). After stopping off at Port Moresby on August 21 to load 525 tons of copra, the ship proceeded to Hong Kong, Manila and the Philippines. West Cajoot left Manila on September 23, 1927, with 1,223,583 pounds of coconut oil destined for a soap company in Los Angeles. In the early morning of October 2, 1927, the vessel struck some obstruction in Van Diemen Straits, off the Japanese coast, forcing the ship to alter her course for Kobe, where she arrived on the evening of October 3, 1927. Repairs to the vessel were made on dry dock. West Cajoot left Kobe early on November 1, 1927, stopping off at Yokohama, and arriving at San Francisco on November 22, 1927. She was dry-docked at that port for further examination, and left for Los Angeles on November 29, arriving at her destination on the morning of December 1.

=== Oceanic & Oriental Navigation Company (1928-1937) ===
In October 1927, the Los Angeles Times reported on the impending sale of West Cajoot and 18 other Swayne & Holt ships to a San Francisco financier. The ship later became a part of the fleet of the Oceanic and Oriental Navigation Company, a joint venture between Oceanic-Matson, a subsidiary of Matson Navigation Company, and the American-Hawaiian Steamship Company, established to take over operation of transpacific routes that had been managed for the USSB by Swayne & Holt Lines. On April 3, 1928, it was reported that 8 ships acquired by Matson were renamed - Admiral Dewey, West Carmona, West Cajoot, West Calera, West Conob, West Elcajon, West Nivaria, and West Togus becoming Golden State, Golden Fleece, Golden Bear, Golden Harvest, Golden Eagle, Golden Kauri, Golden Coast, and Golden Forrest, respectively.

Golden Bear made her first voyage under a new flag from Los Angeles on October 1, 1928, arriving in Auckland on October 27. After stopping at several New Zealand ports, the ship left Lyttelton on November 17 for Honolulu and San Francisco, arriving there on December 21, 1928. The ship then proceeded to the Pacific Northwest where it loaded up timber and departed Vancouver on January 14, 1929. After a stop in Seattle, San Francisco and Los Angeles to load more cargo, the ship took course to Auckland where she arrived on February 27, 1929. After stops at several ports in New Zealand, Golden Bear left Timaru for Honolulu (arrived April 12) and San Francisco. From there, the ship again proceeded to the Pacific Northwest to load timber, and departed on another trip, this time to Australia. Leaving Tacoma on May 9, the ship made stopovers in Portland, San Francisco and Los Angeles to load general cargo and case oil before heading for Melbourne where she arrived on June 20. After stopping off at Sydney (July 1) and Newcastle (July 4), Golden Bear proceeded to Honolulu and San Francisco, reaching it on August 15.

The vessel continued travelling between Pacific Coast of the US, carrying mostly timber, oil, and general cargo to Australia, and occasionally New Zealand through 1937. She departed for her last trip from Tacoma on February 20, 1937, stopped off to load more cargo at Los Angeles on March 10, 1937, before proceeding to Auckland. On March 30, 1937, it was reported that Oceanic & Oriental Navigation Company (O&ON) would be halting the service to Australia as of April 1. At the time the measure was considered temporary due to uncertainty of the renewal of mail rates by the new Maritime Commission. As the new contract was not granted to O&ON, the service was suspended indefinitely due to economic hardship to operate the route without a substantial subsidy from the government.

After reaching Auckland on April 12, Golden Bear proceeded to Australia where the ship stopped at several ports before loading 406 tons of coal at Newcastle and sailing for Rabaul on May 14. Golden Bear was present in Rabaul harbor during the great Rabaul eruption on May 30, 1937, and assisted in evacuation of approximately 750 town inhabitants to Kokopo. The ship returned to Rabaul on June 12 before departing for Solomon Islands, and from there continued on to San Francisco where the ship arrived on July 21. Golden Bear remained berthed in San Francisco for the remainder of the year. In mid December it was reported that O&ON was dissolved with the fleet being divided between the Line's co-owners. Matson acquired Golden Eagle, Golden River, Golden Bear and Golden State, while the rest of the ships were acquired by American-Hawaiian Steamship Company.

== Operational history under Soviet Union flag ==
=== Far Eastern Shipping Company(6 November 1942 - 19 December 1947) ===
As per Lend-Lease Agreement the ship Kailua (ex. West Cajoot) was adopted by the Soviet procurement commission on 6 of November, 1942. The ship was renamed Выборг (Russian: Vyborg) and included in the Far Eastern State Sea Shipping Company (it was renamed Far Eastern Shipping Company later). During the World War II the ship was used as one of the paramilitary ships of the Far Eastern Basin, the ship carried out export-import shipments between the Pacific ports of the USSR and its allies. The steamer was lost in Nagaev Bay due explosion of dangerous cargo on December 19, 1947, and excluded from the list of ships of the Ministry on 22 December 1948.

The Soviet classification of the ships marked all design 1013 ships under Soviet Union flag, ex US West-class ships, as Belorussia-class cargo ships.

To see article Belorussia-class cargo ships.
