= Mauna Loa (disambiguation) =

Mauna Loa is a volcano in Hawaii.

Mauna Loa may also refer to:

- Mauna Loa Observatory, an observatory on the slopes of that volcano
- Mauna Loa Solar Observatory, another observatory on that volcano
- Mauna Loa Macadamia Nut Corporation, a macadamia nut company based in Hawaii
- Maunaloa, Hawaii, a community on the Hawaiian island of Moloka'i
- SS Mauna Loa, a steam-powered cargo ship
- USS Mauna Loa, the name of more than one United States Navy ship
- West Molokai Volcano, an extinct volcano sometimes called Mauna Loa
