= Vyborg (disambiguation) =

Vyborg is a town in Leningrad Oblast, Russia.

Vyborg may also refer to:

- Vyborg (airline), a former airline based in St. Petersburg, Russia
- Vyborg Library, a library in Vyborg, Leningrad Oblast, Russia
- Vyborg railway station, a railway station in Vyborg, Leningrad Oblast, Russia
- Vyborg Shipyard, a shipyard in Vyborg, Leningrad Oblast, Russia
- Finnish coastal defence ship Väinämöinen or Vyborg
- US West Cajoot or Vyborg, a Soviet cargo ship in 1942–1947
- Vyborg, a Soviet ship sunk by the Finnish submarine Vesikko in 1941

== See also ==
- Siege of Vyborg (disambiguation)
- Viborg (disambiguation)
- Vyborgsky (disambiguation)
- Viipuri (disambiguation)
- Sveaborg, a sea fortress near Helsinki, Finland
