= SS West Elcajon =

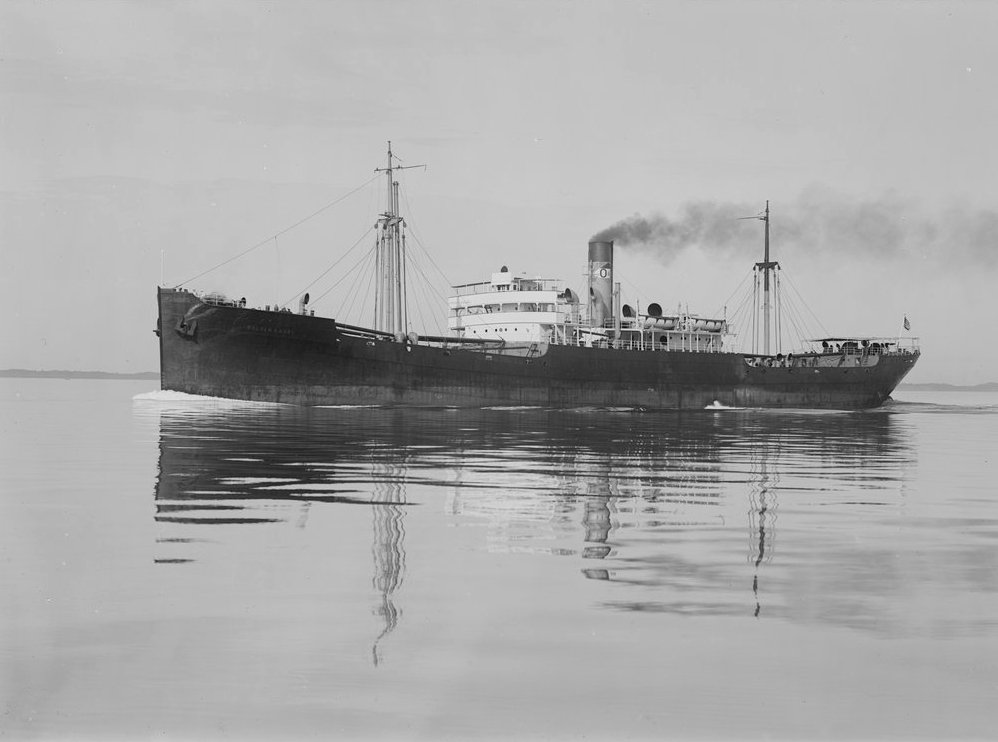
- SS Golden Kauri (formerly West Elcajon) underway, date unknown

History
- Name: SS West Elcajon
- Operator: 1919: U.S. Navy; 1919: U.S. Shipping Board; 1926: Swayne & Hoyt; 1928: Oceanic & Oriental; 1938: Matson Line; 1946: Paralos
- Builder: Skinner & Eddy
- Yard number: 37 (USSB #1926)
- Launched: 7 December 1918
- Christened: SS West Elcajon
- Completed: December 1918
- Commissioned: 18 Jan 1919–26 May 1919
- Renamed: 1919: USS West Elcajon (ID-3907); 1919: West Elcajon; 1928: Golden Kauri; 1938: Waipio; 1946: Paralos
- Fate: Scrapped 1954

General characteristics
- Type: Design 1013 cargo ship
- Tonnage: 5,600 gross, 8,800 dwt
- Displacement: 12,225 tons
- Length: 423 ft 9 in (129.16 m); 410 ft 5 in (125.10 m) bp
- Beam: 54 ft (16 m)
- Draft: 24 ft 2 in (7.37 m)
- Depth of hold: 29 ft 9 in (9.07 m)
- Installed power: 1 × Curtis geared turbine
- Propulsion: Single propeller
- Speed: 11.5 kn (21.3 km/h)
- Complement: WWI (USN): 70; Merchant: about 30

SS West Elcajon (often misspelled West El Cajon) was a steel-hulled cargo ship built in 1918 for the United States Shipping Board's World War I emergency wartime shipbuilding program.

Completed just too late to see service in the war, West Elcajon was nevertheless commissioned into the U.S. Navy as USS West Elcajon (ID-3907), participating in one postwar famine relief mission to Eastern Europe before decommissioning in May 1919.

After decommission, the ship was laid up for several years until resuming service in 1926 as the merchant ship SS West Elcajon, operating between the United States and the Far East. In 1928, she was purchased by the Matson Line, renamed SS Golden Kauri, and employed in the timber trade between the U.S. and Australia. In late 1928, she became embroiled in a violent Australian industrial dispute.

In 1938, the ship was renamed SS Waipio, and in 1946 she was sold to Panamanian interests and renamed SS Paralos. Paralos was scrapped in Japan in 1954.

== Construction and design ==
West Elcajon was built in Seattle, Washington in 1918 at the No. 2 Plant of the Skinner & Eddy Corporation—the 22nd in a series of 24 Design 1013 cargo ships built by Skinner & Eddy for the USSB's emergency wartime shipbuilding program.

West Elcajon had a design deadweight tonnage of 8,800 tons and gross register tonnage of 5,600. She had an overall length of 423 feet 9 inches (129.16 m), a beam of 54 feet (16 m) and a mean draft of 24 feet 2 inches (7.37 m). The ship was powered by a Curtis geared turbine, driving a single screw propeller and delivering a speed of 11.5 knots.

== Service history ==
=== U.S Navy service, 1919 ===
After completion of the vessel in December 1918, West Elcajon was delivered to the Navy for operation with the Naval Overseas Transportation Service (NOTS), and commissioned at the Puget Sound Navy Yard on 18 January 1919 as USS West Elcajon (ID-3907).

USS West Elcajon commenced her first and only mission for the Navy by loading 7,282 tons of flour consigned to the United States Food Administration for the purpose of alleviating a postwar famine in Eastern Europe. Departing on 1 February for the east coast of the U.S. via the Panama Canal, the ship reached Hampton Roads, Virginia on 5 March, before continuing on to Baltimore the same day to refuel. On 12 March, she sailed for the Adriatic via Gibraltar. Arriving at Trieste on 8 April, West Elcajon unloaded part of her cargo before transferring to Palermo to deliver the remainder.

Having unloaded her cargo, West Elcajon departed for New York on 26 May, arriving on the 15th. On 26 May, she was decommissioned and returned to control of the U.S. Shipping Board.

=== Merchant service ===
West Elcajon's mercantile career began inauspiciously when, not long after her decommission from the Navy, she was laid up with no work for almost five years on the mud flats at Benicia, California. With the postwar oversupply of shipping easing by the late 1920s, the ship was taken out of mothballs, reconditioned, and placed into merchant service with the American and Australian Orient Line, a subsidiary of Swayne and Hoyt, in late 1926 as SS West Elcajon.

For the next two years, West Ejcajon operated from the west coast ports of San Francisco and Los Angeles to a variety of destinations in the Pacific and Far East, including Hong Kong, China, Japan, the Philippines and New Zealand. On one voyage from Los Angeles to China and Japan commencing in April 1927, for example, West Elcajon sailed with almost 8,000 tons of cargo including 70,000 cases of kerosene, 5,500 drums of gasoline, 700 tons of old newspapers and copper wire and general cargo. On another run in November the same year, the ship returned to Los Angeles Harbor with 800,000 board feet (1,900 m^{3}) of Philippine mahogany and 2,000 cases of East Indian rubber.

After Swayne & Hoyt ran into financial difficulties, its subsidiary the American and Australian Orient Line was purchased in early 1928 by the Matson Line, which created a new company, the Oceanic and Oriental Navigation Company, to manage the newly acquired ships. To mark the change of ownership, Matson gave the ships new names, with the common prefix "Golden". West Elcajon thus became SS Golden Kauri, a name she would retain until 1939.

==== Dog Collar strike ====
In August 1928, Golden Kauri set out on her first voyage to Australia since the change of ownership with a cargo of 1,700,000 feet (520,000 m) of timber, 5,000 barrels of asphalt, 3,000 cases and 500 drums of gasoline and other goods, arriving at Victoria Dock, Melbourne on 18 September. At this point the ship became embroiled in a bitter local labor dispute over the so-called Dog Collar Act, a law which sought to license dockyard workers.

After union workers went on strike, some 1,700 strikebreakers were brought in to unload ships, about 80 of whom were assigned to unload Golden Kauri. On 4 October, a strikebreaker was fatally injured by timber falling from a sling being used to unload Golden Kauri, and a second strikebreaker was killed in an industrial accident the same day. Unionists jeered at the ambulance transporting the two to hospital as it passed by.

Golden Kauri departed Melbourne for Newcastle, NSW on 9 October, arriving on the 15th. On the 16th, a group of about 400 union members marched to King's Wharf to confront strikebreakers, who were ordered by police to board Golden Kauri for their safety. Unionists then charged the ship three times, attempting to get aboard, and on each occasion were driven back by baton-wielding police. The police finally dispersed the crowd with a baton charge. About 20 waterside workers were later treated in hospital for injuries sustained in the confrontation.

Golden Kauri departed Newcastle for the United States a few days later, arriving at San Francisco on or about 22 November. Her owners appear to have been undeterred by the recent mayhem on the Australian docks however, as the ship was back in Melbourne on 20 February 1929, having sailed a few weeks earlier from the lumber town of Aberdeen, Washington.

==== Later career ====
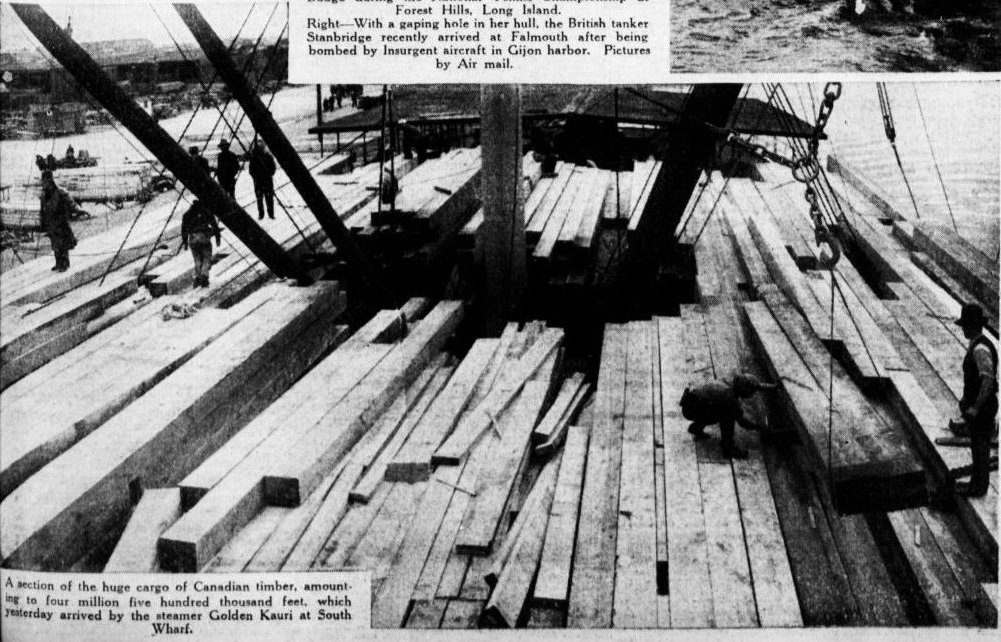
Canadian timber on the deck of Golden Kauri, Melbourne, Australia, 1937

Through the 1930s, Golden Kauri appears to have been employed in coastal service around the United States, operating between ports such as Seattle, Los Angeles, San Francisco, New Orleans and New York. On 15 October 1935, the ship sustained about $50,000 damage after a collision with the Isthmian Line freighter Steel Mariner in the San Pedro, California main channel. In September 1937, Golden Kauri was back in Australia with a "huge cargo" of 4500000 board feet of Canadian timber.

In 1938, the Oceanic and Oriental Line was wound up, and Golden Kauri came under the direct control of the parent company, Matson Lines. Shortly afterward, Golden Kauri was renamed SS Waipio. Waipio carried on in the freight and cargo trade through World War II, still home-ported in San Francisco. In 1946, Waipio was sold to Campania Paralos de Vapores, S.A of Panama, and renamed SS Paralos. Paralos was scrapped in Osaka, Japan in 1954.

== Bibliography ==
- Pacific Ports Inc. (1919): Pacific Ports Annual, Fifth Edition, 1919, pp. 64–65, 402–405, Pacific Ports Inc.
- Silverstone, Paul H. (2006): The New Navy, 1883-1922, Routledge, ISBN 978-0-415-97871-2.
