= Viborg =

Viborg may refer to:

== Places ==
- Viborg, Denmark, a city in Jutland, Denmark
  - Viborg Municipality, a Danish municipality named for the city
  - Viborg County, a former county of Denmark
  - Diocese of Viborg
  - Viborg FF, a professional football team based in Viborg
  - Viborg HK, a handball club
  - Viborg Stadium, home of Viborg FF
- Vyborg, Viipuri or Viborg, a city on the Karelian Isthmus, Leningrad Region, Russia
- Viborg Province, a former province of Finland
- Vyborg Castle
- Viborg, South Dakota, a city in South Dakota, US

== People ==
- Erik Viborg, veterinarian and botanist

== See also ==
- Viipuri (disambiguation)
- Vyborg (disambiguation)
