= Vyborgsky District =

Location of Saint Petersburg in Russia

Location of Leningrad Oblast in Russia

Vyborgsky District is the name of several administrative and municipal districts in Russia.

- Vyborgsky District, Leningrad Oblast, an administrative and municipal district of Leningrad Oblast
- Vyborgsky District, Saint Petersburg, an administrative district of the federal city of Saint Petersburg

== See also ==
- Vyborgsky (disambiguation)
