= Viipuri (disambiguation) =

Viipuri is the Finnish-language name of Vyborg, a town in Russia and a former city in Finland.

Viipuri may also refer to:

- 2258 Viipuri, a minor planet
- Viipuri (former municipality), Finland
- Viipuri Province, Finland

== See also ==
- All pages with titles containing Viipuri or Viipurin (genitive case)
- Viborg (disambiguation)
- Vyborg (disambiguation)
