= USS Mauna Loa =

USS Mauna Loa has been the name of more than one United States Navy ship, and may refer to:

- USS Mauna Loa (SP-28), a patrol boat in commission from 1917 to 1918
- SS Mauna Loa, a Matson Navigation Company ship under charter to the United States Department of War to rush supplies to the Philippines in November 1941 that was later sunk by Japanese bombs in the bombing of Darwin, Australia on 19 February 1942.
- USS Mauna Loa (AE-8), an ammunition ship in commission from 1943 to 1947, from 1955 to 1958, and from 1961 to 1971
