= Vyborgsky =

Vyborgsky (masculine), Vyborgskaya (feminine), or Vyborgskoye (neuter) may refer to:

- something or somebody related to the town of Vyborg in Leningrad Oblast, Russia
- Vyborgsky District, several districts in Russia
- Vyborgskoye Urban Settlement, a municipal formation corresponding to Vyborgskoye Settlement Municipal Formation, an administrative division of Vyborgsky District of Leningrad Oblast, Russia
- Vyborgskaya, a station of the Saint Petersburg Metro, St. Petersburg, Russia
