= Siege of Vyborg =

Siege of Vyborg may refer to:

- Siege of Viborg (1599), a successful Swedish attempt to capture Vyborg during the War Against Sigismund
- Siege of Vyborg (1706), an aborted Russian attempt to capture Vyborg, during the Great Northern War
- Siege of Vyborg (1710), a successful Russian attempt to capture Vyborg, during the Great Northern War
