= Oceanic and Oriental Navigation Company =

American shipping company (1928–1938)

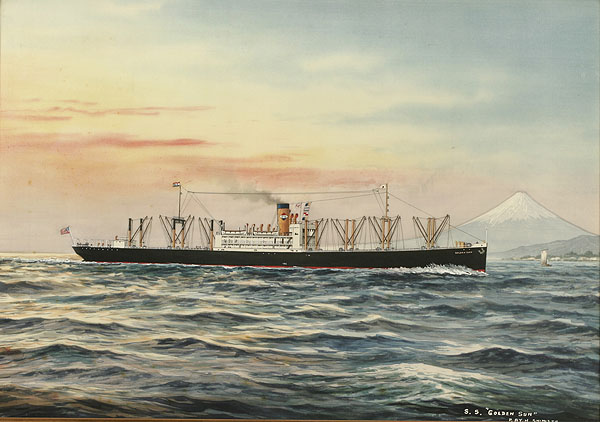
Painting of SS Golden Sun, by H. Shimidzu. Watercolor on Silk.

The Oceanic and Oriental Navigation Company, sometimes shortened to O & O, was an American shipping company that operated from 1928 to 1938. The company was a joint venture between Matson Navigation Company and the American-Hawaiian Steamship Company.

In 1927, Swayne & Hoyt Lines, a San Francisco-based shipping company, was operating the American-Australian-Orient Line cargo service with ships under charter from the United States Shipping Board (USSB). The American-Australian-Orient Line sailed between ports in the California to ports in Australia, New Zealand, and China. When Swayne & Hoyt's financial difficulties hindered their operation of the USSB ships, the Oceanic and Oriental Navigation Company was formed as a joint venture between the American-Hawaiian Steamship Company and Oceanic-Matson, a subsidiary of Matson Navigation Company, with each company holding a 50% stake in Oceanic and Oriental. Oceanic-Matson operated the California – Australia – New Zealand routes, while the American-Hawaiian Steamship Company operated the routes to China.

By 1938, Oceanic and Oriental had ceased operations.

== Bibliography ==
- de la Pedraja Tomán, René (1994). A Historical Dictionary of the U.S. Merchant Marine and Shipping Industry: Since the Introduction of Steam. Westport, Connecticut: Greenwood Press. ISBN 978-0-313-27225-7. OCLC 29311518.
