= Swayne & Hoyt =

American steamboat company

- House flag
- Company type: steamship company
- Founded: 1890s
- Founder: Robert H. Swayne,
- Defunct: 1940
- Headquarters: San Francisco, United States

Swayne & Hoyt was an American steamship company based in San Francisco, California. It was in operation from the 1890s to 1940.

== History ==
In 1850, the ship brokerage firm of Hughes and Hunter was established in San Francisco. In 1865, it became Hughes & McDaniel and, in 1871, Hughes, McDaniel and Edson. In 1873, McDaniel left the firm, and in 1879, Hughes left. The company continued as C. A. Edson & Co. Robert H. Swayne and John C. Hoyt, former employees, took over business in 1887.

Swayne & Hoyt was engaged in trade with Japan by 1896, when the company was recorded as protesting duties assessed on ceramic goods it had imported in February 1896.

Swayne & Hoyt was incorporated in August 1896 as a warehouse, commission and mercantile business in the state of California with principal area of business in San Francisco, with a capital stock of $100,000, of which $25,000 was subscribed capital.

On February 27, 1897, $200,000 worth of Chinese opium was seized in the S&H warehouse.

In 1926, the company was operating the American-Australian-Orient Line which sailed to Australia, New Zealand, and Asian ports. Also in the mid-1920s, Swayne & Hoyt was engaged in trade between Pacific ports and the east coast of South America.

By the late 1930s, Swayne & Hoyt was engaged in intercoastal shipping between U.S. ports on the Gulf of Mexico and on ports on the Pacific coast via the Panama Canal.

Swayne & Hoyt v. United States challenged the legality of an order of the United States Secretary of Commerce. The order ceased the offering of 6-month contracts at a reduced rate to clients who used the same shipping company for all of their shipping during the contract's period. The case was dismissed on the ground that Section 16 of the Shipping Act of 1916 forbids preferential treatment of any kind, and that this type of arrangement violates unrestricted competition and furthers the establishment of a monopoly. The court conceded that the arrangement benefitted both the shipowners and their clients.

Robert H. Swayne died on 8 August 1936.

The business closed on April 30, 1940, also the date of the last traditional annual company dinner party. Final employment figures were 500 seagoing personnel and 220 in the home and branch offices.
