= List of shipwrecks in 1898 =

The list of shipwrecks in 1898 includes ships sunk, foundered, grounded, or otherwise lost during 1898.

table of contents
1898
Jan	Feb	Mar	Apr
May	Jun	Jul	Aug
Sep	Oct	Nov	Dec
Unknown date

== January ==
=== 4 January ===
List of shipwrecks: 4 January 1898
Ship	State	Description
City of Little Rock	United States	The steamer struck a snag and sank in the Red River of the South at Moultrie Landing. Declared a constructive total loss.

=== 7 January ===
List of shipwrecks: 7 January 1898
Ship	State	Description
Fred Stone	United States	The laid up ferry sprung a leak and sank at Coryville, Ohio. Total loss.

=== 8 January ===
List of shipwrecks: 8 January 1898
Ship	State	Description
Favorite	United States	The steamer burned to the waterline at dock in Suffolk, Virginia.

=== 9 January ===
List of shipwrecks: 9 January 1898
Ship	State	Description
Ed. C. Kirker	United States	The steamer was sunk by a windstorm at Point Pleasant, West Virginia.
Venus	United States	The laid up steamer sprung a leak and sank at Marietta, Ohio.

=== 12 January ===
List of shipwrecks: 12 January 1898
Ship	State	Description
Mataura	United Kingdom	The ship struck a rock off Desolación Island, Chile. She was beached in Sealer's Cove and abandoned. The ship broke in two during March and was a total loss.
Relief	United States	The steamer filled and sank at Pier 3, Port Richmond, Philadelphia. Raised the next day.

=== 17 January ===
List of shipwrecks: 17 January 1898
Ship	State	Description
Water Maiden	United States	The steamer was swamped and sunk at dock by the wake of a passing vessel at Vicksburg, Mississippi. Total loss.

=== 19 January ===
List of shipwrecks: 19 January 1898
Ship	State	Description
Active	New South Wales	The ketch was wrecked without loss of life on the Oyster Bank at the entrance of Newcastle Harbour, New South Wales, Australia, near the previously wrecked schooner Colonist at approximately 32.92°S 151.79°E.
Lord O'Neill	United Kingdom	The cargo ship was wrecked in the Blasket Islands, County Kerry. Her crew took to the lifeboats. They were later rescued by Kincora (United Kingdom). Lord O'Neill was on a voyage from Baltimore, Maryland, United States to Dublin.

=== 20 January ===
List of shipwrecks: 20 January 1898
Ship	State	Description
Little Albert	United States	The steamer swamped in a severe windstorm and sank at Louisville, Kentucky. Total loss.

=== 22 January ===
List of shipwrecks: 22 January 1898
Ship	State	Description
Plucky City	United States	The steamer sank in a windstorm in the Mississippi River above Greenfield, Missouri. Raised and returned to service.

=== 23 January ===
List of shipwrecks: 23 January 1898
Ship	State	Description
Corona	United States	The steamer struck an uncharted rock off the south east end of Lewis Island in the Arthur Passage, British Columbia and sank. Raised and towed to San Francisco, California for repairs.
Eva Evert	United States	The laid up ferry was sunk by heavy swells during a severe storm at Vevay, Indiana. Raised and repaired.
James A. Dumont	United States	The tug sank in a severe gale three miles (4.8 km) east north east of the Sandy Hook Lightship. The crew were rescued by the tug D. S. Arnott (United States).
Tillie	United States	The steamer sank 30 miles (48 km) south east of Shinnecock Light. Four deaths.
Yonkers	United States	Manned by a crew of four and under tow by the tug Walter A. Luckenbach (United States) on a voyage from Newport News, Virginia, to Providence, Rhode Island, with a cargo of coal, the 187-foot (57 m), 1,265-gross register ton schooner barge sank with the loss of all hands in 110 feet (34 m) of water in the North Atlantic Ocean south of Long Island off East Hampton, New York, after her towline parted in a storm.
Zenobia	United States	The schooner struck a ledge near the Moose-a-beck, Maine Light and sank. Crew rowed to shore in her dories.

=== 24 January ===
List of shipwrecks: 24 January 1898
Ship	State	Description
J. E. Wallace	United States	The tug sank in a hurricane despite seeking refuge behind the Sandy Hook Lightship. The crew got onboard the lightship.

=== 25 January ===
List of shipwrecks: 25 January 1898
Ship	State	Description
Koonya	New South Wales	Koonya The screw steamer was wrecked on a reef off Cronulla Beach, Port Hacking, New South Wales, Australia, without loss of life.

=== 26 January ===
List of shipwrecks: 26 January 1898
Ship	State	Description
City of Duluth	United States	The passenger/cargo steamer struck the bar entering St. Joseph, Michigan in a gale and was driven ashore 350 feet (110 m) west of the North Pier, was wrecked, and broke up.

=== 29 January ===
List of shipwrecks: 29 January 1898
Ship	State	Description
Tragabigzanda	United States	The schooner struck Cedar Island ledge near the Isles of Shoals in thick fog.

=== 31 January ===
List of shipwrecks: 31 January 1898
Ship	State	Description
City of Glouchester	United States	The steamer struck "the Graves" in Boston Harbor and was beached to prevent sinking. Afterward the vessel was refloated and towed to Boston.

=== Unknown date ===
List of shipwrecks: Unknown date January 1898
Ship	State	Description
Alaska	United States	While operating as a ferry on a service between Wrangell, District of Alaska, and the Stikine River, the small steamer became a total loss after she struck a rock in Southeast Alaska.
Waipara	United Kingdom	The cargo ship was driven ashore and wrecked at Okarito, New Zealand.

== February ==
=== 1 February ===
List of shipwrecks: 1 February 1898
Ship	State	Description
Barracouta	United States	The schooner went ashore and was wrecked in a severe gale in Pigeon Cove, Massachusetts.
Channel Queen	United Kingdom	Steaming from Plymouth to the Channel Islands, the vessel was wrecked in bad weather and fog on the Black Rock, 1.5 nautical miles (2.8 km) off Guernsey. Forty were saved but 14 passengers and 5 crew were drowned.
Charley Stedman	United States	The schooner went ashore and was wrecked in a severe gale in Pigeon Cove, Massachusetts.
Daniel Webster	United States	The sloop went ashore and was wrecked in a severe gale in Pigeon Cove, Massachusetts. Three crewmen died.
Defiance	United States	The schooner went ashore and was wrecked in a severe gale at Sand Point, near Shelburne, Nova Scotia, a total loss. The crew was saved.
Davey Crockett	United States	The fishing schooner went ashore and was wrecked in a severe gale in Pigeon Cove, Massachusetts, a total loss. The crew was ashore at the time.
David A. Osier	United States	The schooner went ashore in a severe gale in Plymouth, Massachusetts. The crew were saved.
Frank Scripture	United States	The steamer broke free from her dock in Pigeon Cove, Massachusetts during a severe gale and was wrecked on rocks, a total loss. One crewman killed.
H. W. Hills	United States	The steamer sank at dock in East Boston, Massachusetts.
Marcella	United States	The fishing schooner sank in a gale off Gloucester, Massachusetts. Lost with all six hands.
Senorita	United States	The sloop – probably 23.8 feet (7.3 m) in length – departed Seattle, Washington, bound for Juneau, District of Alaska, with a crew of seven men and was never seen or heard from again.
Volunteer	United States	The fishing schooner sank in a severe gale on Bank Quero. The crew were saved by Arthur D. Story (United States).

=== 2 February ===
List of shipwrecks: 2 February 1898
Ship	State	Description
Montezuma	United States	The steamer while laying at the bank at Holloway's Landing, Kentucky, across the river from Mound City, Illinois sprung a leak and sank. Total loss.
Wave	United States	The steamer sank at Hill's Wharf, Providence, Rhode Island from unknown causes.

=== 5 February ===
List of shipwrecks: 5 February 1898
Ship	State	Description
Clara Nevada	United States	The propeller shaft of Clara Nevada on the sea floor. The passenger steamer struck an uncharted rock several hundred yards north of Eldred Rock in Lynn Canal in the District of Alaska and sank immediately with the loss of all on board, approximately 12 passengers and 21 crewmen.

=== 6 February ===
List of shipwrecks: 6 February 1898
Ship	State	Description
Veendam	Netherlands	The ocean liner hit a derelict ship in the North Atlantic and sank, with all on board saved.

=== 9 February ===
List of shipwrecks: 9 February 1898
Ship	State	Description
Port Admiral	United States	The 38-gross register ton, 60-foot (18.3 m) schooner was wrecked during a gale and snowstorm in Lynn Canal at Skagway, District of Alaska.

=== 10 February ===
List of shipwrecks: 10 February 1898
Ship	State	Description
Mystic	United States	The yacht struck a snag in the Edisto River two miles (3.2 km) below the Jacksonboro, South Carolina Bridge and sank in four feet (1.2 m) of water.

=== 15 February ===
List of shipwrecks: 15 February 1898
Ship	State	Description
USS Maine	United States Navy	USS Maine The armored cruiser (often referred to as a "battleship") sank in the harbor at Havana, Cuba, after an on-board explosion.

=== 16 February ===
List of shipwrecks: 16 February 1898
Ship	State	Description
Ericsson	United States	The steamer careened, filled, and sank during a northwest gale in shallow water in Wilmington Creek.

=== 17 February ===
List of shipwrecks: 17 February 1898
Ship	State	Description
Doc B.	United States	The steamer sank at dock over night in Norfolk, Virginia, possibly caught on dock on a rising tide, tipping, filling and sinking.
St. M. V. T. Co. No. 34	United States	The barge, under the tow of Henry Lowery (United States), struck a snag and sank off Fletchers Landing, Arkansas in the Mississippi River. Total loss

=== 19 February ===
List of shipwrecks: 19 February 1898
Ship	State	Description
Canada	United States	With a cargo of lumber, hay, grain, and four horses aboard, the 1,190.58-gross register ton, 176.6-foot (53.8 m) bark broke her moorings and went adrift during a gale and was wrecked at Skagway, District of Alaska. Her crew survived.

=== 23 February ===
List of shipwrecks: 23 February 1898
Ship	State	Description
Two Brothers	United States	The steamer sank overnight at Shire Oak on the Monongahela River. Raised afterwards.

=== 25 February ===
List of shipwrecks: 25 February 1898
Ship	State	Description
Plover	United Kingdom	The 106-foot (32 m), 144-ton steam trawler was sunk in a collision with St. Andrew (Norway) off Islay near the Dubh Artach lighthouse. Survivors were picked up by the trawler Teal (United Kingdom). One crewman was killed.

=== 28 February ===
List of shipwrecks: 28 February 1898
Ship	State	Description
Camilla	United States	The steamer was sunk in a collision with Paoli (United States) off Lewis Wharf, Boston, Massachusetts.

=== Unknown date ===
List of shipwrecks: Unknown date February 1898
Ship	State	Description
Midas	United Kingdom	The barque departed Nagasaki, Japan, bound for the United States West Coast sometime around 14 February and was never heard from again. She probably sank with the loss of all hands in a violent storm other ships reported encountering along the same route at around the same time.

== March ==
=== 1 March ===
List of shipwrecks: 1 March 1898
Ship	State	Description
Eliza Anderson	United States	Anchored at Unalaska on Unalaska Island in the Aleutian Islands since she had been abandoned there in September 1897 during a voyage from Seattle, Washington, to St. Michael, District of Alaska, by a group of miners who had been defrauded into believing she was seaworthy enough for the trip, the 197-ton schooner-rigged sidewheel paddle steamer was wrecked when she dragged her anchor during a gale and was stranded on the beach. Only one person, a watchman, was aboard.

=== 3 March ===
List of shipwrecks: 3 March 1898
Ship	State	Description
William Ernst	United States	The steamer struck a rock and sank in Machine Ripple in the Great Kanawha River. Raised and taken to Middleport, Ohio for repairs.

=== 4 March ===
List of shipwrecks: 4 March 1898
Ship	State	Description
Whitelaw	United States	The 363.14-gross register ton, 145-foot (44.2 m) cargo liner was destroyed by fire while at anchor in the harbor at Skagway, District of Alaska. There was no loss of life.

=== 8 March ===
List of shipwrecks: 8 March 1898
Ship	State	Description
City of Sitka	United States	During a voyage from Sitka to Wrangell, District of Alaska, with three people aboard, the small two-masted schooner was lost off Cape Ommaney (56°10′00″N 134°40′20″W) in Southeast Alaska.

=== 9 March ===
List of shipwrecks: 9 March 1898
Ship	State	Description
City of Savannah	United States	The steamer burned to the waterline and sank at Memphis, Tennessee. Total loss

=== 11 March ===
List of shipwrecks: 11 March 1898
Ship	State	Description
G. B. Monteith	United States	The steamer swamped in a windstorm and sank while tied up to the bank at Troy, Indiana in the Ohio River. Total loss.
S. D. Barlow	United States	The steamer burned to the waterline while laying at the bank at Bird's Point, Missouri. Total loss.

=== 13 March ===
List of shipwrecks: 13 March 1898
Ship	State	Description
Grand Republic	United States	The laid-up steamer burned at St. Louis, Missouri. Total loss.

=== 15 March ===
List of shipwrecks: 15 March 1898
Ship	State	Description
Rosa Bland	United States	The steamer struck a snag and sank in the Red River of the South at Douglas Landing. Total loss.

=== 19 March ===
List of shipwrecks: 19 March 1898
Ship	State	Description
Col. T. G. Sparks	United States	When the water level fell while she was moored to a dock, the laid-up steamer was punctured by a snag sank in the Red River of the South at San Gabriel, Louisiana.

=== 20 March ===
List of shipwrecks: 20 March 1898
Ship	State	Description
Clan Lindsay	United Kingdom	The steamship was wrecked in Mazeppa Bay, Cape Colony.

=== 24 March ===
List of shipwrecks: 24 March 1898
Ship	State	Description
RMS China	United Kingdom	RMS China The steamship ran aground on Perim Island, Aden Colony. She was refloated on 15 September.

=== 25 March ===
List of shipwrecks: 25 March 1898
Ship	State	Description
Stad Nieuport	Belgium	The steamer departed Antwerp, Belgium, bound for King's Lynn, Norfolk, United Kingdom. No further trace.

=== 27 March ===
List of shipwrecks: 27 March 1898
Ship	State	Description
Velnette	United States	The steamer sank at dock in Jacksonville, Florida. Promptly raised.

=== 29 March ===
List of shipwrecks: 29 March 1898
Ship	State	Description
Filibustier	French Navy	The Filibustier-class torpedo boat sank after colliding with the protected cruiser Friant (French Navy) during night maneuvers.

=== 30 March ===
List of shipwrecks: 30 March 1898
Ship	State	Description
Sitka (or City of Sitka)	United States	The 17.44-ton, 41.5-foot (12.6 m) two-masted sealing and trading schooner was lost off Cape Ommaney (56°10′00″N 134°40′20″W) in Southeast Alaska during a voyage from Sitka to Fort Wrangell, District of Alaska. Her entire crew of three perished. The schooner Northern Star (United States) salvaged her masts.

=== 31 March ===
List of shipwrecks: 31 March 1898
Ship	State	Description
Ella C.	United States	The steamer burned at anchor in Little Bay, Virginia. Total loss.
Job T. Wilson	United States	The tow steamer burned at Bacon Wharf in the St. Marys River. Total loss.

=== Unknown date ===
List of shipwrecks: Unknown date March 1898
Ship	State	Description
Bay of Panama	Unknown	The sailing ship was wrecked under Nare Head, near St Keverne, Cornwall, United Kingdom, during a great blizzard. The ship carried jute from Calcutta; Eighteen of those on board died while nineteen were saved.
Eliza Anderson	United States	The abandoned sidewheel paddle steamer broke her moorings and was driven ashore during a storm at Dutch Harbor, District of Alaska, a total loss.
Henry Harvey	United Kingdom	The brigantine was stranded on Battery Rocks, Penzance, Cornwall, United Kingdom, during a gale. Five people aboard were rescued by lifeboat.

== April ==
=== 2 April ===
List of shipwrecks: 2 April 1898
Ship	State	Description
Laira	United Kingdom	Laira The ship was run into by Wakatipu ( (United Kingdom of Great Britain and Ireland) New Zealand) and sank at Dunedin, New Zealand.

=== 4 April ===
List of shipwrecks: 4 April 1898
Ship	State	Description
Alice	United States	The fishing schooner burned at Monrovia, Liberia.

=== 6 April ===
List of shipwrecks: 6 April 1898
Ship	State	Description
Henry Morrison	United States	The steamer burned at dock at Winthrop, Massachusetts.

=== 7 April ===
List of shipwrecks: 7 April 1898
Ship	State	Description
Stella	United States	The steamer blew the head of the mud drum out through the ship's side, causing her to capsize and sink in the Great Kanawha River.

=== 8 April ===
List of shipwrecks: 8 April 1898
Ship	State	Description
Douglass	United States	The tug was sunk in a collision with Emma C. Knowles (United States) when the schooner's anchor holed her hull below the waterline in the Ashley River near the Bees Ferry Drawbridge.

=== 9 April ===
List of shipwrecks: 9 April 1898
Ship	State	Description
John K. Davidson	United States	The steamer struck a snag and sank in the Allegheny River. Raised afterwards.
Metamora	United States	The steamer sank at dock in Palatka, Florida.

=== 11 April ===
List of shipwrecks: 11 April 1898
Ship	State	Description
Mercury	United States	With a crew of 40 and 1,500 tons of general merchandise aboard, the 1,050.29-gross register ton, 193-foot (58.8 m) wooden ship was stranded in the harbor at Skagway, District of Alaska, after she dragged her anchor during a gale. She later was refloated and placed back in service as a barge.

=== 12 April ===
List of shipwrecks: 12 April 1898
Ship	State	Description
Memphis	United States	The steamer burned at dock and sank at Vicksburg, Mississippi. Total loss.

=== 13 April ===
List of shipwrecks: 13 April 1898
Ship	State	Description
R. M. Blackburn	United States	The steamer struck a snag and sank in Pool No. 5 in the Monongahela River. Raised afterwards.

=== 15 April ===
List of shipwrecks: 15 April 1898
Ship	State	Description
Twilight	United States	The steamer struck a pier of the old Aqueduct Bridge and sank in Pittsburgh, Pennsylvania in the Allegheny River. One crewman drowned. Raised afterwards.

=== 17 April ===
List of shipwrecks: 17 April 1898
Ship	State	Description
Crofton Hall	United Kingdom	The barque ran aground on Cape Sable Island, Nova Scotia. Her crew were rescued by breeches buoy. She was on a voyage from Dundee, Perthshire to New York, United States.
Mayflower	United States	The steamer struck a sandbar in the Mississippi River one mile (1.6 km) above Chester, Illinois and sank. Raised, repaired, and returned to service.

=== 22 April ===
List of shipwrecks: 22 April 1898
Ship	State	Description
Atlantis	United States	During a voyage to Skagway, District of Alaska, the steam schooner was lost near Yellow Rock Light (54°47′30″N 131°13′45″W) in Southeast Alaska near Dixon Entrance, 6.5 nautical miles (12.0 km; 7.5 mi) south of Duke Island in the Alexander Archipelago. All on board survived, but she was deemed a total loss.

=== 23 April ===
List of shipwrecks: 23 April 1898
Ship	State	Description
Leah	United States	The steamer was forced by a strong current into the bridge at Abbeville, Louisiana in the Atchafalaya River resulting in her sinking. Total loss.

=== 25 April ===
List of shipwrecks: 25 April 1898
Ship	State	Description
Elsie	United States	During a voyage from Seattle, Washington, to Unalaska in the Aleutian Islands with 24 miners, a crew of five, and a cargo of 80,000 pounds (36,000 kg) of lumber and miners' supplies aboard, the 67.7-foot (20.6 m) schooner was wrecked without loss of life on the northeast coast of Chirikof Island in the Gulf of Alaska. She was deemed a total loss.

=== 27 April ===
List of shipwrecks: 27 April 1898
Ship	State	Description
Servia	United States	The bulk carrier burned in a gale between West Superior, Wisconsin and Prescott, Ontario when a man tripped with a lit candle. The crew were rescued by Alberta (Canada), that also saved two vessels she was towing.

=== 28 April ===
List of shipwrecks: 28 April 1898
Ship	State	Description
Cadet	United States	The steamer went ashore on Shirley Gut, Boston Harbor. Heavy seas lifted her stern and wind drove her ashore, total loss.

=== 29 April ===
List of shipwrecks: 29 April 1898
Ship	State	Description
John Harlan	United States	The tug was struck by a gale off Cape Lookout and sought shelter in Lookout Bight where she went ashore. Later refloated.

== May ==
=== 1 May ===
List of shipwrecks: 1 May 1898
Ship	State	Description
Castilla	Spanish Navy	Castilla Spanish–American War, Battle of Manila Bay: The Aragon-class cruiser was shelled and sunk in Manila Bay by ships of the Asiatic Squadron (United States Navy).
Don Antonio de Ulloa	Spanish Navy	Don Antonio de Ulloa Spanish–American War, Battle of Manila Bay: The Velasco-class cruiser was shelled and sunk in Manila Bay by ships of the Asiatic Squadron (United States Navy).
Don Juan de Austria	Spanish Navy	Don Juan de Austria Spanish–American War, Battle of Manila Bay: The Velasco-class cruiser was shelled and sunk in Manila Bay by ships of the Asiatic Squadron (United States Navy). Later salvaged and placed in service as USS Don Juan de Austria (United States Navy).
Elcano	Spanish Navy	Spanish–American War, Battle of Manila Bay:The General Concha-class gunboat was shelled by ships of the Asiatic Squadron (United States Navy) off Sangley Point, Luzon, and either sunk or beached and captured by the United States Army after the battle. She was salvaged and put in U.S. Navy service.
General Lezo	Spanish Navy	Spanish–American War, Battle of Manila Bay: The General Concha-class gunboat was shelled and sunk by ships of the Asiatic Squadron (United States Navy) off Sangley Point, Luzon.
George H. Sharp	United States	The tug burned at dock in Greenbush, New York and was totally destroyed.
Isla de Cuba	Spanish Navy	Isla de Cuba Spanish–American War, Battle of Manila Bay: The Isla de Luzón-class protected cruiser was shelled by ships of the Asiatic Squadron (United States Navy) and scuttled in Manila Bay to avoid capture. Later salvaged and placed in service as USS Isla de Cuba (United States Navy).
Isla de Luzón	Spanish Navy	Isla de Luzón Spanish–American War, Battle of Manila Bay: The Isla de Luzón-class protected cruiser was shelled by ships of the Asiatic Squadron (United States Navy) and scuttled in Manila Bay to avoid capture. Later salvaged and placed in service as USS Isla de Luzon (United States Navy).
Marques del Duero	Spanish Navy	Spanish–American War, Battle of Manila Bay: The Fernando el Catolico-class gunboat was shelled by ships of the Asiatic Squadron (United States Navy) and scuttled in Manila Bay to avoid capture. Later salvaged and placed in service as USS P-17 (United States Navy).
Mindanao	Spanish Navy	Spanish–American War, Battle of Manila Bay: The transport was shelled by ships of the Asiatic Squadron (United States Navy) and beached in Manila Bay to avoid sinking. She was then shelled and destroyed.
Reina Cristina	Spanish Navy	Reina Cristina Spanish–American War, Battle of Manila Bay: The Alfonso XII-class cruiser was shelled and sunk in Manila Bay by the protected cruisers USS Baltimore, USS Boston and USS Olympia (all United States Navy) with the loss of 80 of her complement including her commanding officer, Capitán de navío (Ship-of-the-Line Captain) Luis Cadarso y Rey de Andrade. Survivors were rescued by the protected cruisers Isla de Cuba and Isla de Luzón (both Spanish Navy).
Unidentified torpedo boat	Spanish Navy	Spanish–American War, Battle of Manila Bay: The torpedo boat was shelled and sunk in Manila Bay by ships of the Asiatic Squadron (United States Navy).
Velasco	Spanish Navy	Velasco Spanish–American War, Battle of Manila Bay: The Velasco-class cruiser was shelled and sunk in Manila Bay by ships of the Asiatic Squadron (United States Navy).

=== 5 May ===
List of shipwrecks: 5 May 1898
Ship	State	Description
Hereward	United Kingdom	Hereward The clipper was wrecked at Maroubra Beach, Sydney, Australia.

=== 7 May ===
List of shipwrecks: 7 May 1898
Ship	State	Description
Merksworth	New South Wales	The screw steamer was wrecked off Stockton Beach, Newcastle, New South Wales, Australia.

=== 8 May ===
List of shipwrecks: 8 May 1898
Ship	State	Description
Abernyte	United Kingdom	While carrying nitrate of soda from Caleta Buena to Falmouth, Cornwall, the barque was wrecked under Rill Head on the Lizard.
Thomas G. Smith	United States	The tow steamer lost her pilot house, filled with water, and sank during a north east gale between Fenwicks Island and Chincoteague, Virginia. The crew were rescued by the schooner Alice M. Colbourne (United States).

=== 10 May ===
List of shipwrecks: 10 May 1898
Ship	State	Description
H. W. Hills	United States	The tug sank four miles (6.4 km) south south east of Marblehead, Massachusetts.

=== 18 May ===
List of shipwrecks: 18 May 1898
Ship	State	Description
Bulgaria	United States	The steamer went ashore in fog on Gull Island in Lake Superior.
Vega	United States	The steamer went ashore in fog on Gull Island in Lake Superior.

=== 20 May ===
List of shipwrecks: 20 May 1898
Ship	State	Description
Pete Gorman	United States	The steamer rolled, filled, and sank when she was struck by City of Buffalo (United States) two miles (3.2 km) off Buffalo, New York in Lake Erie.
Sterling	United States	During a voyage from San Francisco, California, to the Bristol Bay coast of the District of Alaska with 150 Chinese cannery workers, 25 crewmen, and a cargo of cannery supplies on board, the 1,731.62-gross register ton, 208.4-foot (63.5 m) wooden ship was wrecked without loss of life on an uncharted shoal – thereafter known as Sterling Shoal (58°18′N 158°53′W) – 10 nautical miles (19 km; 12 mi) southwest by south of Cape Constantine on the coast of the District of Alaska.

=== 22 May ===
List of shipwrecks: 22 May 1898
Ship	State	Description
Helen	United States	The 27.82-ton, 45.6-foot (13.9 m) schooner suffered minor damage when she ran aground at Unalaska on Unalaska Island in the Aleutian Islands.
Jane Gray	United States	The schooner left Seattle on 18 May bound for Kotzebue Sound. Sank in the early morning 90 miles west of Cape Flattery. 34 passengers were lost, with 27 rescued.
Unidentified junk	Qing Dynasty	The junk was sunk in a collision with City of Rio Janeiro (United States) at the entrance to the harbor of Yokohama, Japan.

=== 26 May ===
List of shipwrecks: 26 May 1898
Ship	State	Description
Janie Rae	United States	The steamer struck an obstruction in the Apalachicola River below Blountstown, Florida and sank. After an attempt at raising her failed, her machinery and cabin fixtures were salvaged.
Nyanza	United Kingdom	The Newlyn fishing lugger was run ashore on Great Crebawethan, Isles of Scilly after hitting the Crims and springing a leak. The St Agnes lifeboat, James and Caroline took off four of the crew and the fifth was saved by an island boat.

=== 27 May ===
List of shipwrecks: 27 May 1898
Ship	State	Description
Alton	United States	The 84-ton schooner was lost in a gale near the mouth of Cook Inlet on the south-central coast of the District of Alaska as she departed Cook Inlet bound for Tacoma, Washington, with a crew of five on board. Her wreck was found in June.

=== 29 May ===
List of shipwrecks: 29 May 1898
Ship	State	Description
City of Worcester	United States	The steamer struck Cormorant Rock off the harbor of New London, Connecticut and was beached in Green Harbor in sinking condition.

=== 30 May ===
List of shipwrecks: 30 May 1898
Ship	State	Description
Agnes Arnold	United States	The 68-foot (21 m), 30-gross register ton steam screw tug was destroyed by fire while moored to a pier at the north end of Chambers Island in Door County, Wisconsin, at 45°11.918′N 087°21.545′W.

=== Unknown date ===
List of shipwrecks: Unknown date May 1898
Ship	State	Description
Adelaide	New South Wales	The schooner was lost with the loss of two lives after leaving Newcastle, New South Wales, Australia, carrying a load of coal on a voyage to Gisborne, New Zealand.

== June ==
=== 2 June ===
List of shipwrecks: 2 June 1898
Ship	State	Description
General	United States	The barge sank off the Aleutian Islands. Her towing vessel, Rival (United States), rescued the 12 men aboard General. The press reported on 1 September that the schooner Uranus (flag unknown) had found a wrecked barge on Unimak Island in the Aleutians with the word General marked on the bow.
George A. Upton	United States	The fishing schooner went ashore on Hay Ledge, near Carver's Harbor, Maine in a storm and went to pieces. The crew were saved.
USS Merrimac	United States Navy	USS Merrimac Spanish–American War: Siege of Santiago de Cuba: Manned by a volunteer crew attempting to sink her as a blockship in the entrance to the harbor of Santiago de Cuba on the south coast of Cuba, the collier was disabled by Spanish land-based howitzers and sunk by gunfire and torpedoes from the armored cruiser Vizcaya, cruiser Reina Mercedes, and destroyer Plutón (all Spanish Navy) in the entrance but without blocking it.

=== 3 June ===
List of shipwrecks: 3 June 1898
Ship	State	Description
Fu Ch'ing	Imperial Chinese Navy	The unprotected cruiser was wrecked in a storm at Port Arthur, China, with the loss of 180 lives. Four members of her crew survived.
Record	United States	The tug was sunk in a collision with Robert L. Fulton (United States) in a heavy rainstorm when strong current swung her in front of Robert L. Fulton at Duluth, Minnesota. Raised and repaired.

=== 4 June ===
List of shipwrecks: 4 June 1898
Ship	State	Description
Charles A. Silliman	United States	The steamer sank at dock in East Boston, Massachusetts when she got hung up on the dock on a rising tide and tipped enough to fill and sink. Raised later.
J. D. Farrell	United States	The steamer was damaged on a rock in the Box Canyon of the Kootenai River and was partially sunk. Raised and beached for repairs.

=== 6 June ===
List of shipwrecks: 6 June 1898
Ship	State	Description
Minna	United States	The steamer capsized and sank in a Gale in the Mississippi River between New Orleans, Louisiana and Vicksburg, Mississippi. Total loss.

=== 8 June ===
List of shipwrecks: 8 June 1898
Ship	State	Description
Germanic	United Kingdom	The 105.3-foot (32.1 m), 144-ton steam trawler was sunk in a collision with steam trawler Teal (United Kingdom) off Fleetwood.

=== 9 June ===
List of shipwrecks: 9 June 1898
Ship	State	Description
Ed. R. Vanburen	United States	The tug burned at the government dike at the Abbey Cut from an exploding lamp and was totally destroyed.
Mary Nixon	United Kingdom	The cargo ship collided with the steamship Curler (United Kingdom) and sank off the Shipwash Lightship ( Trinity House).. She was on a voyage from Hull, Yorkshire to London.

=== 15 June ===
List of shipwrecks: 15 June 1898
Ship	State	Description
Evelyn	United States	The catboat sank in a collision with Manhattan (United States) off Grand Street, New York in the East River.
Unnamed fishing sloop	United States	The small unnamed fishing sloop sank in a storm attempting to enter Tenant's Harbor, Maine. The crew were saved.

=== 17 June ===
List of shipwrecks: 17 June 1898
Ship	State	Description
No. 1	United States	The barge sank off the District of Alaska.

=== 18 June ===
List of shipwrecks: 18 June 1898
Ship	State	Description
Messenger	United States	The yacht sank at dock at Owensboro, Kentucky. Total loss.
Sygnet	United States	The schooner was sunk in a collision with the ferry Sappho (United States) between Bar Harbor, Maine and Mount Desert, Maine.

=== 19 June ===
List of shipwrecks: 19 June 1898
Ship	State	Description
Game Cock	United States	The schooner was sunk in a collision with Adirondack (United States) off Turkey Point, New York. Two crewmen killed.

=== 20 June ===
List of shipwrecks: 20 June 1898
Ship	State	Description
No. 5	United States	The barge sank off Cross Sound in the Alexander Archipelago in Southeast Alaska.
No. 7	United States	The barge sank off Cross Sound in the Alexander Archipelago in Southeast Alaska.

=== 21 June ===
List of shipwrecks: 21 June 1898
Ship	State	Description
Argo No. 2	United States	After breaking loose from the vessel Argo No. 1 (United States) off Dixon Entrance in Southeast Alaska, the scow foundered and broke up.
Jacob Brandow	United States	The steamer burned a dock in Southport, North Carolina.

=== 22 June ===
List of shipwrecks: 22 June 1898
Ship	State	Description
Terror	Spanish Navy	Spanish–American War: Second Battle of San Juan: The destroyer was severely damaged in combat with the auxiliary cruiser USS St. Paul (United States Navy) off San Juan, Puerto Rico, and was beached in a sinking condition on the coast of Puerto Rico. After repairs were completed on 14 September, she returned to service.

=== 25 June ===
List of shipwrecks: 25 June 1898
Ship	State	Description
Armistad	Spain	Spanish–American War: The 20-displacement ton sailing vessel – a fishing vessel with her home port at Batabanó, Cuba – was captured and destroyed by the auxiliary cruiser USS Yankee (United States Navy).
Jacinto	Spain	Spanish–American War: The 20-displacement ton sailing vessel – a fishing vessel with her home port at Batabanó, Cuba – was captured and destroyed by the auxiliary cruiser USS Yankee (United States Navy).
Luz	Spain	Spanish–American War: The 15-displacement ton sailing vessel – a fishing vessel with her home port at Batabanó, Cuba – was captured and destroyed by the auxiliary cruiser USS Yankee (United States Navy).
Mannelita	Spain	Spanish–American War: The 20-displacement ton sailing vessel – a fishing vessel with her home port at Batabanó, Cuba – was captured and destroyed by the auxiliary cruiser USS Yankee (United States Navy).
Nemesia	Spain	Spanish–American War: The 25-displacement ton sailing vessel – a fishing vessel with her home port at Batabanó, Cuba – was captured and destroyed by the auxiliary cruiser USS Yankee (United States Navy).

=== 28 June ===
List of shipwrecks: 28 June 1898
Ship	State	Description
Antonio Lopez	Spanish Navy	The wreck of Antonio Lopez Spanish–American War: Third Battle of San Juan: Pursued by the auxiliary cruiser USS Yosemite (United States Navy) while trying to run the American blockade of Puerto Rico and damaged by 5-inch (127 mm) and 6-pounder gunfire from Yosemite, the transport ran aground on a reef off Dorado, Puerto Rico, near San Juan and caught fire. She burned and was abandoned. On 15 July, the protected cruiser USS New Orleans (United States Navy) fired 20 incendiary shells into her wreck, sinking her.
Jessie	United States	While towing an unidentified barge and the barge Minerva (both United States), the 65-ton steam cargo vessel was swamped in turbulent waters and lost at the mouth of the Kuskokwim River on the coast of the District of Alaska with the loss of 18 lives. There was one survivor.
Minerva	United States	While under tow along with an unidentified barge by the steam cargo vessel Jessie (United States), the barge was swamped in turbulent waters and lost at the mouth of the Kuskokwim River on the coast of the District of Alaska.
Unidentified barge	United States	While under tow along with the barge Minerva (United States) by the steam cargo vessel Jessie (United States), the barge was swamped in turbulent waters and lost at the mouth of the Kuskokwim River on the coast of the District of Alaska.
Western Star	United States	While on a voyage from Seattle, Washington, to Saint Michael, District of Alaska, with 16 crewmen and no cargo aboard, the 718.68-gross register ton, 176.1-foot (53.7 m) river steamer was wrecked on a reef in Katmai Bay (57°58′N 154°57′W) after losing her ground tackle during a gale. The tug Resolute (United States) came to her assistance, but she was on the reef before Resolute could intervene. All on board Western Star survived.

=== 29 June ===
List of shipwrecks: 29 June 1898
Ship	State	Description
Arayat	Spanish Navy	Spanish–American War: The Arayat-class gunboat was scuttled in the Pasig River, Luzon, Philippines to prevent capture. Raised, repaired and put in United States Navy service in October 1899.

=== 30 June ===
List of shipwrecks: 30 June 1898
Ship	State	Description
Centinela	Spanish Navy	Spanish–American War: First Battle of Manzanillo: Damaged by gunfire while in action with the gunboats USS Hist and USS Hornet (both United States Navy), the gunboat was beached on the coast of Cuba in or near Niguero Bay. She was repaired and returned to service.

=== Unknown date ===
List of shipwrecks: Unknown date June 1898
Ship	State	Description
Acceptor	United Kingdom	The steam trawler was sunk in a collision in the Bunbeg River, County Donegal, United Kingdom.
International	Unknown	While under tow by the vessel Connemaugh (flag unknown) from Vancouver, British Columbia, to the District of Alaska, the river steamer broke loose from her towline and sank sometime prior to reaching the Bering Sea.
Unidentified barge	Unknown	While under tow by the vessel Connemaugh (flag unknown) from Vancouver, British Columbia, to the District of Alaska, the barge broke loose from her towline and sank sometime prior to reaching the Bering Sea.

== July ==
=== 2 July ===
List of shipwrecks: 2 July 1898
Ship	State	Description
Argo No. 2	United States	The river steamer broke up in a heavy southeast gale, probably between Washington and the District of Alaska.
International	United States	The steamer, without boilers or engines, sank in a gale off Unimak Pass, District of Alaska. The crew were rescued by the tug Conemaugh (United States) that had been towing her.
J. Eppinger	United States	The schooner was sunk in a collision with Columbia (United States) 45 miles (72 km) north west of Point Reyes in thick fog. Total loss.
J. E. Pratt	United States	The pleasure steamer burned off Van Wies Point, totally destroyed.
Moonlight	United States	With 42 passengers aboard, the 71-ton schooner was wrecked without loss of life on a small island 20 nautical miles (37 km; 23 mi) from the mouth of the Kobuk River in the District of Alaska.
Rosario	United States	Ice driven by a gale crushed the 148-gross register ton, 99-foot (30.2 m) whaling schooner in the Chukchi Sea on the coast of the District of Alaska 0.75 nautical miles (1.39 km; 0.86 mi) south of Point Barrow. Her crew of 26 survived.

=== 3 July ===
List of shipwrecks: 3 July 1898
Ship	State	Description
Almirante Oquendo	Spanish Navy	Almirante Oquendo Spanish–American War, Battle of Santiago de Cuba: The Infanta Maria Teresa-class armored cruiser was beached and wrecked on the south coast of Cuba west of Santiago de Cuba after suffering heavy damage from gunfire from the ships of the North Atlantic Squadron (United States Navy).
Cristóbal Colón	Spanish Navy	Cristóbal Colón Spanish–American War, Battle of Santiago de Cuba: The Giuseppe Garibaldi-class armored cruiser was beached and wrecked at the mouth of the Tarquino River on the south coast of Cuba after suffering heavy damage from gunfire from the ships of the North Atlantic Squadron (United States Navy).
Furor	Spanish Navy	Spanish–American War, Battle of Santiago de Cuba: The Furor-class destroyer was beached, exploded, and sank with the loss of her commanding officer and over half her crew just west of Cabanas Bay, Cuba, during the Battle of Santiago de Cuba after suffering heavy damage from gunfire from the ships of the North Atlantic Squadron (United States Navy).
Infanta Maria Teresa	Spanish Navy	Infanta Maria Teresa Spanish–American War, Battle of Santiago de Cuba: The Infanta Maria Teresa-class armored cruiser was beached and wrecked just west of Punta Cabrera, Cuba, after suffering heavy damage from gunfire from the ships of the North Atlantic Squadron (United States Navy).
Plutón	Spanish Navy	Spanish–American War, Battle of Santiago de Cuba: The Audaz-class destroyer was beached and wrecked just west of Cabanas Bay, Cuba, after suffering heavy damage from gunfire from the ships of the North Atlantic Squadron (United States Navy).
Vizcaya	Spanish Navy	Vizcaya Spanish–American War, Battle of Santiago de Cuba: The Infanta Maria Teresa-class armored cruiser was beached and wrecked on the south coast of Cuba west of Santiago de Cuba after suffering heavy damage from gunfire from the ships of the North Atlantic Squadron (United States Navy).

=== 4 July ===
List of shipwrecks: 4 July 1898
Ship	State	Description
Alfred J. Beach	United States	While under tow from Vancouver, British Columbia, to St. Michael, District of Alaska, by the steam schooner Noyo (United States), the river steamer sank in the North Pacific Ocean 250 nautical miles (460 km; 290 mi) off Dixon Entrance.
Bessie	United States	The steamer burned at dock in Montgomery, Georgia, total loss.
Kate Spencer	United States	The steamer was wrecked on the Sapelo Island Bar, breaking in two, a total loss.
La Bourgogne	France	The passenger ship collided with Cromartyshire (United Kingdom) 5 nautical miles (9.3 km) in thick fog off Sable Island, Nova Scotia and sank with the loss of 562 of the 725 people on board. See: Sinking of SS La Bourgogne
Surf City	United States	The steamer capsized and sank during a heavy squall between Salem Willows and Beverly, Massachusetts. Eight passengers were killed.
William Hinds	United States	The laid up tow steamer burned at Calais, Maine, total loss.

=== 5 July ===
List of shipwrecks: 5 July 1898
Ship	State	Description
Alfonso XII	Spanish Navy	Spanish–American War: Bound from Cádiz, Spain, to Havana, Cuba, with a 6,000-ton cargo of provisions, guns, and ammunition, the 5,063-displacement ton armed transport was destroyed on the coast of Cuba by the gunboat USS Castine and patrol yacht USS Hawk (both United States Navy).
Reina Mercedes	Spanish Navy	Reina Mercedes Spanish–American War: Siege of Santiago de Cuba: The Alfonso XII-class cruiser was scuttled at Santiago de Cuba, Cuba. Later salvaged by the Americans, repaired and entered service as USS Reina Mercedes (United States Navy).

=== 8 July ===
List of shipwrecks: 8 July 1898
Ship	State	Description
Delaware	United States	During a voyage from New York City to Charleston, South Carolina, with cargo and 32 passengers aboard, the 1,646 GRT Clyde Line wooden steamer caught fire at about 9:20 p.m. off Barnegat, New Jersey. The ship was abandoned and survivors headed to shore aboard four lifeboats and a raft. A lifeboat of the United States Life-Saving Service met two of the lifeboats and the raft and took them to shore after daylight. Another lifeboat load was rescued by the fishing smack S. B. Miller (flag unknown), and the fourth lifeboat load was rescued by the tug Storm King (United States). Delaware burned to the waterline and sank on 9 July.
Raymond	United States	The steamer struck a snag and sank in the Salt River in Kentucky. She was raised and repaired.
Salvation	United States	The steamer burned and sank on the Crooked River in Florida. She was declared a total loss.

=== 9 July ===
List of shipwrecks: 9 July 1898
Ship	State	Description
Ida Jane	United States	The schooner lost her steering as she was about to enter the harbor at White River, Michigan on Lake Michigan and went ashore. Refloated by the United States Life Saving Service, but sprung a leak and had to be beached on a sand bar to prevent sinking.

=== 10 July ===
List of shipwrecks: 10 July 1898
Ship	State	Description
J. K. Graves	United States	The steamer was swamped and sunk by high waves caused by high winds while laying at the bank at Cairo, Illinois. Raised and repaired.

=== 12 July ===
List of shipwrecks: 12 July 1898
Ship	State	Description
Regulator	United States	Regulator The sternwheel paddle steamer struck a rock and sank in the Columbia River in Oregon just downstream from the Cascades Rapids with 160 passengers on board. There were no fatalities. She was eventually refloated, repaired, and returned to service.
Santo Domingo	Spain	Spanish–American War: Pursued by the gunboat USS Eagle (United States Navy) while trying to run the United States Navy blockade of Cuba, the 5,000-displacement ton armed steamer took a number of 6-pounder shell hits from Eagle and ran aground on the southwest coast of Cuba on the point of a spit 2 nautical miles (3.7 km; 2.3 mi) east1/2 south of Punta Piedras. After the 66 men on board Santo Domingo fled aboard an unidentified sidewheel river paddle steamer, a boat crew from Eagle boarded Santo Domingo, shot livestock that they found aboard her, and set her on fire. She burned for at least a week, and the fire thoroughly destroyed her.

=== 13 July ===
List of shipwrecks: 13 July 1898
Ship	State	Description
Josefita	Spain	Spanish–American War: The armed tug USRC Hudson ( United States Revenue Cutter Service) captured the fishing sloop off Cárdenas, Cuba, and destroyed her.
Regulator	United States	The steamer was driven by wind and currents on rocks at the lower entrance to the Cascade Locks and was sunk.

=== 15 July ===
List of shipwrecks: 15 July 1898
Ship	State	Description
Lela	United States	The ferry sprung a leak and sank while laying at the bank at Columbus, Kentucky. Total loss.

=== 16 July ===
List of shipwrecks: 16 July 1898
Ship	State	Description
Elizabeth Latham	United Kingdom	The 63-ton schooner was sunk in a collision with Chancellor (United Kingdom) in the Crosby Channel near the Crosby Lightship.
Northampton	United States	The steamer burned at dock in Norfolk, Virginia. Total loss. One crewman killed.

=== 17 July ===
List of shipwrecks: 17 July 1898
Ship	State	Description
Mable Lane	United States	While under tow by the vessel South Portland (United States) from Dutch Harbor to St. Michael, District of Alaska, the river steamer sank in the Bering Sea after her towline parted in a gale.

=== 18 July ===
List of shipwrecks: 18 July 1898
Ship	State	Description
Cuba Española	Spanish Navy	Spanish–American War: Third Battle of Manzanillo: The gunboat was destroyed in the harbor at Manzanillo, Cuba, by the gunboats USS Helena, USS Hist, and USS Hornet and the armed tug USS Wompatuck (all United States Navy).
Delgado Parejo	Spanish Navy	Spanish–American War: Third Battle of Manzanillo: The gunboat was destroyed in the harbor at Manzanillo, Cuba, by the gunboats USS Helena, USS Hist, and USS Hornet and the armed tug USS Wompatuck (all United States Navy).
Dubuque	United States	The steamer was pushed by a sudden squall into the pier of the Chicago and North Western Railway Bridge at Winona, Minnesota, knocking a hole in her hull. She was beached in five feet (1.5 m) of water. The hole was patched, she was pumped out and taken to Eagle Point, Iowa for repairs.
Estrella	Spanish Navy	Spanish–American War: Third Battle of Manzanillo: The gunboat was destroyed in the harbor at Manzanillo, Cuba, by the gunboats USS Helena, USS Hist, and USS Hornet and the armed tug USS Wompatuck (all United States Navy).
Gloria	Spain	Spanish–American War: Third Battle of Manzanillo: The steamer was destroyed in the harbor at Manzanillo, Cuba, by the gunboats USS Helena and USS Wilmington (both United States Navy).
Guantánamo	Spanish Navy	Spanish–American War: Third Battle of Manzanillo: The gunboat was destroyed in the harbor at Manzanillo, Cuba, by the gunboats USS Helena, USS Hist, and USS Hornet and the armed tug USS Wompatuck (all United States Navy).
Guardián	Spanish Navy	Spanish–American War: Third Battle of Manzanillo: The gunboat was destroyed in the harbor at Manzanillo, Cuba, by the gunboats USS Helena, USS Hist, and USS Hornet and the armed tug USS Wompatuck (all United States Navy), or forced to run aground. Later refloated, repaired and placed in Cuban Coast Guard service as Ignacio Agramonte.
Jose Garcia	Spain	Spanish–American War: Third Battle of Manzanillo: The steamer was destroyed in the harbor at Manzanillo, Cuba, by the gunboats USS Helena and USS Wilmington (both United States Navy).
Maria	Spanish Navy	Spanish–American War: Third Battle of Manzanillo: The armed hulk, serving as a stationary pontoon, was destroyed in the harbor at Manzanillo, Cuba, by the gunboat USS Wilmington (United States Navy).
Purissima Concepción	Spain	Spanish–American War: Third Battle of Manzanillo: The steamer – a blockade runner – was destroyed in the harbor at Manzanillo, Cuba, by the gunboats USS Helena and USS Wilmington (both United States Navy).

=== 20 July ===
List of shipwrecks: 20 July 1898
Ship	State	Description
Wendouree	New South Wales	The steam passenger ship was wrecked on the Oyster Bank at the mouth of the Hunter River at Newcastle, New South Wales, Australia.

=== 21 July ===
List of shipwrecks: 21 July 1898
Ship	State	Description
Baracoa	Spanish Navy	Spanish–American War, Battle of Nipe Bay: The gunboat was scuttled by her crew upriver from Nipe Bay, Cuba, to prevent her capture by a United States Navy squadron. Later raised, repaired and placed in Cuban Navy service.
Jorge Juan	Spanish Navy	Jorge Juan Spanish–American War, Battle of Nipe Bay: The Jorge Juan-class sloop-of-war was sunk in Nipe Bay, Cuba, by gunfire from the armed yacht USS Wasp, armed tug USS Leyden, and gunboat USS Annapolis (all United States Navy).

=== 23 July ===
List of shipwrecks: 23 July 1898
Ship	State	Description
Mono	United Kingdom	While under tow along with the sternwheel paddle steamer Stikine Chief (United Kingdom) from Wrangell to Saint Michael in the District of Alaska by the vessel Fastnet (flag unknown), the steamer broke loose from her towline in the Clarence Strait in the Alexander Archipelago in Southeast Alaska, drifted onto rocks at the southeast end of Bushy Island (56°16′N 132°59′W), and was wrecked. On 1 August, Fastnet would also lose Stikine Chief in the Gulf of Alaska due to a broken towline.

=== 24 July ===
List of shipwrecks: 24 July 1898
Ship	State	Description
Edward Smith No. 2	United States	The steamer was sunk when she sheared off course and was struck by the barge Aurania (United States) in Lake St. Clair.
James Eva	United States	The river steamer was abandoned in a gale and burned, probably between Washington and the District of Alaska.

=== 26 July ===
List of shipwrecks: 26 July 1898
Ship	State	Description
Frank Preston	United States	The tow steamer sprung a leak and sank over night at dock at Stewart's Landing, Kentucky. Raised, taken to Ludlow, Kentucky and was broken up.

=== 27 July ===
List of shipwrecks: 27 July 1898
Ship	State	Description
HDMS Absalon	Royal Danish Navy	The schooner was torpedoed by HDMS Søbjørnen (Royal Danish Navy) and was beached. Subsequently repaired and returned to service.
No. 6	United States	The barge sank near Dutch Harbor, District of Alaska.

=== 28 July ===
List of shipwrecks: 28 July 1898
Ship	State	Description
Baby	United States	The launch was sunk in a collision with J. S. Worden (United States) in Newark Bay at the Lehigh Valley Railroad Bridge. Two crewmen were killed, one was rescued by J. S. Worden.
No. 8	United States	The barge sank near Dutch Harbor, District of Alaska.
Phoenix	United States	The tug struck rocks near Hog's Back while going through Hell Gate and sank in eight feet (2.4 m) of water.

=== 29 July ===
List of shipwrecks: 29 July 1898
Ship	State	Description
HM Torpedo Boat 28	Royal Navy	The TB 26-class torpedo boat was stranded at Kalk Bay on the coast of South Africa near Cape Town. She was salvaged but did not return to service, and was sunk as a target in December.

=== 30 July ===
List of shipwrecks: 30 July 1898
Ship	State	Description
Bella Mac	United States	The passenger steamer sank in Sawyers Bend, St. Louis Harbor. Total loss.
Sea Bird	United States	The schooner went ashore on Nauset Beach. Refloated by the United States Life Saving Service, but sprung a leak and sank the next day. Refloated again on 6 August and sailed to Provincetown, Massachusetts.

=== 31 July ===
List of shipwrecks: 31 July 1898
Ship	State	Description
Lapérouse	French Navy	The cruiser was wrecked without loss of life at Anosy, Madagascar, during a storm.

== August ==
=== 1 August ===
List of shipwrecks: 1 August 1898
Ship	State	Description
Stikine Chief	United Kingdom	While under tow from Wrangell to Saint Michael in the District of Alaska by the vessel Fastnet (flag unknown), the sternwheel paddle steamer broke loose from her towline in rough weather in the Gulf of Alaska between Cross Point and Kodiak and broke up off Yakutat. The steamer Dora (flag unknown) discovered her wreck floating 75 nautical miles (139 km; 86 mi) off Kodiak on 5 August and rescued a dog from it, but found no sign of her crew. Fastnet had also lost the steamer Mono (United Kingdom), in tow along with Stikine Chief, due to a broken towline on 23 July.

=== 2 August ===
List of shipwrecks: 2 August 1898
Ship	State	Description
Lalulula	Spain	Spanish–American War: Pursued by the gunboat USS Bancroft (United States Navy) during a voyage from Batabanó to Bailén, Cuba, with a cargo of green corn, the 20-displacement ton sailing vessel was scuttled and abandoned.

=== 3 August ===
List of shipwrecks: 3 August 1898
Ship	State	Description
City of Astoria	United States	While towing a barge, the 56.47-gross register ton, 72-foot (21.9 m) towing steamer struck a submerged rock 250 feet (76 m) off Taiya Sahnka near Sullivan Island in Lynn Canal in Southeast Alaska, then rolled off the rock and sank when heavy weather struck. Later raised and taken to Skagway, Alaska for repairs.
Olivette	United States	The steamer sank at anchor in Fernandina, Florida. Later raised.
William J. Keyser	United States	The tugboat foundered 15–20 nautical miles (28–37 km; 17–23 mi) off Point St. Joseph, Florida. Four of the 13 crew were lost.

=== 4 August ===
List of shipwrecks: 4 August 1898
Ship	State	Description
Ethelyn	United States	The sloop yacht ran aground on the south side bar of the channel into Corson Inlet. She was pounded by wind and heavy seas and washed over the bar into a slue. Total loss.
Josephine	Spain	Spanish–American War: During a voyage from Batabanó, Cuba, to Nueva Gerona on the Isle of Pines, the 10-displacement ton sailing vessel was captured and destroyed by the gunboat USS Bancroft (United States Navy).

=== 7 August ===
List of shipwrecks: 7 August 1898
Ship	State	Description
Ciudado de Sagua	Spain	Spanish–American War: The torpedo boat USS Cushing (United States Navy) captured the 4-displacement ton sailing vessel at Sagua La Grande, Cuba, and destroyed her.
Freo Juanitas	Spain	Spanish–American War: The torpedo boat USS McKee (United States Navy) captured the 4-displacement ton sailing vessel at Sagua La Grande, Cuba, and destroyed her.
Guardian	United States	The 1,124-ton, 173-foot (52.7 m) bark struck a reef and sank north of "Sigalda Island" –probably Tigalda Island – in the Aleutian Islands near Unalaska on Unalaska Island. All 18 people aboard – one passenger and 17 crew members – survived, some of them rescued by the ship Amphion (United Kingdom).
Nabiero	Spain	Spanish–American War: The torpedo boat USS Cushing (United States Navy) captured the 4-displacement ton sailing vessel at Sagua La Grande, Cuba, and destroyed her.
Pensamiento	Spain	Spanish–American War: The torpedo boat USS Cushing (United States Navy) captured the 4-displacement ton sailing vessel at Sagua La Grande, Cuba, and destroyed her.
S. F. 22	Spain	Spanish–American War: The torpedo boat USS Cushing (United States Navy) captured the 4-displacement ton sailing vessel at Sagua La Grande, Cuba, and destroyed her.

=== 8 August ===
List of shipwrecks: 8 August 1898
Ship	State	Description
Blanco	Spain	Spanish–American War: The torpedo boat USS McKee (United States Navy) captured the 4-displacement ton sailing vessel at Sagua La Grande, Cuba, and destroyed her.
Vivero Lorenzo	Spain	Spanish–American War: The torpedo boat USS McKee (United States Navy) captured the 4-displacement ton sailing vessel at Sagua La Grande, Cuba, and destroyed her.

=== 10 August ===
List of shipwrecks: 10 August 1898
Ship	State	Description
S. G. Hart	United States	The schooner went ashore three-quarters mile (1.2 km) north east of the Little Kinnakeet, North Carolina Life Saving Station and was wrecked. All eight crew rescued by the United States Life Saving Service.
Wahneta	United States	The sloop yacht was sunk in a collision with Gov. Andrew (United States) in The Narrows of Boston Harbor.

=== 11 August ===
List of shipwrecks: 11 August 1898
Ship	State	Description
Joven Genaro	Spain	Spanish–American War: The torpedo boats USS Gwin and USS McKee (both United States Navy) captured the 20-displacement ton sailing vessel in the Bay of Cárdenas on the coast of Cuba and destroyed her.

=== 12 August ===
List of shipwrecks: 12 August 1898
Ship	State	Description
Eva	United States	The steamer sank in a gale at Apalachicola, Florida. Raised and repaired.
Hudson Pet	United States	The steamer sank in a gale at Apalachicola, Florida. Raised and repaired.
Ocean Gem	United States	The steamer sank in a gale at Apalachicola, Florida. Raised and repaired.

=== 14 August ===
List of shipwrecks: 14 August 1898
Ship	State	Description
USS Mangrove	United States Navy	The armed supply ship ran aground outside the harbor at Caibarién, Cuba. She quickly refloated herself and resumed operations.

=== 16 August ===
List of shipwrecks: 16 August 1898
Ship	State	Description
R. F. Goodman	United States	The tow steamer burned off Lester Park in Lake Superior. Total loss.

=== 17 August ===
List of shipwrecks: 17 August 1898
Ship	State	Description
Decorra	United States	The schooner stranded on Black Head four and a half miles (7.2 km) east north east of the Crumple Island Life saving Station. Her crew refloated her, but was leaking badly and in danger of sinking. She was towed to Jonesport, Maine and beached.

=== 19 August ===
List of shipwrecks: 19 August 1898
Ship	State	Description
Louise J. Kenny	United States	With a crew of nine and a cargo of 20 tons of lumber, machinery, and general merchandise aboard, the 155-net register ton, 96.8-foot (29.5 m) schooner dragged her anchor in a gale in the Chukchi Sea and was wrecked without loss of life on the coast of the District of Alaska on the south side of Point Hope.

=== 20 August ===
List of shipwrecks: 20 August 1898
Ship	State	Description
Coquette	France	The steam fishing schooner was sunk in a collision with the ocean liner Norge (Denmark) on the Grand Banks in fog at (46°00′N 48°00′W). 16 crew killed, her captain and eight others were saved.
Ruth	United States	The sailboat was sunk in a collision with the yacht Manila (United States) off Yonkers, New York.
Toledo	United Kingdom	The 2,843-ton Sunderland steamer hit Steeple Rock, in the Isles of Scilly and ripped open her hull. Her crew managed to lower the ship's boats and escape before she sank in twenty-five fathoms.
W. J. Bryan	United States	The steamer sprung a leak and sank near Elgin Landing, Arkansas in the Black River. One crewman drowned after refusing to enter lifeboat.

=== 21 August ===
List of shipwrecks: 21 August 1898
Ship	State	Description
Spitfire	Queensland	The 19-metre (62 ft) fishing vessel developed a leak and foundered off Cape York, Queensland. Crew rescued by "Omi Maru" (Japan). Wreck discovered on 21 August, 2024.

=== 22 August ===
List of shipwrecks: 22 August 1898
Ship	State	Description
Kate	New South Wales	The steam tug sank off Garden Island, New South Wales, Australia, after colliding with the passenger ferry Narrabeen (New South Wales). Narrabeen rescued everyone on board. Kate later was refloated, repaired, and returned to service.
Oakland	New South Wales	The passenger cargo ship ran aground on the bar at Ballina, New South Wales, Australia. She was refloated, repaired, and returned to service.

=== 23 August ===
List of shipwrecks: 23 August 1898
Ship	State	Description
Henry E. Bishop	United States	The steamer burned at dock in Tottenville, New York on Staten Island. total loss.
Seaboard	United States	The row steamer burned at dock in Pilot Town, Florida in the St. Johns River. Total loss.

=== 24 August ===
List of shipwrecks: 24 August 1898
Ship	State	Description
George Wood	United States	The tow steamer burned to the waterline and sank in the harbor of Coal Grove, Ohio.

=== 26 August ===
List of shipwrecks: 26 August 1898
Ship	State	Description
Actress	United States	The schooner sprung a leak and sank 29 miles (47 km) south east of Brenton Point. The crew escaped in lifeboats.
Torpedo boat No. 5	Royal Danish Navy	The torpedo boat was rammed and sunk in the Øresund by the steamship Doktor Siegler (Germany) with the loss of a crew member.

=== 28 August ===
List of shipwrecks: 28 August 1898
Ship	State	Description
F. Fitch	United States	The schooner was damaged in a collision with a steam barge three miles (4.8 km) south west of Point Betsie, Michigan Life Saving Station in Lake Michigan. She sank four hours later five miles (8.0 km) south west of the station. The crew, the captain and his son, escaped on a scow, and were rescued by the United States Life Saving Service.
Superior	United States	The steamer was wrecked on Gull Island, Michigan.

=== 30 August ===
List of shipwrecks: 30 August 1898
Ship	State	Description
Saint Marc	France	The steamer was wrecked at Pedra do Sal, Santa Mariña, Galicia, Spain en route from Le Havre to Lisbon, Portugal.

=== 31 August ===
List of shipwrecks: 31 August 1898
Ship	State	Description
Olivette	United States Army	The hospital ship sank in 20 or 30 feet (6.1 or 9.1 m) of water while coaling in rough weather off the Quarantine Station at Fernandina, Florida. Refloated, repaired, and returned to commercial service.

=== Unknown date ===
List of shipwrecks: Unknown date August 1898
Ship	State	Description
Pizarro	Spanish Navy	Spanish–American War: The Hernan Cortez-class gunboat was scuttled by being blown up by her crew at Nuevitas, Cuba, when American forces captured Nuevitas.
Salve Maria	Spain	Spanish–American War: Captured by the gunboat USS Hornet (United States Navy) during a voyage from Batabanó, Cuba, on 6 August, the sailing vessel was wrecked on a reef off Sand Key Light southwest of Key West, Florida.

== September ==
=== 3 September ===
List of shipwrecks: 3 September 1898
Ship	State	Description
Fleur-de-Lis	United States	The steamer burned in the Delaware River above Delaware City, Delaware during a thunder storm when her master dropped a lamp when stunned by a lightning strike. The ship was totally destroyed.
Lindia M. Newlin	United States	The tug burned in the Albany, New York area and was totally destroyed.
Orlinda	United States	The steamer grounded on the bar at the mouth of the San Bernard River and broke up over night. Total loss.

=== 5 September ===
List of shipwrecks: 5 September 1898
Ship	State	Description
Kanapaha	United States	The yacht was wrecked off the coast of Cuba. Total loss.
Lewiston	United States	The steamer ran aground on the breakwater at Point Judith, Rhode Island. 149 passengers, (sick soldiers, nurses, and doctors), plus her crew of 52 taken off and she was pulled off by a tug. She was leaking badly and was beached. Refloated on 8 or 9 September and towed to Boston, Massachusetts, or Providence, Rhode Island, for repairs.

=== 7 September ===
List of shipwrecks: 7 September 1898
Ship	State	Description
Embla	United States	The yacht was scuttled in the harbor of Stamford, Connecticut after she caught fire from a naptha explosion. Later raised. One crewman died of burns.
Minnie	United States	The schooner went ashore at Port Austin, Michigan in high winds and was pounded to pieces. The United States Life Saving Service assisted in stripping the wreck.
Wenona	United States	The schooner went ashore when her tow steamer made a navigational error in Lake Superior while trying to enter the Michigan Ship Channel. She was grounded where she could not be pulled off. Remains of the wreck were blown up during widening of the canal in 1935.

=== 11 September ===
List of shipwrecks: 11 September 1898
Ship	State	Description
Dart	United States	The pleasure steamer struck an obstruction and sank near Culloms, Ohio in the Ohio River. Raised and repaired.

=== 13 September ===
List of shipwrecks: 13 September 1898
Ship	State	Description
Hattie Belle	United States	The steamer struck a rock at the lower entrance to the Cascade Locks and was sunk.

=== 16 September ===
List of shipwrecks: 16 September 1898
Ship	State	Description
Alice C. Jordan	United States	The schooner was sunk in a collision with Gloucester (United States) in Vineyard Sound. Nine crewmen were killed, seven rescued by Gloucester.

=== 17 September ===
List of shipwrecks: 17 September 1898
Ship	State	Description
Hoag	United States	The steamer struck a rock at the lower entrance to the Oregon City Locks and was sunk.

=== 18 September ===
List of shipwrecks: 18 September 1898
Ship	State	Description
Fritz Reuter	Norway	The full-rigged ship was abandoned in the Atlantic Ocean. She was on a voyage from Mobile, Alabama, United States to Greenock, Renfrewshire, United Kingdom.

=== 19 September ===
List of shipwrecks: 19 September 1898
Ship	State	Description
Colorado	United States	The cargo ship stranded on Eagle River Reef on Lake Superior after hitting the prop of a submerged wreck in smoky weather. Broke up in a storm on 24 September.
Eugene	United States	The steamer swamped and sank in seven feet (2.1 m) of water two miles (3.2 km) from dock in Galveston, Texas. Raised later.
Fanny T.	United States	The fishing schooner capsized and sank off Nahant, Massachusetts. One of the three crew died.
Keystone	United States	The cargo ship/steam barge burned off Summer Island in Lake Michigan. Total loss.
Mediator	United States	The schooner went ashore one mile (1.6 km) west of the mouth of the Gratiot River. Her cargo was salvaged and she was pulled off on 26 September and taken to Houghton, Michigan where she was abandoned, a total loss.

=== 20 September ===
List of shipwrecks: 20 September 1898
Ship	State	Description
Harriet S. Jackson	United States	The schooner went ashore on Pollock Rip Shoal. She was refloated in two hours but was leaking badly and ran aground again in a failed attempt to beach her. She filled and sank, a total loss.
Maud Preston	United States	The steamer burned to the waterline in Maumee Bay.

=== 21 September ===
List of shipwrecks: 21 September 1898
Ship	State	Description
Tell City	United States	The steamer struck an old lock gate and sank in the Louisville and Portland Canal. Raised and repaired.

=== 22 September ===
List of shipwrecks: 22 September 1898
Ship	State	Description
Ira O. Smith	United States	The tug burned in Lake Michigan between the Chicago River and the Lake View Water Works, Chicago.
Oliver Eldridge	United States	The fishing schooner went ashore at St. Peter's Island, Cape Breton, Nova Scotia. The crew were saved.

=== 24 September ===
List of shipwrecks: 24 September 1898
Ship	State	Description
Unison	United States	The schooner went ashore near Odiorne Point. She broke up, a total loss.

=== 26 September ===
List of shipwrecks: 26 September 1898
Ship	State	Description
Uto	Norway	The steamer went ashore six miles (9.7 km) north of the Fort Lauderdale, Florida Life Saving Station. She was refloated on 6 October and went to Key West, Florida.

=== 27 September ===
List of shipwrecks: 27 September 1898
Ship	State	Description
Martha Jane	United States	The fishing schooner dragged ashore at Auld's Cove, in the Straits of Canso. The crew were saved.

=== Unknown date ===
List of shipwrecks: Unknown date September 1898
Ship	State	Description
Hattie	United States	The 84-gross register ton barge was stranded at the Sabine Pass Lighthouse on the coast of Louisiana across Sabine Pass from Sabine Pass, Texas. The only person on board survived.

== October ==
=== 1 October ===
List of shipwrecks: 1 October 1898
Ship	State	Description
C. and E. Lenox	United States	The steamer burned to the waterline at dock at Pier 7, Port Richmond, Philadelphia.

=== 2 October ===
List of shipwrecks: 2 October 1898
Ship	State	Description
Gertie Evlyn	United States	The fishing schooner sprang a leak and sank two days later (Not clear if leak occurred on 30 September or 2 October). Crew saved by Ellie G. King.
Wandering Jew	United States	The barkentine sprung a leak during a severe hurricane and went ashore and sank 11 miles (18 km) south east of the Sullivan's Island, South Carolina Life Saving Station. The crew were rescued by the tug John Harlin (United States).

=== 3 October ===
List of shipwrecks: 3 October 1898
Ship	State	Description
City of Detroit	United States	The tug was sunk at dock when struck by Alva B. (United States) in the Cuyahoga River. Later raised.
Crocodile	United States	The sloop yacht went ashore one-half mile (0.80 km) east south east of the Quonochontaug, Rhode Island Life Saving Station in thick fog. The two crewmen on board were rescued by the United States Life Saving Service. She broke up, a total loss. Some furniture and $800 in lead ballast were salvaged.

=== 4 October ===
List of shipwrecks: 4 October 1898
Ship	State	Description
Bessie Maud	(United Kingdom) New South Wales	The schooner Bessie Maud crossed the bow of the steamship Virawa in the Port of Newcastle, New South Wales. The steamship struck the schooner, which sank with no loss of life.
Pewaukee	United States	The steamer sprung a leak 24 miles (39 km) north of Chicago, Illinois. She was towed to Chicago where she sank.
Walkatomica	United States	The steamer burned and sank at Milton, Florida. Total loss.

=== 7 October ===
List of shipwrecks: 7 October 1898
Ship	State	Description
Lena Archer	United States	The tow steamer struck an obstruction and sank in the Rough River between Hartford, Kentucky and Livermore, Kentucky. Total loss.
Pilot	United States	The tow steamer struck rocks in the Upper Rapids of the Mississippi River and sank in 4 1/2 feet (1.4 m) of water. Raised, and repaired at Le Claire, Iowa.

=== 9 October ===
List of shipwrecks: 9 October 1898
Ship	State	Description
Dotterell	United Kingdom	The vessel was sunk in 30 fathoms (180 ft; 55 m) of water after a collision with Industry (United Kingdom) about 3/4 mile (1.2 km) west of Danger Patch Buoy near Morecambe Bay; her crew was rescued by Industry.

=== 11 October ===
List of shipwrecks: 11 October 1898
Ship	State	Description
Sallie	United States	The steamer was sunk in a collision with Hampton Roads (United States) in Hampton Roads.

=== 12 October ===
List of shipwrecks: 12 October 1898
Ship	State	Description
Helen	United States	The steamer burned to the waterline at dock over night and sank at Leesburg, Louisiana.

=== 13 October ===
List of shipwrecks: 13 October 1898
Ship	State	Description
Cyrus Chamberlain	United States	The lime schooner's cargo caught fire in the harbor of Portsmouth, New Hampshire while anchored off Clarks Island. She was run aground on flats on 14 October and stripped of useful items.
Brixham	United States	While on a voyage from Seattle, Washington, to Dyea and Skagway, District of Alaska, with 18 passengers, a crew of 42, and a 240-ton cargo consisting mostly of cattle, hogs, and sheep, the 626.68-gross register ton, 183-foot (55.8 m) steamer was wrecked on the southeast end of Blashke Island (56°07′N 132°54′W) in Clarence Strait near Zarembo Island in the Alexander Archipelago in Southeast Alaska. She broke up during a heavy gale on 15 December. The ship and her cargo were lost, but her passengers and crew survived.
Hattie Belle	United States	The steamer struck a rock at the lower entrance to the Cascade Locks and was sunk.

=== 14 October ===
List of shipwrecks: 14 October 1898
Ship	State	Description
Mohegan	United Kingdom	Mohegan The steamer ran aground on The Manacles, off The Lizard, Cornwall with the loss of 106 lives.

=== 15 October ===
List of shipwrecks: 15 October 1898
Ship	State	Description
Mary E. Bennett	United States	The tow steamer struck a snag and sank in the Missouri River near Cooks Landing, Nebraska. Total loss.

=== 16 October ===
List of shipwrecks: 16 October 1898
Ship	State	Description
Horace A. Tuttle	United States	The steamer struck the bottom of the harbor at Michigan City, Indiana and drifted into a pier, resulting in a total loss.

=== 17 October ===
List of shipwrecks: 17 October 1898
Ship	State	Description
E. F. Gould	United States	The steamer was beached at Au Sable, Michigan on Lake Huron after being caught at dock in a gale to save her from being beaten to pieces.

=== 18 October ===
List of shipwrecks: 18 October 1898
Ship	State	Description
Annie Dall	United States	While at Jacksonport, Wisconsin, with a cargo consisting of a steam pump and either firewood or maple wood, the 110.9-foot (33.8 m), 149.53-gross register ton two-masted schooner broke loose from her moorings during a gale and ran aground without loss of life. Pulled off the beach on 21 October, she became waterlogged, capsized 1 nautical mile (1.9 km; 1.2 mi) offshore, was abandoned, and drifted back onto the beach at 44°58.411′N 087°10.878′W, a total loss. The steam pump was salvaged in March 1899.
G. W. Shaver	United States	The steamer was sunk in a collision with T. J. Potter (United States) in fog near Martins Island in the Columbia River.
John Jewett	United States	The lumber schooner was wrecked in Grace Harbor, Michigan in a gale.

=== 20 October ===
List of shipwrecks: 20 October 1898
Ship	State	Description
Henry Chisholm	United States	The wreck of Henry Chisholm, ca. 2008. The cargo steamer ran aground on a reef in Lake Superior off Rock of Ages Light, Isle Royale, without loss of life. She broke up and sank during a storm on 27 October.
L. P. Smith	United States	The tow steamer rolled over and sank when she was struck by Olympia (United States) in Lake Erie off Cleveland, Ohio. One crewman killed. Later raised.

=== 21 October ===
List of shipwrecks: 21 October 1898
Ship	State	Description
Cutter No. 2	United States Navy	Cutter No. 2, with a launch lashed to the starboard side, collided with a barge under tow by the tow steamer Pioneer (United States) at Norfolk, Virginia resulting in the capsizing of the cutter and launch, with the cutter sinking. One occupant of the launch drowned.
Rescue	United States	The steamer, laying on the bank just above Lock No. 3 on the Monongahela River, was destroyed when her boiler exploded. Her captain was killed and seven crewmen wounded.

=== 22 October ===
List of shipwrecks: 22 October 1898
Ship	State	Description
Adalanta	United States	The barge, under tow by Thos. J. Sculley (United States), sank in high winds and heavy seas four miles (6.4 km) west of the Cornfield Lightship after the tow line parted. The crew were rescued by Thos. J. Sculley.
Admiral	United States	The barge, under tow by Thos. J. Sculley (United States), sank in high winds and heavy seas four miles (6.4 km) west of the Cornfield Lightship after the tow line parted. Her master and one crewman were killed. The survivors were rescued by Thos. J. Sculley.
Albania	United States	The steamer, laid up for repairs, sank at dock over night at Orange, Texas. Raised and repaired.
Canary	United States	The barge, under tow by Thos. J. Sculley (United States), sank in high winds and heavy seas four miles (6.4 km) west of the Cornfield Lightship after the tow line parted. The crew were rescued by Thos. J. Sculley.
Wyandotte	United States	The barge, under tow by Thos. J. Sculley (United States), sank in high winds and heavy seas four miles (6.4 km) west of the Cornfield Lightship after the tow line parted. The crew were rescued by Thos. J. Sculley.

=== 24 October ===
List of shipwrecks: 24 October 1898
Ship	State	Description
Rebel	United States	The steamer lost covering boards near her stern in a heavy snowstorm and sank between Duluth, Minnesota and Two Harbors, Minnesota. The crew boarded a barge she was towing and were rescued from it by City of London (United States) several hours later. Total loss.

=== 25 October ===
List of shipwrecks: 25 October 1898
Ship	State	Description
D. F. Skinner	United States	The tug burned off Beaverwyck Island and was totally destroyed.
L.R. Doty	United States	The steamer was lost during a storm on Lake Michigan, last seen several miles north of Milwaukee, Wisconsin. Loss with all seventeen hands. The wreck was found 20 miles (32 km) off Oak Creek, Wisconsin in 2010.

=== 26 October ===
List of shipwrecks: 26 October 1898
Ship	State	Description
Calabar	United Kingdom	The Elder Dempster 1,756 GRT cargo ship ran aground and was wrecked at Yellow Well Reef, off Grand Bassa, Liberia, on a voyage from the west coast of Africa to Liverpool.
Horace A. Tuttle	United States	The steamer was wrecked on the bar off Michigan City, Indiana and broke up after heavy damage in Lake Michigan in a gale. Her 11 crew members were rescued by the United States Life Saving Service.

=== 27 October ===
List of shipwrecks: 27 October 1898
Ship	State	Description
St. Peter	United States	St. Peter The schooner sank in a gale in Lake Ontario off Bear Creek 16 miles (14 nmi; 26 km) east of the Charlotte Life Saving Station in Charlotte, New York. The United States Life Saving Service rescued her captain, but his wife and the other four crewmen died. The wreck sits upright in 117 feet (36 m) of water northeast of Pultneyville, New York.

=== 28 October ===
List of shipwrecks: 28 October 1898
Ship	State	Description
John Owen	United States	The steamer struck the side of the channel in the Detroit River at the Limekiln crossing and sank after being in a minor collision with Atlantis (United States).
Julia	United States	The tug burned in the Albany, New York area and was totally destroyed.

=== 29 October ===
List of shipwrecks: 29 October 1898
Ship	State	Description
Cresent	United States	The steamer sank at the Clyde Steamship Dock in Jacksonville, Florida. Promptly raised.

=== 30 October ===
List of shipwrecks: 30 October 1898
Ship	State	Description
Agnes Behrman	United States	Carrying a cargo of maple wood, the 91.7-foot (28.0 m), 110.93-gross register ton two-masted scow schooner dragged her anchor during a storm and struck bottom at Hedgehog Harbor in Door County, Wisconsin. Her hull eventually broke up at 45°17.431′N 087°01.421′W and she became a total loss.

=== 31 October ===
List of shipwrecks: 31 October 1898
Ship	State	Description
Eagle	United States	The passenger steamer struck a snag and sank in St. Louis Harbor. Later raised.
M. Capron	United States	The schooner stranded in a gale in Lake Michigan 1 1/4 miles (2.0 km) west of the Baileys Harbor, Wisconsin Life Saving Station and broke up. Her crew of five was rescued by the United States Life Saving Service. Her rigging was salvaged.

=== Unknown date ===
List of shipwrecks: Unknown date October 1898
Ship	State	Description
Alide J. Rodgers	United States	The 137-foot-6-inch (41.9 m), 340-gross register ton two-masted schooner was lost on Lake Michigan without loss of life during October 1898. Accounts of her fate differ: She either was wrecked off the coast of Wisconsin on a reef in Sturgeon Bay near the Sturgeon Bay Canal North Pierhead Light, then drifted off the reef, broke up and sank, or she sank in Grand Traverse Bay off Old Mission Point near Traverse City, Michigan.
Blengfell	United Kingdom	The ship caught fire off Margate and was completely burnt out.
Fortune Hunter	United States	The steam schooner was discovered in a waterlogged and unmanageable condition approximately 55 nautical miles (102 km; 63 mi) from St. Michael, District of Alaska, by the steamer Tillamook (United States). Tillamook towed her to Golovnin Bay on the Alaskan coast in Norton Sound and beached her there.
Oscar C. Aiken	United States	The coal schooner was running through The Race during a gale, was blown close to Plum Island, New York where she struck a rock and disabled her rudder. She was abandoned and drifted onto Bartlett Reef foundering in seventy feet of water on 23 or 25 October. Wreck located in 2012.
Unidentified barge	United States	The barge was discovered in company with the waterlogged steam schooner Fortune Hunter (United States) approximately 55 nautical miles (102 km; 63 mi) from St. Michael, District of Alaska, by the steamer Tillamook (United States). Tillamook towed the barge to Golovnin Bay in Norton Sound and attempted to beach it there, but it was lost during the attempt with the loss of one life.

== November ==
=== 1 November ===
List of shipwrecks: 1 November 1898
Ship	State	Description
Croatan	United States	The passenger-cargo ship burned and sank in the Atlantic Ocean 18 nautical miles (33 km; 21 mi) off Cape Charles, Virginia. Three crewmen, the wife of one of the dead crewmen, and one passenger were killed. Survivors left the ship in two of her lifeboats and a boat from the schooner Alice E. Clark (United States).
Infanta Maria Teresa	United States Navy	The armored cruiser, captured from the Spanish Navy and refloated after the Battle of Santiago de Cuba, was abandoned in the Crooked Island Passage in the Bahamas when she began to founder during a tropical storm while under tow from Guantánamo Bay, Cuba, to Norfolk, Virginia, by the repair ship USS Vulcan (United States Navy) and the Merritt & Chapman Derrick and Wrecking Company salvage vessel Merritt (United States). Surfboats from Merritt rescued her 114-man crew. She subsequently drifted 55 nautical miles (102 km; 63 mi) before going hard aground between two coral reefs off Cat Island in the Bahamas less than 1 nautical mile (1.9 km; 1.2 mi) south of Bird Point. Her wreck was deemed beyond further salvage and was officially abandoned on 20 November.

=== 2 November ===
List of shipwrecks: 2 November 1898
Ship	State	Description
J. D. Peters	United States	The steamer was damaged in a collision with Czarina (United States) off Angel Island in San Francisco Bay and was beached on Angel Island. Refloated and towed to Sausalito, California, and later Stockton, California, for repairs.

=== 3 November ===
List of shipwrecks: 3 November 1898
Ship	State	Description
Starrucca	United States	The steamer was sunk in a collision with Maritana (United States) in Lake Erie just off the north end of the breakwater for the harbor of Buffalo, New York.

=== 4 November ===
List of shipwrecks: 4 November 1898
Ship	State	Description
Columbia	United States	After her towline parted in gale near Prince of Wales Island in the Alexander Archipelago in Southeast Alaska and Port Simpson, British Columbia, while she was under tow by the tug Wallowa (United States) from Skagway District of Alaska, to Seattle, Washington, with a cargo of 100 tons of general merchandise, the 900-net register ton, 169.5-foot (51.7 m) bark washed ashore on Prince of Wales Island.

=== 5 November ===
List of shipwrecks: 5 November 1898
Ship	State	Description
Mariner	United States	The fishing schooner was wrecked on Sable Island, Nova Scotia. Crew saved.
Nellie	United States	The steamer burned at dock in White Lake, Michigan.

=== 6 November ===
List of shipwrecks: 6 November 1898
Ship	State	Description
Josephine	United States	The ferry boat sank at the foot of Greenwood Street, Allegheny City, Pennsylvania in the Ohio River. Raised and repaired.

=== 7 November ===
List of shipwrecks: 7 November 1898
Ship	State	Description
D. S. Austin	United States	The schooner lost her tow vessel in heavy seas just off Ludington, Michigan, stranding in Lake Michigan three-quarters mile (1.2 km) north of the Life Saving Station and was wrecked, a total loss. Her crew was rescued by the United States Life Saving Service. Her rigging was salvaged.
Minnehaha	United States	The schooner missed the entrance to Sheboygan, Wisconsin in a gale, stranding in Lake Michigan and broke up, a total loss. Her crew was rescued by the United States Life Saving Service. Her rigging was salvaged.

=== 9 November ===
List of shipwrecks: 9 November 1898
Ship	State	Description
Blue Jacket	United Kingdom	The steamer was unaccountably wrecked on a clear night a few yards from the Longships Lighthouse. The crew were saved by the Sennen lifeboat.

=== 10 November ===
List of shipwrecks: 10 November 1898
Ship	State	Description
Iron Cliff	United States	The schooner lost her tow on Lake Michigan off Chicago, Illinois in a heavy gale and grounded. she sprang a leak and sank, but was raised on 16 November. Her seven crewmen were rescued by the United States Life Saving Service.
Lena M. Nielson	United States	The schooner missed the entrance to Saint Joseph, Michigan in a gale and snowstorm and ran aground on a bar. She drifted off the bar and ran aground again in Lake Michigan at Lakeside, Michigan, 20 miles (32 km) away, a total loss. Three of her crew that had not made it to shore earlier were rescued by the United States Life Saving Service.
Theodore S. Fassett	United States	The lumber schooner lost her tow on Lake Huron in a heavy gale. She ran aground 7 miles (11 km) south of the Sand Beach Township, Michigan Life Saving Station. Attempts to refloat started on 11 November and continued until 9 December when salvage efforts were stopped and she was stripped and abandoned. Her crew was rescued by the United States Life Saving Service.
Whaleback 104	United States	The whaleback barge lost her tow leaving Cleveland, Ohio, causing her to drifting against the west breakwater. Pounding on the breakwater opened her seams and she sank. Her six crew were rescued by the United States Life Saving Service.

=== 12 November ===
List of shipwrecks: 12 November 1898
Ship	State	Description
Cinderella	United States	The 57-gross register ton schooner was stranded in Fire Island Inlet on the coast of Long Island, New York. All three people on board survived.
Joseph C. Rich	United States	The steamer sank at Spanish Fort, Alabama. Later raised.
Plymouth	United States	The steamer sank at dock at the foot of Court street, Brooklyn. The two crewmen on board died. Raised and repaired.

=== 14 November ===
List of shipwrecks: 14 November 1898
Ship	State	Description
George W. Wesley	United States	The schooner sprang a leak in harbor at Cleveland, Ohio and was beached.

=== 16 November ===
List of shipwrecks: 16 November 1898
Ship	State	Description
Harry	United States	The laid up tug filled and sank at dock in the Schuylkill River at Pine Street, Philadelphia.

=== 17 November ===
List of shipwrecks: 17 November 1898
Ship	State	Description
Atalanta	United Kingdom	The sailing ship was wrecked off Newport, Oregon. 23 crewmen killed, 3 made it to shore. Total loss of ship and cargo.
Corona	United States	The steamer burned at dock alongside Vision (United States) at Edgewater, Grand Island, New York. Total loss.
Vision	United States	The steamer burned at dock alongside Corona (United States) at Edgewater, Grand Island, New York. Total loss.
Wildwood	United States	The tow steamer burned at Kinders Landing in the Mississippi River. Total loss.

=== 18 November ===
List of shipwrecks: 18 November 1898
Ship	State	Description
Selenoa	United States	The ferry ran into the Crabtree Ledge Light causing a leak bad enough to beach her. Later refloated and taken to Rockland, Maine for repairs.
Wm. M. Everett	United States	The 167-gross register ton schooner sank at Shelter Island, Long Island, New York. All four people aboard survived.

=== 19 November ===
List of shipwrecks: 19 November 1898
Ship	State	Description
Ruby	United States	The steamer caught fire three miles (4.8 km) below Glen Haven, Wisconsin. She was beached, but was destroyed.

=== 20 November ===
List of shipwrecks: 20 November 1898
Ship	State	Description
Annie Weston	United States	The barge, under tow of Mars (United States), filled with water and sank 35 miles (56 km) north east of the Winter Quarter Lightship.

=== 22 November ===
List of shipwrecks: 22 November 1898
Ship	State	Description
Arthur Orr	United States	The steamer went ashore on the north coast of Lake Superior near the Mouth of the Baptism River in a severe snowstorm. Refloated after cargo was lightered and towed to Duluth, Minnesota for repairs.
Tampa	United States	The steamer went ashore near Beaver Bay, Minnesota on Lake Superior in a severe gale and snowstorm. Given up as a total loss, but refloated and towed to Duluth, Minnesota by a wrecking company.

=== 23 November ===
List of shipwrecks: 23 November 1898
Ship	State	Description
Troy	United States	The tug burned at dock at Greenbush, New York, totally destroyed.

=== 25 November ===
List of shipwrecks: 25 November 1898
Ship	State	Description
Detroit	United States	During a voyage in the District of Alaska from Skagway to Juneau with a crew of 10 and about 27 passengers on board, the 109-gross register ton, 81-foot (24.7 m) steamer struck a reef in Lynn Canal off the north end of Shelter Island in the Alexander Archipelago during a snowstorm and sank in 50 feet (15 m) of water. All on board abandoned ship in her lifeboats and survived.
St. Lawrence	United States	The bulk carrier was wrecked two miles (3.2 km) south of Point Betsy in Lake Michigan in a heavy snowstorm. One crewman drowned when ship's yawl overturned. Survivors rescued by the United States Life-Saving Service. She broke up on 9 December after a failed salvage attempt.

=== 26 November ===
List of shipwrecks: 26 November 1898
Ship	State	Description
Edgar S. Foster	United States	Portland Gale: The schooner was wrecked on Brandt Rock, Marshfield, Massachusetts during the gale.
F. R. Walker	United States	Portland Gale: The fishing schooner foundered near Cape Cod during the gale. Lost with all 15 hands.
Harlem	United States	The steamer was wrecked on a reef five miles (8.0 km) south west of Isle Royal in Lake Superior in a violent gale and snowstorm. Total loss.
H. C. Higginson	United States	Portland Gale: The schooner went ashore on Nantasket Beach near Lobster Rock, which is at the base of Atlantic Hill, Hull, Massachusetts. Three crew died.
McConnell	United States	The scow stranded one-quarter mile (0.40 km) from the Erie, Pennsylvania Life Saving Station on Lake Erie. Salvage work began immediately but were abandoned on 29 December and she broke up on 10 February 1899.
Mertis H. Perry	United States	Portland Gale: The fishing schooner was wrecked at Rexhame Beach, Marshfield, Massachusetts during the gale. Lost with 5 of 14 crew.
Willy	United States	The steamer sank after hitting the abutment of a bridge on Darby Creek.

=== 27 November ===
List of shipwrecks: 27 November 1898
Ship	State	Description
Abbot Devereaux	United States	Portland Gale: The schooner was swept ashore on Martha's Vineyard, at Vineyard Haven.
Abby K. Bentley	United States	Portland Gale: The vessel was swept ashore on Martha's Vineyard at Vineyard Haven, or Vineyard Sound near Providence, Rhode Island.
Abel E Babcock	United States	Portland Gale: The schooner was wrecked on Toddy Rocks one mile (1.6 km) off Stony Beach, Hull, Massachusetts and broke up during the gale. All 12 crew died.
Addie E Snow	United States	Portland Gale: The schooner sank with the loss of all hands, near Gloucester, Massachusetts about one-quarter mile (0.40 km) from where Portland (United States) sank during the gale.
Addie Sawyer	United States	Portland Gale: The lumber schooner was swept ashore on the north side of Martha's Vineyard. Her captain and two crewmen were killed, two rescued.
Adelaide T.	United States	Portland Gale: The sloop was swept ashore in Fort Pond Bay during the gale. Refloated undamaged on 3 December.
Agnes Smith	United States	Portland Gale: The schooner dragged anchor at Point Judith, Rhode Island and was swept away, probably sinking during the gale. Crew transferred to John Harvey (United States) during the gale.
Albert L. Butler	United States	Portland Gale: The schooner was wrecked on Peaked Hill Bar near Cape Cod during the gale. Four crewman died, or two crewman and one passenger. Five crew members were rescued by the United States Life-Saving Service.
Alida	United States	Portland Gale: The schooner was anchored at Islesboro, Maine but broke her anchor chain and blow out to sea. She drifted for 20 miles (32 km) before she went ran aground on flats in Lobster Cove during the gale. After the storm she was hauled ashore in a cove and stripped.
Aloha	United States	Portland Gale: The schooner was swept ashore, or swamped, at New Shoreham, Rhode Island during the gale and lost.
Amelia G. Ireland	United States	Portland Gale: The schooner dragged anchor and was swept ashore on Dogfish Bar during the gale. Six crewmen were rescued by the United States Life-Saving Service, the rest of the crew lost.
Anna H. Mason	United States	Portland Gale: The fishing schooner went adrift in the harbor at Gloucester, Massachusetts and was wrecked on Black Bess Rock, going to pieces. Crew saved by Ellie G. King.
Anna Pitcher	United States	Portland Gale: The schooner was swept ashore, or swamped, at New Shoreham, Rhode Island during the gale. Later saved.
Anna W. Barker	United States	Portland Gale: The schooner was wrecked on Southern Island three miles (4.8 km) from the life saving station during the gale. After the storm she was stripped.
Annie Blankenship	United States	Portland Gale: The fishing sloop was swept ashore on flats south of Collin's Wharf, Martha's Vineyard.
Antionette M. Acker	United States	Portland Gale: The schooner was swept ashore at Martha's Vineyard at Vineyard Haven.
Arabell	United States	Portland Gale: The schooner was swept ashore on Block Island, Rhode Island during the gale. Later refloated.
Barge No. 1	United States	Portland Gale: The barge was wrecked near Toddy Rocks near Point Allerton, Massachusetts during the gale. Five crew members were rescued by the United States Life-Saving Service and the Massachusetts Humane Society. Total loss.
Coal Barge No. 4	United States	Portland Gale: The barge was wrecked near Toddy Rocks near Point Allerton, Massachusetts and broke up during the gale. Three crewmen killed, her captain and one crewman made it to shore.
Beaver	United States	Portland Gale: The barge was sunk at Vineyard Haven, Martha's Vineyard. The crew were rescued.
Bertha E. Glover	United States	Portland Gale: The lime schooner was swept ashore on Martha's Vineyard at Vineyard Haven on the east side of the harbor. She sprung a leak causing her cargo of lime to ignite, burning until 19 December when everything above the waterline was consumed.
Brunhilde	United States	Portland Gale: The sloop was swept ashore in Point O' Woods, New York during the gale. Refloated undamaged on 30 November.
Byssus	United States	Portland Gale: The barge was sunk at Vineyard Haven, Martha's Vineyard. Crew rescued.
Calvin Baker	United States	Portland Gale: The schooner was stranded on the north side of Little Brewster Island (Boston Light) and wrecked. Three crewmen lost, five were rescued by the United States Life-Saving Service.
Canaria	United Kingdom	Portland Gale: The vessel was swept ashore on Martha's Vineyard at Vineyard Haven.
Caritu	United Kingdom	Portland Gale: The vessel was swept ashore on Martha's Vineyard at Vineyard Haven.
Carrie E. Sayward	United States	Portland Gale: The fishing schooner went ashore at Provincetown, Massachusetts, later abandoned to the underwriters. Crew saved.
Carrie L. Payson	United States	Portland Gale: The schooner was stranded at Chatham, Massachusetts during the gale.
Cassia	United States	Portland Gale: The sloop was swept ashore, or swamped, at New Shoreham, Rhode Island during the gale and lost. One crewman killed.
Cathy C. Berry	United States	Portland Gale: The schooner was swept ashore in "the bend" in the harbor at Martha's Vineyard.
Charles J. Willard	United States	Portland Gale: The schooner went ran aground at Quoddy Head, Maine during the gale. The crew were rescued by the United States Life-Saving Service and fishermen. Salvage work began 13 December and was she refloated on 16 December.
Chas. E. Raymond	United States	Portland Gale: The vessel was swept ashore on Martha's Vineyard at Vineyard Haven.
Clara Leavitt	United States	Portland Gale: The schooner dragged anchor and was swept ashore on Dogfish Bar and broke up immediately during the gale. Six crewmen killed, one crewman made it to shore.
Clara Smith	United States	Portland Gale: The schooner dragged anchor and was swept across Horse Shoe Shoal off Martha's Vineyard, sinking in 7 fathoms (42 ft; 13 m) of water in the ship channel. Her crew rescued from her masts after 19 hours by the steamer Nereus (United States). One crewman died of exposure during the wait.
Columbia	United States	Portland Gale: The schooner, a Boston pilot boat, was wrecked on the beach at Scituate, Massachusetts, during the gale. All five crew died. A total loss, she was sold and eventually burned in place.
Delaware	United States	Portland Gale: The 310-foot (94 m) barge sank in 60 feet (18 m) of water off North Scituate, Massachusetts, 1 nautical mile (1.9 km; 1.2 mi) east of the reef known as Collamore Ledge, during the gale.
E. J. Willard	United States	Portland Gale: The lime schooner was grounded on Martha's Vineyard on the east side of the Harbor at Vineyard Haven after losing her anchor. She sprung a leak causing her cargo of lime to ignite. Her crew was able to transfer to J. D. Ingraham (United States) when she drifted alongside.
E. J. Hamilton	United States	Portland Gale: The vessel was swept ashore on Martha's Vineyard at Vineyard Haven.
Earl	United States	Portland Gale: The catboat dragged anchor and was swept ashore at Cuttyhunk Harbor during the gale.
Edith	United States	Portland Gale: The catboat dragged anchor and was swept ashore at Cuttyhunk Harbor during the gale.
Edith McIntyre	United States	Portland Gale: The vessel was swept ashore on Martha's Vineyard at Vineyard Haven.
Edna and Etta	United States	Portland Gale: The schooner was swept ashore in Great Egg, New Jersey during the gale. Later refloated.
Emma M. Dyer	United States	Portland Gale: The fishing schooner foundered off Cape Cod. Crew saved by Herman Winter.
Eureka	United States	Portland Gale: The tug dragged anchor and went ashore on Spectacle Island in Lower Boston Harbor during the gale. Refloated and repaired.
E. W. Stetson	United States	Portland Gale: The schooner barge was blown ashore during the gale at Jamesport, New York on Long Island. Refloated and returned to service.
Etta A. Stimpson	United States	The schooner capsized in a storm in Muskeget Channel. Her captain, his wife, and four crewmen died. The mate, the sole survivor, was rescued by Captain James Wilber in a sailboat.
Fairfax	United States	Portland Gale: The 2,551-gross register ton steamer went aground on Sow and Pigs Reef off Cuttyhunk Island, Massachusetts, during the gale. She sank at 41°24.126′N 070°57.954′W. Her entire crew and all six of her passengers were rescued by a tug.
Falcon	United States	Portland Gale: The barge was sunk at Vineyard Haven, Martha's Vineyard. Crew rescued.
Francis Coffin	United States	Portland Gale: The schooner was swept by the gale and sank in a collision with R. H. Shannon (United States) off Vineyard Haven, Martha's Vineyard in 3 fathoms (18 ft; 5.5 m) of water.
Frances Ellen	United States	Portland Gale: The schooner was swept ashore at Martha's Vineyard at Vineyard Haven.
Free Wind	United States	Portland Gale: The schooner was swept ashore at Martha's Vineyard at Vineyard Haven.
Freddie L.	United States	Portland Gale: The steamer broke from her moorings during the gale and was wrecked at Gloucester, Massachusetts.
F. R. Walker	United States	Portland Gale: The fishing schooner foundered, she was last seen just before the storm 40 miles south east of Seguin Light. Wreckage drifted ashore near Race Point. Lost with all 15 hands.
Geo. H. Mills	United States	Portland Gale: The vessel was swept ashore on Martha's Vineyard at Vineyard Haven.
George A. Chafee	United States	Portland Gale: The steamer parted her stern chains at dock at Pigeon Cove, Cape Ann and went on the rocks during the gale. Total loss.
George Walker	United States	Portland Gale: The schooner was swept ashore at Martha's Vineyard, at Vineyard Haven.
Georgietta	United States	Portland Gale: The schooner went ran aground on Great Spruce Head Island during the gale. Salvage work began 29 November and was she eventually refloated and taken to Rockland, Maine for repair.
Henry R. Tilton	United Kingdom	Portland Gale: The schooner was wrecked at Stony Beach, Hull, Massachusetts during the gale. Seven crew members were rescued by the United States Life-Saving Service and the Massachusetts Humane Society. Total loss.
Howard Holder	Canada	Portland Gale: The schooner was swept ashore on Martha's Vineyard at Vineyard Haven.
Ida G. Broere	United States	Portland Gale: The catboat was swept ashore in Lone Hill, New York during the gale. Refloated undamaged on 4 December.
Idella Small	United States	Portland Gale: The schooner was driven ashore and wrecked on Fletcher's Neck, Maine during the gale. Two crew members were rescued by the United States Life-Saving Service, one made if off on his own. Total loss.
Independent	United States	Portland Gale: The schooner barge was blown ashore during the gale at Riverhead, New York on Long Island. Refloated and returned to service.
Ira and Abbie	United States	Portland Gale: The schooner was swept ashore on Block Island, Rhode Island during the gale. Later refloated.
Island Belle	United States	Portland Gale: The schooner was swept ashore at Martha's Vineyard at Vineyard Haven.
Island City	United States	Portland Gale: The schooner was swept ashore at Cottage City on Martha's Vineyard. Lost with all hands.
Ivy Bell	United States	Portland Gale: The schooner dragged anchor and was swept ashore and wrecked at the entrance to the harbor at Portsmouth, New Hampshire during the gale. Her 4 crewmen rescued by the United States Life-Saving Service.
J. D. Ingraham	United States	Portland Gale: The vessel was swept ashore on Martha's Vineyard after being torn from her moorings at Vineyard Haven. While drifting across the harbor she drifted alongside E. J. Willard (United States) giving an opportunity for E. J. Willard's crew to escape the burning vessel.
James A. Brown	United States	Portland Gale: The schooner was swept ashore on Martha's Vineyard at Vineyard Haven.
James Ponder, Jr	United States	Portland Gale: The schooner was swept ashore on Martha's Vineyard at Vineyard Haven.
James Wilson	United States	Portland Gale: The schooner was swept ashore on Martha's Vineyard, at Vineyard Haven.
John Harvey	United States	Portland Gale: The barge dragged anchor at Point Judith, Rhode Island and was driven ashore during the gale. Her crew and Agnes Smith's crew rescued from her by the United States Life-Saving Service. Pulled off later by a tug.
Jordan L. Mott	United States	Portland Gale: The schooner was sunk in Provincetown, Massachusetts during the gale. Her master's father and one crewman died. Four crew members were rescued by the United States Life-Saving Service.
Juanita	United States	Portland Gale: The fishing schooner was driven ashore at Cohasset, Massachusetts during the gale. Later salvaged.
Lady Fenwick	United States	Portland Gale: The steamer went ashore 40 feet (12 m) from her slip at Saybrook, Connecticut after the snowstorm parted her line by chafing.
Leora M. Thurlow	United States	Portland Gale: The schooner was sunk at Vineyard Haven, Martha's Vineyard.
Lester A. Lewis	United States	Portland Gale: The schooner was wrecked in Provincetown, Massachusetts during the gale. All Five crewman died in the rigging.
Lexington	United States	Portland Gale: The schooner was swept ashore, or swamped, at New Shoreham, Rhode Island during the gale and lost.
Lucy Hammond	United States	Portland Gale: The vessel was swept ashore on Martha's Vineyard at Vineyard Haven.
Lucy Nickels	United States	Portland Gale: The bark was wrecked on Black Rock near Point Allerton, Massachusetts during the gale. Her master and mate died. Three crew members were rescued by the United States Life-Saving Service and the Massachusetts Humane Society. Total loss.
Lunet	United States	Portland Gale: Carrying a cargo of coal, the 103-foot (31 m), 172-gross register ton four-masted schooner dragged her anchor during the gale and was wrecked on rocks just outside the reef on the west side of Tarpaulin Cove on Naushon Island off the coast of Massachusetts. Her wreck settled in up to 60 feet (18 m) of water at 41°27′54″N 070°45′18″W. Her entire crew of seven perished.
M. E. Eldredge	United States	Portland Gale: The vessel was swept ashore on Martha's Vineyard.
Margaret J. Stanford	United States	Portland Gale: The steamer went ashore on Prudence Island during the snowstorm. Refloated on 4 December and towed to Providence, Rhode Island for repairs.
Mars Hill	United States	Portland Gale: The schooner was swept ashore on Martha's Vineyard at Vineyard Haven.
Marion Draper	United States	Portland Gale: The vessel was swept ashore on Martha's Vineyard at Vineyard Haven.
Mertis H Perry	United States	Portland Gale: The fishing schooner dragged anchor and was driven ashore two miles (3.2 km) north north west of the Brant Rock, Massachusetts Lifesaving Station in Massachusetts Bay and broke up during the gale. Five crewmen killed, nine survivors made it to shore.
Montillo	United States	Portland Gale: The schooner was swept ashore at Martha's Vineyard at Vineyard Haven.
Mountain Laurel	Canada	Portland Gale: The schooner was swept ashore on Martha's Vineyard at Vineyard Haven.
Nancy Hanks	United States	Portland Gale: The cat boat was swept ashore at Fourth Cliff, Massachusetts. Refloated on 19 May 1899.
Narcissus	Canada	Portland Gale: The schooner was lost at sea during the gale after leaving Boston, Massachusetts. crew rescued by Hiram Lowell (United States).
Nellie B.	United States	Portland Gale: The schooner was swept ashore, or swamped, at New Shoreham, Rhode Island during the gale and lost.
Nellie Doe	United States	Portland Gale: The vessel was swept ashore on Martha's Vineyard at Vineyard Haven.
Nellie M. Slade	United States	Portland Gale: The bark was swept ashore on Martha's Vineyard at Vineyard Haven.
Newburgh	United Kingdom	Portland Gale: The vessel was swept ashore on Martha's Vineyard at steamboat wharf, Vineyard Haven.
Newell B. Hawes	United States	Portland Gale: The schooner was driven ashore on east side of Davis Neck, Massachusetts during the gale. Five crew members were rescued by the United States Life-Saving Service. Refloated on 4 December.
Northern Home	Canada	Portland Gale: The schooner was swept ashore on Martha's Vineyard at Vineyard Haven.
P. T. Willets	United States	Portland Gale: The schooner was swept ashore on Martha's Vineyard at Vineyard Haven.
Pentagoet	United States	Portland Gale: The 128-foot (39 m), 332-gross register ton screw steamer sank during the gale somewhere off the Massachusetts coast. Her wreck has currently not been found. The entire crew of 18 was lost.
Phantom	United States	Portland Gale: The fishing schooner went ashore at Plymouth, Massachusetts. Crew saved.
Pinafore	United States	Portland Gale: The steamer sank at dock in the Isles of Shoals, Maine during the gale.
Portland	United States	Portland Gale: The 2,284-gross register ton sidewheel paddle steamer sank in the gale in 460 feet (140 m) of water off the coast of Massachusetts in Massachusetts Bay, midway between Gloucester and Provincetown, with the loss of everyone on board, reported by a contemporary United States Government report as 63 crew members and 60 passengers but later believed to be between 175 and 245 people. The Portland Gale was named for her. Her wreck was identified in 2002 in what is now the Stellwagen Bank National Marine Sanctuary.
Queen of the West	United States	Portland Gale: The schooner was wrecked on Fletcher's Neck, Maine during the gale. Two crew members, and a dog, were rescued by the United States Life-Saving Service. She broke up an hour after her crew was rescued.
Quetay	United Kingdom	Portland Gale: The vessel was swept ashore on Martha's Vineyard at Vineyard Haven.
R. H. Shannon	United States	Portland Gale: The schooner was swept ashore on Martha's Vineyard at Vineyard Haven.
Rebecca W. Huddell	United States	Portland Gale: The vessel was swept ashore on Martha's Vineyard at Vineyard Haven.
Reliance	United States	Portland Gale: The catboat was swept ashore in Point O' Woods, New York during the gale. Refloated undamaged on 28 November.
Renfrew	Canada	Portland Gale: The schooner was wrecked off Hart's Isle, Canso during the gale.
Rose Brothers	United States	Portland Gale: The schooner was swept ashore, or swamped, at New Shoreham, Rhode Island during the Gale and lost.
Sadie Willcult	United States	Portland Gale: The vessel was swept ashore on Martha's Vineyard at Vineyard Haven.
Secret	United States	Portland Gale: The catboat dragged anchor and was swept ashore at Cuttyhunk Harbor during the gale.
Smeed	United States	Portland Gale: The schooner dragged anchor at New Shoreham, Rhode Island and was swept ashore during the gale. She was refloated on the next high tide.
Sport	United States	Portland Gale: The catboat dragged anchor and was swept ashore at Cuttyhunk Harbor during the gale.
Starlight	United States	Portland Gale: The schooner was swept ashore on Martha's Vineyard at Vineyard Haven.
Stranger	United States	Portland Gale: The catboat was swept ashore, or swamped, at New Shoreham, Rhode Island during the gale. Later saved.
Success	Canada	Portland Gale: The schooner was wrecked off Ferguson's Cove, Halifax, Nova Scotia during the gale. Two killed.
Teddie	United States	Portland Gale: The steamer sank at dock at New London, Connecticut during the snowstorm.
Telegraph	United States	Portland Gale: The schooner was swept ashore at Cottage City on Martha's Vineyard. Lost with all hands.
Terry	United States	Portland Gale: The schooner was swept ashore on Martha's Vineyard at Vineyard Haven.
Timothy Field	United States	Portland Gale: The schooner was swept ashore at Martha's Vineyard at Vineyard Haven.
Unidentified sloop	United States	Portland Gale: The sloop swamped at dock at White Head, Maine during the gale. Raised after the storm passed.
Valetta	United Kingdom	Portland Gale: The schooner was swept ashore on "the point" in the harbor, Martha's Vineyard.
Valora	United States	Portland Gale: The steamer sank at dock at East Boston, Massachusetts during the gale. Raised and repaired.
Venus	United States	Portland Gale: The fishing Sloop went ashore at Plymouth, Massachusetts. Crew saved.
Vigilant	United States	Portland Gale: The steamer was wrecked at Provincetown, Massachusetts during the gale. Total loss.
Virginia	United States	Portland Gale: The downeast lumberman was lost off Thompson Island.
Wild Rose	United States	Portland Gale: The schooner went ashore at Cranberry Isles, Maine during the gale. Salvage work began 2 December and was she refloated on 5 December.
Wildwood	United States	The steamer struck a submerged piling at dock on a falling tide at Port Townsend, Washington and sank. Raised and repaired.
William Penn	United States	Portland Gale: The schooner was swept ashore on Martha's Vineyard at Vineyard Haven.
William Todd	United States	Portland Gale: The vessel was sunk at Vineyard Haven, Martha's Vineyard.
William M. Wilson	United States	The schooner sprung a leak and sank three miles (4.8 km) north north east of Wachapreague, Virginia. The crew were rescued by the United States Life-Saving Service.
Winnie Lawry	United States	Portland Gale: The vessel was swept ashore on Martha's Vineyard, at Vineyard Haven.

== December ==
=== 3 December ===
List of shipwrecks: 3 December 1898
Ship	State	Description
City of Yonkers	United States	The launch was damaged in a collision with Manhattan (United States) in the East River. She was run aground at Wallabout, Brooklyn, but sank.
L. W. Brown	United States	The steamer sank in a gale in Lake Pontchartrain at the North East Bridge. Raised and repaired.

=== 5 December ===
List of shipwrecks: 5 December 1898
Ship	State	Description
Thomas Booz	United States	The schooner dragged anchor and stranded on the east side of Hooper's Island near Port Clyde, Maine. She was stripped and abandoned, a total loss.
Vamoose	United Kingdom	The schooner was wrecked, breaking in two, on the north east coast of Block Island, Rhode Island in a gale. Her master and mate were killed, four crew members were rescued by the United States Life-Saving Service and two made it to shore on their own.

=== 6 December ===
List of shipwrecks: 6 December 1898
Ship	State	Description
Geo. B. Owen	United States	The schooner's towline parted and she stranded on the east side of the Harbor at Ashtabula, Ohio in a heavy snowstorm. She was abandoned, a total loss. Six crew members, five men and a woman, were rescued by the United States Life-Saving Service. Wreck abandoned to the insurance company.

=== 7 December ===
List of shipwrecks: 7 December 1898
Ship	State	Description
Puritan	United States	The schooner was beached at Assateague Beach, Virginia, after springing a leak in a gale at sea and being heavily damaged. Refloated on 15 December.

=== 8 December ===
List of shipwrecks: 8 December 1898
Ship	State	Description
J. N. Harbin	United States	The steamer struck an obstruction and sank near Swan Lake, Arkansas in the Arkansas River. Later raised.
Pioneer	United States	The 25-ton sealing schooner was wrecked with the loss of all hands on the northern coast of Vancouver Island off the coast of British Columbia. First Nations residents found her wreckage and the skeletons of eight members of her crew in 1899.

=== 9 December ===
List of shipwrecks: 9 December 1898
Ship	State	Description
Advance	United States	The steamer sank when rammed by the icebreaker Bulldozer (United States) she was towing just above the Laughlin Bridge Pittsburgh, Pennsylvania in the Monongahela River. Raised and repaired.
Black Ball No. 2	United States	The tow steamer was sunk by ice in the Chicago River. Total loss.
Castalia	United Kingdom	The hospital ship was struck by Barrowmore (United Kingdom) while moored on Long Reach in the River Thames.
Industry	United Kingdom	The 21-ton sail fishing smack was run down and sunk in a collision with John Burberry (United Kingdom) off St. Bee's Head. Two crew were killed.

=== 10 December ===
List of shipwrecks: 10 December 1898
Ship	State	Description
Governor	United States	The tug was sunk in a collision with Peter Cahill (United States) four and a half miles (7.2 km) west south west of Rockaway Point. Seven crew members were rescued by the United States Life-Saving Service and the barge Walter W. (United States). Total loss.
Little Lizzie	United States	The schooner stranded on Norton's Island near White Head, Maine. She started to break up after pounding on the rocks and was abandoned after being stripped, a total loss. Two crew members were rescued by the United States Life-Saving Service.
Peter Cahill	United States	The tug was in a collision with Governor (United States) four and a half miles (7.2 km) west south west of Rockaway Point and ran aground on Rockaway Shoals. Eight crewmembers were rescued by the United States Life-Saving Service and the barge Walter W. (United States). Refloated on 16 December.

=== 11 December ===
List of shipwrecks: 11 December 1898
Ship	State	Description
Bob Connell	United States	The steamer was sunk by ice in the Allegheny River across the river from Thirteenth street, Pittsburgh, Pennsylvania. Raised and repaired.
Ida	Australia	The cutter was wrecked and broke up.
Ida	Spain	The steamer was wrecked.

=== 12 December ===
List of shipwrecks: 12 December 1898
Ship	State	Description
Oresa	United States	The fishing schooner went ashore on Goose Island, Beaver Harbour, Nova Scotia during a thick snow storm, and was a total loss. Crew saved, rowing to the mainland in their dories, after spending the night on an island.

=== 13 December ===
List of shipwrecks: 13 December 1898
Ship	State	Description
John Howard	United States	The steamer burned at Columbia, Louisiana. Total loss.

=== 14 December ===
List of shipwrecks: 14 December 1898
Ship	State	Description
Joseph Curtis	United States	The tug tilted to port, filled and sank in the Harlem River when her tow schooner Joseph Murray's (United States) main sail caught a sudden strong gust of wind careening her to the point of upsetting the tug. The tug was later raised.
Rescue No. 2	United States	The tow steamer burned in St. Louis Harbor. Total loss.

=== 15 December ===
List of shipwrecks: 15 December 1898
Ship	State	Description
Brinkburn	Unknown	The ship struck the Maiden Bower, Isles of Scilly in fog and sank, while bound for Le Havre from Galveston with cotton and cotton seed. Her crew of mainly lascars survived. An inspection of the wreck in 1966 found two other ships beneath her; one, Sussex, which sank in 1885 and an unknown warship.
Geo. B. McClellan	United States	The steamer burned to the waterline at dock in Michigan City, Indiana.

=== 17 December ===
List of shipwrecks: 17 December 1898
Ship	State	Description
Martin Swain	United States	The fishing steamer burned to the waterline at Rain's Dock in the Ste. Marie River. One fisherman was missing, presumed dead.

=== 21 December ===
List of shipwrecks: 21 December 1898
Ship	State	Description
Oakland	New South Wales	The passenger cargo ship ran aground on the bar at Ballina, New South Wales, Australia. She was refloated, repaired, and returned to service.

=== 22 December ===
List of shipwrecks: 22 December 1898
Ship	State	Description
Mayport	United States	The steamer burned at Jacksonville, Florida.
T. M. Moore	United States	The steamer burned at dock at Grand Island, New York. Total loss.

=== 23 December ===
List of shipwrecks: 23 December 1898
Ship	State	Description
Joys	United States	The ship burned while at anchor in the Sturgeon Bay Ship Canal.

=== 24 December ===
List of shipwrecks: 24 December 1898
Ship	State	Description
Osceola	United States	The steamer struck an obstruction leaving Avenue Landing, Missouri, and sprung a leak. She was beached on a bar across the river, but sank in 26 feet (7.9 m) of water, a total loss.

=== 25 December ===
List of shipwrecks: 25 December 1898
Ship	State	Description
C. H. Woods	United States	The sawmill steamer burned near Poseys Landing, Arkansas, on the Arkansas River.

=== 26 December ===
List of shipwrecks: 26 December 1898
Ship	State	Description
Teche	United States	The steamer struck an obstruction in the Mississippi River 55 miles (89 km) above New Orleans, Louisiana, then burned. Total loss.

=== 28 December ===
List of shipwrecks: 28 December 1898
Ship	State	Description
Lakme	United States	The steamer caught fire at sea and arrived at Astoria, Oregon on 26 December. On 28 December she was beached/scuttled.
Saint Lawrence	United States	The 41-gross register ton, 64.6-foot (19.7 m) fishing schooner was wrecked in a blinding snowstorm and heavy gale in Pybus Bay southwest of Brother Island (57°18′N 133°50′W) in Frederick Sound in the Alexander Archipelago in Southeast Alaska. The schooner North (United States) rescued her entire crew of seven.

=== 29 December ===
List of shipwrecks: 29 December 1898
Ship	State	Description
Glenavon	United Kingdom	The cargo ship was wrecked on the Linting Rock in the Sa Mun group off the coast of China with the loss of four lives.

=== 31 December ===
List of shipwrecks: 31 December 1898
Ship	State	Description
Lottie	United States	The tow steamer caught fire off the Tulleytown, Pennsylvania Wharf and was beached. Burned to water's edge.

=== Unknown date ===
List of shipwrecks: Unknown date December 1898
Ship	State	Description
Stad Aalst	Belgium	Stad Aalst The ship was wrecked on or before 16 December.
HM Torpedo Boat 28	Royal Navy	The decommissioned TB 26-class torpedo boat was sunk as a target off Cape Town, South Africa, after stranding in July and being refloated.

== Unknown date ==
List of shipwrecks: Unknown date 1898
Ship	State	Description
Anita	United States	The steamer was reported lost in Cook Inlet on the south-central coast of the District of Alaska.
Arthur Kaye	United States	The 70-foot (21 m) screw steamer burned to the waterline on Geneva Lake in Wisconsin sometime during the second half of 1898. Her steam engine and boiler were salvaged.
Constantine	United States	While under tow by the steamer Progresso (United States), the river steamer broke loose and sank in the Gulf of Alaska 450 nautical miles (830 km; 520 mi) off Dixon Entrance on the border between the District of Alaska and British Columbia.
Gouverneur-Generaal Loudon	Netherlands	The mail steamer and excursion vessel was wrecked in the Flores Sea off the Tengga Batoe reef south of Selayar Island.
Lofthus	Norway	The barque sank off Manalapan, Florida, United States.
Matinee	United States	The 37-ton schooner was lost with all hands in the Aleutian Islands.
Naro	United States	The steamer was wrecked at Point Highfield (56°29′15″N 132°23′15″W) on the northern tip of Wrangell Island in the Alexander Archipelago in Southeast Alaska.
Ohio	United States	The schooner broke free of her anchorage at Port Simpson, British Columbia, in a gale and went adrift, eventually being wrecked on a small uninhabited island in the Alexander Archipelago in Southeast Alaska near the south end of Revillagigedo Channel. Her crew survived and was rescued by Alaskan Natives a week later.
SMS S85	Imperial German Navy	The torpedo boat was stranded. She was raised, repaired, and returned to service.
Saxon	United Kingdom	The tug became disabled in the Bristol Channel and ran aground on Frenchman's Bank. Her crew were rescued by the Mumbles Lifeboat.
Toledo	United States	The steamer became water logged 25 miles south west of the Michigan Ship Canal in Lake Superior on either 29 September or 29 October. She was towed to shore at the entrance to the Canal where she broke up in a strong wind, a total loss. The remains of the wreck were blown up during widening of the Canal in 1935.
