= Half hull model ship =

Wooden model featuring only one half of a boat's hull

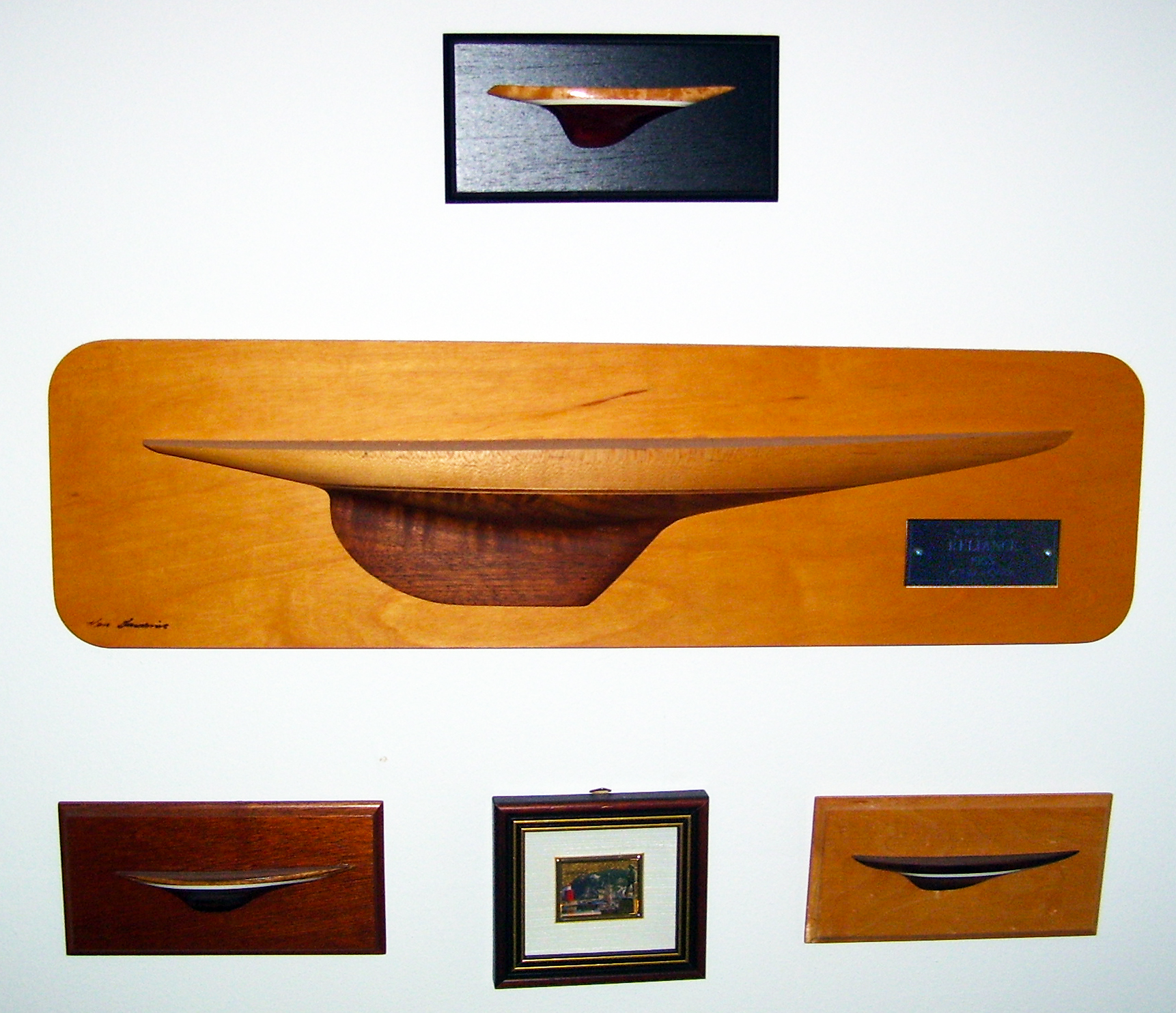
Several half hull model ships hanging on wall

A half hull model ship (also known as a "half hull" or "half ship") is a wooden model ship featuring only one half of a boat's hull without rigging or other fixtures.

== Background ==
Prior to the twentieth century, half hull model ships were constructed by shipwrights as a means of planning a ship's design and sheer and ensuring that the ship would be symmetrical. The half hulls were mounted on a board and were exact scale replicas of the actual ship's hull. With the advent of computer design, half hulls are now built as decorative nautical art and constructed after a ship is completed.

Early half hull models (built 1809–1870 of Salem, Massachusetts ships) at the Peabody Essex Museum

== See also ==
- Wooden model ship
- Marine Art
