= Van Wies Point =

Coordinates: 42.5817469°N 73.7556766°W

Van Wies Point is a cape on the Hudson River in Albany County, New York.

Van Wies Point was named after Jan Van Wie.
