= Wooden ship model =

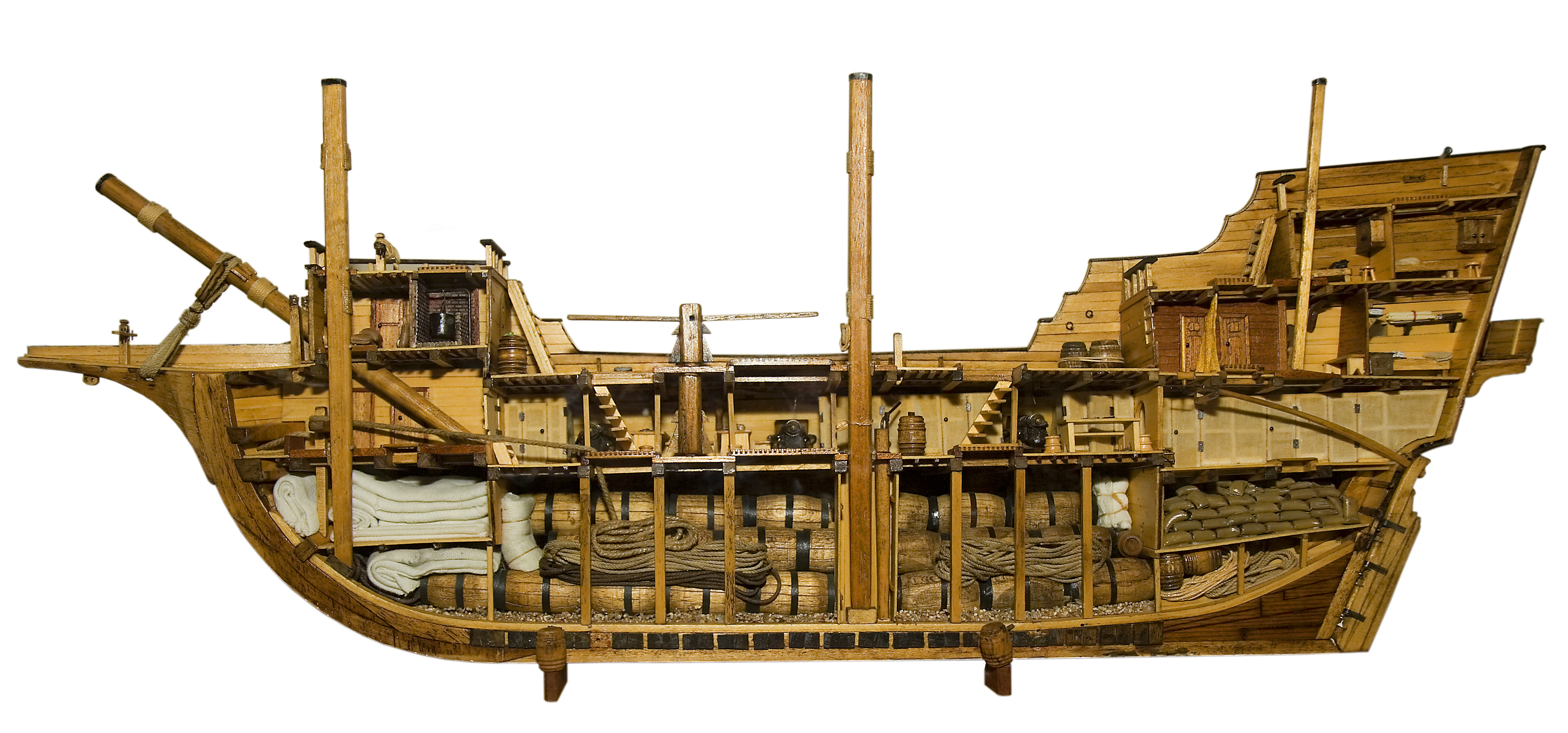
Model of 17th-century English merchantman ship

Wooden ship models or wooden model ships are scale representations of ships, constructed mainly of wood. This type of model has been built for over two thousand years.

== Basic types of wooden ship model construction ==
There are five basic types of construction used in building a wooden ship model hull:

- Solid wood hull sawn and carved from a single block of wood.
- Gluing together two thinner blocks of wood so that a block is formed with the seam vertical, so that the seam will show running down that surface of the block which is to be the deck. No advantage is gained by having the seam show along the sides of the hull.
- Bread and Butter Cutting four or five thinner slabs of wood (the Bread) to be glued (the Butter) later into a laminated block. In this case, the slabs will be oriented so that they sit one on top of the other.
- Plank on bulkhead, a technique in which a series of shaped bulkheads are placed along the keel to form a shaped stage which will be covered with planks to form the hull of the model.
- Plank on frame In this technique, the model is built just as the full-size wooden ship is constructed. The keel is laid down in a manner which keeps it straight and true.. The sternpost and stem are erected, deadwood and strengthening pieces inserted, and a series of shaped frames are built and erected along the keel to form the internal framework of the model. The planks are then applied over the frame to form the external covering.

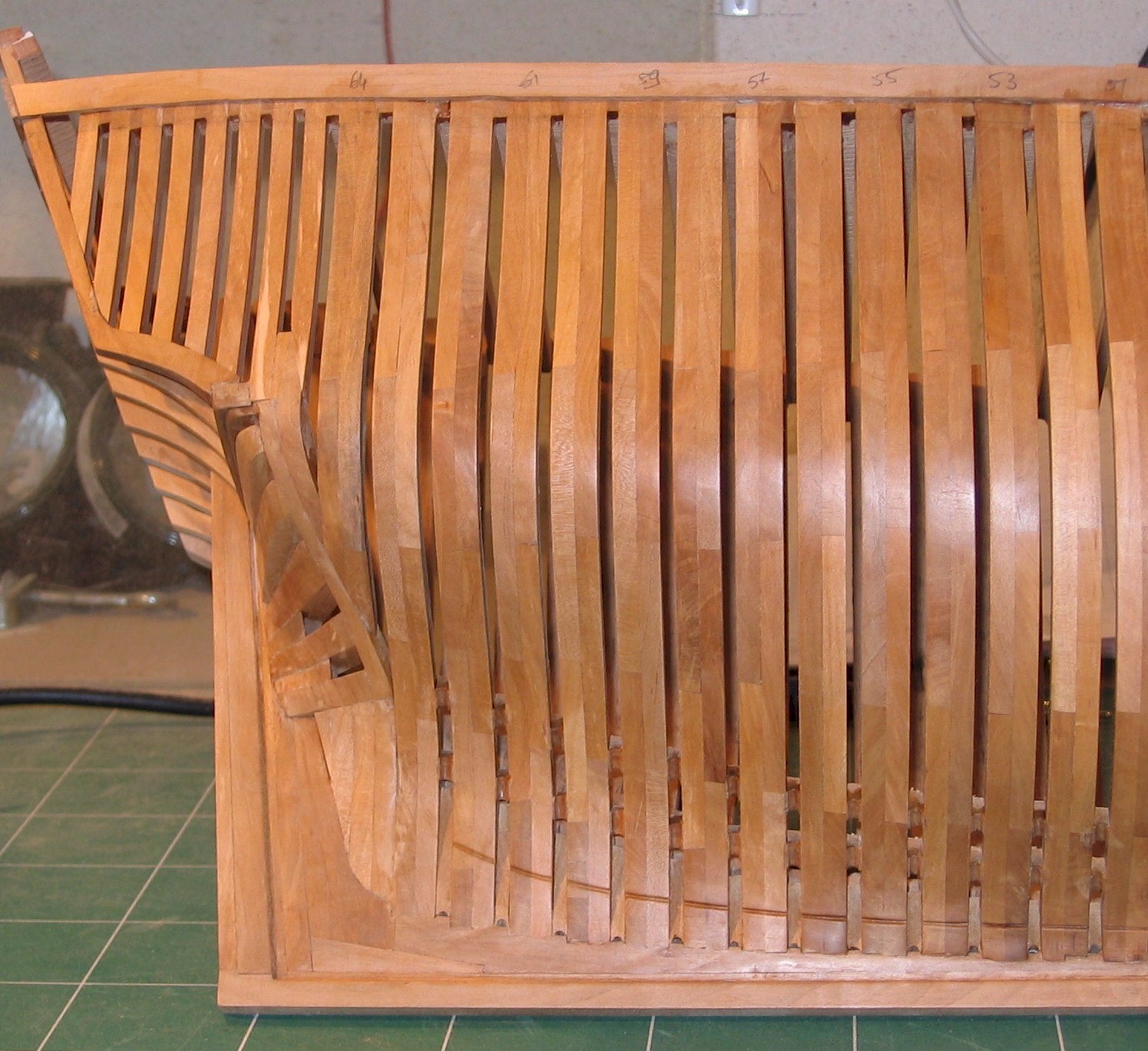
Admiralty Style model illustrating the frames of a ship

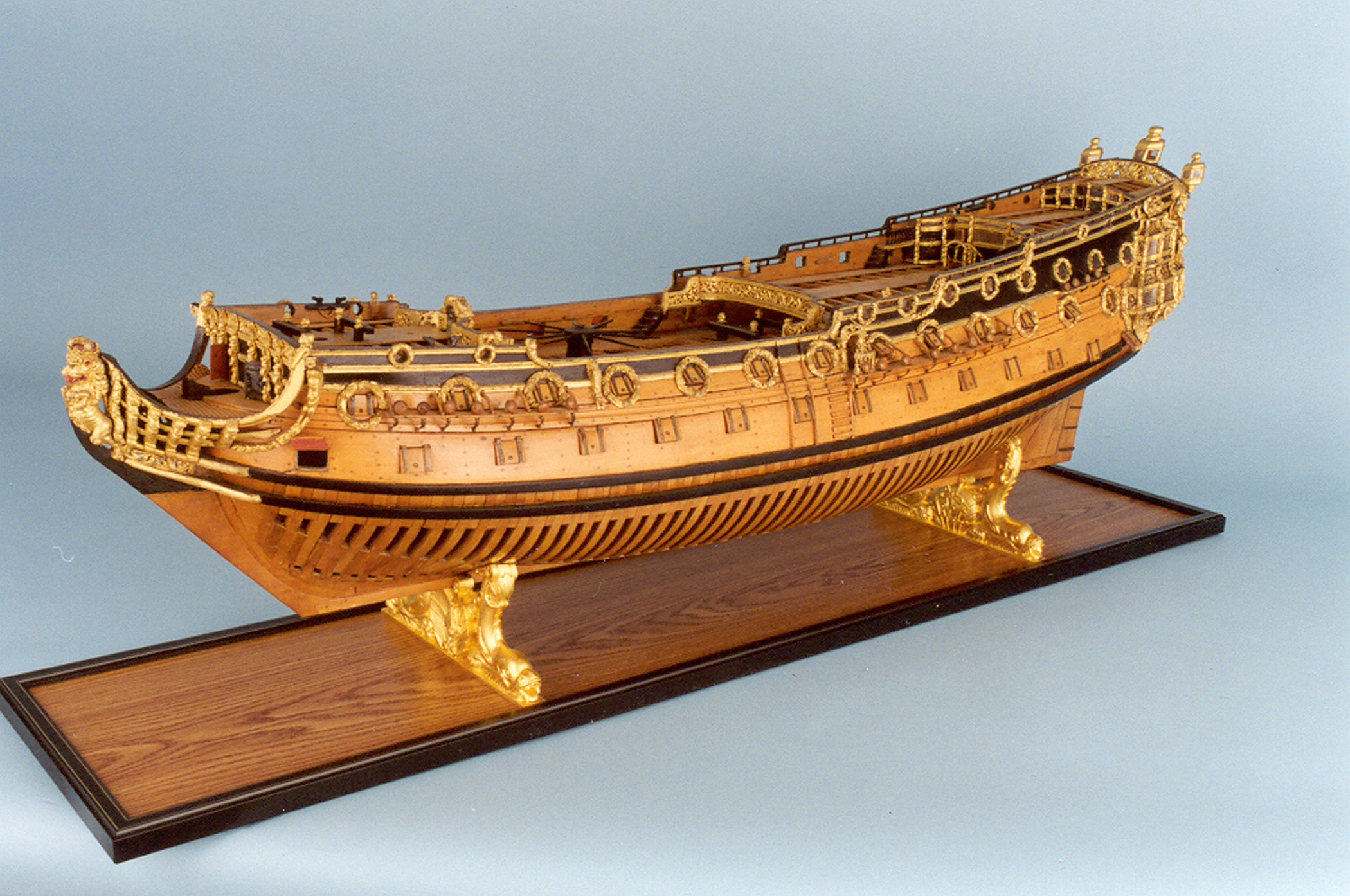
HMS Sussex on display at the US Naval Academy Museum

== Scale conversion factors ==
Table of Scale Conversion Factors
from	to 1/8	to 3/16	to 1/4
1/16	2.0	3.0	4.0
1/12	1.5	2.25	3.0
3/32	1.33	2.0	2.67
1/8	1.0	1.5	2.0
5/32	0.8	1.2	1.6
3/16	0.67	1.0	1.33
1.5	0.625	0.94	1.25
7/32	0.57	0.86	1.14
1/4	0.5	0.75	1.0

Instead of using plans made specifically for models, many model shipwrights use the actual blueprints for the original vessel. One can take drawings for the original ship to a blueprint service and have them blown up, or reduced to bring them to the new scale. For instance, if the drawings are in 1/4" scale and you intend to build in 3/16", tell the service to reduce them 25%. You can use the conversion table below to determine the percentage of change. You can easily work directly from the original drawings however, by changing scale each time you make a measurement.

The equation for converting a measurement in one scale to that of another scale is D2 = D1 × F, where:

- D1 = Dimension in the "from-scale"
- D2 = Dimension in the "to-scale"
- F = Conversion factor between scales

Example: A yardarm is 6 inches long in 3/16" scale. Find its length in 1/8" scale.

- F = .67 (from table)
- D2 = 6" × .67 = 4.02 = 4"

It is easier to make measurements in the metric system and then multiply them by the scale conversion factor. Scales are expressed in fractional inches, but fractions themselves are harder to work with than metric measurements. For example, a hatch measures 1" wide on the draft. You are building in 3/16" scale. Measuring the hatch in metric, you measure 25 mm. The conversion factor for 1/4" to 3/16", according to the conversion table is .75. So 25 mm × .75 = 18.75 mm, or about 19 mm. That is the hatch size in 3/16" scale.

Conversion is a fairly simple task once you start measuring in metric and converting according to the scale.

There is a simple conversion factor that allows you to determine the approximate size of a model by taking the actual measurements of the full-size ship and arriving at a scale factor. It is a rough way of deciding whether you want to build a model that is about two feet long, three feet long, or four feet long.

Here is a ship model conversion example using a real ship, the Hancock. This is a frigate appearing in Chappelle's History of American Sailing Ships. In this example we want to estimate its size as a model. We find that the length is given at 136 ft 7 in, which rounds off to 137 feet.

1/8 scale	Feet divided by 8
3/16 scale	Feet divided by 5.33
1/4 scale	Feet divided by 4

To convert feet (of the actual ship) to the number of inches long that the model will be, use the factors in the table on the right.

To find the principal dimensions (length, height, and width) of a (square-rigged) model in 1/8" scale, then:

1. Find scaled length by dividing 137 by 8 = 17.125"
2. Find 50% of 17.125 and add it to 17.125 (8.56 + 17.125 = 25.685, about 25.5)
3. Typically, the height of this model will be its length less 10%, or about 23.1/2"
4. Typically, the beam of this model will be its length divided by 4, or about 6½"

Although this technique allows you to judge the approximate length of a proposed model from its true footage, only square-riggers will fit the approximate height and beam by the above factors. To approximate these dimensions on other craft, scale the drawings from which you found the length and arrive at her mast heights and beam.

== See also ==
- Half hull model ship
