= USS McKee (TB-18) =

Torpedo boat of the United States Navy

History

United States
- Name: McKee
- Namesake: Lieutenant Hugh W. McKee
- Ordered: 10 June 1896 (authorised)
- Builder: Columbian Iron Works, Baltimore, MD
- Laid down: 11 September 1897
- Launched: 5 March 1898
- Sponsored by: Mrs. William H. Humrichouse
- Commissioned: 16 May 1898
- Decommissioned: 29 January 1912
- Stricken: 6 April 1912
- Identification: TB-18
- Fate: Sunk as target ship, fall 1920

General characteristics
- Class & type: MacKenzie-class torpedo boat
- Displacement: 65 long tons (66 t)
- Length: 99 ft 3 in (30.25 m)
- Beam: 12 ft 9 in (3.89 m)
- Draft: 4 ft 3 in (1.30 m) (mean)
- Installed power: 2 × Thornycroft boilers; 850 ihp (630 kW)
- Propulsion: vertical triple expansion engine; 1 × screw propellers
- Speed: 20 knots (37 km/h; 23 mph); 19.82 kn (22.81 mph; 36.71 km/h) (Speed on Trial)
- Complement: 12 officers and enlisted
- Armament: 2 × 1-pounder (37 mm (1.46 in)) guns; 2 × 18-inch (450 mm) torpedo tubes (2x1)

The first USS McKee (Torpedo Boat No. 18/TB-18) was laid down on 11 September 1897 by Columbian Iron Works, Baltimore, Maryland, United States, launched 5 March 1898; sponsored by Mrs. William H. Humrichouse; and commissioned 16 May 1898.

McKee underwent sea trials in the Chesapeake Bay and then sailed to New York to assume coastal defense duties during Spanish–American War. Reassigned to Torpedo Station Newport, R.I., the coal‑burning torpedo boat operated along the New England coast until returning to New York 13 December 1903, where she decommissioned 22 December 1903.

Eight months later, 6 August 1904, she recommissioned and steamed back to Newport. From 1907 to 1910 she operated from New York, then was assigned special duty in the reserve at Newport. On 29 January 1912 she arrived New York and decommissioned. Struck from the Navy list 6 April 1912, McKee was towed to Norfolk, Virginia and used as a target. On 24 September 1920 she was ordered sunk near Craney Island, an order carried out later that fall.
