= SS Governor =

- SS Governor (1907), sank 1921 after a collision
- SS Governor (1915), sunk 14 March 1917

== See also ==
- Governor (disambiguation)
- SS Governor Cobb
