= Cuttyhunk Harbor =

- Location of Cuttyhunk Harbor within Massachusetts Cuttyhunk Harbor (the United States)
- Coordinates: 41.4273300°N 70.9119791°W
- Part of: Atlantic Ocean

Cuttyhunk Harbor is a bay in Dukes County, Massachusetts. It is located between Copicut Neck on Cuttyhunk Island and Nashawena Island 0.5 miles (0.80 km) northeast of Cuttyhunk in the Town of Gosnold. Cuttyhunk Harbor is connected to Vineyard Sound by Canapitsit Channel. Cuttyhunk is an Indian word meaning "cleared land" or "plantation".
