= SS Stella =

Several steamships have borne the name Stella:

- SS Stella (1869) was a steam passenger ferry built as Fredriksborg in 1869 by William Lindberg's Shipyard in Stockholm for the Waxholms Ångfartygs AB. Renamed Stella in Finnish ownership in 1890, and now the restaurant ship Katarina in Turku.
- SS Stella (1871 Amsterdam) was a 1,174-ton passenger/cargo ship launched in April 1871, by Koninklijke Fabriek, Amsterdam, the Netherlands for the Dutch company Koninklijke Nederlandsche Stoomboot Maatschappij. Arrived for scrapping in Rotterdam in May 1909.
- SS Stella (1871 Low Walker) was a 1,600-ton cargo ship launched as Northumbria on 3 June 1871, by Wigham Richardson in Walker, Newcastle upon Tyne, England. Renamed Stella in 1905, wrecked off Salina, Italy, on 27 April 1911.
- SS Stella (1883) was an 18-gross register ton American sternwheel paddle steamer that sank at Mudds Landing, Illinois, on 4 January 1912.
- SS Stella (1885) was a 2,430-ton cargo ship launched for the Herskind & Woods on 13 October 1885, by Withy in Middleton, England. Torpedoed and sunk as the Greek Mikelis off Strangford Lough on 24 July 1917.
- SS Stella (1888 Dundee) was a 1,294-ton cargo ship launched on 17 October 1888 by the Gourlay Bros in Dundee, Scotland, as Ardle. Renamed Stella in 1906. Torpedoed and sunk as Jönköping II off Inchcape, Scotland on 24 January 1918.
- SS Stella (1888 Oskarshamn) was a 341-ton cargo ship completed in January 1889, by Motala MV in Oskarshamn, Sweden. Lost in collision in the Firth of Forth on 8 December 1903.
- SS Stella (1889) was a 469-ton cargo ship launched on 7 August 1889, by Flensburger in Flensburg, Germany. Mined and sunk off Naissaar on 22 August 1915.
- SS Stella (1890) was a 1,059-ton passenger ferry launched on 16 September 1890, by J & G Thompson Ltd in Clydebank, Scotland. Wrecked off Casquets, Channel Islands on 30 March 1899.
- SS Stella (1895) was a 479-ton cargo ship completed in April 1895, by Weser in Bremen, Germany. Bombed and sunk by aircraft at Bremen on 30 March 1945.
- SS Stella (1897) was a 3,062-ton cargo ship launched as the British Middleham Castle on 29 April 1897, by Pickersgill in Southwick, England. Renamed Stella in 1931. Lost in collision on 25 March 1934.
- SS Stella (1898) was a 3,805-ton passenger/cargo ship launched as the Belgian Albertville on 9 May 1898, by Sir Raylton Dixon & Co in Middlesbrough, England. Renamed Stella in 1920. Delivered for scrapping at Genoa, Italy, on 23 June 1925.
- SS Stella (1904) was an 82-gross register ton sternwheel paddle steamer launched in 1904 that burned at Greenwood, Mississippi, on 4 December 1906.
- SS Stella (1905) was a 1,198-ton cargo ship completed as the Norwegian Hellik in May 1905, by Framnæs Mekaniske Værksted in Sandefjord, Norway. Renamed Stella in 1929. Renamed two more times before removed from registers in 1959.
- SS Stella (1907) was a 2,808-ton Austro-Hungarian cargo ship launched on 7 November 1907, by Stephenson in Hebburn, England. Sank as Magyar on 18 September 1933 after running into an object the previous day.
- SS Stella (1909) was a 2,818-ton Dutch cargo ship launched on 30 November 1909, by Hamilton in Glen Yard, Scotland. Bombed and sunk by aircraft on 11 May 1940.
- SS Stella (1911) was a 5,035-ton cargo ship launched as the Austro-Hungarian Erdely on 2 March 1911, by Palmers' in Jarrow, England. Renamed Stella in 1935, and damaged by fire on 6 September 1936. Broken up at Genoa, Italy from 16 November 1936.
- SS Stella (1912) was an 836-ton Danish cargo ship launched on 19 April 1912, by Kjøbenhavns in Copenhagen, Denmark. Shelled and sunk by the German cruisers Brummer and Bremse east of Lerwick, Shetland, on 17 October 1917.
- SS Stella (1920 Hansweert) was an 845-ton Danish cargo ship launched on 22 December 1920, by Zeeland in Hansweert, the Netherlands. Suffered fire at Almeria, Spain, on 19 July 1970, as Reus. Scrapped in place from October 1970.
- SS Stella (1920 Rendsburg) was a 655-ton German cargo ship completed in December 1920, by Nobiskrug in Rendsburg, Germany. Renamed Riga in 1938. Wrecked at Kirkenes, Norway, on 29 February 1944.
- SS Stella (1921) was an 865-ton cargo ship launched as the German Stella Wega on 27 July 1921, by Howaldtswerke in Kiel, Germany. Renamed Stella in 1924. Foundered and sank as Janaki west of Bombay, India, on 13 March 1954.
- SS Stella (1923) was a 4,266-ton cargo ship launched as the British Barbara Marie on 15 February 1923, by Priestman in Southwick, England. Renamed Stella in 1937. Renamed two more times before wrecked as Inchkeith on 2 March 1955.
- SS Stella (1924) was a 519-ton cargo ship completed as the Swedish Ylva in September 1924, by Lödöse Varv in Lödöse, Sweden. Renamed Stella in 1960. Wrecked on 27 October 1960 off Gotland, Sweden.
- SS Stella (1933) was a 1,394-ton Danish cargo ship launched on 10 June 1933, by Helsingør Værft in Helsingør, Denmark. Broken up as Ursula Peters in Lübeck from 3 October 1964.
- SS Stella (1935 Copenhagen) was a 4,372-ton cargo ship launched as the Danish Tureby on 31 October 1935, by Burmeister & Wain in Copenhagen, Denmark. Renamed Stella in 1968. Scrapped in Hamburg, Germany, from 12 August 1969.
- SS Stella (1935 Oslo) was a 218-ton passenger ship launched as the Norwegian Fjellstrand on 28 February 1935, by Nylands Verksted in Oslo, Norway. Renamed Stella in 1958. Renamed once more before being wrecked near Kalymnos, Greece, on 26 January 1966.
- SS Stella (1943) was a 7,159-ton cargo ship completed as the Canadian Dundurn Park on 28 November 1943, by North Vancouver SR in North Vancouver, Canada. Renamed Stella in 1953. Delivered for scrapping at La Spezia, Italy, on 12 August 1965.
- SS Stella (1944) was a 7,212-ton cargo ship launched as the American Cornelius Vanderbilt on 2 February 1944, by Permanente in Richmond, California, USA. Renamed Stella in 1947. Delivered for scrapping as Spuma at Trieste, Italy, on 17 November 1967.
