= SS Oakland (1890) =

1890 General cargo/passenger ship

History

New South Wales Colony
- Name: Oakland
- Namesake: Owner's Residence, Richmond, New South Wales
- Builder: Murray Brothers, Dumbarton, Scotland
- Launched: 20 February 1890
- Sponsored by: William T Yeager
- Acquired: 1890
- In service: 27 August 1890
- Fate: Foundered, 26 May 1903

General characteristics
- Type: Coastal cargo ship
- Tonnage: 398 GRT
- Length: 154 ft (47 m) oa
- Beam: 24 ft (7.3 m)
- Draft: 10 ft 5 in (3.18 m) (max)
- Installed power: 70 hp
- Propulsion: 1 × triple-expansion Steam engine; 1 × screw
- Speed: 8-9 knots
- Complement: 17

SS Oakland was a small general cargo/passenger ship commissioned in 1890, Dumbarton, Scotland, for New South Wales, Australia, timber merchant William T Yeager. It sank off Cabbage Tree Island, New South Wales, in 1903, with the loss of 11 lives.

== Origin and early service ==
To the order of William Yeager, the small coaster Oakland was built by Murray Bros. of Dumbarton, near Glasgow, Scotland, and completed in February 1890. Under the command of Capt. Rice, it left Scotland for New South Wales on 10 May 1890, arriving Sydney on 7 August 1890. Configured purely as a general cargo carrier, she commenced her coastal trade the next month under master Capt. Benjamin Alley. By April the next year, accommodations had been added to serve passengers on her Sydney-Newcastle-Richmond River run and, by June 1896, still under the command of master Alley, she would carry as many as 30 passengers, as well as livestock, on her voyages. The vessel faced significant challenges on this service, not least being entrance to Ballina, its northern destination, only being possible across the bar at high tide.

== Incidents ==
On 23 December 1891, the Oakland ran aground on the southern breakwater at Ballina, sustaining damage. Attempts to refloat her by offloading her cargo of timber, sugar and other cargo were unsuccessful and gear was later brought in to complete the salvage. The Protector was seriously damaged in an attempt to render assistance.

In the early hours of 24 June 1893, in clear weather, the Oakland collided with the Sydney off Bird Island, near Budgewoi, New South Wales, sailing on to Newcastle with her port bow bulged in. She was operated by The Newcastle and Hunter River SS Company and mastered by Capt. Alley, though the second mate was in charge at the time. A Marine Board inquiry resulted in Alley being reprimanded for lax discipline and breach of steering and sailing rules.

In June 1895, also on its usual Sydney-to-Ballina run, a seasick steerage passenger fell overboard and drowned.

On 14 April 1897, she lost two blades of her propeller when crossing the bar at Ballina though she continued on to Sydney. She had run aground on the bar on 31 August 1896 and this was repeated on 9 August 1897, 22 August and 21 December 1898, and again at the Richmond River (probably the bar again) in July 1899. She was refloated undamaged on each occasion.

On 11 February 1901, she sustained damage and began taking on water after striking ground twice during passage between North Evans Reef and Evans Head, then, upon arrival at Ballina, she was grounded on the bar. A Marine Court held an inquiry into the incident, concluding that master William Slater was free from blame for either mishap, the first being due to an uncharted rock and the second wrong official information about the depth of water over the bar. Having been on suspension, Slater was reinstated after the finding. Second mate James Langlands was also brought before the same inquiry.

On 27 July 1901, the Oakland collided with the Sarah L Hixson on the Richmond River, Ballina. A Court of Marine Inquiry absolved the master of blame. The passenger saloon had been removed the previous year, returning her to her original pure cargo configuration.

On 26 August 1901, just three days after the court's hearing on the Hixson collision, the Oakland ran aground on the north side of the southern breakwater at the mouth of the Richmond River, causing extensive damage and was considered a total wreck. She was then under the ownership of the North Coast Steamship Navigation Company and command of Capt. Daniel Molloy. Although attempting entry some minutes after the flood tide signal had been lowered, the master was found blameless for running aground in insufficient draft by a Marine Court of Inquiry. Five days after this finding, reports of her refloat on 1 October 1901 were met with surprise by the shipping industry generally. After an extensive overhaul in Sydney, she returned to service on 16 February 1902, plying her old route to Richmond Heads. She was placed under the command of Capt. Beech.

== Foundered ==
On 27 May 1903, the Oakland met her end when she foundered in seas described as "terrific", "wild" and "mountainous", near Cabbage Tree Island. Under the temporary command of Capt. Slater, she was carrying a load principally of coal on her regular voyage from Newcastle to Richmond. The lives of Capt. Slater and 10 others were lost.

The seven survivors were plucked from a partially submerged lifeboat, holed during the mayhem of the sinking, by the SS Bellinger eight hours later.

Although no cause was found at the preliminary and formal court inquiries held into its sinking, shifting cargo was thought most likely. A large tank had been added in the aft section for carrying bulk molasses shortly before the foundering.

Ship's boy Cargill was one of the crew lost. His father, chief steward of the Maitland had also died at sea. A fundraising concert was held at Lismore on 2 September 1903 for relatives of the victims.

== As dive site ==
The remains of the vessel now lie on a sandy bottom at a maximum depth of 27 metres. It is protected under the Historic Shipwrecks Act 1976 and is considered an attractive dive site.
