= Second Battle of Manzanillo =

Naval engagement of the Spanish–American War on 1 July 1898

- Part of the Spanish–American War
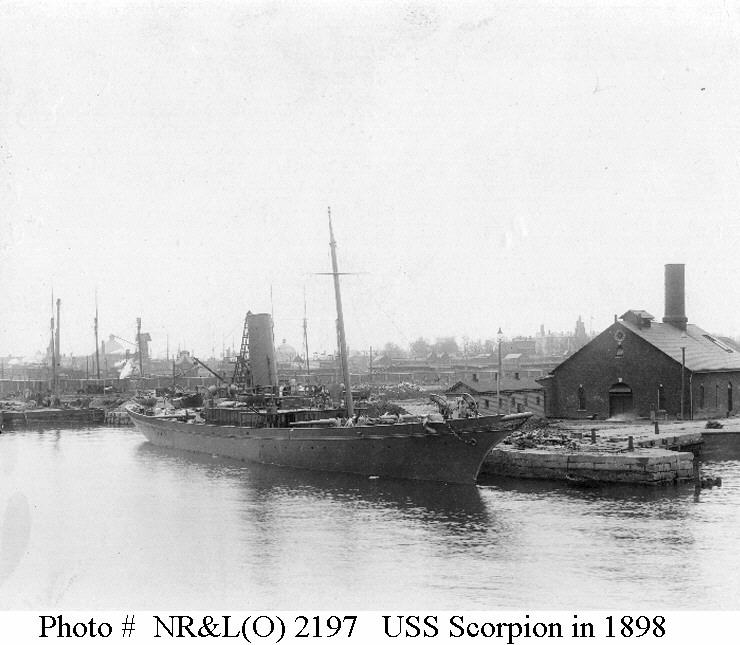
- USS Scorpion lying at anchor, circa 1898
Date	1 July 1898
Location	Manzanillo, Cuba
Result	Spanish victory

Belligerents
Spain	United States

Commanders and leaders
Joaquín Barreda	Adolph Marix

Strength
3 gunboats 3 pontoons	1 armed tug 1 patrol yacht

Casualties and losses
3 wounded	1 armed tug damaged

The Second Battle of Manzanillo was a naval engagement of the Spanish–American War on 1 July 1898. Two American gunboats attempted unsuccessfully to destroy the Spanish ships in the harbor of Manzanillo, Cuba.

== The battle ==
The USS Scorpion and Osceola arrived at Manzanillo on 1 July expecting to find an American squadron, but did not know that the squadron had fought a battle in the harbor and retired the previous day. Adolph Marix, in command, nonetheless decided to follow orders and sailed the two ships into the bay to capture or destroy any enemy shipping there. In the harbor, the American ships came across several small vessels including the 42 long tons (43 t) gunboats Estrella and Guantánamo, the 85 long tons (86 t) Delgado Parejo, and a barracks ship. The Americans then proceeded to open fire on the vessels but could not get close enough to destroy them, due to the shallow water that lay in between the harbor and the two warships. Not only did the Spanish gunboats return fire, but also infantry and artillery from the shore.

The Americans were outnumbered, and after Scorpion had been hit 12 times the attackers withdrew. Osceola was not hit and the Americans reported no casualties, while Spanish casualties were three men wounded aboard the pontoon María.

== Aftermath ==
As had occurred the day before, the Spanish had managed to repel the American squadron. Wrote one American sailor:

We have been in two of the bombardments off Santiago and helped clear the way for the troops at Daiquiri, yet we had seen nothing before to equal the accuracy, rapidity, and uniformity of the fire that the Spanish forces gave us at Manzanillo. And we give them credit for it.

Scorpion and Osceola met the American squadron which had attacked the previous day and waited for reinforcements to arrive, before finally managing to destroy the Spanish naval force at Manzanillo on 18 July.

== Order of battle ==
United States

Armed tug

- USS Osceola

Patrol yacht

- USS Scorpion

Spain

Gunboats

- Estrella
- Guantánamo
- Delgado Parejo

Pontoons

- Maria
- Cuba Española
- Guardián

== Sources ==
- Wilson, Herbert Wrigley (1900). The Downfall of Spain: Naval History of the Spanish–American War. Low, Marston and company, limited. ISBN 9780722279298.
- "GUNBOATS ENGAGE SPANIARDS". The New York Times. July 9, 1898.
- "MARIX AT MANZANILLO", The New York Times. July 25, 1898.
- Agustín Ramón Rodríguez González (1998). Operaciones de la Guerra de 1898: una revisión crítica. Actas Editorial. ISBN 84-87863-72-8.
