= List of battles of the Spanish–American War =

During the Spanish–American War, the United States Army, United States Marine Corps, and United States Navy fought 30 significant battles against the Spanish Army and Spanish Navy. (Note: This list only includes the significant battles of the Spanish–American War and not minor skirmishes.) Of these, 27 occurred in the Caribbean theater and three in the Pacific theater. The Caribbean theater consisted of two campaigns — the Puerto Rico campaign, which included ten battles, and the Cuba campaign, consisting of 17 battles — while the Pacific theater had one campaign — the Philippine campaign, with two battles — and the capture of Guam.

== Overview ==
The United States Navy battleship Maine was mysteriously sunk in Havana harbor on 15 February 1898; (Note: The cause of the Maine was later attributed to the spontaneous combustion of coal in the engine. However, at the time, the Board of Inquiry believed the sinking was caused by a mine or torpedo, and the American "Yellow Press" attributed the sinking to Spanish actions, which encouraged the public to go to war.) political pressures from the Democratic Party pushed the administration of Republican President William McKinley into a war that he had wished to avoid. Spain promised multiple times that it would reform the government of Cuba, but never delivered. The United States sent an ultimatum to Spain demanding that it surrender control of Cuba on 20 April. After the ultimatum was sent, Madrid declared war on 23 April and Washington responded with its own declaration two days later.

The main issue was Cuban independence; the ten-week war was fought in both the Caribbean and the Pacific. After the declaration of war, the U.S. Navy blockaded ports such as Havana and Cardenas. The Spanish attempted to lift the blockades on Cardenas and Matanzas, finally succeeding after failing once at Cardenas. Commodore Dewey successfully destroyed the Spanish Pacific Fleet in Manila Bay on May 1, but failed to land troops. The Navy also blockaded Puerto Rico and bombarded San Juan, but the Spanish attempted to lift this blockade, succeeding on the second attempt in June. The U.S. Marines also cut telegraph lines under the bay of Cienfuegos, but suffered heavy losses from Spanish fire. The U.S. also captured the port of Guantánamo Bay after a four-day battle, which ended on June 10.

U.S. expeditionary forces landed in Cuba on 22 June and skirmished successfully at Las Guasimas two days later. Meanwhile, the island of Guam was "captured" by the Americans, which consisted of raising of the American flag. The U.S. also attempted to land forces near Trinidad, but were repulsed by Spanish forces. The U.S. forces captured San Juan Heights, which overlooked Santiago de Cuba, after two battles at San Juan Hill and Kettle Hill, which was preceded by a smaller battle on the San Juan Hill's right flank at El Caney. The Spanish also attempted to lift the blockade on the port of Manzanillo twice, but failed both times. The Spanish fleet also attempted to escape Santiago harbor, but was destroyed by U.S. gunboats and armored cruisers. After this victory, U.S. forces laid siege to Santiago de Cuba for 14 days, until the Spanish forces surrendered, but there were several skirmishes afterwards. The Spanish managed to cut the United States blockade at Manzanillo, but the Americans sunk two Spanish ships at Nipe Bay. The Americans also tried to land at Mani-Mani, which was west of Havana, but were repulsed by the Spanish.

On 23 July, Americans landed close to the port of Ponce, Puerto Rico. Two days later, there was a small skirmish at Yauco, which was won by the Americans. The Spanish retreated and attempted to destroy rail lines to Ponce, but failed to. On 5 August, American forces marched into the town of Guayama, but the Spanish deserted the town several hours earlier. From 8 to 9 August, an American battalion captured the mountain at Coamo, Puerto Rico, on the road to the port of Ponce. At the same time, there was an inconclusive battle at Fajardo, which led to the capture and desertion of a lighthouse. One day later, the Americans captured Silva Heights. The Americans also landed near Mayaguez, and captured the town with no resistance. At the Battle of Asomante, the US forces took Asomante and captured many Spanish prisoners. At the same time, American forces also captured Manila. These two battles led to an armistice agreement, which quickly led to the Treaty of Paris, which ended the Spanish–American War.

The 1898 Treaty of Paris, which was the result of the American victory in the war, was negotiated on terms favorable to the U.S. which allowed it temporary direct control of Cuba and ceded ownership of Puerto Rico, Guam and the Philippine islands. The cession of the Philippines involved payment of $20 million ($774,000,000 today) to Spain in order to cover the Spanish infrastructure. The U.S. installed a military government in Cuba immediately after the Treaty of Paris, and eventually let it become an independent republic in 1902. The Philippines also rebelled against U.S. control, which led to the Philippine–American War lasting from 1899 to 1902. The Spanish also sold the rest of their Pacific islands to Germany under the German–Spanish Treaty.

== Caribbean Theater ==
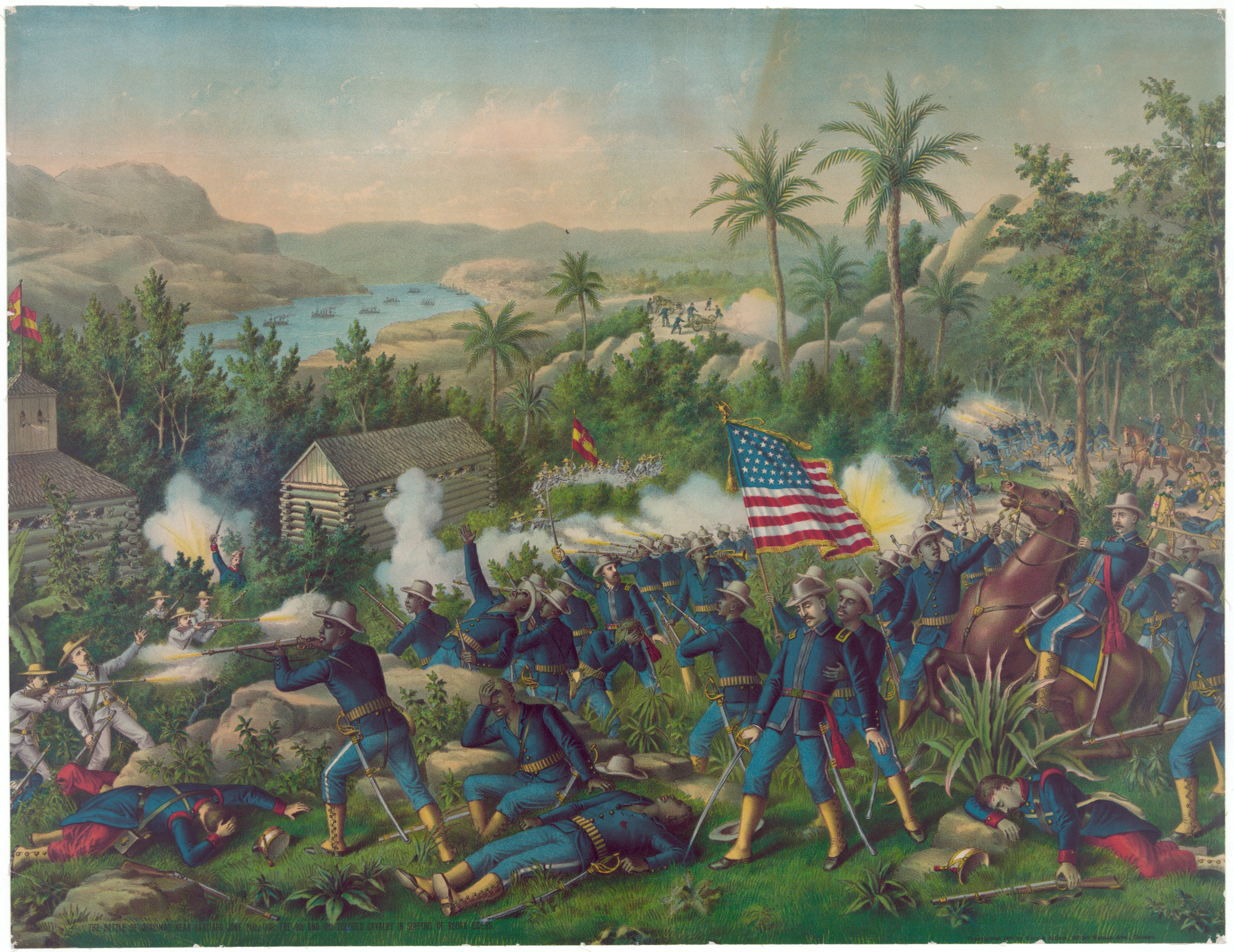
U.S. forces charging at Spanish positions during the Battle of Las Guasimas.

=== Cuba campaign ===
Battles	Date	Conclusion
Battle of Matanzas	April 25, 1898	US victory, blockades of the Spanish port of Matanzas.
First Battle of Cardenas	May 8, 1898	American victory, Spanish attempts to lift the blockade on Cuba thwarted.
Second Battle of Cardenas	May 11, 1898	Spanish victory, loosening of the blockade on Cuba.
Battle of Cienfuegos	May 11, 1898	Spanish victory. Americans cannot cut all telegraph cables intended and suffer heavy casualties.
Battle of Guantánamo Bay	June 6–10, 1898	American victory, capture of Guantánamo Bay.
Battle of Las Guasimas	June 24, 1898	American victory, town of Sevilla captured.
Battle of Tayacoba	June 30, 1898	Spanish victory, Americans fail to land troops.
First Battle of Manzanillo	June 30, 1898	Spanish victory, American gunboats fail to capture Manzanillo harbor.
Battle of El Caney	July 1, 1898	Inconclusive. American forces succeeded on capturing El Caney fort and protecting the right flank at San Juan Hill, but suffered delays and heavy casualties.
Second Battle of Manzanillo	July 1, 1898	Spanish victory, a second attempt to capture Manzanillo harbor fails.
Battle of San Juan Hill	July 1, 1898	American/Cuban victory, capture of San Juan heights.
Battle of Aguacate	July 1, 1898	Cuban victory, many Spanish forces continue retreat to Santiago.
Battle of Santiago de Cuba	July 3, 1898	American victory, destruction of six Spanish ships escaping from Santiago harbor.
Siege of Santiago de Cuba	July 3–17, 1898	American/Cuban victory, surrender of the city of Santiago de Cuba.
Third Battle of Manzanillo	July 18, 1898	American victory, destruction of Spanish squadron in Manzanillo harbor.
Battle of Nipe Bay	July 21, 1898	American victory, sinking of two Spanish ships.
Battle of Mani-Mani	July 23, 1898	Spanish victory, American landing fails.

=== Puerto Rico campaign ===
Battle	Date	Conclusion
Bombardment of San Juan	May 12, 1898	Spanish defenses damaged.
Second Battle of San Juan	June 22, 1898	US victory, Spanish attempts to break U.S. blockade fails.
Third Battle of San Juan	June 28, 1898	Spanish resupply attempts succeed.
Battle of Yauco	July 25, 1898	US victory, Spanish forces retreat and fail to destroy rail lines.
Battle of Guayama	August 5, 1898	US victory, capture of Guayama
Battle of Coamo	August 8–9, 1898	US victory, capture of Coamo.
Battle of Fajardo	August 8–9, 1898	Inconclusive.
Battle of Silva Heights	August 10, 1898	US victory, capture of Silva Heights.
Battle of Mayaguez	August 11, 1898	US victory, Spanish forces retreated before the US forces arrived.
Battle of Asomante	August 9–13, 1898	US victory, capture of Asomante. This led to the end of the war in Puerto Rico and the end of the Spanish–American War.

== Pacific Theater ==
=== Philippine campaign ===
Battle	Date	Conclusion
Battle of Manila Bay	May 1, 1898	Decisive American victory, destruction of Spanish Navy′s Pacific squadron.
Battle of Manila	August 13, 1898	American-Filipino victory, capture of Manila. This led to the end of the war in the Philippines and the end of the Spanish–American War.

=== Capture of Guam ===
Battle	Date	Conclusion
Capture of Guam	June 20–21, 1898	Bloodless US victory, capture of Guam from the Spanish.
