= Grace Filkins =

American stage actress

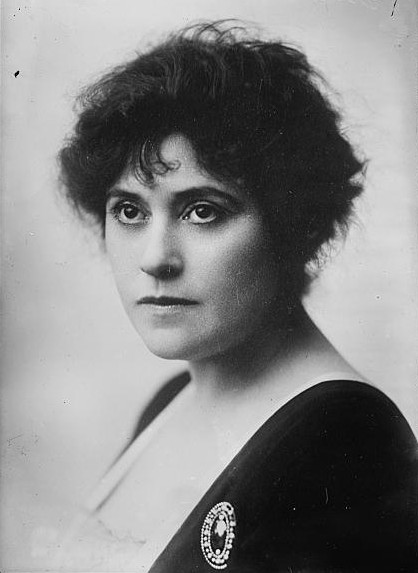
Grace Filkins

Grace Filkins (June 3, 1865 – September 16, 1962) was an American stage actress.

== Early life ==
Grace Sweetman was born in Philadelphia, Pennsylvania. Her father was a rabbi.

== Career ==
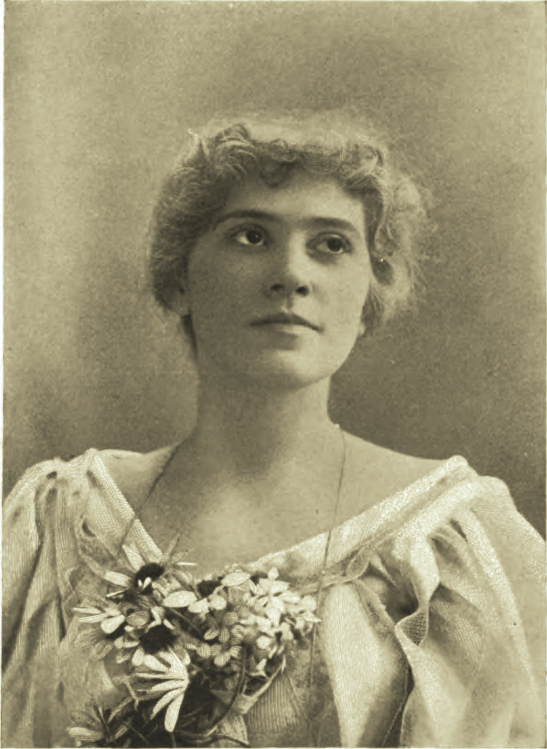
Grace Filkins

Filkins started performing in variety shows, and in the companies of Augustin Daly and Helena Modjeska.

She had a long career on Broadway, appearing in shows from 1894 to 1931, including The Passing Show (1894), The Royal Box (1897-1898), The Brixton Burglary (1901), The Lady Across the Hall (1905), The School for Husbands (1905), The Daughters of Men (1906-1907), The Third Degree (1909), Drifting (1910), Rita Coventry (1923), Head or Tail (1926), and finally appearing in In the Best of Families (1931). "I would be glad to be called an intellectual actress," she told an interviewer in 1910. "I should like to deserve to be called that." In 1900, a non-alcoholic cocktail was named for Grace Wilkins, consisting of lemon juice and sarsaparilla.

She left the Rosina Vokes Company in 1892, and sued them for lost salary, citing mistreatment by fellow actor Felix Morris. She later sued actress Marie Dressler and her husband, and playwright Preston Gibson.

She was active and visible as a military wife, even as she continued her career on the stage. She spoke of becoming a Red Cross nurse in 1898. In 1909 she was appointed to head a women's committee working to raise the Maine. She took several years' leave from the stage and traveled to the Philippines while her husband was stationed there.

== Personal life ==
Grace Sweetman was married and widowed twice, and had one daughter. Her first husband was Robert J. Filkins, a theatrical manager; she was widowed when he died in 1886. Her second husband was Adolph Marix, a naval officer; they married in 1896. She was widowed again when Adolph died in 1919. Grace Filkins died in 1962, aged 97 years, in New York City. Her gravesite is with her second husband's, in Arlington National Cemetery.

Grace Filkins' daughter, Lydia Filkins, married conductor Nikolai Sokoloff in 1911; they divorced in 1936.
