= Adolph Marix =

German-born American officer in the United States Navy

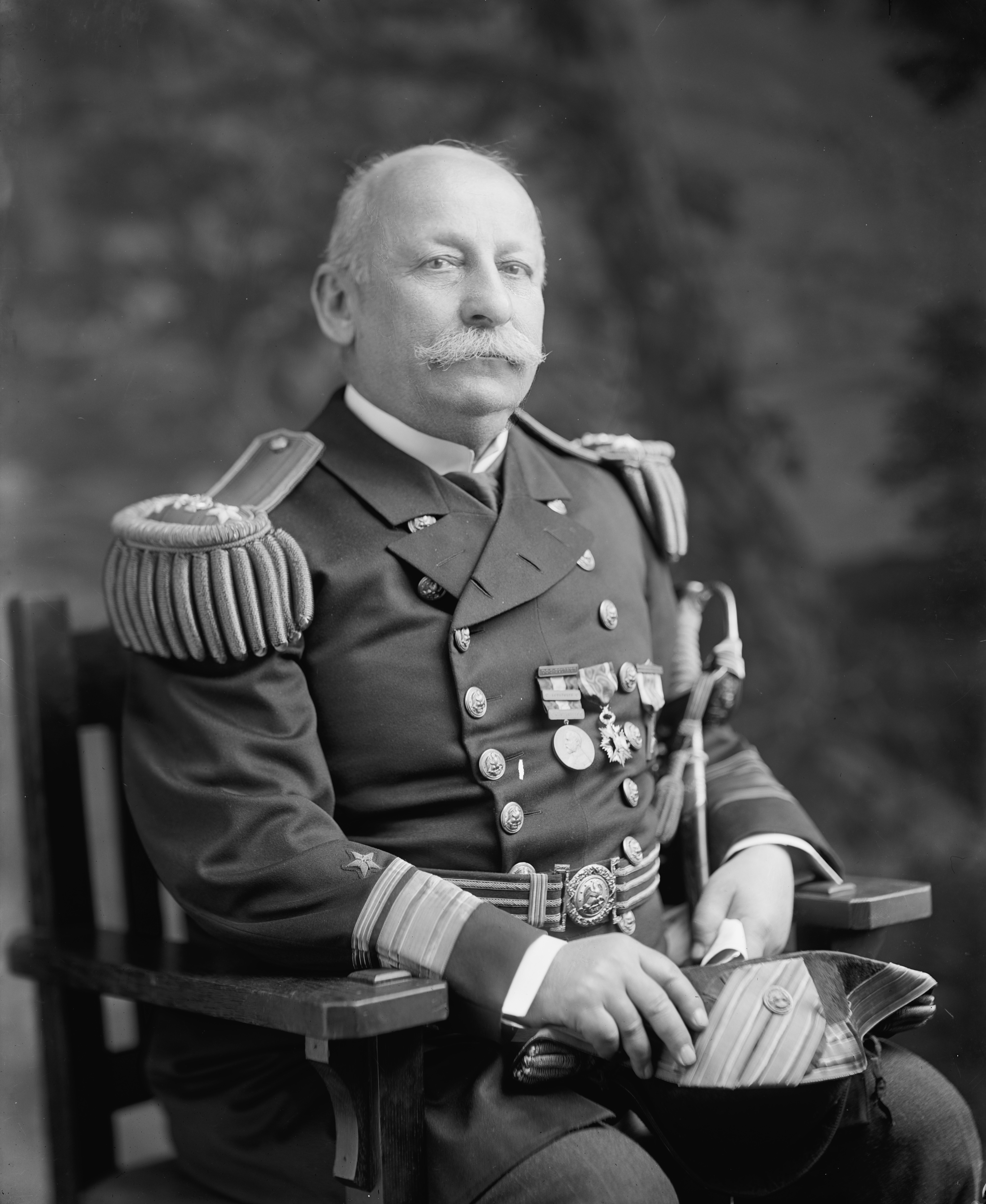
- Born: April 24, 1848; Saxony
- Died: June 11, 1919 (aged 71); United States
- Burial place: Arlington National Cemetery
- Military career
- Allegiance: United States of America
- Branch: United States Navy
- Service years: 1868–1919
- Rank: Vice admiral
- Commands: USS Scorpion
- Conflicts: Spanish–American War: Second Battle of Manzanillo; Third Battle of Manzanillo

Adolph Marix (April 24, 1848 – June 11, 1919), was a German-born American officer in the United States Navy, who served in the Spanish–American War. The former executive officer of the battleship USS Maine, he served as recorder on the 1898 court of inquiry which investigated the ship's explosion. He eventually rose to the rank of vice admiral. In 1868, he had been the first Jewish graduate from the US Naval Academy at Annapolis.

== Early life and career ==
Born in the Kingdom of Saxony in 1848, Marix immigrated as a boy with his family to the United States. In 1864, he entered the United States Naval Academy at Annapolis, Maryland, graduating in 1868. He was the first Jewish graduate of the Naval Academy.

In 1869 he was promoted to the rank of ensign, and in the following year was assigned to special duty on the USS Congress. He was promoted master in 1870, served on the USS Canandaigua with the North Atlantic Squadron during 1871–1872, was commissioned lieutenant in 1872, and served thereafter on various ships in the North Atlantic and Asiatic stations until 1879, when he was assigned to service in the Hydrographic Office. In 1880 he was ordered to the training ship USS Minnesota, from which, in 1882, he was transferred to the sloop-of-war USS Brooklyn, then with the South Atlantic Squadron.

From 1883 to 1886 he served on the Asiatic station, after which he was assigned to special service in the Judge Advocate General's office. In connection with his duties in this department, he was sent to Australia (1888). On his return (1889), he was assigned to the recently re-commissioned training-ship USS Jamestown, from which he (1892) was transferred to the Hydrographic Office in New York City.

== USS Maine ==
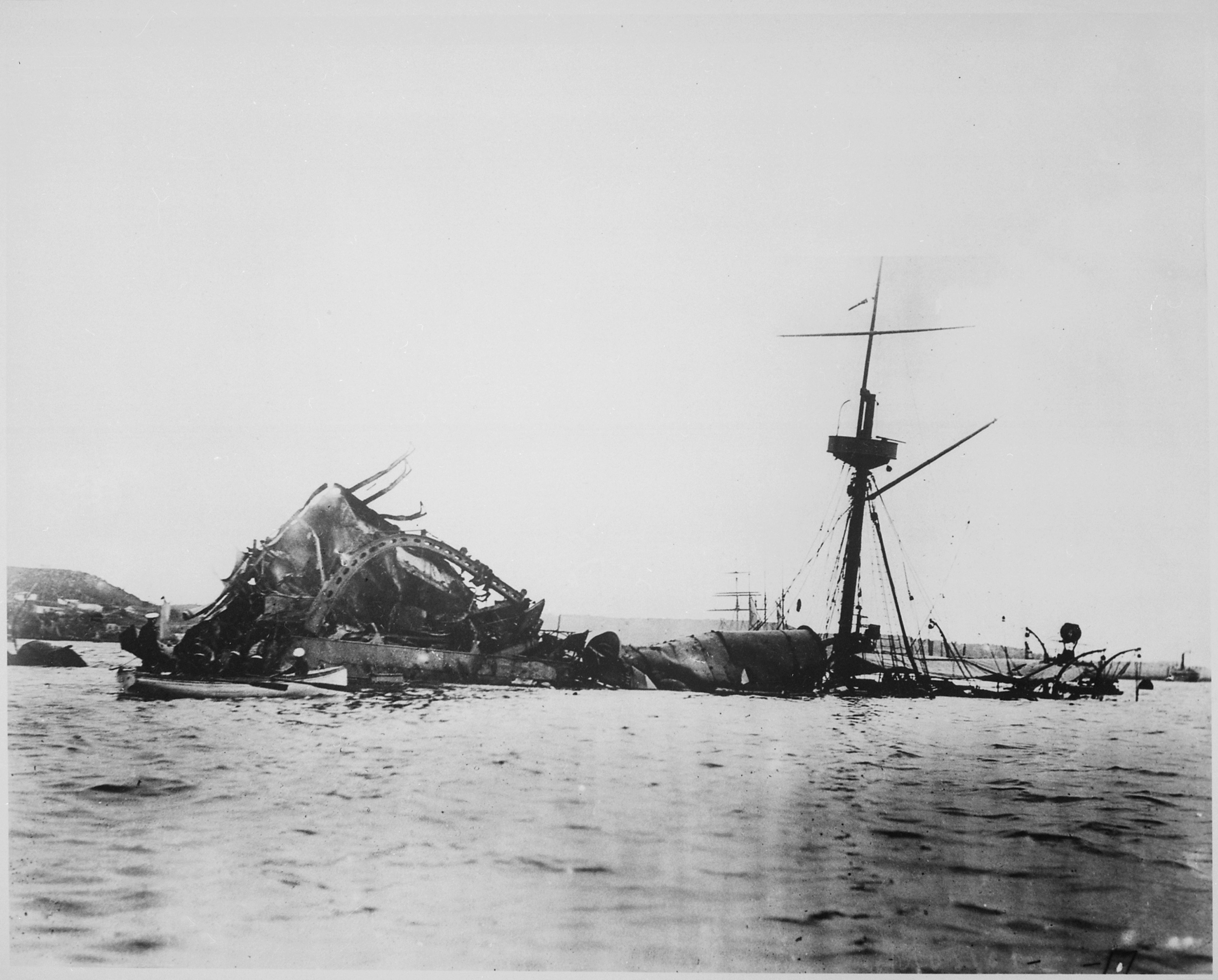
Wreckage of the Maine, 1898

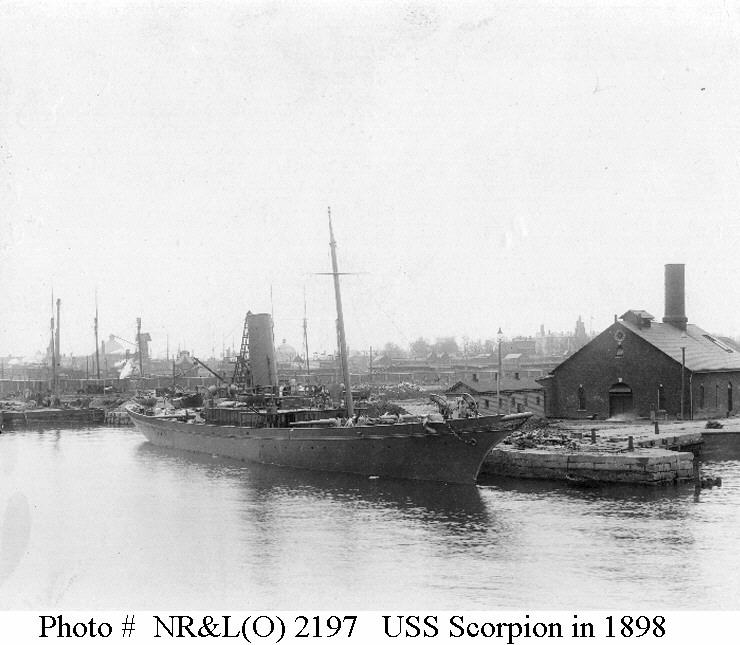
The Scorpion

In 1893 he was promoted to lieutenant commander and assigned to the receiving ship USS Minnesota. In 1895 he was transferred to the battleship USS Maine, on which he served until January 1898, when it was damaged in an explosion. He took command of the USS Scorpion. He served as recorder of the Maine court of inquiry. In March 1899, he was promoted to the rank of commander.

By act of Congress, Commander Marix was advanced two numbers for "eminent and conspicuous conduct" in battle during two engagements at Manzanillo. The actions were, the Second Battle of Manzanillo and the Third Battle of Manzanillo, during the Spanish–American War. For his actions, he was promoted to vice admiral.

In 1896 Marix married actress Grace Filkins.

He died on June 11, 1919, in the U.S.

== See also ==
- Spanish–American War
- Simeon Magruder Levy, first Jewish graduate of the United States Military Academy, class of 1802
