= Simeon Magruder Levy =

- Born: January 1774; Pennsylvania
- Died: March 1807 (aged 33); Georgia
- Military career
- Allegiance: United States of America
- Branch: United States Army
- Service years: 1793–1805
- Rank: Second Lieutenant (USA)
- Nickname: "Simon"
- Conflicts: Battle of Maumee Rapids

Simeon Magruder Levy (January 1774 – March 1807), also known as Simon Levy, (Note: Levy is known to have signed his name as "Simeon", but records often record his name as "Simon".) was an officer in the United States Army. He was the second overall graduate and first Jewish graduate of the United States Military Academy (West Point).

== Early life ==
Levy was born in January 1774 in Pennsylvania. (Note: Jewish male infants are usually circumcised on the 8th day. Levy's circumcision was on January 25, 1774 (a Tuesday in the Georgian calendar), so he was most likely born on Tuesday, January 18, 1774.) His parents were Levy Andrew Levy, a fur trader and land speculator, and his wife Susanna [Simon]. The boy's birth date is not documented, but his bris (ritual circumcision), which is usually done on the eighth day, was performed on January 25, 1774 in Lancaster, Pennsylvania. In the 1790 US Census Andrew Levy was a resident of Washington County Maryland The Levy family moved to Baltimore, Maryland circa 1799.

Levy joined the United States Army as a sergeant in 1793, and distinguished himself at the Battle of Maumee Rapids (also known as the Battle of Fallen Timbers) on August 20, 1794 as an Orderly sergeant. His commanding officer, Captain Benjamin Lockwood, recommended Levy as a cadet for the newly founded United States Military Academy (USMA) at West Point, New York.

== Later life ==
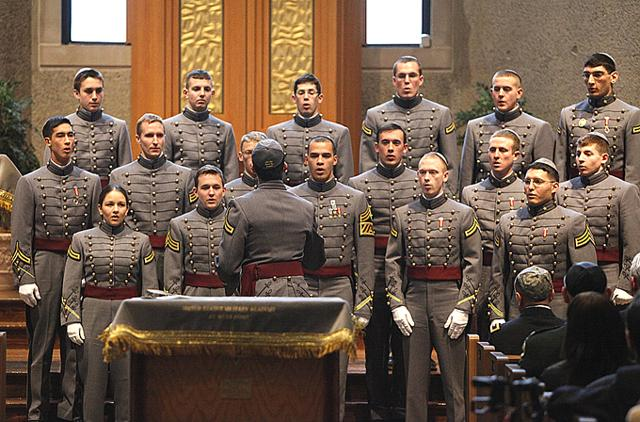
West Point Jewish Chapel Cadet Choir celebrating the chapel's 25th anniversary.

Levy entered West Point on March 2, 1801, accepted due to merit and skill in mathematics, and graduated second in a class of two cadets on October 12, 1802. His classmate was Joseph Gardner Swift. Levy may have first served as an instructor at West Point, then served as an engineer at Fort James Jackson and Fort Wilkinson Fort Wilkinson, Georgia.

He became ill and resigned his commission on September 30, 1805. He died in March 1807 in Georgia. His place of burial is uncertain.

He was the second individual and the first Jew to graduate from West Point. The West Point Jewish Chapel was built at the academy beginning in 1982; it opened on November 13, 1984. As of 2009, over 900 Jews have graduated from the USMA.

== See also ==
- Adolph Marix, first Jewish graduate of the United States Naval Academy, class of 1868
