= Third Battle of Manzanillo =

- Part of the Spanish–American War
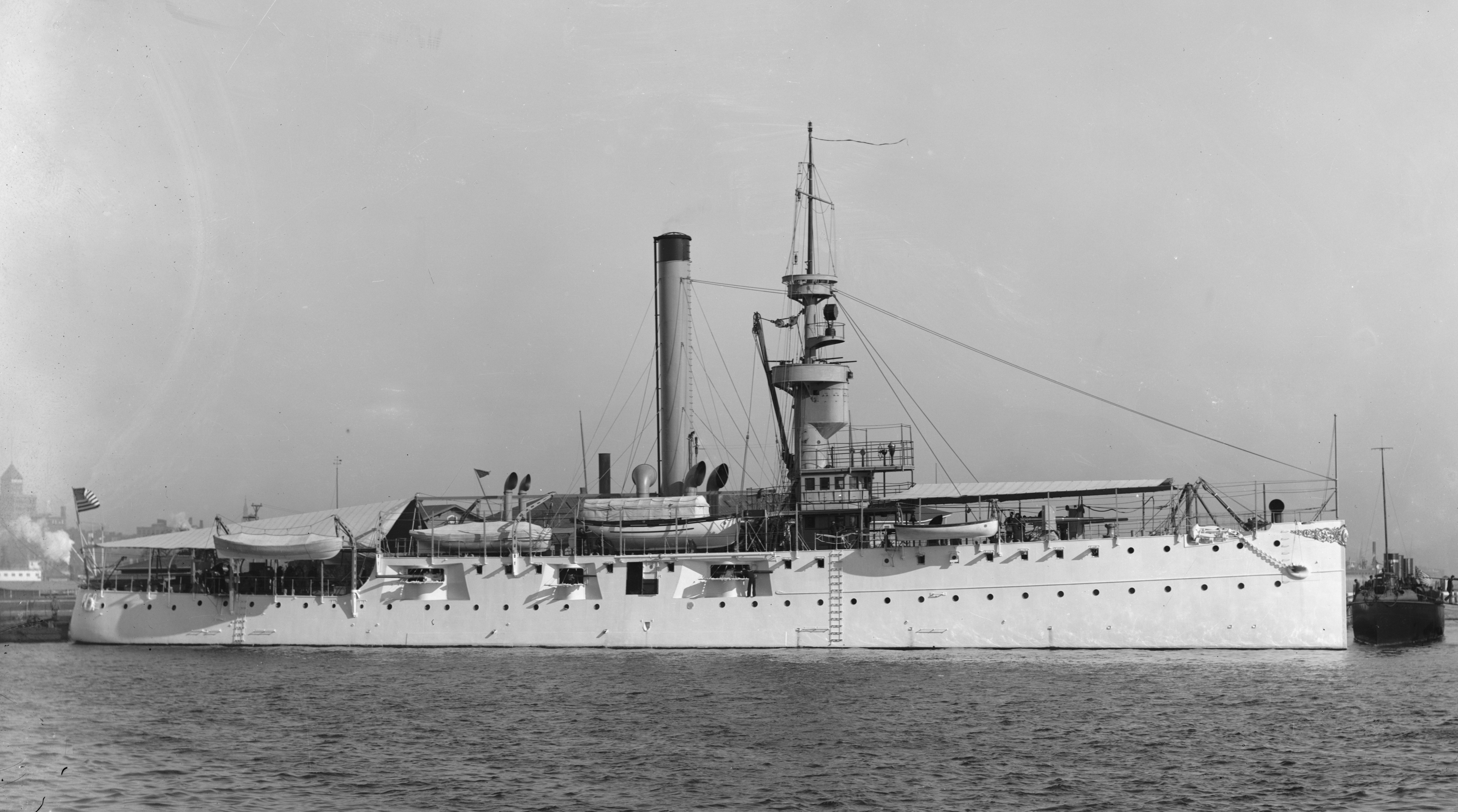
- USS Helena lying at anchor, circa 1897-1901
Date	July 18, 1898
Location	Manzanillo, Cuba
Result	American victory

Belligerents
United States	Spain

Commanders and leaders
Chapman C. Todd; Adolph Marix	Joaquín Barreda

Strength
4 gunboats 2 armed tugs 1 patrol yacht	4 gunboats 3 pontoons 3 transports 3 field guns 3 battalions of infantry

Casualties and losses
1 armed tug damaged	3 killed 14 wounded 4 gunboats destroyed 3 pontoons destroyed 3 transports destroyed

The Third Battle of Manzanillo was a naval engagement that occurred on July 18, 1898, between an American fleet commanded by Chapman C. Todd against a Spanish fleet led by Joaquín Gómez de Barreda, during the Spanish–American War. The significantly more powerful United States Navy squadron, consisting of four gunboats, two armed tugs and a patrol yacht, overpowered a Royal Spanish Navy squadron which consisted of four gunboats, three pontoon used as floating batteries, and three transports, sinking or destroying all the Spanish ships present without losing a single ship of their own. Following the destruction of their fleet, the Spanish hold-out on Manzanillo was bombarded, leading to the city's surrender and the end of Spanish presence on the island.

== Background ==
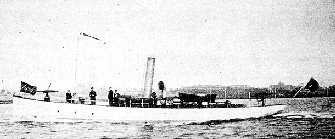
A Spanish gunboat during the Spanish-American War, similar to the kind utilised at Manzanillo.

Upon the outbreak of war, the United States Navy had placed a blockade around the island of Cuba, both to assist the local revolutionaries fighting against Spanish rule, and to hamper Spanish efforts to resist the American expeditionary forces by ensuring they could not move around men and supplies to areas which required them. Several ports in Cuba, such as Cárdenas and Cienfuegos had already seen several unsuccessful attempts by the Americans to attack the ports, with the Battle of Cárdenas proving to be the most costly American failure. Spanish blockade runners would move from port to port to skirt the American blockade, bringing vital men and material to Spanish soldiers engaged in combat with the Cubans. The port of Manzanillo had been a refuge for Spanish troop transports and blockade runners (many of which were requisitioned merchant steamships) since the outbreak of war, and the United States Navy had already dispatched two reconnaissance expeditions to the harbor to determine its defenses.

The first expedition, consisting of the gunboats USS Hist and USS Hornet, alongside the armed tug USS Wompatuck under the command of Lucien Young, attempted to clear the harbor of the Spanish vessels. While Young's force knocked the Spanish gunboat Centinela out of action on its approach to the harbor, accurate fire from other Spanish gunboats within the harbor, Estrella, Guantánamo, and the Delgado Parejo forced an American withdrawal, with only three casualties and damaged vessels to show for their efforts. The second expedition, led by Adolph Marix and consisting of the USS Scorpion and Osceola, launched their attack unaware of the fate of the first expedition, and were similarly repulsed by the Parrott guns of the Spanish gunboats. Wrote one American sailor:

We have been in two of the bombardments off Santiago and helped clear the way for the troops at Daiquiri, yet we had seen nothing before to equal the accuracy, rapidity, and uniformity of the fire that the Spanish forces gave us at Manzanillo. And we give them credit for it.

Although a number of awards were given for these actions, they proved that the presence of the Spanish vessels and shore batteries were not going to be easy to overcome, and two gunboats were accordingly dispatched to aid the American vessels, the two being the USS Wilmington and USS Helena. The commanding officer of the Wilmington, Chapman Coleman Todd, became commander of the now seven-vessel strong American force, and moved to clear the harbor of Spanish vessels. Todd ordered his vessels to be split up into three groups, with the two gunboats Wilmington and Helena being ordered to enter the harbor via a channel on the northern side of the bay and attacking from the left, Osceola and Scorpion being ordered to attack from a channel directly opposite the city, and the Wompatuck, Hist and Hornet being ordered to move in from the right through one of the bays southern channels. All three of the American squadrons were instructed to time their passages through the channels to enter the bay concurrently. The reason behind the division of the squadron was to prevent any Spanish vessels from escaping by blocking their escape routes.

== Battle ==
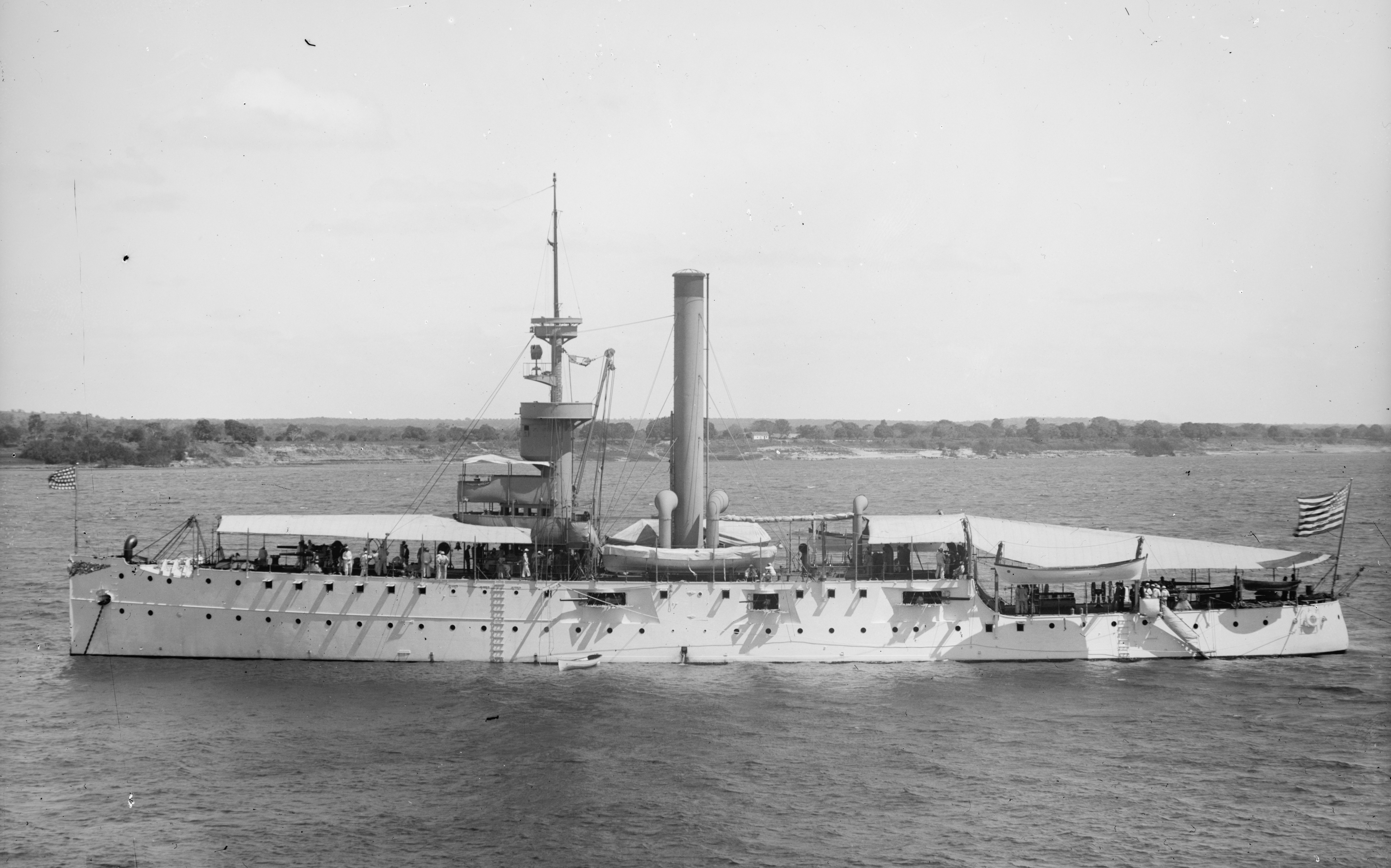
USS Wilmington on the Orinoco River in Venezuela.

At 07:00am, the seven American warships began to approach the harbor of Manzanillo, having rendezvoused at Guayabal the night before. Just four minutes later the battle began when Spanish shore batteries noticed the approaching Americans and began firing at them, although they scored no hits. Some fifteen minutes later, the Scorpion and Osceola replied by opening fire on the shore batteries, although they likewise were unable to score any hits. At 07:50am, the Americans sighted the three Spanish transports lying at anchor, these being the El Gloria, Jose Garcia and El Purísima Concepción. El Gloria and Jose Garcia were merchant steamers used for transporting troops while the El Purísima Concepción was a blockade runner. All three vessels were destroyed over a two and a half hour period by the Americans, who were careful to remain out of the range of the Spanish batteries.

Upon seeing the plight of their fellow vessels, several Spanish gunboats set sail and moved to repulse the American warships, however they found themselves being repulsed and forced to retreat further inside the harbor due to being outgunned. Hist, Hornet, and Wompatuck pursued the gunboats to their moorings and engaged them. The American vessels continued their advance into the harbor, but they soon ran into issues with the shallow depth of Manzanillo's bay, forcing them to reconnoiter passages so that the deeper-drafted gunboats, the Wilmington and the Helena, would not beach themselves accidentally. Advancing upon the Spanish positions, Todd realised that his forces were focusing too much of their fire upon transports taking refuge in the harbor alongside the immobile pontoon present, the hulk and storeship Maria, and ordered the Helena to switch to targeting the cornered gunboats instead of assisting the Willmington with finishing the transports and pontoon off.

With the transports and pontoons destroyed, all the American efforts were switched to finishing off the badly damaged gunboats. One by one, the four gunboats were finished off, with three being destroyed, one being sunk and another beaching itself before sinking later. At 10:22am, just three hours after initiating the engagement, Todd gave the order to withdraw from the harbor. On their way out, much as they had done on their way in, they made sure to keep out of the range of the Spanish batteries, who had helplessly watched the battle unfold. During the battle, Todd had noted the good performance of the officers serving under him, and stated as such in his battle report to Sampson:

All of our vessels were handled with sound discretion and excellent judgment by the several commanding officers, which was to have been expected from the men commanding the vessels of this force.

== Aftermath ==
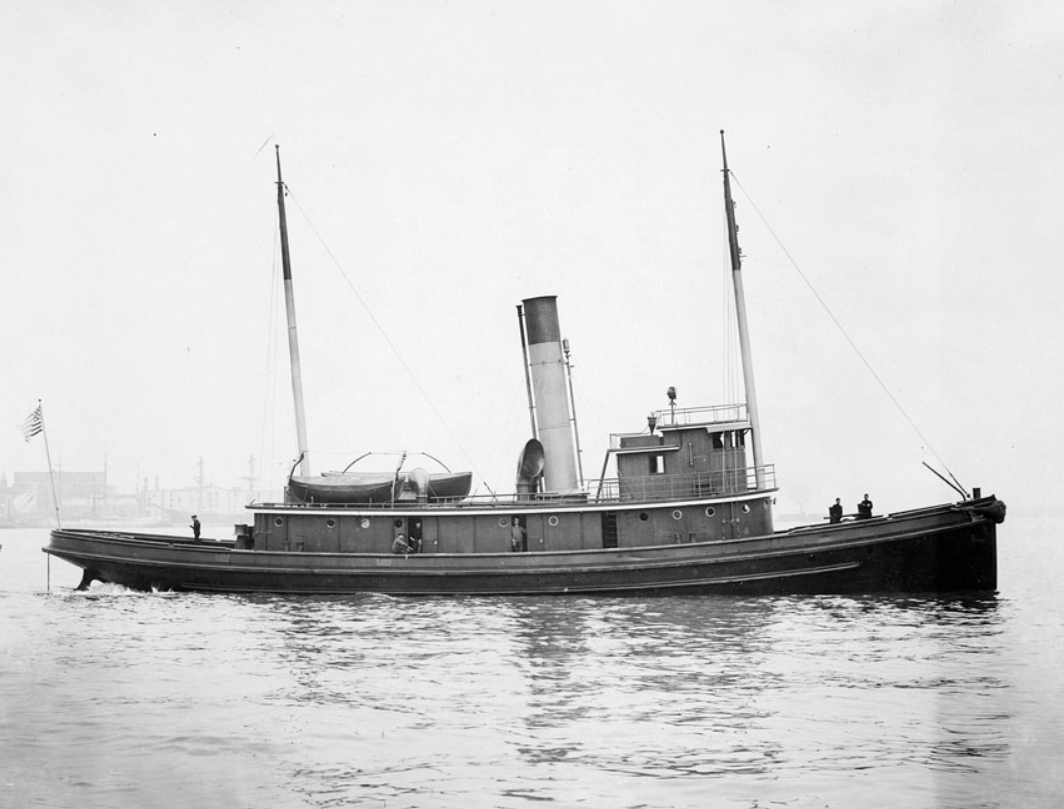
The USS Wompatuck underway, 20 April 1899.

By 10:35am, the battle had been concluded. The Spanish squadron had been entirely destroyed, suffering casualties of three men killed, fourteen men wounded, four gunboats sunk or destroyed and three transports and pontoons burned to the waterline, while the Americans, on the other hand, had suffered no casualties. The only significant damage incurred by the American force was a three-pounder gun that broke loose from its rivets on the Wompatuck, though one of USS Wilmington's guns was disabled due to Spanish gunfire for a few minutes. The threat posed by the Spanish flotilla was eliminated, and the American squadron returned victorious to the main fleet. The Wompatuck, however, left the rest of the warships and instead sailed towards at Guantánamo Bay where the Americans had established a base after their victory at the Battle of Guantánamo Bay to bring Admiral William T. Sampson news of the latest American victory.

During the battle, the Americans took great care to ensure that their gunfire did not target the city, and in the words of Todd, "so far as could be observed, little, if any, was done." Although the Spanish naval presence in Manzanillo was eliminated, the Spanish defenders in the town stubbornly refused to relinquish control to either the Americans or the Cubans, and even without a naval presence, it took a U.S. Navy bombardment of the town combined with Cuban rebels storming the town for the Spanish to finally surrender the town, when they learnt of the ceasefire that resulted in the end of the war. Manzanillo would be the last town to surrender in Cuba during the war and the last engagement which took place on the island. Four days after the battle, on the 22nd of July, the New York Times published news of the victory to the American public.

== Bibliography ==
- Everett, Marshall (1899). Exciting Experiences in Our Wars with Spain and the Filipinos. Book Publishers Union.
- "Naval Operations Manzanillo". Naval History and Heritage Command.
- How Todd Sunk Seven Ships (PDF). July 22, 1898.
- Marix at Manzanillo (PDF). July 25, 1898.
- McKinley, William (1899). The Abridgement. United States Government Publishing Office.
- Sigsbee, Charles Dwight (1899). The United States Navy in the Spanish-American War of 1898, Vol. 1: Narratives of the Chief Events by U. S. Naval Officers. Forgotten Books. ISBN 978-0267964383.
- Villafaña, Frank R. (2012). Expansionism: Its Effects on Cuba's Independence. Routledge. ISBN 978-1412843089.
- Dyal, Donald H. (1996). Historical Dictionary of the Spanish American War. Greenwood Publishing Group. ISBN 978-0313288524.
- Tucker, Spencer C. (2009). The Encyclopedia of the Spanish-American and Philippine-American Wars: A Political, Social, and Military History. ABC-Clio. ISBN 978-1851099511.
- Knight, Peter (2003). Conspiracy Theories in American History: An Encyclopedia: Conspiracy Theories in American History: An Encyclopedia. ABC-Clio. ISBN 978-1576078129.
