= USS Scorpion (PY-3) =

US Navy yacht

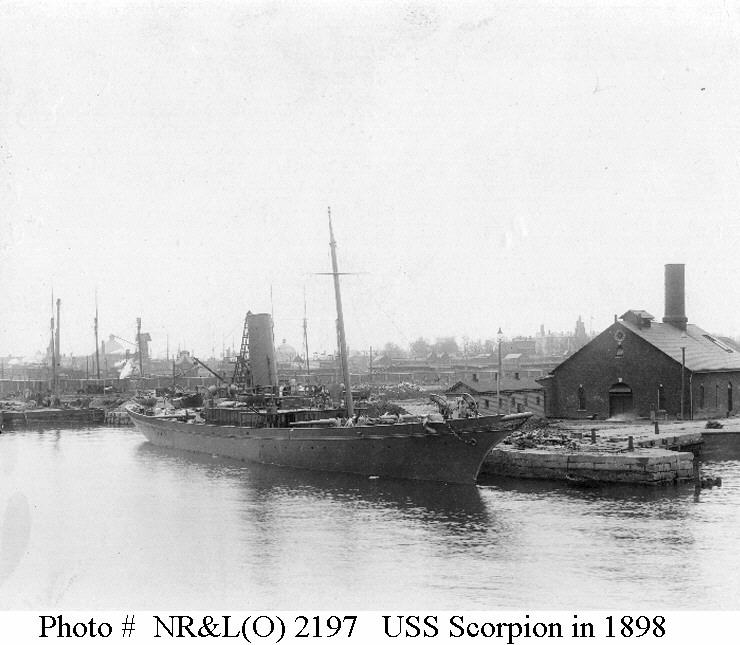
- USS Scorpion (PY-3) at the New York Navy Yard, Brooklyn, New York, c. April 1898

History
- Name: Sovereign
- Port of registry: (United States)
- Builder: John N. Robins, South Brooklyn, New York
- Completed: 1896
- Fate: Sold to U.S. Navy 7 April 1898
- Notes: Private yacht

United States
- Name: Scorpion
- Namesake: Scorpions, an order of arachnids having an elongated body and a narrow segmented tail bearing a venomous sting at the tip.
- Acquired: 7 April 1898
- Commissioned: 11 April 1898
- Decommissioned: 14 January 1899
- Recommissioned: 22 August 1899
- Decommissioned: 24 July 1901
- Recommissioned: 1 July 1902
- Decommissioned: 27 October 1927
- Stricken: 23 March 1929
- Fate: Sold 25 June 1929

General characteristics
- Type: Armed yacht 1898–1899; Gunboat 1899–1927
- Displacement: 775 long tons (787 t)
- Length: 212 ft 10 in (64.87 m)
- Beam: 28 ft 1 in (8.56 m)
- Draft: 11 ft (3.4 m)
- Installed power: 2 × triple expansion; 2500 IHP
- Propulsion: Twin screw
- Speed: 14 kn (16 mph; 26 km/h)
- Complement: 90
- Armament: 4 × 57 mm (2.24 in) 6-pounder guns

The fourth USS Scorpion was a steam yacht in commission in the United States Navy from 1898 to 1899, 1899 to 1901, and 1902 to 1927.

== Construction and acquisition ==
Scorpion was built in 1896 as Sovereign, a two-masted schooner-rigged, 775-ton, steel steam yacht, for M.C.D. Borden by John N. Robins, South Brooklyn, New York. She was powered by a pair of triple expansion steam engines, with cylinders of 15, 24 and 39 inches by 21-inch stroke, built by the W. & A. Fletcher Co. of Hoboken, New Jersey. Steam was supplied by two Babcock & Wilcox boilers at a working pressure of 225 pounds. The engines reportedly developed 2500 indicated horsepower and in an 1896 race with the steamer Monmouth—said to be the second fastest steamer in New York—Sovereign won handily.

The U.S. Navy purchased her on 7 April 1898 for service in the Spanish–American War. Renamed USS Scorpion, she was commissioned on 11 April 1898 with Lieutenant Commander Adolph Marix in command.

== Service history ==
=== Spanish–American War ===
Following commissioning, Scorpion proceeded to Hampton Roads, Virginia, where she joined the Flying Squadron on 1 May 1898 and prepared for duty in the Caribbean. On 22 May, she arrived with the squadron off Cienfuegos, Cuba, then continued on to the Santiago de Cuba area with dispatches for ships scouting off that port. On 25 May, she returned to Cienfuegos, patrolled there on blockade duty until the next day, then departed for Key West, Florida, for coal and water.

On 7 June, Scorpion headed south, escorted a provisions ship and an ammunition ship to Santiago de Cuba, then, until 22 June, performed blockade duties off the harbor there. On 22 June, she assisted in clearing the beach at Daiquirí in preparation for a United States Army landing and, on 23 June, carried out a similar mission at Siboney. On 24 June, she resumed blockade duties off Santiago de Cuba. On 30 June, she shifted to Cape Cruz, and on 1 July she joined the armed tug Osceola in an unsuccessful attack on Spanish gunboats in Manzanillo harbor. After the attack, she retired to waters off the entrance, captured a provisions lighter, and patrolled there until 5 July.

Scorpion then proceeded to Guantanamo Bay for water, coal, provisions, and ammunition. She returned to Manzanillo on 11 July, and, on 18 July, participated in another attack that destroyed all Spanish Government vessels then in the harbor.

After the second attack on Manzanillo, Scorpion resumed blockade duties, continued them until 3 August, then returned to Guantanamo Bay, whence she carried dispatches for the remainder of the war, which ended on 13 August.

=== Pre-World War I ===
On 27 November, Scorpion departed Cuban waters. A month later, she arrived at New York and, on 14 January 1899, she was decommissioned in preparation for conversion to a gunboat.

Recommissioned on 22 August 1899, Scorpion was assigned to the Isthmian Canal Commission and ordered to Central America. Into the spring of 1900, she remained in the Caribbean as the Commission investigated the proposed canal routes. A report from February 1900 has her visiting Kingston, Jamaica, during a visit to that island of the British North America and West Indies Squadron. In June 1900, she returned to the United States, operated off the U.S. northeast coast into the autumn of 1900, then resumed operations in the Caribbean. From November 1900 to May 1901, she cruised off Hispaniola. In June 1901, she arrived at Boston, Massachusetts, and on 24 July 1901 she was again decommissioned.

On 1 July 1902, Scorpion was recommissioned and assigned to the North Atlantic Squadron. On 2 September 1903 she collided with H. M. Whitney in the East River with considerable damage done to both vessels. For the next six years, she carried dispatches and personnel, conducted hydrographic surveys, and participated in exercises along the United States East Coast and in the Caribbean, operating primarily off Santo Domingo during 1906 and 1907.

Ordered to the Mediterranean in 1908, Scorpion sailed from Philadelphia, Pennsylvania, on 22 October 1908. On 4 December 1908, she arrived at Constantinople in the Ottoman Empire to take up duties as station ship, but she was ordered to Messina, Italy to assist in relief efforts for the survivors of an earthquake there. She supported International Medical Service efforts from 3–8 January 1909, then steamed back to the Ottoman Empire. From 10 February-15 July, she was at Naples, Italy, for repairs. She returned to Constantinople on 20 July and assumed station ship duties, which included work for the U.S. Embassy. From 27 November 1910 – 28 January 1912, she was at Trieste in Austria-Hungary for extensive repairs, and in February 1912 she returned to Constantinople. In August 1912, she assisted earthquake victims in the Ottoman Empire and, in October 1912, as the First Balkan War broke out, she commenced operations to assist Americans caught in disputed areas.

On 18 November, the Diplomatic Corps resident in Constantinople decided to land 2,500 men and 26 guns to protect foreign residents and their interests from rioting. In addition to detachments from British, French, German, Italian, and Russian warships, Scorpion landed a small detail to guard the U.S. Legation. The men from Scorpion reembarked on 3 December.

Throughout the First Balkan War, which lasted six months, and the Second Balkan War, which followed in the summer of 1913, Scorpion continued to protect American interests. After the two wars, she assisted the international commissions which gave aid to refugees and displaced persons.

=== World War I ===
World War I began in August 1914, and in November 1914 the Ottoman Empire entered it on the side of the Central Powers. During the first years of the war, the Ottoman government held Scorpion at Constantinople. The U.S. entered the war on the side of the Allies on 6 April 1917, and, on 11 April 1917 the Ottoman government interned Scorpion. Under Ottoman Turkish guard from 15 November 1917, she was allowed to assist British personnel released from prisoner-of-war camps in the interior of the Ottoman Empire during late October 1918. Under the Armistice of Mudros of 30 October 1918, the participation of the Ottoman Empire in World War I ended on 31 October 1918, and on 9 November 1918, the Ottoman Empire allowed Scorpion under Lieutenant Commander Herbert S. Babbitt to resume her previous activities and soon thereafter she began assisting the many refugees in the area. On 18 December 1918, Commander Elmer W. Tod relieved Babbitt in command of the Scorpion. Babbitt had not only befriended Talaat Pasha, the Minister of the Interior who held sway on the fate of his crew, but also German Lieutenant Commander Hermann Lorey in Constantinople, who would later become a Rear Admiral.

=== Post-war ===
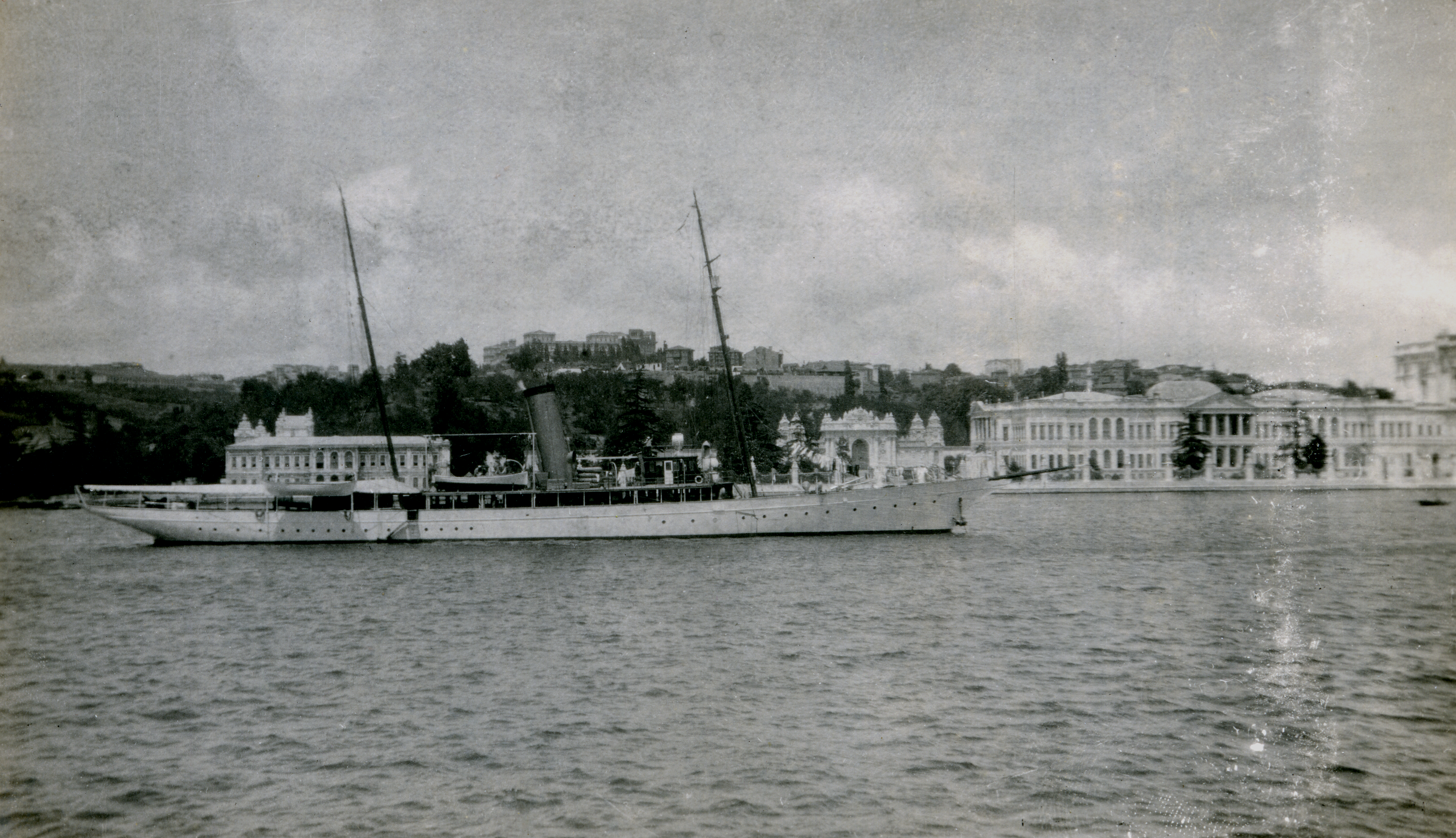
USS Scorpion visiting Constantinople in the Ottoman Empire on 7 July 1920.

With the arrival at Constantinople of Rear Admiral Mark L. Bristol, U.S. High Commissioner to the Ottoman Empire and Senior U.S. Naval Officer in Turkish Waters, Scorpion assumed duties as flagship and dispatch vessel, continuing, at the same time, her station ship and relief work. Redesignated PY-3 in 1920 when the U.S. Navy instituted its alphanumeric hull classification system, she shifted to Phaleron Bay, Greece, in November 1923 and took up duties as station ship in the eastern Mediterranean. In late 1926, Commander Moses B. Byington took command. On 16 June 1927, she departed the Mediterranean under Commander Byington and steamed west to return to the U.S. On 11 July 1927, she arrived at Philadelphia.

== Final decommissioning and disposal ==
Scorpion was decommissioned at Philadelphia on 27 October 1927, as part of Navy Day observances, with Rear Admiral Thomas P. Magruder, commandant of the Navy Yard, in charge of the ceremonial. Captain H. A. Jones was her last commanding officer. She was struck from the Navy List on 23 March 1929. Following this, she was sold to the Boston Iron and Metal Company of Baltimore, Maryland on 25 June 1929.
