= USS Osceola (AT-47) =

Tugboat of the United States Navy

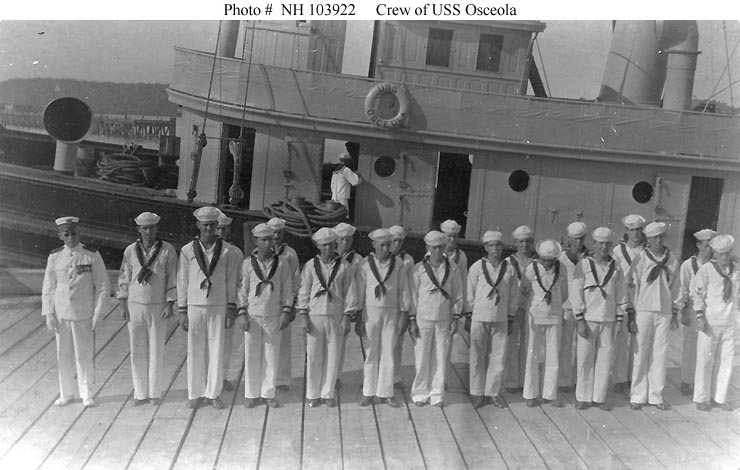
- USS Osceola and crew

History

United States
- Name: USS Osceola
- Namesake: Osceola (1804–1838), a noted Seminole chief and leader during the Second Seminole War (1835–1842)
- Builder: Charles Hillman, Philadelphia, Pennsylvania
- Laid down: 1896
- Completed: 1897
- Acquired: 21 March 1898
- Commissioned: 4 April 1898
- Recommissioned: 1 July 1911
- Stricken: 15 November 1922
- Fate: Sold 24 March 1923
- Notes: Served as commercial tug Winthrop 1897–1898

General characteristics
- Type: Armed tug
- Displacement: 571 long tons (580 t)
- Length: 138 ft (42 m)
- Beam: 26 ft (7.9 m)
- Draft: 14 ft 6 in (4.42 m)
- Speed: 14 kn (16 mph; 26 km/h)
- Armament: 2 × 3-pounders, 1 × machine gun

The second USS Osceola, later AT-47, was a United States Navy armed tug in commission in 1898 and in combat in the Spanish–American War, and from 1911 to 1922.

Osceola was laid down as the commercial tug Winthrop by Charles Hillman, Philadelphia, Pennsylvania in 1896. Completed in 1897, Winthrop was purchased by the U.S. Navy from Staples Coal Company on 21 March 1898 and commissioned on 4 April 1898, as the United States made final preparations for the approaching war with Spain.

Osceola saw immediate action after commissioning as the United States became involved in the Spanish–American War. She joined the force at Key West, Florida in May 1898, in preparation for duty in the blockade of Cuba.

In the attack on Cabañas, Cuba, Osceola prepared for towing disabled ships, up to a dozen at a time. In July 1898 she joined armed yacht Scorpion in a reconnaissance of Manzanillo, Cuba. On 18 July 1898, Osceola and Scorpion joined in the major attack on Manzanillo, an attack causing severe losses to the Spaniards. In August Osceola joined the strong force that captured the port. The armistice that brought the war to a close soon followed, on 13 August 1898. Decommissioned after the war, Osceola was laid up.

Osceola recommissioned on 1 July 1911. On 16 March 1912, she would tow the hulk of the USS Maine, whose 1898 destruction precipitated the Spanish–American War, to its final resting place in international waters.

During World War I, she steamed to Guantánamo Bay in 1918 and remained there as station ship through 1920. In 1920, as part of the U.S. Navy's institution of an alphanumeric hull classification system, she was designated AT-47 as a seagoing tug.

In 1921 Osceola became part of a special U.S. Navy squadron organized to patrol Caribbean waters to promote friendly relations between the United States and Latin America. In 1922 she steamed to Port-au-Prince, Haiti, and returned to the United States that autumn.

Osceola decommissioned and was struck from the Naval Vessel Register on 15 November 1922. She was sold to F. E. Pope of Washington, D.C., on 24 March 1923.
