= Sunwing =

Sunwing may refer to:

- Sunwing Airlines
- Sunwing Vacations Group
- Sunwing (novel)

== See also ==
- Sun: Wings, an album by Japanese singer-songwriter Miyuki Nakajima
- Sunwin, a Chinese bus manufacturer
