= USS Wompatuck =

Tugboat of the United States Navy

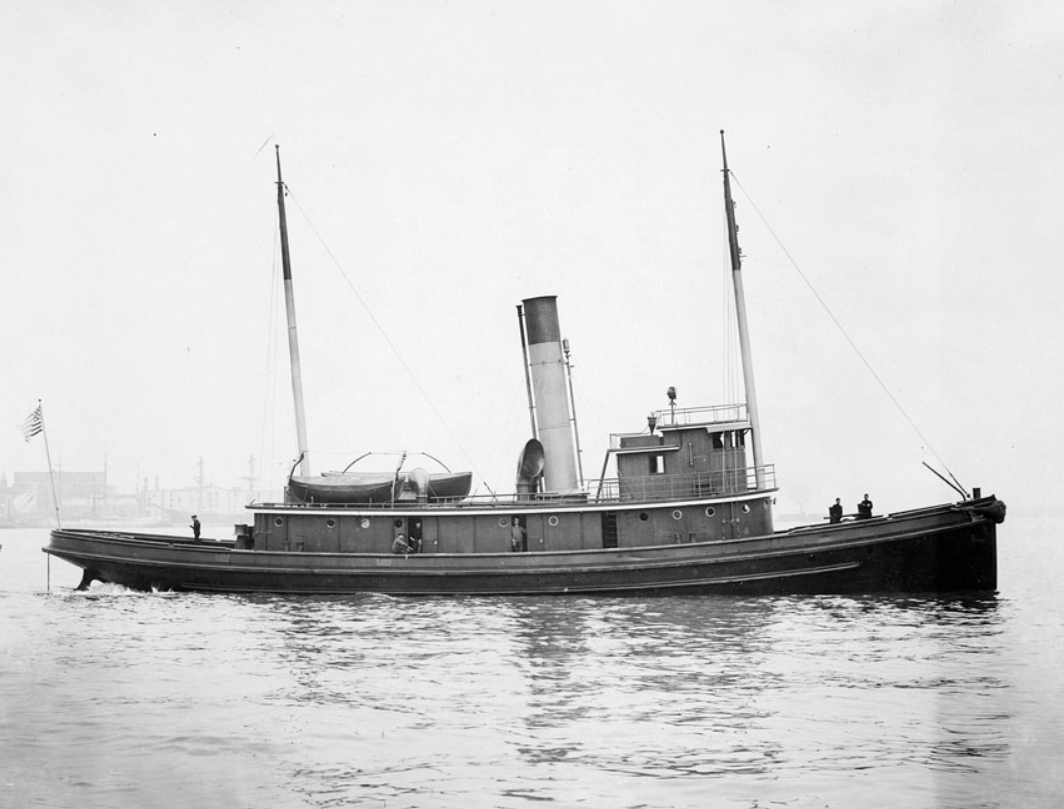
- USS Wompatuck underway on 21 April 1899.

History

United States
- Name: Atlas
- Operator: Standard Oil Company of New York
- Builder: Harlan and Hollingsworth, Wilmington, Delaware
- Completed: 1896
- Fate: Sold to U.S. Navy 4 April 1898

History

United States Navy
- Name: USS Wompatuck
- Namesake: Wompatuck (ca. 1627–1669), Massachusett leader
- Acquired: 4 April 1898
- Commissioned: 6 April 1898
- Decommissioned: 15 October 1898
- Recommissioned: 12 November 1900
- Reclassified: District Harbor Tug (YT-27), 17 July 1920
- Decommissioned: 31 July 1931
- Stricken: 11 February 1938
- Fate: Laid up awaiting sale 1938–1941; Withdrawn from sale list 9 July 1941
- Renamed: YO-64 9 October 1941
- Reclassified: Fuel Oil Barge (YO-64) 9 October 1941
- Fate: Lost ca. late December 1941
- Stricken: 21 April 1944

General characteristics
- Type: Armed tug
- Displacement: 323 long tons (328 t)
- Length: 130 ft (39.6 m) (overall); 106 ft (32.3 m) (between perpendiculars)
- Beam: 25 ft 6 in (7.8 m)
- Draft: 12 ft (3.7 m) (mean)
- Propulsion: Steam engine, one shaft
- Complement: 28
- Armament: 2 × 6-pounder guns; 1 × 3-pounder gun

USS Wompatuck (YT-27) was an armed tug in commission in the United States Navy from 1898 to 1931. Early in her naval career, she saw combat in the Spanish–American War and the Philippine–American War. After she was decommissioned, she was selected for conversion into the fuel oil barge YO-64, but she was lost in the early days of World War II in the Pacific before the conversion could be completed.

== Construction, acquisition, and commissioning ==
Wompatuck was completed in 1896 as the iron-hulled commercial screw tug Atlas for the Standard Oil Company of New York by Harlan and Hollingsworth at Wilmington, Delaware. Amid deteriorating relations with Spain in the spring of 1898, the U.S. Navy acquired Atlas from Standard Oil of New York on 4 April 1898. After refitting her for naval service at the New York Navy Yard in Brooklyn, New York, the Navy commissioned her there as USS Wompatuck on 6 April 1898.

== Service history ==
=== Spanish–American War ===
Assigned to the North Atlantic Squadron, Wompatuck departed New York City on 16 April 1898 and proceeded via Norfolk, Virginia; Port Royal, South Carolina; and Key West, Florida, to the Caribbean. During her journey, the Spanish–American War began on 25 April 1898, when the United States Congress declared war on Spain retroactive to 21 April. She arrived off Havana, Cuba, on 30 April 1898, bearing dispatches and mail for the ships of the North Atlantic Squadron blockading Cuba.

==== Operations off southeast Cuba ====
On 12 May 1898, Captain Charles P. Goodrich, the commanding officer of the auxiliary cruiser USS St. Louis, embarked in Wompatuck with United States Marine Corps Lieutenant A. W. Catlin, eight U.S. Marines, and 11 volunteer U.S. Navy sailors. Wompatuck then headed for the mouth of the harbor at Santiago de Cuba on Cuba's southeast coast to attempt to cut the undersea telegraph cable linking Cuba with Jamaica. Unluckily for the Americans, a Spanish patrol craft sighted them; and Goodrich ordered a hasty retirement, "not knowing what might be the resources of the defense in guns and search lights."

At daybreak on 18 May 1898, St. Louis and Wompatuck slowly closed the Santiago de Cuba harbor entrance in a second attempt to locate and destroy the cable. The St. Louis′s grapnel soon snagged on the telegraph cable; but, almost simultaneously, Spanish coastal artillery batteries opened fire on the two American warships. Although neither Wompatuck nor St. Louis was well-suited for a slugging match with coast defense batteries, both stayed on station until they had cut communications between Jamaica and Cuba. In his subsequent action report, Captain Goodrich lauded Lieutenant Jungen's "praise-worthy display of coolness and pluck in battle."

On 19 May 1898, St. Louis and Wompatuck attempted to cut Spanish cable connections at Guantánamo Bay on Cuba's southeast coast′. Wompatuck proceeded into the harbor and dragged her hook along the bottom while St. Louis lay-to outside, her main battery at the ready. Spanish shore batteries soon opened fire and eventually drove the American ships out to sea.

After a brief period of repairs at Key West, Wompatuck returned to the blockade. She later took part in the landings of United States Army troops at Daiquirí on Cuba's southeast coast to relieve pressure on U.S. Marines entrenched at Guantánamo Bay.

During the Daiquirí operation, Wompatuck screened U.S. Army transports on the voyage to the landing zone on 22 June 1898 and later towed 18 launches, whaleboats, and cutters towards the shore to help land the troops from the transports. After she had pointed the first landing parties toward the beaches, she shelled Spanish defense positions to prevent the Spanish defenders from launching a counterattack against the American force ashore.

==== First Battle of Manzanillo ====
On 30 June 1898, Wompatuck joined the gunboats USS Hist and USS Hornet in reconnoitering the port of Manzanillo, Cuba. They encountered the Spanish 30-displacement ton gunboat Centinela near Niguero Bay; Wompatuck′s draft was too great for her to pursue Centinela as she retreated into shallow water near the coast, but Hist and Hornet followed her and, after they exchanged fire with Centinela and with Spanish troops on shore, Centinela′s crew beached her.

The three American ships then proceeded to Manzanillo itself, where they found numerous merchant ships and six Spanish warships, the gunboats Cuba Española, Delgado Parejo, Estrella, Guantánamo, and Guardián and the sailing vessel Maria; Cuba Española, Guardián, and Maria were functioning as immobile armed pontoons. Second in column, Wompatuck followed Hist′s lead and opened fire on the Spanish ships as soon as she reached firing range. The Spanish ships responded with an intense fusillade of their own. Wompatuck′s forward 3-pounder fired only seven rounds before the stress sheared off rivets at the base of the mount, rendering it useless, forcing Jungen to order her helm to be put over to starboard, causing Wompatuck to maneuver out of column formation but allowing her to bring her after battery to bear. Jungen reported that this permitted his vessel to maintain a "brisk...and well-directed" fire.

A Spanish shell, meanwhile struck Hornet and severed a steam line. Escaping steam scalded three men, and at least one of whom died. Wompatuck, seeing Hornet in distress, stopped, backed down, and passed Hornet a tow line which Wompatuck′s crew had laid out with foresight earlier that afternoon as she had cleared for action. After her first attempt to pull Hornet out of danger failed, Wompatuck came alongside to make certain that the towing hawser was securely fastened. Meanwhile, the Spanish had noticed that Hornet was disabled. The two-ship "nest" provided too good a target to pass up, and the Spaniards concentrated their gunfire on Wompatuck and Hornet. A "hot and uncomfortable" fire from cannon, mortars, and small arms soon fell around the two American warships. Wompatuck took three minor-caliber shell hits, one of which holed her port whaleboat and passed 4 feet (1.2 m) from Lieutenant Jungen. As the two American vessels crept out of danger, a sloop full of Spanish soldiers approached them from their disengaged side, hoping that the Americans were too busy to notice them. However, Hornet′s gunners sighted them and got off a well-placed 6-pounder shell which they reported sank the sloop. During the ensuing 55-minute duel, no ships – except possibly the sloop – were lost on either side, but the American ships claimed to have sunk a Spanish "torpedo boat."

After undergoing repairs, Wompatuck assisted Hist and Hornet in breaking Spanish undersea cables between Media Luna and Quizaro Island on 11 July 1898.

==== Third Battle of Manzanillo ====
One week later, on the morning of 18 July 1898, Wompatuck formed part of an American squadron that conducted a bold and devastating three-pronged raid on Manzanillo. The American warships, which also included Hist, Hornet, the gunboats USS Helena and USS Wilmington, the armed tug USS Osceola, and the armed yacht USS Scorpion and were under the overall command of the commanding officer of Wilmington, Captain Chapman C. Todd, approached the enemy from three directions through various shipping channels, with Helena and Wilmington attacking from the left by entering via a channel on the northern side of Manzanillo Bay, Osceola and Scorpion attacking via a central channel directly opposite the city, and Hist, Hornet, and Wompatuck approaching from the right through one of the southern entrance channels to the bay. The three groups timed their passages so that would enter the bay simultaneously.

The American squadron caught the Spanish by surprise, but at 07:04 Spanish coastal artillery batteries opened fire on the American ships. At about 07:19, Osceola and Scorpion commenced counterbattery fire against the Spanish coastal artillery. While Helena and Wilmington opened fire on the merchant steamers Gloria and Jose Garcia and the blockade runner Purísima Concepción, several of the Spanish gunboats in the harbor – Cuba Española, Delgado Parejo, Estrella, Guantánamo, and Guardián – steamed out to offer battle to the American ships but retreated to their moorings under heavy fire.

Although forced to advance cautiously in the shallow waters of Manzanillo Bay to keep from running aground, Hist, Hornet, and Wompatuck pursued the gunboats and engaged them at their moorings. Deciding that his ships were focusing too much of their attention on the merchant ships in the harbor and the hulk Maria, Todd ordered Helena to shift her fire from them to the gunboats, leaving it to Wilmington to finish off the merchant steamers. Helena systematically engaged the Spanish gunboats. Under fire by Helena, Hist, Hornet, and Wompatuck, three of these caught fire and exploded, one was beached and sank, and the fifth ran aground; the Americans assessed her as disabled, and her crew later removed her armor and scuttled her. With the entire Spanish flotilla at Manzanillo destroyed or disabled, Todd ordered the American ships to withdraw at 10:22 while Helena lay down suppressing fire, and the battle was over at 10:35. The Americans emerged unscathed, but Wompatuck′s 3-pounder again had been put out of action when the rivets holding the base of its mount to the ship failed under the stress of firing.

Following the Third Battle of Manzanillo, Wompatuck underwent repairs at Key West before returning to the waters off Cuba. The Spanish–American War came to an end on 13 August 1898.

=== Later career ===
Wompatuck departed Guantánamo Bay on 14 August 1898, convoying the torpedo boat USS Rodgers to Key West before proceeding north with the torpedo boat USS Morris in tow and arriving at New York City on 26 August 1898. After repairs, Wompatuck proceeded on to Boston, Massachusetts, which she visited from 2 to 9 September 1898. After towing the monitor USS Wyandotte to Philadelphia, Pennsylvania, for decommissioning, Wompatuck returned to New York City on 15 September 1898 and was decommissioned at the New York Navy Yard on 15 October 1898.

Recommissioned at the New York Navy Yard on 12 November 1900, Wompatuck departed New York City on 10 December 1900 and rendezvoused in Hampton Roads, Virginia, with the gunboat USS Annapolis, the patrol yacht USS Frolic, and the tug USS Piscataqua. Underway for East Asia on 30 December 1900, the ships proceeded via the Mediterranean, the Suez Canal, Colombo, and Singapore to the Philippines, arriving at Cavite on Luzon on 24 April 1901.

Based at Cavite, Wompatuck spent the next few years participating in American military operations in the Philippine–American War, performing a wide variety of duties. She cooperated with U.S. Army units at Lubang, Tilig, and Luk Bay in the spring of 1901 and subsequently provisioned lighthouses at Kapones Island, Subig, and Olongapo; transported men and mail; and assisted vessels in distress. She carried out regular transportation services between Cavite and Olongapo into the spring of 1903 and later steamed to China to take part in the United States Asiatic Fleet's summer target practices at Chefoo.

Assigned to the naval station at Cavite in 1904 and designated a "district harbor tug" with the hull classification symbol YT-27 on 17 July 1920, when the Navy adopted its modern, alphanumeric system of hull designations, Wompatuck performed harbor tug service until decommissioned on 31 July 1931. Her name was struck from the Navy list on 11 February 1938.

Wompatuck apparently was laid up at Cavite for more than three years, awaiting disposal. However, she was withdrawn from the sale list on 9 July 1941 and selected for conversion into a self-propelled, diesel oil barge. She was reclassified as a "fuel oil barge" (YO) and renamed YO-64 on 9 October 1941, but her conversion apparently was incomplete when the Philippines fell to the Japanese in the early months of World War II in the Pacific. While no records have been found delineating her fate after war broke out in East Asia, it can be assumed that she was either captured by the Japanese when they took Cavite on 2 January 1942 or was scuttled by American or Filipino forces to prevent her capture. YO-64 was struck from the Navy list on 21 April 1944.
