= Thespia =

Thespia may refer to:

- alternative spelling of Thespiae, an ancient city and former bishopric in Boeotia (Greece), also as Latin Catholic titular see
- Thespia (mythology), a daughter of river gods
- a synonym for Colotis, a genus of butterflies
- Thespia, former name of USS Hist (1895), a US Navy ship which saw combat in the Spanish–American War
