= Vacation Express =

Tour operator based in Atlanta, GA

- Type: Private
- Industry: Tour operator
- Founded: 1989 in Atlanta, Georgia
- Founders: Kevin Hernandez; Gantt Cookson; Meg Deeb
- Headquarters: Atlanta, Georgia, United States
- Key people: Rene Jongmans, president; Gantt Cookson, vice president of operations, co-founder; Kevin Hernandez, vice president of sales and marketing, co-founder
- Parent: Sunwing Travel Group
- Website: www.vacationexpress.com

Vacation Express is a tour operator based in Atlanta, Georgia. The company was founded in 1989. Vacation Express was purchased by Sunwing Travel Group in 2011 for an undisclosed sum. The company has sold over two million vacation packages.

== History ==
Vacation Express was founded in 1989 by Kevin Hernandez, Gantt Cookson and Meg Deeb. The company's initial offering was air/land vacation packages to Jamaica. In 1992, the company began a charter flight from Atlanta to Cancun and eventually became known as a charter operator in the Southeast and Midwest. By 1998, Vacation Express sold packages from nine U.S. cities to Cancun, Cozumel, Aruba and Costa Rica. That year, Vacation Express was purchased for $24 million by the subsidiary of Airtours International Airways, North America Leisure Group. As part of the acquisition the Vacation Express began offering cruises, expanded its services into the Mid-Atlantic region and listed Baltimore as a chartered gateway. After ten years in business, the company had grown to sell travel packages to 100,000 customers annually by 1999. In 2003, Vacation Express was purchased by Flightserv Inc., a travel services division of eResource Capital Group, along with another tour operator for $16.5 million.

In 2011, Sunwing Travel Group purchased Vacation Express for an undisclosed sum. As a result of the sale Sunwing Airlines, a subsidiary of Sunwing Travel Group, sells fares through Vacation Express. The company also sells charters flights through many airlines including Aeroméxico, Interjet, and iAero Airways.
