= MZO =

MZO may refer to:

- Sierra Maestra Airport which uses the IATA airport code MZO
- Ministry of Science and Education (Croatia) which uses acronym MZO in Croatian for Ministarstvo znanosti i obrazovanja
