= Moon: Wings =

Studio album by Miyuki Nakajima
- Released: November 3, 1999
- Studio: Ocean Way (Hollywood); A&M (Los Angeles); Cello (Hollywood); Epicurus (Tokyo)
- Genre: Folk rock
- Length: 50:03
- Label: Pony Canyon/AARD-VARK, Yamaha Music Communications
- Producer: Ichizo Seo, Miyuki Nakajima

Miyuki Nakajima chronology
Be Like My Child (Watashi no Kodomo ni Narinasai) (1998)	Moon: Wings (1999)	Short Stories (Tanpenshū) (2000)

Moon: Wings (月-WINGS, Tsuki -Uingusu) is the 27th studio album by the Japanese singer-songwriter Miyuki Nakajima.

In November 1999, it was simultaneously released with another album Sun: Wings which has a similar concept. Both albums contain the songs written for the series of Yakai, which had been her conventional plays performed each December from 1989 to 1998.

Moon is Nakajima's least successful studio album in terms of sales, entering the Japanese charts for less than one month. It became the final album released by her long-term label Pony Canyon, because she moved to the newly founded semi-independent record label Yamaha Music Communications in the following year.

== Track listing ==
All songs written and composed by Miyuki Nakajima, arranged by Ichizo Seo (except "Pain" arranged by David Campbell).

1. "Jasmine (1人で生まれて来たのだから, Hitori de Umarete Kita no Dakara)" – 5:05
2. "A Scarlet River (紅い河, Akai Kawa)" – 6:22
3. "Last Scene" – 6:25
4. "Sweet Poison (女という商売, On-na to Iu Shoubai)" – 4:16
5. "Smile, Smile" – 5:23
6. "Pain" – 8:04
7. "White Chrysanthemum (白菊, Shiragiku)" – 4:54
8. "Statute of Limitation (時効, Jikou)" – 4:16
9. "Far Away from Love (愛から遠く離れて, Ai kara Tōku Hanarete)" – 5:18

== Personnel ==
- Kenny Aronoff – drums
- Russ Kunkel – drums, cymbals
- Hideo Yamaki – cymbals
- M.B. Gordy – percussion
- Lee Sklar – bass
- Bob Glaub – bass
- Neil Stubenhaus – bass
- Reggie Hamilton – bass
- Chiharu Mikuzuki – bass
- Oscar Meza – bass
- David Stone – bass
- Michael Thompson – electric guitar
- Chuei Yoshikawa – auto-harp
- Yasuharu Nakanishi – keyboards
- Elton Nagata – keyboards
- Ichizo Seo – keyboards
- Jon Gilutin – keyboards, acoustic piano, electric piano, synthesizer, Hammond organ, panpipe
- Shingo Kobayashi – keyboards, programming
- Keishi Urata – programming, drum-loop, percussion loop, sound effect
- Seiichi Takubo – programming, drum-loop, percussion loop, sound effect
- Manabu Ogasawara – programming, drum-loop
- Yosuke Sugimoto – programming
- Walter Fowler – trumpet
- Brandon Fields – tenor saxophone
- Stephen Kupka – baritone saxophone
- Chris Bleth – oboe, English horn
- Sheridon Stokes – flute
- Geraldine Rotella – flute
- Robert Becker – viola
- Matt Funes – viola
- Scott Haupert – viola
- Denyse Buffum – viola
- Matthew Funes – viola
- Renia Koven – viola
- David Stenske – viola
- Karie Prescott – viola
- Larry Corbett – cello
- Stefanie Fife – cello
- Daniel Smith – cello
- Rudolph Stein – cello
- Steve Richards – cello
- Sid Page – violin (concertmaster)
- Joel Derouin – violin (concertmaster)
- Eve Butler – violin
- Berj Garabedian – violin
- Armen Garabedian – violin
- Shari Zippert – violin
- Gerrardo Hilera – violin
- Mario De Leon – violin
- Erza Kliger – violin
- Susan Charman – violin
- John Wittenberg – violin
- Murray Adler – violin
- Michele Richards – violin
- Edmund Stein – violin
- Robert Peterson – violin
- Peter Kent – violin
- Clayton Haslop – violin
- Gary Kuo – violin
- Ruth Bruegger – violin
- Barbra Porter – violin
- Virginia Frazier – violin
- David Campbell – strings conducting
- Suzie Katayama – strings conducting
- Julia Waters – backing vocals
- Maxine Waters – backing vocals
- Oren Waters – backing vocals
- Peggi Blu – backing vocals

== Release history ==
Country	Date	Label	Format	Catalog number
Japan	November 3, 1999	Pony Canyon	CD	PCCA-01380
Japan	November 3, 1999	Pony Canyon	APO-CD	PCCA-01381
Japan	November 21, 2001	Yamaha Music Communications	CD	YCCW-00032
Japan	November 5, 2008	Yamaha Music Communications	CD	YCCW-10079

== Chart positions ==
Year	Chart	Position	Sales
1999	Japanese Oricon Weekly Albums Chart (Top 100)	19 (CDDA)	46,000+
1999	Japanese Oricon Weekly Albums Chart (Top 100)	27 (APO-CD)	46,000+
