= Flight 1526 =

Flight 1526 may refer to:

- Execuflight Flight 1526, a British Aerospace BAe-125-700A that crashed on 10 November 2015 during approach in Ohio, United States, killing all nine people on board
- Thomson Airways Flight 1526, a Boeing 737-800 that crashed on 21 July 2017 into runway lights during take-off with 185 people aboard
