= USS Piscataqua (AT-49) =

Tugboat of the United States Navy

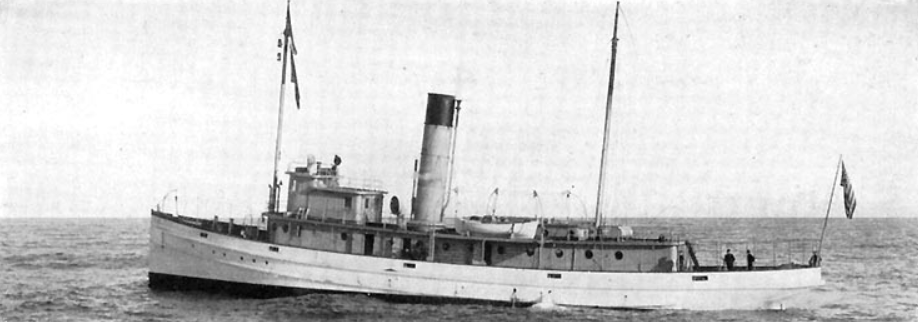
- USS Piscataqua underway in 1899.

History

United States
- Name: W. H. Brown
- Operator: W. H. Brown & Company
- Builder: F. W. Wheeler Company, West Bay City, Michigan
- Completed: 1897
- Fate: Sold to U.S. Navy 11 May 1898
- Notes: Commercial tug

History

United States Navy
- Name: USS Piscataqua
- Namesake: The Piscataqua River in New England
- Acquired: 11 May 1898
- Commissioned: 18 June 1898
- Reclassified: From "Fleet Tug No. 49" to AT-49, 17 July 1920
- Decommissioned: 10 April 1922
- Stricken: 4 August 1930
- Fate: Sold 7 January 1931; Converted to commercial barge

General characteristics
- Type: Armed tug
- Displacement: 854 long tons (868 t)
- Length: 149 ft (45.4 m)
- Beam: 28 ft 7 in (8.7 m)
- Draft: 12 ft (3.7 m)
- Propulsion: Steam engine
- Speed: 16 knots
- Complement: 58
- Armament: 2 × 3-pounder guns

USS Piscataqua (Fleet Tug No. 49), later USS Piscataqua (AT-49), the third United States Navy ship of the name, was an armed tug in commission from 1898 to 1922. Early in her naval career, she saw service in the Spanish–American War, and she operated in the Philippines during and after the Philippine–American War.

== Construction, acquisition, and commissioning ==
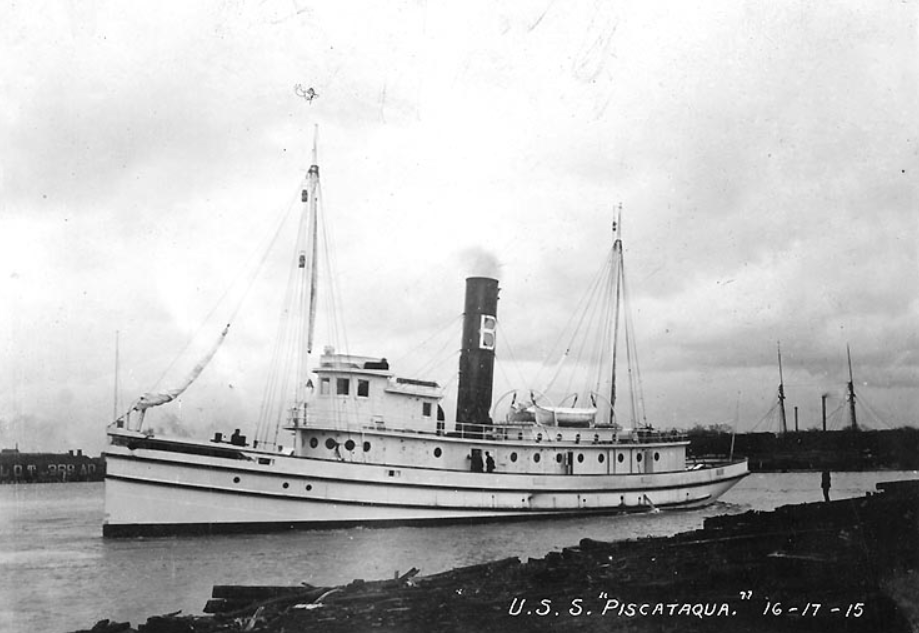
W. H. Brown in 1897 or 1898, prior to her acquisition by the United States Navy.

Piscataqua was completed in 1897 for W. H. Brown & Company as the commercial screw tug W. H. Brown by the F. W. Wheeler Company at West Bay City, Michigan. After the Spanish–American War broke out in April 1898, the U.S. Navy acquired her on 11 May 1898. She was commissioned as USS Piscataqua (Fleet Tug No. 49) on 18 June 1898.

== Service history ==
Piscataqua served in the waters off Cuba during the Spanish–American War, which ended in August 1898. After a refit at Norfolk Navy Yard in Portsmouth, Virginia, from 12 to 27 December 1900, she rendezvoused in Hampton Roads, Virginia, with the gunboat USS Annapolis, the patrol yacht USS Frolic, and the armed tug USS Wompatuck. The ships got underway for East Asia on 30 December 1900. The ships proceeded via the Mediterranean, the Suez Canal, Colombo, and Singapore to the Philippines, arriving at Cavite on Luzon in the Philippines on 24 April 1901. Piscataqua spent the rest of her career in the Asiatic Squadron and its successor, the United States Asiatic Fleet, and was designated a "fleet tug" with the hull classification symbol AT-49 on 17 July 1920, when the Navy adopted its modern, alphanumeric system of hull designations

Piscataqua was decommissioned at Cavite Navy Yard in the Philippines on 10 April 1922. Struck from the Navy List on 4 August 1930, she was sold for scrapping on 7 January 1931 in Manila to Rograciano Rodriquez, but was converted into a commercial barge instead of being scrapped.
