= James Meredith Helm =

American military officer (1855–1927)

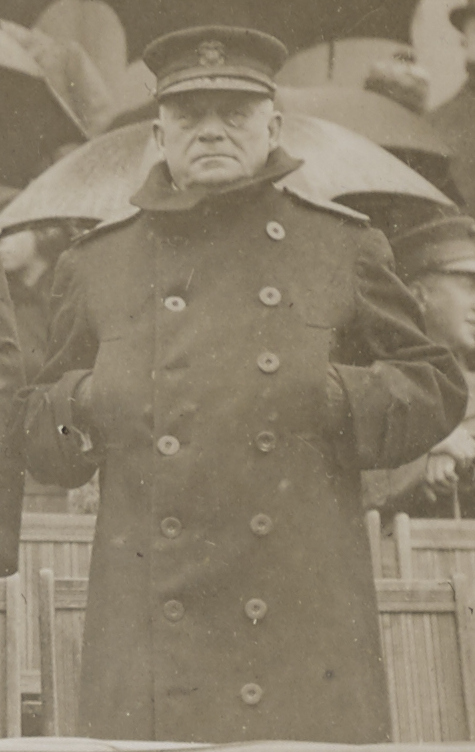
- Helm in 1919
- Born: December 16, 1855; Grayville, Illinois, U.S.
- Died: October 28, 1927 (aged 71); Takoma Park, Maryland, U.S.
- Burial place: Arlington National Cemetery
- Spouse: Elizabeth Benham (m. 1920)
- Military career
- Allegiance: United States of America
- Branch: United States Navy
- Service years: 1875–1919
- Rank: Rear Admiral
- Commands: USS Hornet; USS Idaho; USS Wabash
- Conflicts: Spanish–American War; First Battle of Manzanillo; World War I
- Awards: Navy Cross

James Meredith Helm (December 16, 1855 – October 28, 1927) was a rear admiral in the United States Navy during the Spanish–American War.

== Early life and education ==
James Meredith Helm was born on December 16, 1855, in Grayville, Illinois. He graduated from the United States Naval Academy in 1875.

== Career ==
Helm served on various ships and abroad until the Spanish–American War. He then commanded the gunboat Hornet. In the blockade of Cuba, he captured a Spanish steamer and three contraband schooners. He was advanced five numbers in grade for outstanding performance at the Battle of Manzanillo on June 30, 1898. Helm subsequently commanded the Idaho and Wabash.

During World War I, Helm was Commandant of the 4th Naval District and received the Navy Cross for his achievements. He retired on December 16, 1919.

== Personal life ==
Helm married Edith Benham, daughter of Admiral Andrew E. K. Benham, on April 20, 1920. She worked as social secretary in Woodrow Wilson's White House, and accompanied the President to the Paris Peace Conference.

Helm died following two heart attacks on October 28, 1927, in Takoma Park, Maryland. He was buried in Arlington National Cemetery.

== Legacy ==
The destroyer USS Helm (DD-388) commissioned in 1937 was named for him.
