= Battle of Manzanillo =

Battle of Manzanillo may refer to:

- First Battle of Manzanillo, naval engagements during the Spanish–American War on June 30, 1898, in and near the harbor of Manzanillo, Cuba involving three American gunboats
- Second Battle of Manzanillo, a naval engagement of the Spanish–American War on July 1, 1898, involving two different American gunboats
- Third Battle of Manzanillo, a large and decisive naval engagement of the Spanish–American War on July 18, 1898
