= Armistead Rust =

United States Navy officer

- Born: July 12, 1862; Campbell County, Virginia
- Died: December 29, 1941 (aged 79); Naval Hospital, Annapolis, Maryland
- Military career
- Allegiance: United States of America
- Branch: United States Navy
- Service years: 1887–1912, 1917–1919
- Rank: Captain
- Conflicts: Spanish–American War; World War I

Armistead Rust (12 July 1862 – 29 December 1941) was an officer of the United States Navy.

== Biography ==
Armistead Rust was born in Campbell County, Virginia, on 12 July 1862. He was appointed a cadet engineer at the United States Naval Academy on 1 October 1881. After completing the course of instruction, he was detached from the Naval Academy on 1 June 1885 to await orders for the two years of sea duty that preceded graduation at that time. Following service in Tennessee and Richmond, he returned to Annapolis in the spring of 1887 for graduation, received his diploma on 15 June 1887, and was commissioned an ensign on 1 July 1887.

During the next three years, Rust served successively in the Bureau of Navigation and the sloops of war Saratoga, Constellation, and Jamestown. In December 1890, he began an assignment ashore. Following four months of ordnance duty at the Washington Navy Yard, he reported to the Naval Proving Ground at Indian Head, Maryland, on 7 April 1892 for similar service. In September 1892, Rust went home for a year's leave of absence. Upon his return to active service at the end of August 1893, Ens. Rust went to sea in Pinta. Following duty in connection with the recommissioning of the armored cruiser Boston in September and October 1895 and a brief assignment to Ranger from late October to early December, he was transferred to Monterey and served in her until September 1896 when he went home on three months of leave. At the end of November 1896, Ens. Rust commenced another ordnance assignment at Indian Head.

Newly promoted Lt. (jg.) Rust was detached from the Proving Ground on 11 November 1897 and reported on board the gunboat Newport a week later. During the Spanish–American War, he served successively in Newport, Hist, and Princeton. On 10 June 1899, Rust was promoted to lieutenant while still serving in Princeton. Between January 1900 and March 1901, Lt. Rust served in Don Juan de Austria and Scindia. After a tour of duty ashore at Bath, Maine, as inspector of equipment and ordnance, he returned to sea in Montgomery in July 1902 and served in her until September 1904. Following an assignment to Minneapolis between November 1904 and January 1906, Lt.Comdr. Rust moved ashore once again as a gunnery instructor at the Washington Navy Yard.

In November 1907, he reported to the Bureau of Equipment in Washington in conjunction with preparations for a hydrographic survey of the southern coast of Cuba between Cape Cruz and Casilda. Lt.Comdr. Rust directed that mission during the first five months of 1908 and reported back to Washington in June. Late in October, he returned to Cuba to resume direction of the hydrographic survey and to assume command of Hist. He was promoted to commander on 4 November 1908. Comdr. Rust completed his tour of hydrographic duty in October 1910 and went to Louisiana (Battleship No. 19). He was detached from that warship in August 1911 and soon began two months of temporary duty at the Bureau of Ordnance. On 26 October 1911, Comdr. Rust assumed command of USS Baltimore (Cruiser No. 3) with additional duty as captain of the yard at the Charleston Navy Yard.

On 2 July 1912, he was placed on the retired list in the rank of captain, to date from 30 June 1912. Capt. Rust was called back to active duty on 4 April 1917, two days before the United States entered World War I. For the remainder of 1917 and the first five months of 1918, he served as an inspector of ordnance—first at Philadelphia, Pennsylvania and, later, at Hagerstown, Maryland. Early in June 1918, he was transferred back to Philadelphia where he served on the staff of the Commandant, 4th Naval District, chairing boards investigating maritime mishaps. Capt. Rust resumed his retirement on 23 July 1919 and took office as the superintendent of the Massachusetts Nautical Academy. He served in that post until 29 April 1932 when he moved to Annapolis. Capt. Rust died on 29 December 1941 at the Naval Hospital, Annapolis, Maryland Capt. Rust, an expert on navigation, wrote several books on the subject.

== Namesake ==
In 1945, the submarine chaser PCS-1404 was reclassified as a surveying ship, and named USS Armistead Rust (AGS-9) in honor of Capt. Rust.
