= 2021 Sunwing Airlines party incident =

Passenger flight safety controversy

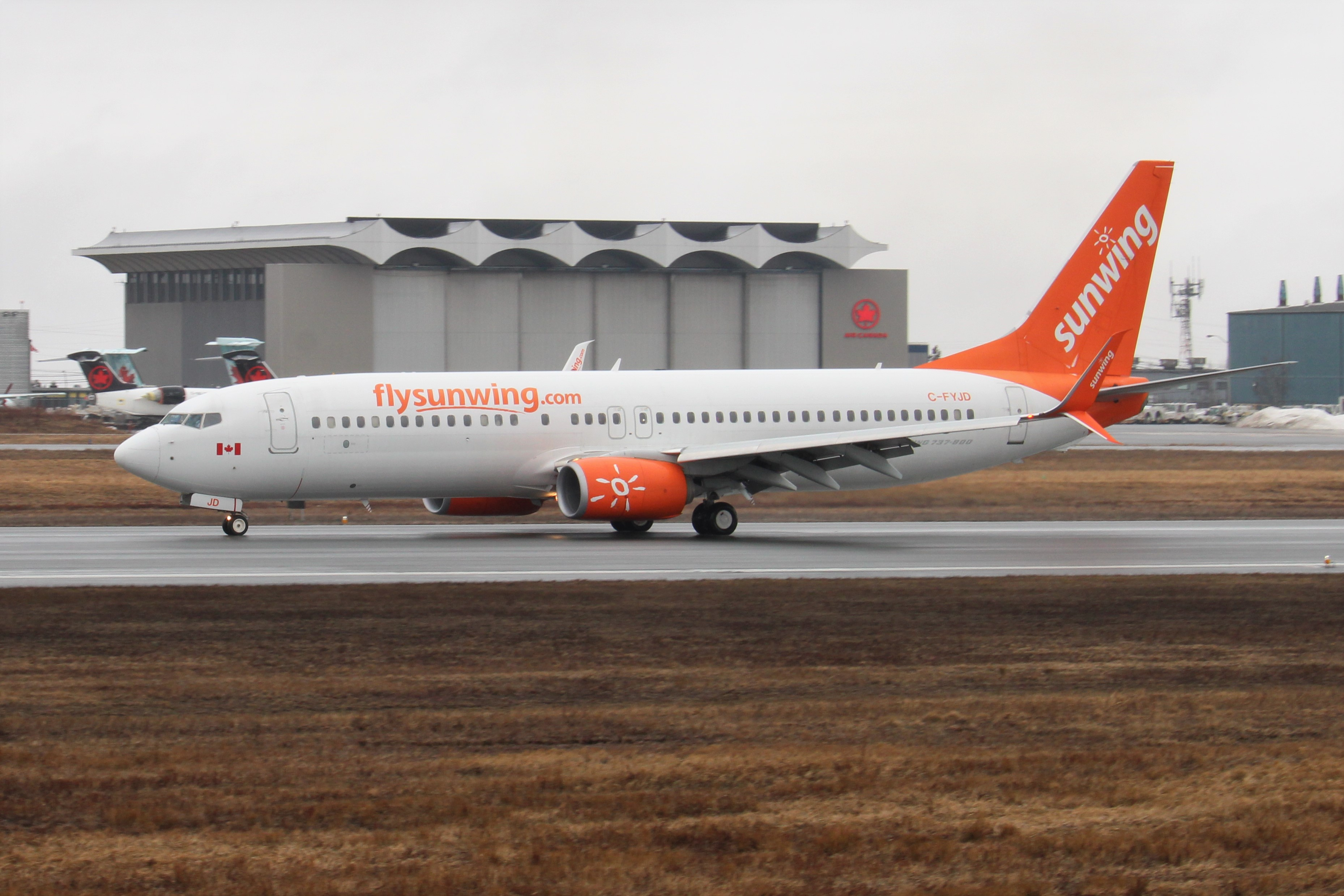
- C-FYJD, the aircraft involved, pictured in March 2021

Occurrence
- Date: December 30, 2021

Aircraft
- Aircraft type: Boeing 737-800
- Operator: Sunwing Airlines
- Call sign: WG2283 / SWG2283
- Registration: C-FYJD
- Flight origin: Montréal-Dorval International Airport
- Destination: Cancún International Airport
- Passengers: 130

On December 30, 2021, Sunwing Airlines operated a charter flight from Montréal–Dorval International Airport to Cancún International Airport. During the flight, some passengers were unruly and may have violated Transport Canada and public health regulations which caused controversy. The flight was carrying a group consisting of mainly Quebec-based influencers and reality television stars. The behavior of passengers was criticized by numerous officials, including Prime Minister Justin Trudeau. On January 4, 2022, the Ministers of Transportation, Health, and Public Safety announced a joint investigation of the flight with passengers facing fines of up to $5,000 per offence.

== Background and flight ==
The incident occurred during the COVID-19 pandemic in Canada where the Government of Canada introduced mask and vaccination requirements on aircraft. Further with the Omicron variant of concern increasing cases in Canada, the government advised against non-essential travel.

The flight was chartered by a private Montreal club for a 6-day excursion. The aircraft involved was at the time a 6-year old Boeing 737-800, registration C-FYJD carrying 130 people and was operated by Sunwing Airlines, a low-cost carrier specializing in flights to Mexico, the Caribbean, Europe, and within Canada. Prior to boarding, 40 passengers were refused entry because they were not adequately vaccinated. During the flight, some passengers became unruly. They blocked aisles, removed their masks, smoked electronic cigarettes, and consumed alcohol. This violated public health and transport safety regulations posing a danger to the flight. In particular, the vaping was criticized as it could have deployed the onboard fire alarms. Several passengers tested positive for COVID-19. During the flight the situation deteriorated so much that flight attendants "had to hide at the back of the plane".

== Reactions ==
Sunwing Airlines said that regulations were violated and that it was conducting an internal investigation. At a press conference the Prime Minister of Canada Justin Trudeau called the influencers "idiots", "barbarians", and said their behavior was a "slap in the face" to airline workers and people following health restrictions. Canadian Minister of Health Jean-Yves Duclos said that an investigation was underway and that some passengers returning had been subjected to additional testing at the border. The Canadian Ministers of Transport, Health, and Public Safety have instructed their departments to investigate the flight. Additionally, the Sûreté du Québec is investigating the situation, contacting the Public Health Agency of Canada for details on the passengers. As of January 12, 2022 12 notices of infractions of the federal Quarantine Act have been given to passengers and numerous passengers have tested positive for COVID-19. After the incident Air Canada, Air Transat, and Sunwing Airlines cancelled the return flights of passengers on the original flight. When commenting on the situation the President of the Canadian Union of Public Employees airline division called for more health measures to protect airline crew, including more availability for booster shots, reduced in-flight service, and more rapid tests. Further, members of parliament called for the government to retrieve pandemic support given to Sunwing Airlines.
