= Sunwing Airlines =

Ultra low-cost airline of Canada (2005–2025)

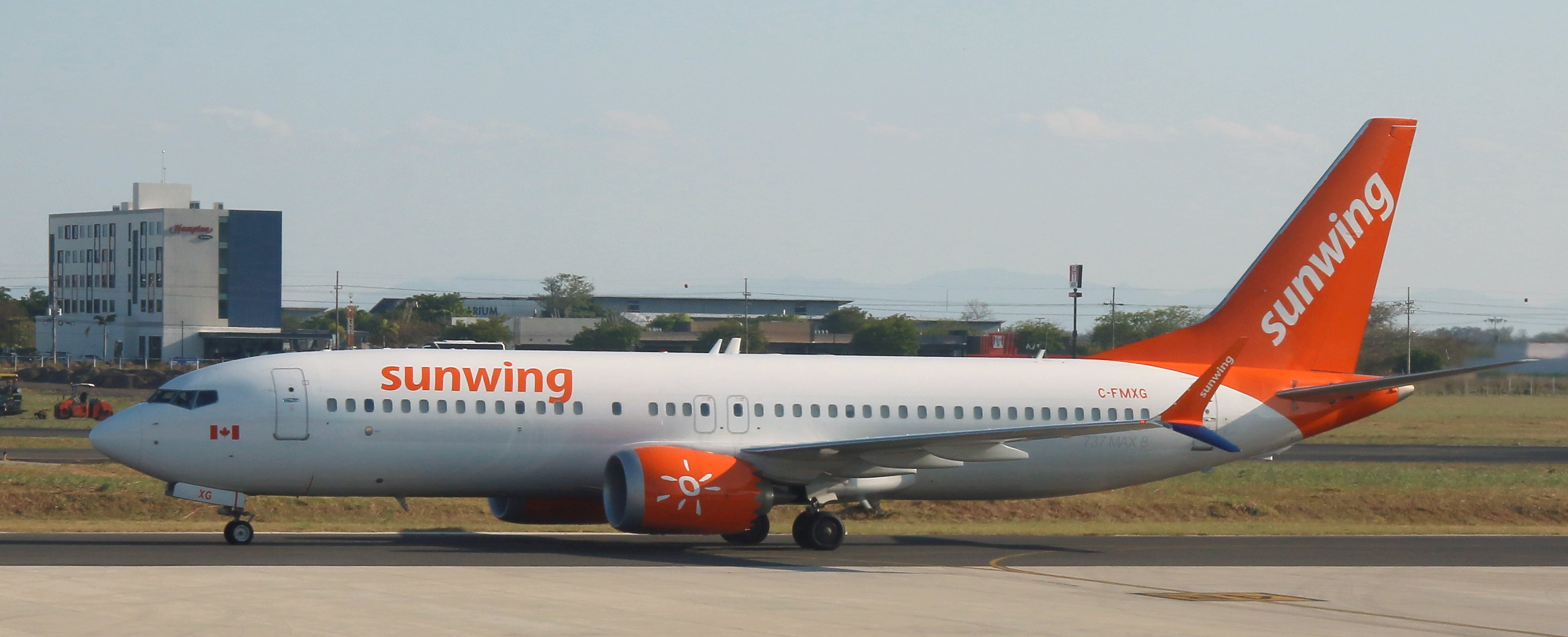
- Sunwing Boeing 737 MAX 8
IATA	ICAO	Call sign
WG	SWG	SUNWING
- Founded: November 17, 2005
- Commenced operations: November 17, 2005
- Ceased operations: May 28, 2025
- AOC #: Canada: 15022, United States: U6WF143F
- Operating bases: Calgary; Montréal–Trudeau; Ottawa; Toronto–Pearson; Vancouver
- Fleet size: 9
- Destinations: 54
- Parent company: Sunwing Travel Group (2005–2023); WestJet (2023–2025)
- Headquarters: Toronto, Ontario, Canada
- Key people: Len Corrado (president)
- Employees: 1,500 (2015)
- Website: www.sunwing.ca

Sunwing Airlines Inc was a Canadian low-cost airline headquartered in Toronto, Ontario with its main bases at Montréal–Trudeau International Airport and Toronto Pearson International Airport. Originally owned by Sunwing Travel Group, from 2023 onwards it was a subsidiary of WestJet, with which it merged on May 28, 2025.

== History ==
=== Foundation and early years ===
By 2004, Sunwing Vacations had become the second largest tour operator in Ontario. That year, a former Skyservice employee named Mark Williams approached the CEO of Sunwing Travel Group, Colin Hunter, and asked if he wanted to start an airline.

In November 2005, a Boeing 737-800 departing from Toronto to Santiago de Cuba was the airline's inaugural flight. In December 2005, Sunwing flew its first direct flight from Sudbury, Ontario to Varadero, Cuba, making it one of the first international flights directly from the Sudbury Airport.

In November 2006, the company flew its first flight out of Montreal. By 2008, Sunwing had grown to operate in 29 cities.

=== Development since 2010 ===
In June, 2012, an unnamed individual and Transat A.T. submitted information to the Canadian Transportation Agency that was believed to challenge Sunwing's ability to operate an airline on the grounds of foreign ownership. In November 2012, the CTA announced that Sunwing operated within foreign ownership limits.

In 2015, it was announced that Sunwing had finalized a $350 million deal to acquire two Boeing 737-800 and four Boeing 737 MAX 8 aircraft from Air Lease Corporation. The aircraft were due to be delivered over a four-year period from early 2016. Seneca College and the University of Waterloo launched a partnership with Sunwing in 2016 to form a cadet program which includes flight training and mentoring through Sunwing.

Sunwing joined the Transportation Security Administration's (TSA) expedited screening program, TSA PreCheck, in January 2017. At that time, the TSA PreCheck program was available at 180 United States airports and works with 30 airlines.

Sunwing received its first Boeing 737 MAX, a 737 MAX 8, on May 25, 2018.

As of 2023, Sunwings offered buy on board service, after previously providing free meals on longer flights.

In March 2023, Canadian Minister of Transport Omar Alghabra approved the takeover of Sunwing and Sunwing Vacations by WestJet with the acquisition completed in May 2023. On June 17, 2023, WestJet announced that they would merge Sunwing with the mainline business - the transition could take up to two years. In May 2024, WestJet announced it would fully incorporate Sunwing's operations in 2025. Sunwing operated its last flight on May 28, 2025, flight WG9078, a return from lease of a Boeing 737 OK-TVV of Smartwings (with Sunwing registered as C-GKVV) from Toronto Pearson International Airport to Václav Havel Airport Prague.

== Destinations ==
Sunwing offered scheduled and charter services from Canada and the United States to destinations within the United States, Mexico, the Caribbean, Central America, and South America in the winter months. The most popular destinations included Varadero, Punta Cana, Cancún, and Montego Bay. Its former parent company, the Sunwing Travel Group, is Cuba's largest travel provider internationally, sending over 700,000 vacationers to the destination each year.

In Canada, the airline operated several domestic routes, including a daily Toronto to Vancouver flight, as well as maintaining year-round service to its most popular destinations. Other connections included Deer Lake, Gander, and St John's from Toronto. As of summer 2015, the airline operated service to Caribbean destinations from Atlanta, Baltimore, Charlotte, Cincinnati, Columbus, Houston, Lansing, Milwaukee, Nashville, New Orleans, Newark, Philadelphia, Pittsburgh, and Rockford.

During the summer months, the company offered domestic services across Canada. The company also operates seasonal flight services from 23 local Canadian gateways, such as CFB Bagotville, Calgary International Airport, Deer Lake Regional Airport, Edmonton International Airport, Fredericton International Airport, Gander International Airport, Halifax Stanfield International Airport, John C. Munro Hamilton International Airport, Kelowna International Airport, Region of Waterloo International Airport, London International Airport, Greater Moncton Roméo LeBlanc International Airport, Ottawa Macdonald–Cartier International Airport, Québec City Jean Lesage International Airport, Regina International Airport, Saskatoon John G. Diefenbaker International Airport, St. John's International Airport, Thunder Bay International Airport, Vancouver International Airport, Windsor International Airport, and Winnipeg James Armstrong Richardson International Airport.

Sunwing flew to the following destinations at the time of its merger with WestJet:

Country	Region	City	Airport	Notes	Refs
Antigua and Barbuda	Saint John	St. John's	V. C. Bird International Airport		
Aruba	Oranjestad West / Oranjestad East	Oranjestad	Queen Beatrix International Airport		
Bahamas	Grand Bahama	Freeport	Grand Bahama International Airport		
Canada	Alberta	Calgary	Calgary International Airport	Seasonal base	
Canada	Alberta	Edmonton	Edmonton International Airport	Seasonal base	
Canada	British Columbia	Kelowna	Kelowna International Airport	Seasonal base	
Canada	British Columbia	Vancouver	Vancouver International Airport	Seasonal base	
Canada	Manitoba	Winnipeg	Winnipeg James Armstrong Richardson International Airport	Seasonal base	
Canada	New Brunswick	Fredericton	Fredericton International Airport	Seasonal base	
Canada	New Brunswick	Moncton	Greater Moncton Roméo LeBlanc International Airport	Seasonal base	
Canada	Newfoundland and Labrador	Deer Lake	Deer Lake Regional Airport	Seasonal base	
Canada	Newfoundland and Labrador	Gander	Gander International Airport	Seasonal base	
Canada	Newfoundland and Labrador	St. John's	St. John's International Airport	Seasonal base	
Canada	Nova Scotia	Halifax	Halifax Stanfield International Airport	Seasonal base	
Canada	Ontario	Hamilton	John C. Munro Hamilton International Airport	Seasonal base	
Canada	Ontario	Kitchener	Region of Waterloo International Airport	Seasonal base	
Canada	Ontario	London	London International Airport	Seasonal base	
Canada	Ontario	Ottawa	Ottawa Macdonald–Cartier International Airport	Seasonal base	
Canada	Ontario	Thunder Bay	Thunder Bay International Airport	Seasonal base	
Canada	Ontario	Toronto	Toronto Pearson International Airport	Base	
Canada	Ontario	Windsor	Windsor International Airport	Seasonal base	
Canada	Quebec	Bagotville	CFB Bagotville	Seasonal base	
Canada	Quebec	Montreal	Montréal–Trudeau International Airport	Base	
Canada	Quebec	Quebec City	Québec City Jean Lesage International Airport	Seasonal base	
Canada	Saskatchewan	Regina	Regina International Airport	Seasonal base	
Canada	Saskatchewan	Saskatoon	Saskatoon John G. Diefenbaker International Airport	Seasonal base	
Colombia	San Andrés, Providencia and Santa Catalina	San Andrés Island	Gustavo Rojas Pinilla International Airport		
Costa Rica	Guanacaste	Liberia	Guanacaste Airport		
Cuba	Ciego de Ávila Province	Cayo Coco	Jardines del Rey Airport		
Cuba	Isla de la Juventud	Cayo Largo	Vilo Acuña Airport		
Cuba	Villa Clara Province	Cayo Santa Maria	Abel Santamaría Airport		
Cuba	Cienfuegos Province	Cienfuegos	Jaime González Airport		
Cuba	Holguín Province	Holguín	Frank País Airport		
Cuba	Granma Province	Manzanillo	Sierra Maestra Airport		
Cuba	Matanzas Province	Varadero	Juan Gualberto Gómez Airport		
Dominican Republic	La Romana Province	La Romana	La Romana International Airport		
Dominican Republic	Puerto Plata Province	Puerto Plata	Gregorio Luperón International Airport		
Dominican Republic	La Altagracia Province	Punta Cana	Punta Cana International Airport		
Grenada	Saint George Parish, Grenada	St. George's	Maurice Bishop International Airport		
Honduras	Bay Islands Department	Roatán	Juan Manuel Gálvez International Airport		
Jamaica	Cornwall County	Montego Bay	Sangster International Airport		
Mexico	Guerrero	Acapulco	Acapulco International Airport		
Mexico	Quintana Roo	Cancún	Cancún International Airport		
Mexico	Baja California Sur	Los Cabos	Los Cabos International Airport		
Mexico	Sinaloa	Mazatlán	Mazatlán International Airport		
Mexico	Jalisco	Puerto Vallarta	Licenciado Gustavo Díaz Ordaz International Airport		
Panama	Coclé Province	Río Hato	Scarlett Martínez International Airport		
Saint Lucia	Vieux Fort District	Vieux Fort	Hewanorra International Airport		
Sint Maarten	—	Sint Maarten	Princess Juliana International Airport		
United States	Florida	Orlando	Orlando International Airport		

== Fleet ==
=== Current fleet ===
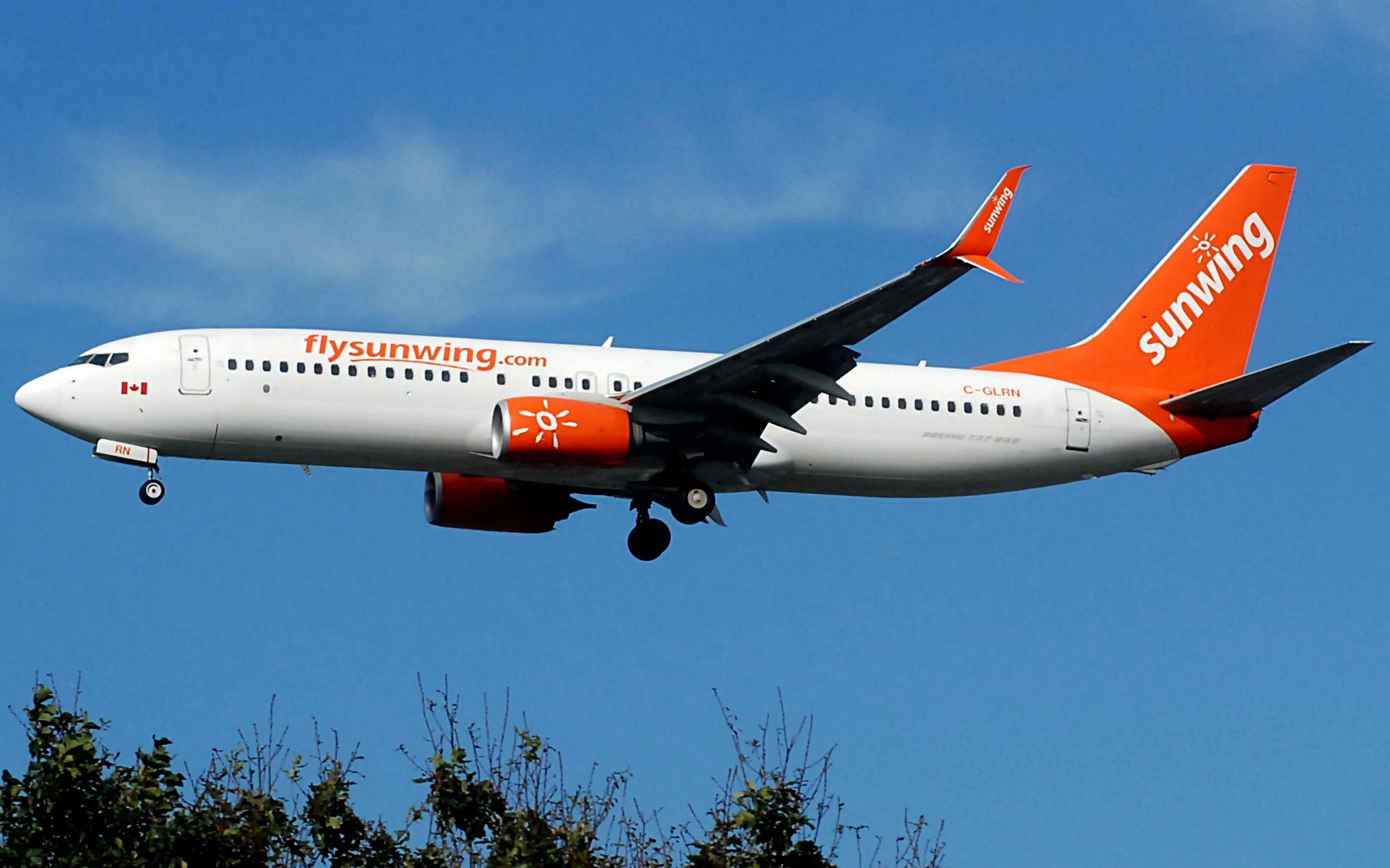
Sunwing Boeing 737-800

At the time of its merger with WestJet, Sunwing operated an all-Boeing 737 fleet composed of the following aircraft listed below. Although they have only 9 aircraft registered with Transport Canada, they state on their website that they have over 40.

Sunwing fleet
Aircraft	In service	Orders	Passengers	Notes
Boeing 737-800	5	—	189	
Boeing 737 MAX 8	4	—	189	
Total	9	—		

During the summer, Sunwing regularly sent several of their aircraft over to Europe to operate for the TUI Group and Smartwings during their extremely busy season. The aircraft operated flights all around Europe for the two companies. This was reciprocated during the winter months with TUI and Smartwings leasing out several aircraft to Canada to operate Sunwing routes.

=== Former fleet ===
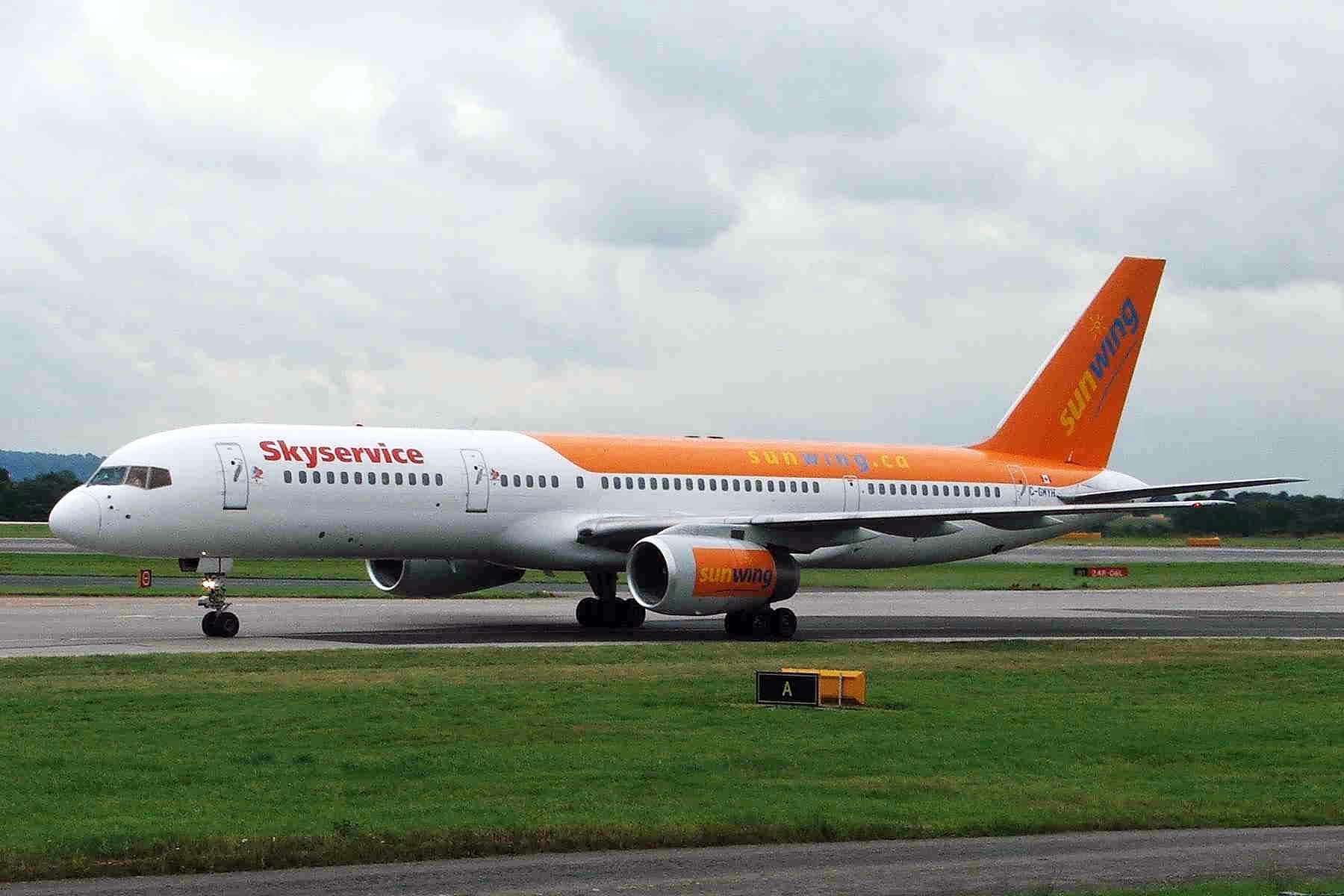
A former Boeing 757, the 200 series with Skyservice and Sunwing dual-livery on it, August 2005

Sunwing formerly also operated the following aircraft types:

Sunwing former fleet
Aircraft	Total	Introduced	Retired	Notes
Boeing 767-300ER	2	2012	2012	300ER series on seasonal lease from EuroAtlantic Airways.

== Accidents and incidents ==
- On July 25, 2014, a Sunwing Boeing 737-800, flight 772 from Toronto Pearson International Airport to Scarlett Martínez International Airport, was forced to return to Toronto after a passenger made a bomb threat. The plane was escorted by a United States Air Force plane and it landed safely. The passenger was arrested and was said to be mentally ill after being examined by medical personnel. The same flight was delayed again after a passenger fainted.
- On July 21 2017, Thomson Airways Flight 1526, a Boeing 737-800 operated by Sunwing Airlines, struck runway approach lights on departure from Belfast International Airport, due to an incorrect temperature input into the aircraft's flight computer, leading to an under-performance on takeoff. The aircraft continued to Corfu uneventfully, and the incident was only noticed when ground crew saw damage to the light fixtures. The incident led to several recommendations for new monitoring systems and equipment certifications.
- On January 5, 2018, a Sunwing Boeing 737-800 (registration C-FPRP), which was being taxied with no passengers, struck WestJet Flight 2425, a Boeing 737-800 (registration C-FDMB) flight from Cancún International Airport to Toronto Pearson International Airport, while parked and on approach to the gate. Fire crews put out a small fire on the Sunwing aircraft.
- In December 2016, a pilot was removed from the cockpit of a Sunwing flight and charged after it was determined that he was drunk. A police spokesman indicated that it was Sunwing staff that determined the pilot was impaired and implied that his license would be revoked.
- On December 30, 2021, a Sunwing Boeing 737-800 (registration C-FYJD) was operating Sunwing Flight 2283, a charter flight from Montréal–Trudeau International Airport to Cancún International Airport. On board the flight a group of influencers started to become unruly on board the flight and began to consume their own alcohol, use electronic cigarettes, with other passengers alleging that drugs were being consumed on the aircraft as well as non-compliance of orders from Transport Canada surrounding mask-wearing due to the COVID-19 pandemic in Canada. In the aftermath of this event, Sunwing canceled the charter flight back to Montreal with other Canadian airlines, Air Transat and flag carrier Air Canada stating that passengers who were on Flight 2283 would be denied boarding. Prime Minister of Canada Justin Trudeau said that Flight 2283 was, "a slap in the face to see people putting themselves, putting their fellow citizens, putting airline workers at risk by being completely irresponsible". Federal Minister of Transport, Omar Alghabra and Minister of Public Safety, Marco Mendicino released a joint statement and directing both of their respective departments to investigate the events of Flight 2283.
