= USS Hist =

Tender of the United States Navy

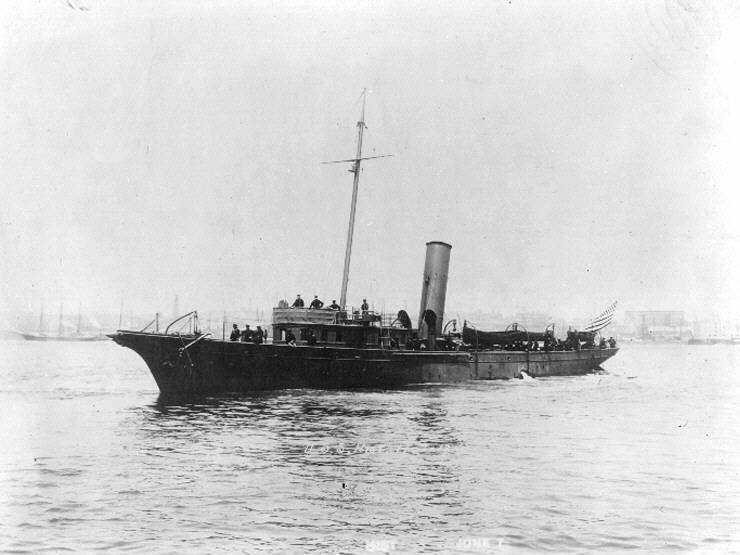

History

United States
- Laid down: 1895
- Acquired: 22 April 1898
- Commissioned: 13 May 1898
- Decommissioned: 24 July 1911
- Stricken: 27 July 1911
- Fate: Sold 20 November 1911

General characteristics
- Length: 174 ft (53 m)
- Beam: 23 ft (7.0 m)
- Draft: 9 ft 10 in (3.00 m)
- Propulsion: Steam
- Complement: 56
- Armament: 1 × 3 pounder, 4 × 1 pounder

USS Hist, formerly Thespia, was built in 1895. She was purchased at Norfolk from David Dows, Jr., on 22 April 1898 for use in the Spanish–American War. Hist commissioned 13 May at New York, Lt. Lucien Young in command.

== History ==
Arriving at Guantánamo Bay via Charleston 25 June, Hist joined the blockading fleet off Santiago de Cuba on the 29th. The following day was a memorable one. That morning, in company with Hornet, Hist captured the Spanish schooner Nickerson. Their prize in tow, the two ships were joined by Wompatuck and the column headed for Manzanillo Bay. On their way. they engaged a Spanish gunboat, which they sank, and were fired on by shore troops at Niguero. Reaching Manzanillo, the three American vessels engaged an enemy torpedo boat, four gunboats, four pontoons, a battery of field artillery, enemy troops firing from the shore, and a Spanish-held fort. When the smoke and fire lifted after an hour and 40 minutes of sharp fighting, Hornet had been disabled but towed to safety by Wompatuck, Hist had been hit 11 times; the Spanish had received the worst of the battle, losing a gunboat, a pontoon, and a sloop loaded with troops as well as suffering serious damage to the gun and torpedo boats. No American casualties resulted.

Hist returned to Manzanillo Bay twice more during the war, 15 July and 12 August. In the first of these return engagements, 10 Spanish ships were sent to the bottom and many others seriously damaged. For her part in this action Hist received commendation from General S. H. Rios, commanding the Cuban troops rebelling against Spanish rule. The second engagement at Manzanillo Bay was no less successful.

On 3 July Hist followed up her early success by joining the fleet in battle off Santiago as the Spanish attempted to break the blockade. Under constant enemy fire, Hist rescued 142 Spanish sailors from their disabled and burning ship, Viscaya. Eight days after this engagement, she and Wompatuck cut the important cable connecting Media Luna and Quizaro Islands. Hist also cut the cable between Punta Carapacho and Cayo Obispo on 21 July, the day after she had participated effectively in the bombardment of Santa Cruz del Sur. When not in combat, Hist patrolled the Cuban coast, searching ships, and also served as a dispatch boat between the blockading fleet at Santiago and Guantanamo.

With the end of the war Hist headed north, reaching Key West 22 January 1899 and decommissioning there two weeks later, 2 February 1899. While out of commission, Hist traveled up the coast to Newport, R.I., where she recommissioned 18 July 1902, Lt. Victor Blue commanding. Hist sailed to the Caribbean on 16 November 1902 and served there as a patrol and dispatch ship, returning to Newport 4 February 1903. On 4 March she was assigned duty with new submarines being tested in Long Island Sound. After this, on 27 June Hist was attached to the First Naval District as a tender, continuing to operate out of Newport. On 28 September 1905 she was assigned to the Training Station at Newport as tender to the famed frigate Constellation and remained on this duty until decommissioning 3 May 1907.

Hist recommissioned 16 October 1907 at Newport, Lt. C. E. Courtney commanding, and became tender to the 2d Submarine Division. On 6 October 1908, she was assigned to the Cape Cruz–Casilda surveying expedition under Comdr. Armistead Rust. Returning to the Caribbean once more, Hist served the expedition as a supply and dispatch vessel for almost 3 years. Putting in at Portsmouth, Virginia on 18 May 1911, she decommissioned there 24 July. Hist was stricken from the Navy Register on 27 July 1911 and sold 20 November of that year.
