= Takeoff Acceleration Monitoring System =

A Takeoff Acceleration Monitoring System automates the pilot monitoring of Distance to Go (DTG), "to sense, in a timely fashion the development of insufficient acceleration, which would extend the takeoff roll, perhaps precipitously".

Over the years, recommendations have been made to develop a Take Off Performance Management System. The NLR and NASA developed TOPMS prototypes. However, these systems were never operationally introduced.

EASA established two working groups (WGs) to address this issue. WG-88 focussed on the specification and standardization of On-Board Weight and Balance Systems (OBWBS), an ongoing effort for what is considered to be a feasible option. WG-94 focussed on standards and operational conditions for a TOPMS; it WG-94 was concluded early 2017, considering that TOPMS was not feasible, in particular due to limitations in technology and data availability.

A version suitable for detecting gross errors, which can be integrated in existing avionics, has been proposed by National Aerospace Laboratory (NLR), KLM, and Martinair.

A 2019 research paper explores the cause of a July 2017 serious incident, caused by erroneous data entry, where such system could have been useful. It "summarises a basic takeoff acceleration monitoring system and the effect this would have had on the July 2017 event".

== Related inventions ==
- Airplane takeoff and landing performance monitoring system
