= USS Hornet (1898) =

Gunboat of the United States Navy

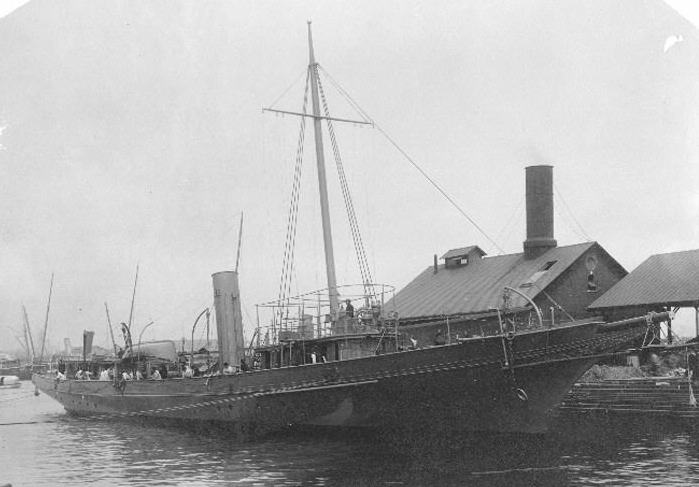
- USS Hornet at anchor.

History

United States
- Name: Hornet
- Laid down: 1890
- Acquired: 6 April 1898
- Commissioned: 12 April 1898
- Decommissioned: 18 October 1898
- Stricken: 18 March 1910
- Fate: Sold

General characteristics
- Type: Gunboat
- Displacement: 301 long tons (306 t)
- Length: 180 ft (55 m)
- Beam: 24 ft (7.3 m)
- Draft: 11 ft (3.4 m)
- Speed: 15 kn (17 mph; 28 km/h)
- Armament: 3 × 6-pounder (57 mm (2.24 in)) guns; 21-pounder guns

The sixth USS Hornet was a gunboat in the United States Navy. Hornet, the former yacht Alicia, was built by Harlan and Hollingsworth, Wilmington, Delaware, in 1890. It was purchased from Henry Morrison Flagler on 6 April 1898; and commissioned at New York 12 April 1898, with Lieutenant James Meredith Helm in command.

== Service history ==
Six days after she commissioned, Hornet sailed to join the American fleet blockading Spanish Cuba. Reaching Havana 24 April, she cruised in Cuban waters with several short trips to Key West. On 30 June 1898, Hornet was sent to reconnoiter cays and shoals off the Spanish fort at Manzanillo in company with Hist and Wompatuck. Early that morning, she seized the schooner Nickerson, of English registry but loaded with provisions and under a Spanish crew, trying to make her way into the blockaded harbor. At 08:15, the American ships spotted a Spanish gunboat anchored under the blockhouses of the Army, but closed for action anyway. Although under heavy and continuous fire from shore batteries and a small arms fusillade from Spanish troops, the American ships fired on and sank the gunboat, withdrawing with no casualties. That same day the three ships entered Manzanillo harbor and were soon deep in battle, with shells splashing in the water all around. Hornet's main steam pipe was cut by a Spanish shell and the ship filled with steam.

Although disabled, Hornet continued to fire on the enemy, her crew passing ammunition through the scalding steam as they drifted close in under the shore batteries. A small Spanish sloop came in from port, assuming that Hornet's attention was totally centered on her starboard batteries which were pounding the enemy. Hornet's alert crew shifted to port and with one well-placed shot from the six-pounder sent the sloop, rifles and all, to the bottom. By now Hornet had drifted dangerously close to shoal water. Wompatuck steamed over to tow her, all guns still blazing. Despite the day's heated action, not one sailor had been lost.

On 11 July, Hornet was back on station, joining Hist and Wompatuck to cut the cable near Santa Cruz del Sur, destroying telegraphic communication between Havana and Manzanillo. A week later she returned to Manzanillo as the American fleet entered the harbor. In 100 minutes of sharp action, Hornet and her sister ships sank nine Spanish ships as well as four armed pontoons, while under heavy fire from shore batteries and enemy troops lining the harbor.

Departing Key West on 10 August, Hornet reached Norfolk, Virginia two weeks later and decommissioned on 18 October. Loaned to the North Carolina Naval Militia, she served with them until 1902 and then reported to Norfolk as tender to the receiving ship Franklin. Hornet's name was struck 18 March 1910. She was sold 12 July 1910 to N. S. Sterns of New Orleans, Louisiana.

The ship was later bought in New Orleans, Louisiana by Sam Zemurray, where it was repurposed for use in a Honduran coup in 1910.

== Image gallery ==
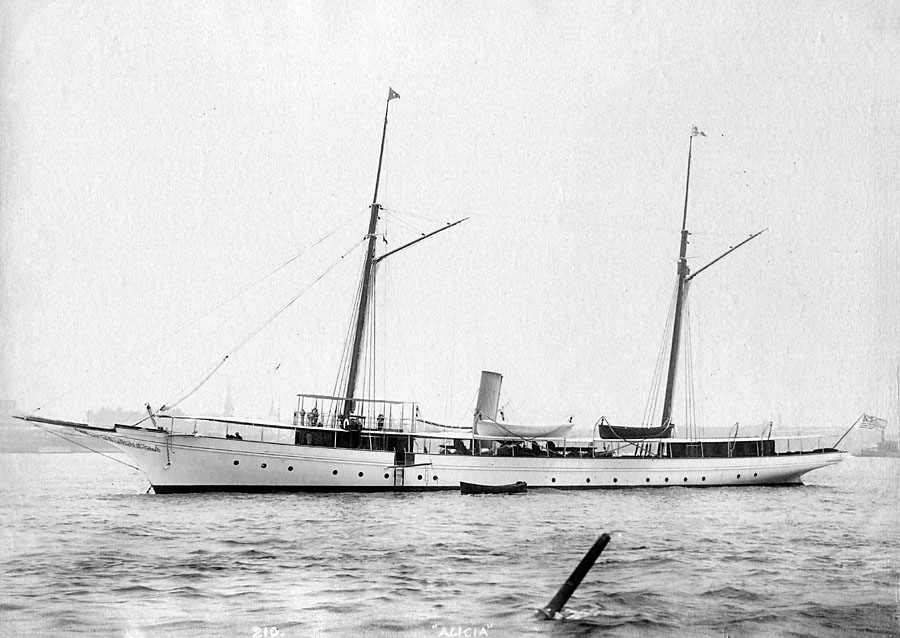
The yacht Alicia, later renamed the USS Hornet, as it appeared in 1895. Photograph by John S. Johnston.

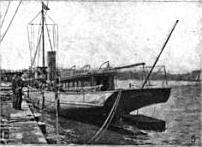
After she became the USS Hornet. View from Stern.
