= Rosa Porto =

Cuban-born American baker and businesswoman (1930–2019)

- Born: September 19, 1930; Manzanillo, Cuba
- Died: December 13, 2019 (aged 89); Los Angeles, California
- Occupations: Baker, businesswoman

Rosa Porto (September 19, 1930 – December 13, 2019) was a Cuban-American baker and businesswoman, founder of Porto's Bakery & Café chain of restaurants in Southern California.

== Early life ==
Porto was born in Manzanillo, Cuba. Her mother was born in Spain, and taught Porto to cook and bake. During the early years of the Cuban Revolution, her husband cut sugar cane in a labor camp, and Rosa baked for neighbors to support her family. Her baking business in Manzanillo was informal, and illegal. "Whenever the secret police would come to raid the house, we already knew they were coming and the neighbors would take the equipment we had to the backyard, so they never caught her," her daughter recounted in a 2017 interview.

== Career ==
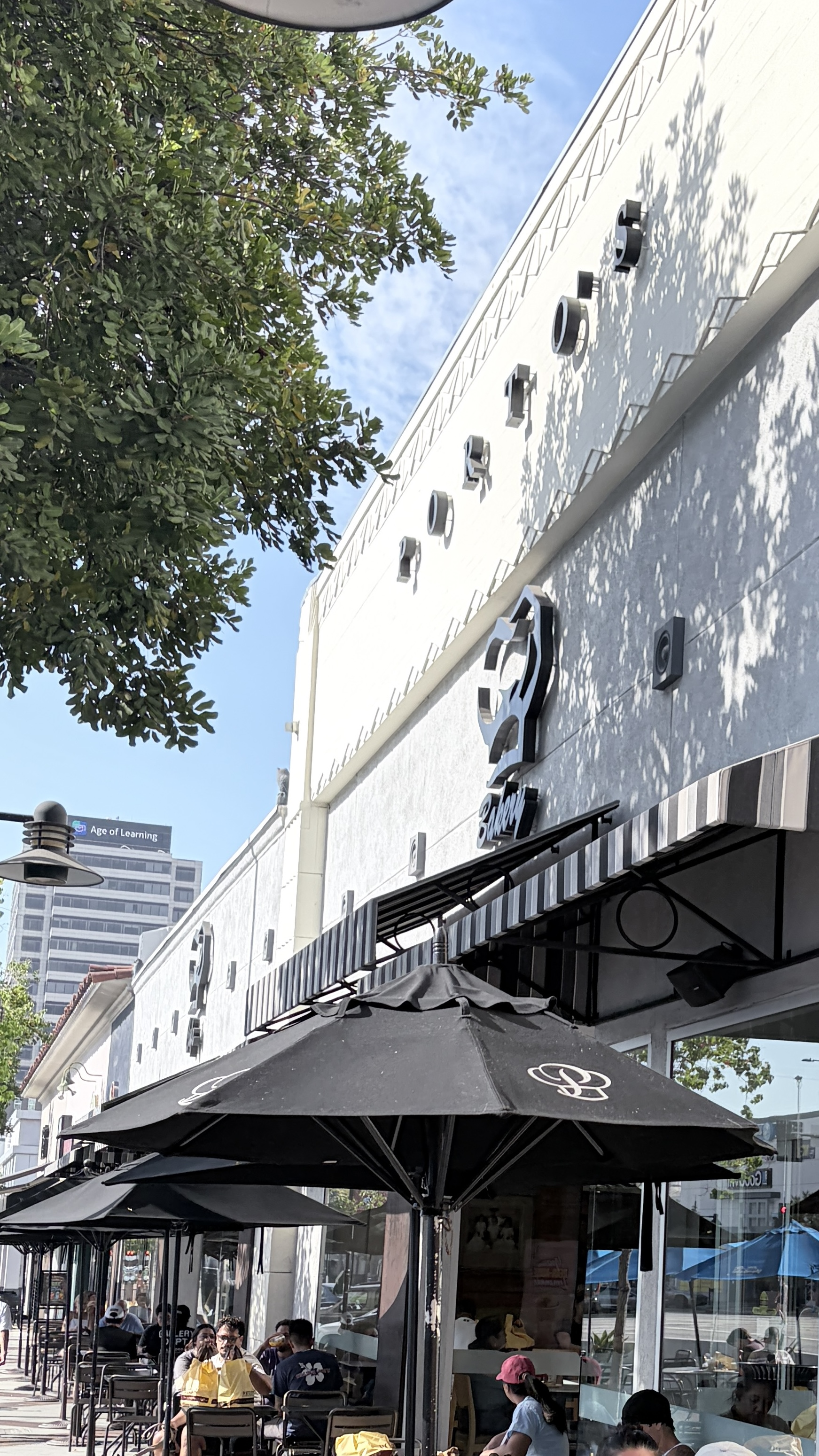
Porto's Glendale (2026)

The Portos were allowed to leave Cuba in 1971. They moved to Los Angeles, where she sold her Cuban-style cakes and other foods from home, while her husband worked as a janitor. The couple used a small loan to open a bakery in Silver Lake in 1976. Their next, larger location was in Glendale in 1982, and offered an expanded menu. Porto's Bakery & Cafe locations grew to include shops currently operating in Burbank, Downey, Buena Park, West Covina and Northridge, with a seventh site scheduled to open in 2025 at the Downtown Disney District at the Disneyland Resort in Anaheim. Porto's was especially popular with Cuban immigrants, but had a much wider clientele.

Rosa Porto retired from baking in the 1990s; her children and grandchildren continue to run the business, now with over a thousand employees. In 2019, Los Angeles Times referred to Porto's as "the most beloved bakery in all of Los Angeles." Following her death, U.S. Representative Lucille Roybal-Allard paid tribute to Rosa Porto in the House of Representatives, highlighting her entrepreneurial achievements and her legacy in Southern California.

== Personal life ==
Rosa and Raúl Porto married in Cuba in 1955. They had three children. Rosa Porto died in 2019, aged 89.
