= Grayville, Illinois =

Grayville
- City
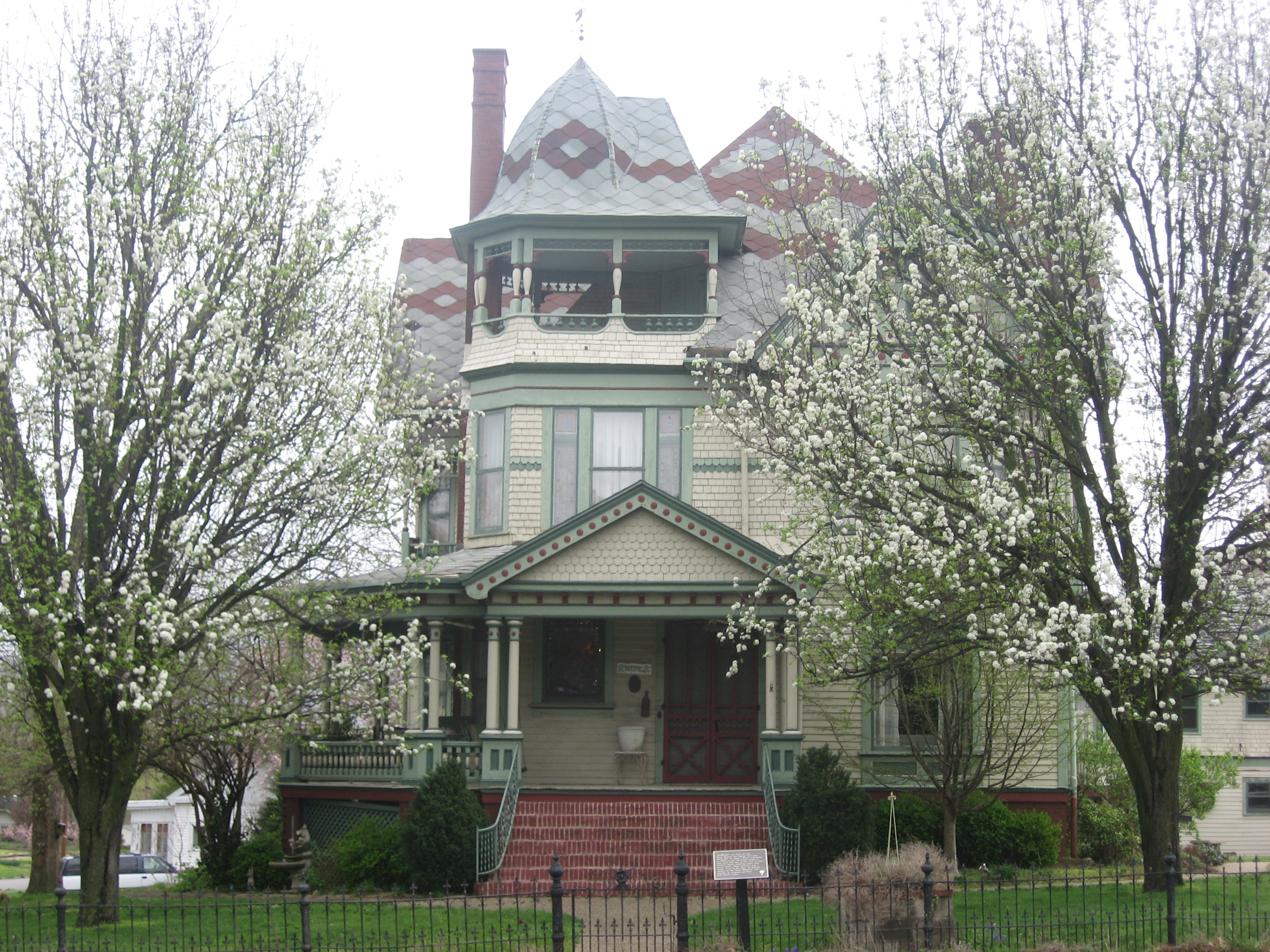
- The William W. Gray House, a local landmark

- Location of Grayville in Edwards County, Illinois.
- Coordinates: 38°15′00″N 87°59′45″W
- Country: United States
- State: Illinois
- County: Edwards, White

Area
  - Total: 2.17 sq mi (5.62 km^{2})
  - Land: 2.13 sq mi (5.51 km^{2})
  - Water: 0.042 sq mi (0.11 km^{2})
- Elevation: 423 ft (129 m)

Population (2020)
  - Total: 1,550
  - Density: 728.7/sq mi (281.34/km^{2})
- Time zone: UTC-6 (CST)
  - Summer (DST): UTC-5 (CDT)
- ZIP code: 62844
- Area code: 618
- FIPS code: 17-31165
- GNIS ID: 2394970
- Website: https://grayville-il.gov/

Grayville is a city in Edwards and White counties in the U.S. state of Illinois. As of the 2020 census, the city's population was 1,550, down from 1,666 at the 2010 census. Grayville is the birthplace of naval hero James Meredith Helm.

== History ==
Grayville was founded in about 1810 by the head of the Gray family, James Gray. The city became popular for its oil. Many people came to drill for oil. In the 1950s the population began to drop. Unlike other Illinois oil towns, Grayville still tends to thrive.

== Geography ==
According to the 2021 census gazetteer files, Grayville has a total area of 2.17 square miles (5.62 km^{2}), of which 2.13 square miles (5.52 km^{2}) (or 98.02%) is land and 0.04 square miles (0.10 km^{2}) (or 1.98%) is water.

=== Climate ===
Precipitation ranges from 82 mm (3.2 in) to 146 mm (5.7 in). Snowfall reaches its peak in December with 12 cm (4.7 in).

Climate data for Grayville, Illinois (1991–2020)
Month	Jan	Feb	Mar	Apr	May	Jun	Jul	Aug	Sep	Oct	Nov	Dec	Year
Mean daily maximum °F (°C)	41.2 (5.1)	45.0 (7.2)	55.7 (13.2)	67.6 (19.8)	77.5 (25.3)	85.7 (29.8)	88.6 (31.4)	87.6 (30.9)	82.2 (27.9)	70.1 (21.2)	56.3 (13.5)	44.8 (7.1)	66.9 (19.4)
Daily mean °F (°C)	32.4 (0.2)	35.4 (1.9)	45.3 (7.4)	56.2 (13.4)	66.3 (19.1)	75.1 (23.9)	78.1 (25.6)	76.2 (24.6)	69.8 (21.0)	57.8 (14.3)	46.0 (7.8)	36.2 (2.3)	56.2 (13.5)
Mean daily minimum °F (°C)	23.6 (−4.7)	25.8 (−3.4)	34.9 (1.6)	44.8 (7.1)	55.2 (12.9)	64.5 (18.1)	67.6 (19.8)	64.8 (18.2)	57.3 (14.1)	45.5 (7.5)	35.7 (2.1)	27.6 (−2.4)	45.6 (7.6)
Average precipitation inches (mm)	3.22 (82)	3.80 (97)	4.59 (117)	4.52 (115)	5.75 (146)	4.46 (113)	5.28 (134)	3.64 (92)	3.72 (94)	3.90 (99)	3.35 (85)	3.77 (96)	50 (1,270)
Average snowfall inches (cm)	2.3 (5.8)	4.6 (12)	0.2 (0.51)	0.0 (0.0)	0.0 (0.0)	0.0 (0.0)	0.0 (0.0)	0.0 (0.0)	0.0 (0.0)	0.0 (0.0)	0.0 (0.0)	4.7 (12)	11.8 (30.31)
Source: NOAA

=== The River ===
Grayville had been at the northern end of a four-mile-long oxbow bend of the main channel of the Wabash River. The river changed course after a flood in 1985, with the result being that the town is now two miles from the new river channel. Bonpas Creek trickles through a portion of the former river channel, creating continued access to water for canoes, rafts, and extremely shallow-draft small boats.

== Demographics ==
Historical population
Census	Pop.	Note	%±
1880	1,533		—
1890	1,999		30.4%
1900	1,948		−2.6%
1910	1,940		−0.4%
1920	1,749		−9.8%
1930	1,904		8.9%
1940	2,240		17.6%
1950	2,461		9.9%
1960	2,280		−7.4%
1970	2,035		−10.7%
1980	2,313		13.7%
1990	2,043		−11.7%
2000	1,725		−15.6%
2010	1,666		−3.4%
2020	1,550		−7.0%
U.S. Decennial Census

=== 2020 census ===
As of the 2020 census, Grayville had a population of 1,550. The median age was 46.4 years. 19.9% of residents were under the age of 18 and 23.1% of residents were 65 years of age or older. For every 100 females there were 94.2 males, and for every 100 females age 18 and over there were 93.0 males age 18 and over.

0.0% of residents lived in urban areas, while 100.0% lived in rural areas.

There were 683 households in Grayville, of which 25.9% had children under the age of 18 living in them. Of all households, 42.2% were married-couple households, 22.0% were households with a male householder and no spouse or partner present, and 27.8% were households with a female householder and no spouse or partner present. About 34.1% of all households were made up of individuals and 16.5% had someone living alone who was 65 years of age or older. There were 400 families residing in the city.

The population density was 714.29 inhabitants per square mile (275.79/km^{2}). There were 808 housing units at an average density of 372.35 per square mile (143.77/km^{2}), of which 15.5% were vacant. The homeowner vacancy rate was 2.7% and the rental vacancy rate was 12.2%.

Racial composition as of the 2020 census
Race	Number	Percent
White	1,464	94.5%
Black or African American	5	0.3%
American Indian and Alaska Native	1	0.1%
Asian	11	0.7%
Native Hawaiian and Other Pacific Islander	2	0.1%
Some other race	8	0.5%
Two or more races	59	3.8%
Hispanic or Latino (of any race)	25	1.6%

=== Income and poverty ===
The median income for a household in the city was $47,222, and the median income for a family was $58,333. Males had a median income of $41,522 versus $22,500 for females. The per capita income for the city was $24,233. About 14.0% of families and 20.5% of the population were below the poverty line, including 29.5% of those under age 18 and 18.0% of those age 65 or over.

== Transportation ==
In Grayville, Illinois Route 130 meets Illinois Route 1, and Route 1 meets Interstate 64.

Grayville was built on the Wabash River. While it is no longer on any major rail line, it was home to a large rail bridge across the Wabash into Indiana, but sections of that bridge collapsed in January 2005 due to a major flood of the Wabash River.

In late 2005, an ethanol plant was proposed for the Grayville area, and the construction of the plant would have included rebuilding the bridge and rail lines leading to it on both the Indiana and Illinois sides of the river, but as of July 2009, neither the plant nor the bridge have been built.

The largest bridge to Indiana south of Lawrenceville, and the only Interstate link between Illinois and Indiana south of Terre Haute, the I-64 river crossing runs parallel to the collapsed rail bridge, about 1000 feet upstream.
