= First Battle of Manzanillo =

Coordinates: 20°20′36.02″N 77°7′29.37″W

- Part of the Spanish–American War
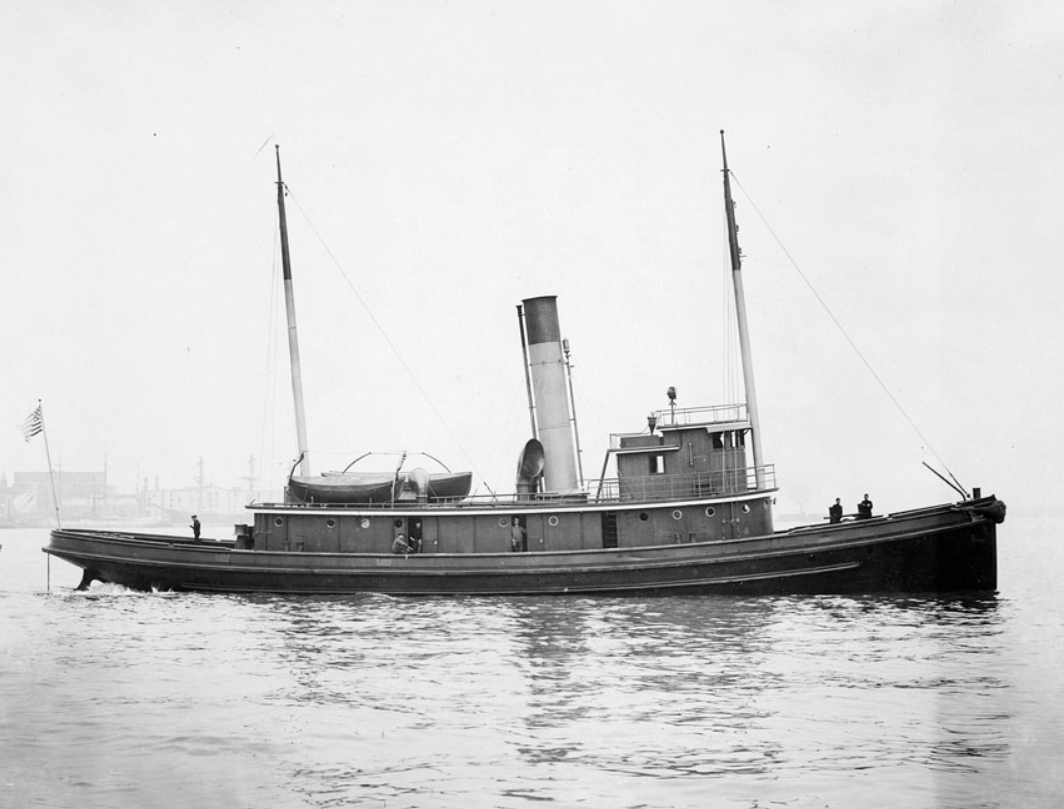
- USS Wompatuck, circa 21 April 1899
Date	30 June 1898
Location	Manzanillo, Cuba
Result	Spanish victory

Belligerents
Spain	United States

Commanders and leaders
Joaquín Barreda	Lucien Young

Strength
4 gunboats 3 pontoons 3 field guns	2 gunboats 1 armed tug

Casualties and losses
2 killed 4 wounded 1 gunboat damaged	1 killed 2 wounded 2 gunboats damaged 1 armed tug damaged

The First Battle of Manzanillo was a series of naval engagements during the Spanish–American War on 30 June 1898 in and outside of the harbor of Manzanillo, Cuba. Three American gunboats were forced to retire after attacking a squadron of Spanish gunboats and auxiliaries.

== Background ==
After the blockade of Santiago, the Spanish attempted to resupply the city by taking in provisions from ports on the southern coast of Cuba that were not blockaded. Aware of the situation, the American consul at Kingston sent word to the military that the Spanish were preparing to send a resupply convoy from that city to the southern coast. To thwart these efforts, on 28 June President McKinley extended the blockade to include the southern coast of Cuba as well as Puerto Rico. In order to enforce the blockade, a flotilla of gunboats and auxiliaries — including the USS Hist, Hornet, and Wompatuck—was sent to patrol the area. The three American vessels began operations by conducting reconnaissance of the area between Santa Cruz and Manzanillo.

== Battle ==
=== Action at Niguero ===
While patrolling near the Niguero Bay, the small, 30 long tons (30 t) Spanish gunboat Centinela was sighted, and the Americans decided to engage her. Since Wompatuck had a deep draft, Hornet and Hist moved in close to engage the vessel. Upon nearing her, Centinela opened fire with her two Maxim guns. Spanish troops from the shore also began firing on the Americans but were chased away when their fire was returned. Centinela′s aft gun was knocked out, and the vessel then attempted to escape by maneuvering behind a small cay out of the Americans' line of sight. This effort proved futile though, since the Americans still managed to hit the vessel, which was run aground by her crew. However, Centinela would later be refloated and join the Spanish squadron at Manzanillo.

=== Action at Manzanillo ===
The three gunboats then continued towards Manzanillo, where they were spotted by a squadron of Spanish vessels which consisted of the gunboats Guantánamo, Estrella and Delgado Parejo, each one crewed by 19 sailors and officers, plus three armed pontoons.

Spanish sources give a fuller and more sobering picture of the defenders. The overall defence of the port was commanded by Teniente de Navío de 1.ª clase Joaquín Gómez de Barreda, a veteran of the Ten Years' War who flew his pennant aboard the Delgado Parejo. This vessel — formerly the American yacht Dart, donated to the Spanish Navy by the Spanish Patriotic Committee of New York — was the largest of the navigable ships at 85 tonnes and was armed with a single 57 mm Hotchkiss gun forward and two 37 mm guns aft. Its original crew of around 25 had been reduced to commander and 19 men by tropical disease and lack of replacements.

The two lanchas cañoneras were even smaller. The Guantánamo (42 t), commanded by Teniente de Navío Bartolomé de Morales y Mendigutía, and the Estrella (42 t), under Teniente de Navío Sebastián Noval, each carried one 42 mm gun and a Maxim 37 mm machine gun, and were likewise crewed by a commander and some 19 men rather than their nominal complement of 25.

The Guardián (65 t), under Teniente de Navío Carlos del Camino, was entirely immobilised by a machinery breakdown and could not get underway; her crew had been reduced to her commander and just four gunners serving her single 42 mm cannon. Two further vessels, the wooden-hulled pontoons Cuba Española and María, were equally incapable of movement. The Cuba Española, a cañonero built at the arsenal of Havana and launched in 1870, was in such poor condition that she had been converted into a floating battery armed with a single antique 130 mm Parrott muzzle-loader with only 30 rounds of ammunition. The María, an old paddle steamer, served as warehouse, barracks and floating battery, also armed with a 130 mm Parrott.

The combined displacement of the three navigable vessels (Delgado Parejo, Guantánamo and Estrella) amounted to just 169 tonnes, less than half that of any single American vessel in the attacking force.

The pontoons were Guardián, crewed by four gunners manning an old Parrott gun, Cuba Española, an old wooden gunboat armed with a Parrott gun and crewed by seven men, and an old sailboat used as a barracks ship. There were also many commercial vessels in port. The Americans opened fire at 15:20, and the Spanish accurately responded, hitting all three of the ships several times. Hist took several hits, including some near its engine room, and Hornet took a disabling shot to its main steam pipe, severely scalding three men, at least one of which died. Contrary to the American reports, Hist did not sink any Spanish boats before Hornet was towed out of action by Wompatuck, which had only been damaged lightly compared to the other American vessels. As Wompatuck began to tow Hornet, the Spanish began to fire on those vessels. Starting to take damage and casualties, the Americans decided to withdraw, since their gunboats' armaments were not enough to destroy the rest of the Spanish squadron.

== Aftermath ==
Two vessels sent to rendezvous with the Americans arrived a day later, and made another attempt at silencing the Spaniards but were also repulsed. The Spanish vessels were later repaired, leaving the squadron mostly intact. More reinforcements would arrive by mid-July, and on the 18th a third decisive engagement was fought, finally destroying the small Spanish fleet once and for all. Although the fleet was destroyed, the town's garrison continued to hold out until August, when the Fourth Battle of Manzanillo was fought.

== See also ==
- Second Battle of Manzanillo
- Third Battle of Manzanillo

== Order of battle ==
Spain

Gunboats

- Estrella
- Guantánamo
- Centinela
- Delgado Parejo

Pontoons

- Maria
- Cuba Española
- Guardián

United States

Gunboats

- USS Hist
- USS Hornet

Armed tugs

- USS Wompatuck

== Sources ==
- Wilson, Herbert Wrigley (1900). The Downfall of Spain: Naval History of the Spanish–American War. Low, Marston and Company.
- Agustín Ramón Rodríguez González (1998). Operaciones de la Guerra de 1898: una revisión crítica. Actas Editorial. ISBN 84-87863-72-8.
