= Thomson Airways Flight 1526 =

2017 aviation incident in the United Kingdom

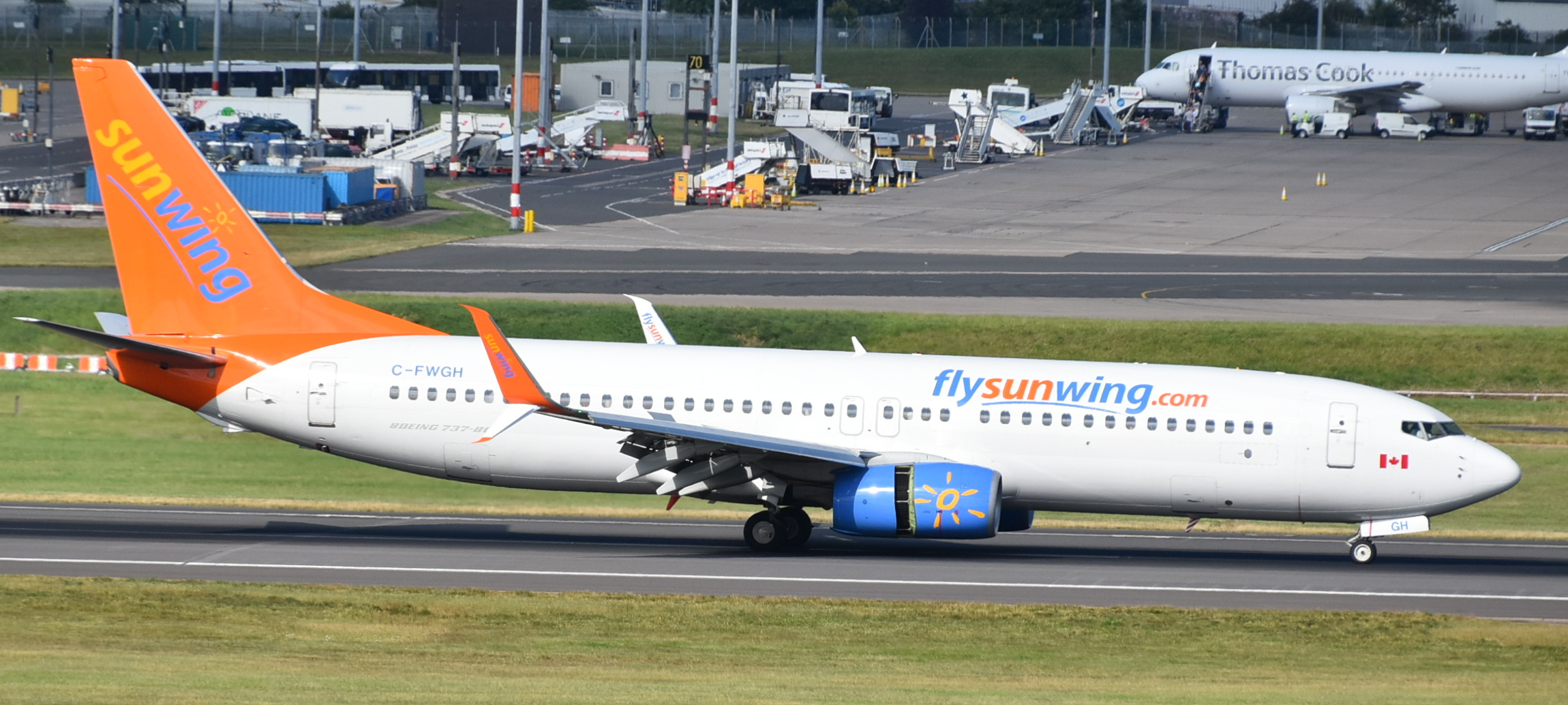
- C-FWGH, the aircraft involved.

Incident
- Date: 21 July 2017
- Summary: Under-powered take-off and collision with runway light
- Site: Belfast International Airport, Northern Ireland

Aircraft
- Aircraft type: Boeing 737-800
- Operator: Sunwing Airlines on behalf of Thomson Airways
- Registration: C-FWGH
- Flight origin: Belfast International Airport, Northern Ireland
- Destination: Corfu, Greece
- Occupants: 185
- Passengers: 179
- Crew: 6
- Fatalities: 0
- Survivors: 185

On 21 July 2017, a Boeing 737-800 belonging to and operated by Sunwing Airlines Inc. and operating as Thomson Airways Flight 1526 from Belfast International Airport and bound for Corfu, Greece with 185 people aboard, suffered a "serious incident" during takeoff, colliding with a runway approach light during departure. The incident was investigated by the Air Accidents Investigation Branch and determined to be the result of an incorrect temperature input into the aircraft's flight computer resulting in underperformance at take-off. The area beyond the runway and the terrain beyond were largely unobstructed, and the aircraft eventually climbed away undamaged. The remainder of the flight to Corfu was uneventful. The "serious incident" at take-off was realized and reported when airport staff subsequently observed minor ground damage. The investigation report concluded that the crew could not reasonably have been expected to recognize the anomalously low speed sooner or intervene more effectively. The report listed several examples of aircraft underperformance at takeoff, reviewed the history of relevant industry efforts, and recommended that a Takeoff Acceleration Monitoring System and associated certification standards should be developed without further delay.

== Incident ==
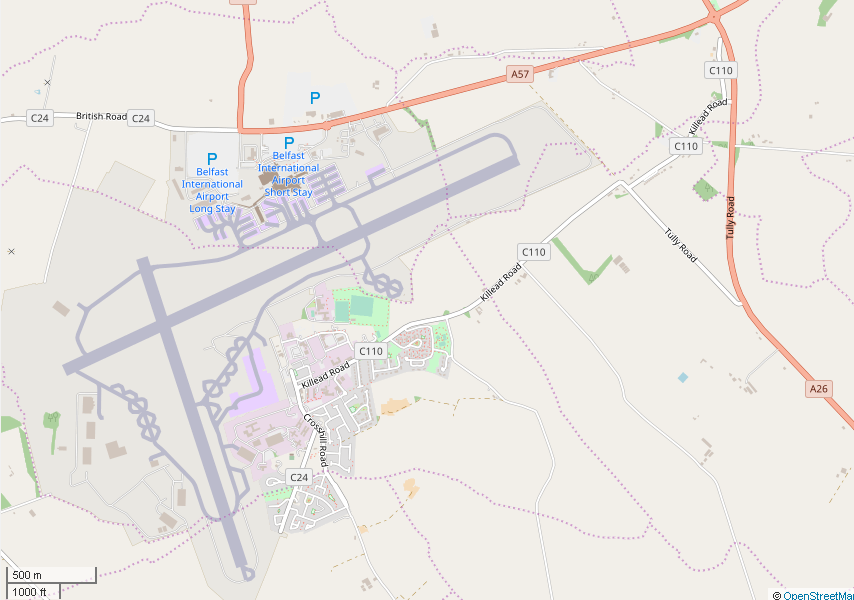
Map of Belfast International Airport

The outside air temperature was 16 °C (61 °F), but the operating crew entered incorrect figures (variously −47 °C (−53 °F) and −52 °C (−62 °F)) for the airport outside air temperature, into the flight management computer, resulting in miscalculation of the required N_{1}, the engine fan speed (low-pressure compressor speed) required on the take-off run. (Both incorrect figures appeared as OATs on the flight plan: -47 °C at the first waypoint after top-of-climb, -52 °C at top-of-climb. Delays around reporting the incident meant that the Cockpit Voice Recorder information was not available for the investigation.)

When the co-pilot returned from the exterior inspection, he listened to the ATIS to find out the runway in use and the weather conditions. Using the passenger and baggage figures from the ground handling company, and the weather information from the ATIS, each pilot completed weight and balance, and performance calculations independently on his EFB. These calculations were then crosschecked before the information was entered into the FMC. The flight crew then completed a taxi and takeoff briefing covering items such as the expected taxi and departure routing and including a discussion on the handling of emergencies during the takeoff and departure. At some point during the cockpit preparation, [the first incorrect] figure of -47 °C was entered into the FMC as the outside air temperature (OAT).

— AAIB, Report on the serious incident to Boeing 737-86J, C-FWGH | Belfast International Airport on 21 July 2017

As the aircraft departed Runway 07, the crew noticed unusually slow acceleration as well as a low climb rate, a fact noted by witnesses on the ground. Shortly after lifting off the runway one of the aircraft's landing gear collided with a supplementary runway approach light. The light was knocked loose from its mounting and crushed while the 737 suffered no damage. Crewmembers were not made aware of the incident until ATC personnel at Belfast airport filed an incident report with the AAIB.

== Aircraft ==
The incident aircraft was a Boeing 737-86J(WL) owned and operated by Sunwing Airlines, with Canadian aircraft registration C-FWGH. The aircraft was manufactured in 2011, entered Sunwing Airlines fleet in 2015, and had accumulated 19,654 airframe hours. At the time of the incident Thomson Airways had leased the aircraft for the summer season from 29 April until 31 October 2017.

== Analysis ==
Usage of inaccurate takeoff data can be fatal, as it can lead to runway overruns and possibly collisions with obstructions, as happened in a 2004 accident at Halifax Airport in which seven people died.

Neither the installed flight management computer software nor the Electronic flight bags (EFBs) in use helped in detecting the data input error. A recent software release had not yet been installed, and the software omitted the cross-check of the pilot input data against the outside air temperature actually measured. The pilot became aware of the aircraft's underperformance late in the take-off run but did not intervene effectively. The Report explored various human-factors aspects of the incident, concluding that the pilots could not reasonably have been expected to respond more quickly to the developing situation, either before or after becoming airborne. It reviews and lists recent incidents of aircraft underperformance at take-off, reviews industry efforts to provide automatic warning in such situations, and calls for closer regulatory attention to pilots' portable computers ('electronic flight bags').

This incident was included in discussions of proposed new aircraft equipment:

- Extended duration of the CVR (Cockpit Voice Recorder)
- Takeoff Performance Monitoring System (TOPMS) or Takeoff Acceleration Monitoring System (TAMS). A 2019 research paper explores the cause of this serious incident, caused by erroneous data entry. The paper "summarises a basic takeoff acceleration monitoring system and the effect this would have had on the July 2017 event".
