= Sunwing Vacations Group =

Travel and holiday companies of Canada

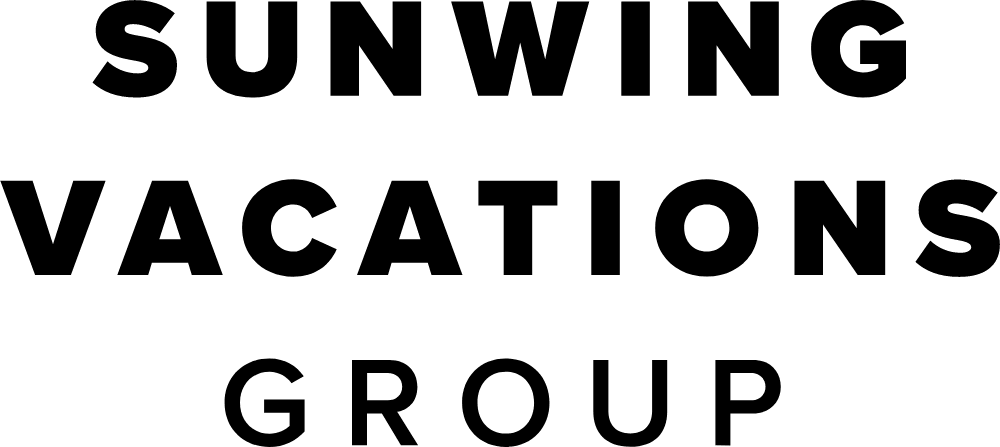
- Type: Private
- Industry: Conglomerate
- Founded: 2002; 24 years ago
- Founder: Colin Hunter
- Headquarters: Toronto, Ontario, Canada
- Area served: Global
- Key people: Stephen Hunter (CEO, president); Andrew Dawson (COO)
- Products: Commercial aviation; Retail; Travel
- Owners: WestJet
- Number of employees: 17,000 (2023)
- Divisions: SellOffVacations.com
- Subsidiaries: Sunwing Vacations; WestJet Vacations; WestJet Vacations Quebec; Vacation Express; LUXE Destination Weddings
- Website: www.sunwingvacationsgroup.com

Sunwing Vacations Group, formerly known as Sunwing Travel Group, is a Canadian subsidiary of the WestJet Group, and became one on May 1, 2023. It is headquartered in Toronto, Ontario, Canada. Today, it operates as the leisure division of the WestJet Group; according to its website, the group forms "the largest vacations brand in North America."

Following the acquisition, Sunwing Vacations Group operates the following entities:

- Canadian leisure tour operators: Sunwing Vacations, WestJet Vacations, and WestJet Vacations Quebec.
- US presence: Vacation Express, catering to American travelers.
- Travel retail businesses: SellOffVacations.com and Luxe Destination Weddings.

== History ==
=== Founding and early growth (2002–2005) ===
Sunwing Group was founded in 2002 by Colin Hunter. By 2004, Sunwing had become the second largest tour operator in Ontario. On November 17, 2005, Sunwing Airlines' inaugural flight, a Boeing 737-800, departed from Toronto Pearson International Airport.

=== Expansion through acquisitions (2009–2011) ===
In 2009, Sunwing Group embarked on a strategic expansion, announcing the acquisition of tour operator Signature Vacations and its SellOffVacations.com retail division from UK-based TUI Travel. This acquisition led to TUI gaining a 49 percent ownership stake in Sunwing Travel Group, and Stephen Hunter stepping into the role of CEO, succeeding his father.

In 2010, Sunwing Travel Group acquired Caribbean NexusTours, a tour operator in the Dominican Republic and Mexico. The company was renamed NexusTours and remains a separate company within Sunwing Travel Group.

In 2011, Sunwing Travel Group announced that it would enter the European market with a seasonal service from Canada to Europe. However, this initiative did not materialize as expected, and there have been no records of regular flights to Europe under the Sunwing banner since this announcement. Later that year, Sunwing Travel Group further diversified its portfolio with the purchase of Luxe Destination Weddings. This acquisition allowed Sunwing to offer a wider range of services to its customers, particularly in the area of destination weddings.

In 2012, Sunwing Travel Group acquired the Atlanta-based tour operator Vacation Express for an undisclosed sum. The acquisition was the group's entrance to the US market.

In 2015, Sunwing Group announced that affiliate, Blue Diamond Resorts, would open a 600-room resort in Jamaica. Later that year, the company began construction on $400 million resort in Antigua with 500 rooms.

=== Integration with WestJet Group (2023–present) ===
Sunwing Travel Group became a subsidiary of the WestJet Group on May 1, 2023, following an acquisition announced in March 2022. This merger aimed to consolidate market share by combining two major players in the Canadian travel industry. The acquisition significantly strengthens WestJet's position, particularly in vacation packages and sun destinations. Through the merger, the group also expanded its service offerings after gaining access to Sunwing's expertise in vacation packages, allowing it to offer a more comprehensive range of travel solutions to its customers. The combined entity anticipated cost efficiencies and operational improvements through the integration of resources and processes.

As of February 13, 2024, Sunwing continues to operate as a separate brand and entity within the WestJet Group. However, full integration of Sunwing Airlines into WestJet's core operations is expected by May 2025. Sunwing Vacations will maintain its current branding throughout the integration process under the Sunwing Vacations Group umbrella.

On May 14, 2024, Sunwing Travel Group announced the launch of WestJet Vacations Quebec (Vacances WestJet Quebec), a new vacation provider specifically catering to Quebec residents. This offering focuses on all-inclusive getaways to 20 popular sun destinations across the Caribbean, Central America, and Mexico. The provider will offer packages from three airports in Quebec: Montréal–Trudeau International Airport, Québec City Jean Lesage International Airport and CFB Bagotville.

== Subsidiaries ==
=== Current ===
| Company | Sector | Notes |
|---|---|---|
| LUXE Destination Weddings | Retail | Founded in 2005. |
| SellOffVacations.com | Retail | Acquired from Signature Vacations-TUI Travel 2009. |
| Sunwing Vacations | Travel | Founded 2002. |
| Vacation Express | Travel | Founded in 1989 in the U.S. and acquired by Sunwing Travel Group in 2011. |
| WestJet Vacations | Travel | Acquired from the WestJet-Sunwing merger. WestJet Vacations was moved from the WestJet brand to the Sunwing Vacations Group. |
| WestJet Vacations Quebec | Travel | Launched for all-inclusive getaways to 20 sun destinations catered to Quebec residents, with flights from Montreal, Quebec City and Saguenay-Bagotville. |

=== Former ===
| Company | Sector | Notes |
|---|---|---|
| Signature Vacations | Travel | Founded in 1972 in Toronto and acquired as a division of First Choice Canada (and itself a subsidiary of UK based First Choice) in 2009. Merged with Sunwing Vacations. |
| Blue Diamond Resorts | Travel | Founded 2011. Blue Diamond Resorts operates as a separate company and is one of Sunwing's resort partners and suppliers. Sunwing Vacations does not manage or operate Blue Diamond Resorts properties. |
| TravelSmart Vacation Club | Hospitality | Established in 2012. |
| Sunwing Airlines | Travel | Founded in 2005. Sold to WestJet in 2023. |
| NexusTours | Travel | Operating for over two decades and acquired by Sunwing in 2010. |
