= Be Like My Child =

Be Like My Child (Watashi no Kodomo ni Narinasai)

Studio album by Miyuki Nakajima
- Released: March 18, 1998
- Recorded: at the Ocean Way Recording, Record One (Los Angeles, U.S.); Epicurus, Burnish Stone, One Voice, and the Woodstock Studios (Tokyo, JP), in June 1997 – February 1998
- Genre: Folk rock
- Length: 59:19
- Label: Pony Canyon/AARD-VARK
- Producer: Ichizo Seo, Miyuki Nakajima

Miyuki Nakajima chronology
Paradise Cafe (1996)	Be Like My Child (Watashi no Kodomo ni Narinasai) (1998)	Sun: Wings (1999)

Be Like My Child (わたしの子供になりなさい, Watashi no Kodomo ni Narinasai) is the 25th studio album by Japanese singer-songwriter Miyuki Nakajima. The album came out a month after a single "Another Name for Life", which was featured as a theme song for TV drama Seija no Koushin aired on TBS and became a smash hit on the charts.

Be Like My Child features the new recording of "Another Name for Life", and "An Affectionate Tale" which was released as a lead single in November 1997. The album also includes three remake versions of the songs that she wrote for other artists in 1997; "Streams of Hearts" recorded by Faye Wong (appeared on her eponymous album), "You Don't Know" by Satoko Ishimine, and "Sea of Night Lights" by Naoto Takenaka (appeared on his Siesta? album).

Like its predecessor Paradise Cafe, Be Like My Child suffered from lackluster commercial performance. The album has sold only 100,000 copies to date, although it had initially shipped over 200,000 units and received Gold accreditation by the RIAJ upon its release. It became the artist's first studio album not to reach the top-ten on the chart in 20 years.

== Track listing ==
All songs written and composed by Miyuki Nakajima, arranged by Ichizo Seo (except "Be Like My Child" and "You Don't Know" co-arranged by David Campbell).

1. "Be Like My Child (わたしの子供になりなさい, Watashi no Kodomo ni Narinasai)" – 4:47
2. "Downtown Queen and Uptown Rebel (下町の上、山の手の下, Shitamachi no Jou, Yamanote no Ge)" – 5:05
3. "Another Name for Life (命の別名, Inochi no Betsumei)" [Album Version] – 5:29
4. "Streams of Hearts (清流, Seiryū)" – 5:16
5. "In the Spring (私たちは春の中で, Watashitachi wa Haru no Naka de)" – 4:16
6. "An Affectionate Tale (愛情物語, Aijou Monogatari)" – 4:46
7. "You Don't Know" – 5:42
8. "Thursday Night (木曜の夜, Mokuyou no Yoru)" – 5:15
9. "Sea of Night Lights (紅灯の海, Koutou no Umi)" – 6:24
10. "4.2.3." – 12:19

== Personnel ==
- Miyuki Nakajima – Lead and harmony vocals
- Gregg Bissonette – Drums
- Kenny Aronoff – Drums
- Hideo Yamaki – Drums
- Neil Stubenhaus – Electric bass
- Meggen Hagiwara – Electric bass
- Bob Glaub – Electric bass
- Dean Parks – Acoustic guitar, electric guitar
- Michael Thompson – Electric guitar, acoustic guitar, slide guitar
- Nozomi Furukawa – Electric guitar
- Susumu Nishikawa – Electric guitar
- Yoshiaki Kanoh – Electric guitar
- Hirokazu Ogura – Electric guitar
- Jon Gilutin – Keyboards, acoustic piano, hammond organ,
- Yasuharu Nakanishi – Keyboards, acoustic piano
- Shingo Kobayashi – Keyboards
- Elton Nagata – Keyboards
- Joe Sublett – Tenor sax
- Keishi Urata – Computer programming
- Larry Corbett – Cello
- David Campbell – Strings arrangement & conductor
- Ichizo Seo – Strings arrangement, keyboards
- Suzie Katayama – Strings conductor
- Julia Waters – Backing vocals
- Maxine Waters – Backing vocals
- Oren Waters – Backing vocals
- Keiko Wada – Backing vocals
- Yuiko Tsubokura – Backing vocals
- Mai Yamane – Backing vocals

== Charts ==
=== Weekly charts ===
Chart (1998)	Position
Japanese Oricon Albums Chart	11
Japanese Oricon Albums Chart	26 †

†: Limited edition issued on APO-CD

=== Year-end charts ===
Chart (1998)	Position
Japanese Albums Chart	208

=== Certifications ===
Region	Certification	Certified units/sales
Japan (RIAJ)	Gold	200,000^{^}
^{^} Shipments figures based on certification alone.
