= Sun: Wings =

Studio album by Miyuki Nakajima
- Released: November 3, 1999
- Studios: Ocean Way (Hollywood); A&M (Los Angeles); Cello (Hollywood); Epicurus (Tokyo)
- Genre: Folk rock
- Length: 55:23
- Labels: Pony Canyon/AARD-VARK, Yamaha Music Communications
- Producers: Ichizo Seo, Miyuki Nakajima

Miyuki Nakajima chronology
Be Like My Child (Watashi no Kodomo ni Narinasai) (1998)	Sun: Wings (1999)	Moon: Wings (1999)

Sun: Wings (日-WINGS, Hi -Uingusu) is the 26th studio album by Japanese singer-songwriter Miyuki Nakajima.

In November 1999, it was simultaneously released with another album Moon: Wings which has a similar concept. Both albums contain the songs written for the series of Yakai, which had been her conventional plays performed over each December from 1989 through 1998.

Nakajima had a duet with Fumikazu Miyashita on the third track "Into a Dream Someday", a song arranged by David Campbell who also worked on most of Nakajima's albums recorded in the 1990s. Likewise, on the sixth track "I Don't Know Your Language", Campbell's spouse Raven Kane was featured on vocals.

To promote the album, a music video of the lead-off track was filmed. However, along with its follow-up, Sun became one of Nakajima's least successful albums in terms of sales. After those albums were released, she left Pony Canyon which she had belonged to since debut.

== Track listing ==
All songs written and composed by Miyuki Nakajima, arranged by Ichizo Seo (except "Into a Dream Someday" arranged by David Campbell).

1. "Bamboo Song (竹の歌, Take no Uta)" – 5:53
2. "Never Cry over Spilt Milk" – 5:33
3. "Into a Dream Someday (いつか夢の中へ, Itsuka Yume no Naka e)" – 4:49
4. "Sheep's Words (羊の言葉, Hitsuji no Kotoba)" – 4:54
5. "A Foreign Woman (異国の女, Ikoku no On-na)" – 6:25
6. "I Don't Know Your Language (あなたの言葉がわからない, Anata no Kotoba ga Wakaranai)" – 8:34
7. "Shipwrecked (難破船, Nanpasen)" – 5:31
8. "An Acquaintance, a Friend, a Mistress, or a Wife to Be (知人･友人･愛人･家人, Chijin, Yūjin, Aijin, Kajin)" – 4:17
9. "Good Morning, Ms. Castaway" – 4:22
10. "In the Swirls of Time (明日なき我等, Asu Naki Warera)" – 5:55

== Personnel ==
- Kenny Aronoff – drums
- Gregg Bissonette – drums, cymbals
- Hideo Yamaki – cymbals
- Lee Sklar – bass
- Bob Glaub – bass
- Neil Stubenhaus – bass
- Michael Thompson – electric guitar, acoustic guitar
- Donald Ferrone – bass
- Chiharu Mikuzuki – bass
- Micheal Fisher – percussion
- Yasuharu Nakanishi – keyboards, synth bass
- Elton Nagata – keyboards
- Ichizo Seo – keyboards
- Jon Gilutin – keyboards, acoustic piano, electric piano, programming, pad, Indian pipe
- Shingo Kobayashi – keyboards, programming
- Keishi Urata – programming, drum-loop, percussion loop, sound effect
- Seiichi Takubo – programming, drum-loop, percussion loop, sound effect
- Manabu Ogasawara – programming, drum-loop
- Yosuke Sugimoto – programming
- David Campbell – strings conducting
- Suzie Katayama – strings conducting, cello, accordion
- Larry Corbett – cello
- Daniel Smith – cello
- Steve Richards – cello
- Oscar Meza – cello, bass
- Sid Page – violin (concertmaster), fiddle
- Joel Derouin – violin (concertmaster)
- Eve Butler – violin
- Berj Garabedian – violin
- Armen Garabedian – violin
- Gerrardo Hilera – violin
- Mario De Leon – violin
- Erza Kliger – violin
- Susan Charman – violin
- John Wittenberg – violin
- Murray Adler – violin
- Michele Richards – violin
- Edmund Stein – violin
- Brian Leonard – violin
- Robert Peterson – violin
- Peter Kent – violin
- Ruth Bruegger – violin
- Virginia Frazier – violin
- Robert Becker – viola
- Matt Funes – viola
- Scott Haupert – viola
- Denyse Buffum – viola
- Matthew Funes – viola
- Renia Koven – viola
- David Stenske – viola
- Karie Prescott – viola
- Sheridon Stokes – recorder
- Earle Dumler – oboe
- Kazuyo Sugimoto – lead and backing vocals
- Fumikazu Miyashita – harmony and backing vocals
- Julia Waters – backing vocals
- Maxine Waters – backing vocals
- Oren Waters – backing vocals
- Yoko Kubota – backing vocals
- Katsumi Maeda – backing vocals
- Yoshihiko Shibata – backing vocals
- Midori Sakaeda – backing vocals
- Tatsuo Ogura – backing vocals
- Gen-ichiro Nakajima – backing vocals
- Koujiro Takizawa – backing vocals
- Kazuaki Anzai – backing vocals
- Rick Logan – backing vocals
- John Batdorf – backing vocals
- Joe Pizzulo – backing vocals
- Raven Kane Campbell – vocals

== Chart positions ==
Year	Chart	Position	Sales
1999	Japanese Oricon Weekly Albums Chart (Top 100)	18 (CDDA)	49,000+
1999	Japanese Oricon Weekly Albums Chart (Top 100)	26 (APO-CD)	49,000+

== Release history ==
Country	Date	Label	Format	Catalog number
Japan	November 3, 1999	Pony Canyon	CD	PCCA-01378
Japan	November 3, 1999	Pony Canyon	APO-CD	PCCA-01379
Japan	November 21, 2001	Yamaha Music Communications	CD	YCCW-00031
Japan	November 5, 2008	Yamaha Music Communications	CD	YCCW-10078
