= Sierra Maestra Airport =

Regional airport that serves Manzanillo, Cuba

Sierra Maestra Airport Aeropuerto Internacional Sierra Maestra
- IATA: MZO; ICAO: MUMZ

Summary
- Airport type: Public
- Operator: ECASA
- Serves: Manzanillo
- Elevation AMSL: 34 m / 112 ft
- Coordinates: 20°17′20″N 077°05′12″W

Map
- Location in Cuba

Runways
Direction	Length		Surface
Direction	m	ft	Surface
08/26	3,000	9,843	Asphalt
- Source: Aeronautical chart

Sierra Maestra Airport (Spanish: Aeropuerto Internacional Sierra Maestra) (IATA: MZO, ICAO: MUMZ) is a regional airport that serves the city of Manzanillo in Cuba.

== Facilities ==
The airport has only one terminal handling domestic and international flights. No air bridges are available and passenger must use air stairs and walk to or from tarmac to the terminal. Besides currency exchange booth and VIP lounge there are no other services inside the terminal. Refreshment vendors are located outside the terminal.

== Airlines and destinations ==
As of 2025, there are no recurring scheduled or charter services to or from the airport.

== Ground transport ==
Taxis and prearranged buses from tour groups are only means to connect from airport to the city.
