= USS Frolic (1892) =

Patrol vessel of the United States Navy

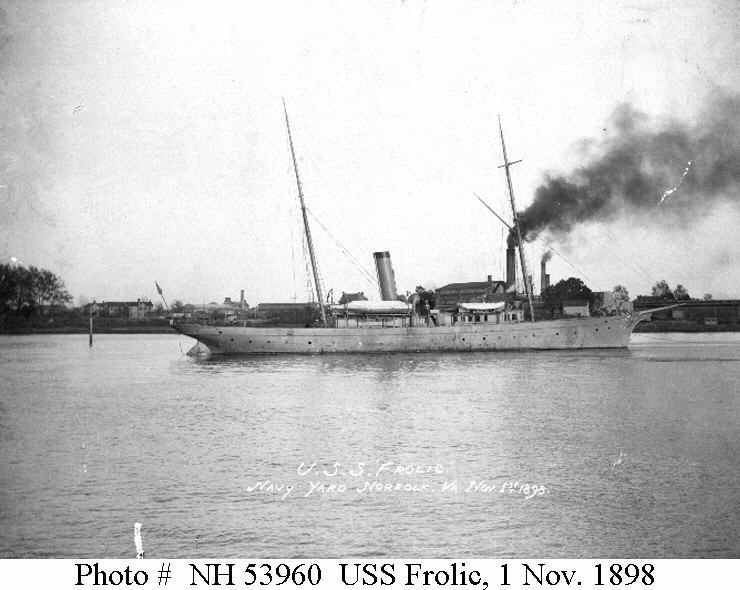
- USS Frolic off Norfolk Navy Yard at Portsmouth, Virginia, on 1 November 1898.

History

United States
- Name: Frolic
- Namesake: A "frolic" is a happy and festive occasion
- Builder: Globe Iron Works, Cleveland, Ohio
- Yard number: 46
- Launched: 24 December 1891
- Completed: 1892
- Acquired: 28 May 1898
- Commissioned: 6 July 1898
- Recommissioned: 25 October 1900 (first time); 19 December 1906 (second time, in reduced status)
- Decommissioned: 27 September 1898 (first time); 31 March 1906 (second time); 31 July 1907 (third and final time)
- Identification: Official Number: 126888 (yacht); Signal (Navy) GQKF
- Fate: Transferred to United States Department of War 21 May 1909
- Notes: In private use as yacht Comanche 1892–1898; in United States Army service from 1909

General characteristics
- Type: Patrol yacht
- Displacement: 607 long tons (617 t)
- Length: 165 ft (50 m)
- Beam: 25 ft (7.6 m)
- Draft: 18 ft (5.5 m)
- Depth of hold: 10 ft 4 in (3.15 m)
- Speed: 11 kn (13 mph; 20 km/h)
- Armament: 2 × 3-pounder (47 mm (1.85 in)) guns

The third USS Frolic was a United States Navy patrol yacht in commission in 1898, from 1900 to 1906, and from 1906 to 1907. She served briefly during the Spanish–American War.

== Construction, acquisition, and commissioning ==
Frolic was built for H. M. Hanna in 1892 by Globe Iron Works at Cleveland, Ohio, yard number 46, as the private yacht Comanche, official number 126888. The U.S. Navy purchased her on 28 May 1898 for service during the Spanish–American War and commissioned her as USS Frolic on 6 July 1898.

== Service history ==
=== Spanish–American War ===
Frolic departed Portsmouth, New Hampshire, on 23 July 1898 with mail for ships of the North Atlantic Station on Spanish–American War duty off Cuba and Puerto Rico. The war ended in August 1898 while she was performing these duties. She arrived at Norfolk Navy Yard at Portsmouth, Virginia, on 17 September, and was decommissioned there on 27 September.

=== Post-war ===
Frolic was recommissioned on 25 October 1900. Assigned to the Asiatic Station, she cleared Hampton Roads, Virginia, on 30 December bound for the Mediterranean Sea, the Suez Canal, and finally Cavite on Luzon in the Philippine Islands, where she arrived on 24 April 1901.

Cooperating with the United States Army in the Philippine–American War, Frolic patrolled the southern Philippines, serving primarily off Samar. Several times during the next year, she aided ships in distress, and from October 1902 made hydrographic surveys. She performed a variety of other duties in establishing American control in the Philippines, including investigation of possible telegraph sites and transport duty.

In February 1904, Frolic added patrols and target practice in Chinese waters to her operating schedule at intervals.

Frolic was decommissioned on 31 March 1906. After repairs, was placed in reduced commission on 19 December 1906 for service as a yard craft at Cavite.

Frolic was decommissioned for the last time on 31 July 1907.

== Final disposition ==
On 21 May 1909, Frolic was transferred to the United States Department of War for U.S. Army service in the Philippines.
