= Manzanillo, Cuba =

Manzanillo
- Municipality
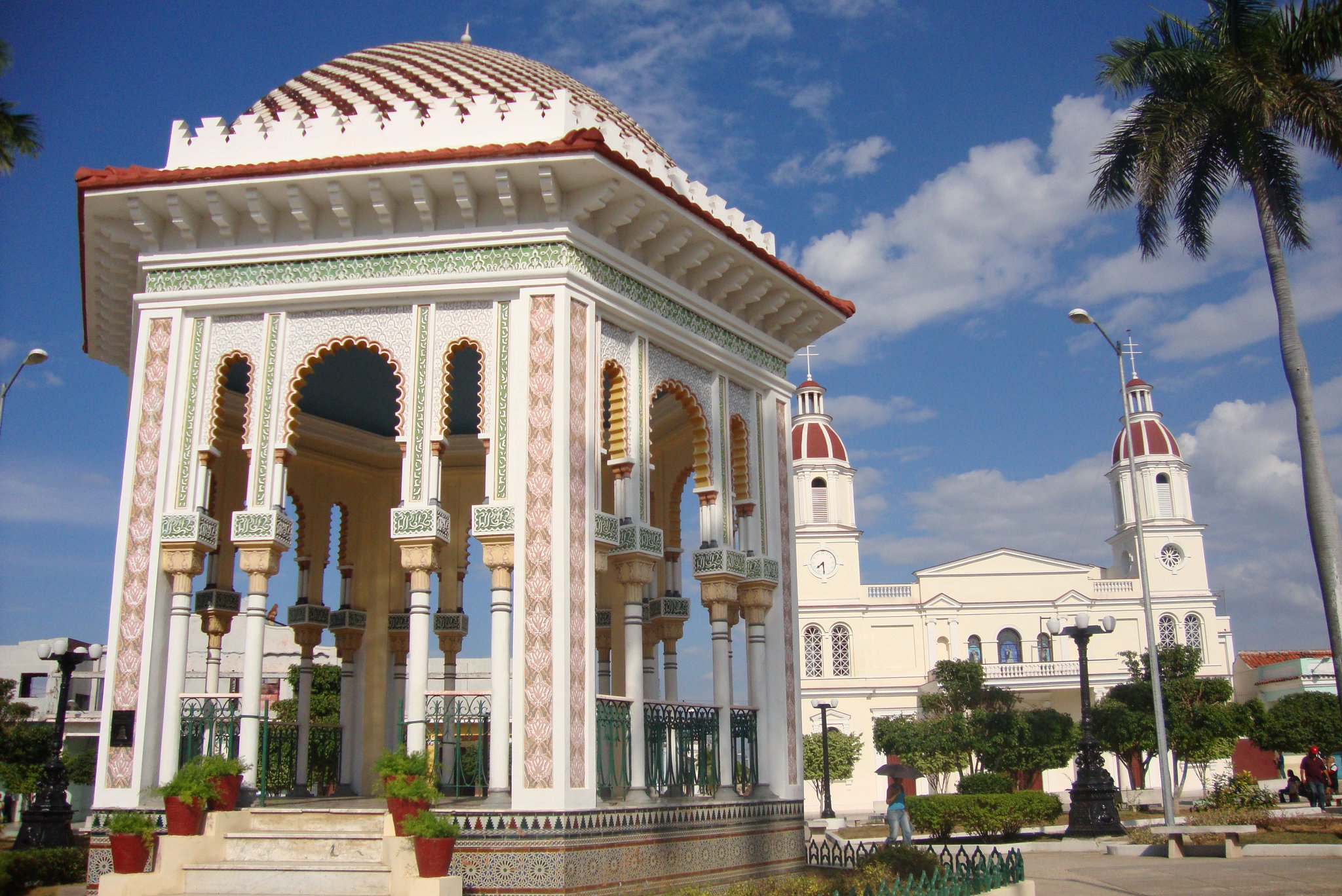
- The Glorieta of Manzanillo

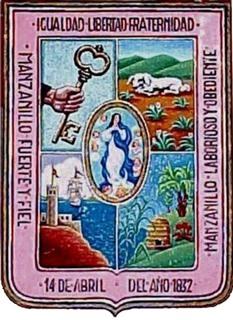
- Seal

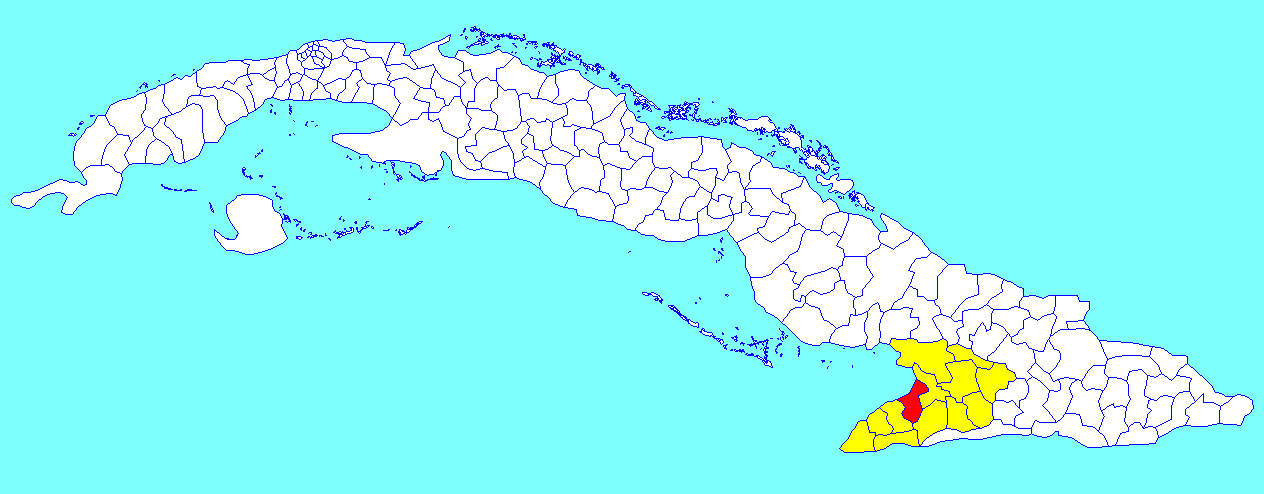
- Manzanillo municipality (red) within Granma Province (yellow) and Cuba
- Coordinates: 20°20′23″N 77°06′31″W
- Country: Cuba
- Province: Granma
- Established: January 6, 1840

Government
  - President: Rossio Naranjo Figueredo

Area
  - Total: 498 km^{2} (192 sq mi)
- Elevation: 25 m (82 ft)

Population (2022)
  - Total: 123,542
  - Density: 248/km^{2} (643/sq mi)
- Demonym: Manzanillero/a
- Time zone: UTC-5 (EST)
- Postal code: 87510
- Area code: +53 23
- Website: https://www.manzanillo.gob.cu/es/

Manzanillo is a municipality and city in the Granma Province of Cuba. By population, it is the 14th-largest Cuban city and the most populated one not being a provincial seat.

== Geography ==
It is a port city in the Granma Province in eastern Cuba on the Gulf of Guacanayabo, near the delta of the Cauto River. Access by sea is limited by the coral reefs of Cayo Perla.

The municipality is divided into the barrios of Primero, Segundo, Tercero, Cuarto, Quinto y Sexto (part of the city of Manzanillo), as well as the rural communities of Blanquizal, Calicito, Canabacoa, Caño, Ceiba Caridad, Congo, Jibacoa, Palmas Altas, Purial, Remate, Tranquilidad and Zarzal.

== History ==
Manzanillo was founded in 1784. The settlement was sacked by the French in 1792, and in the following year a fort was built for its protection. In 1833 it received an ayuntamiento (council) and in 1837, for its "loyalty" in not following the lead of Santiago in proclaiming the Spanish Constitution, received from the crown the title of Fiel. In 1827 the port was opened to commerce, national and foreign. It was the site of three battles during the Spanish–American War.

== Economy ==
Local agriculture is based on raising coffee, sugarcane, rice, fruit and tobacco crops, as well as honey and cattle.

Local industry is composed of sawmills, fish-canning, molasses plants, as well as some cigar and leather goods factories.

Zinc and copper deposits are present in the municipality.

== Demographics ==
In 2022, the municipality of Manzanillo had a population of 123,542. With a total area of 498 km^{2} (192 sq mi), it has a population density of 250/km^{2} (650/sq mi).

== Culture ==
Manzanillo is also home of the medical science faculty of the University of Granma.

There is a large crocodile sanctuary located near the city.

== Transport ==
The city is crossed by the state highway Circuito Sur de Oriente (CSO) and by the highway 17 to Las Tunas. The railway station is the western terminus of a line from Bayamo, and is served by regional and long-distance trains, the latter linking the city with Santiago de Cuba, Guantánamo, Camagüey, Ciego de Ávila, Santa Clara and Havana.

== Notable people ==
- Joaquin Ferrer (1929–2022), painter
- Mario Girona (1924–2008), architect
- Bartolomé Masó (1830–1907), military and patriot
- Rosa Porto (1930–2019), baker, businesswoman in Los Angeles
- Carlos Puebla (1917-1989), singer, guitarist, and composer

== See also ==
- Sierra Maestra Airport
- Municipalities of Cuba
- List of cities in Cuba
