= Walter S. Crosley =

Walter Selwyn Crosley
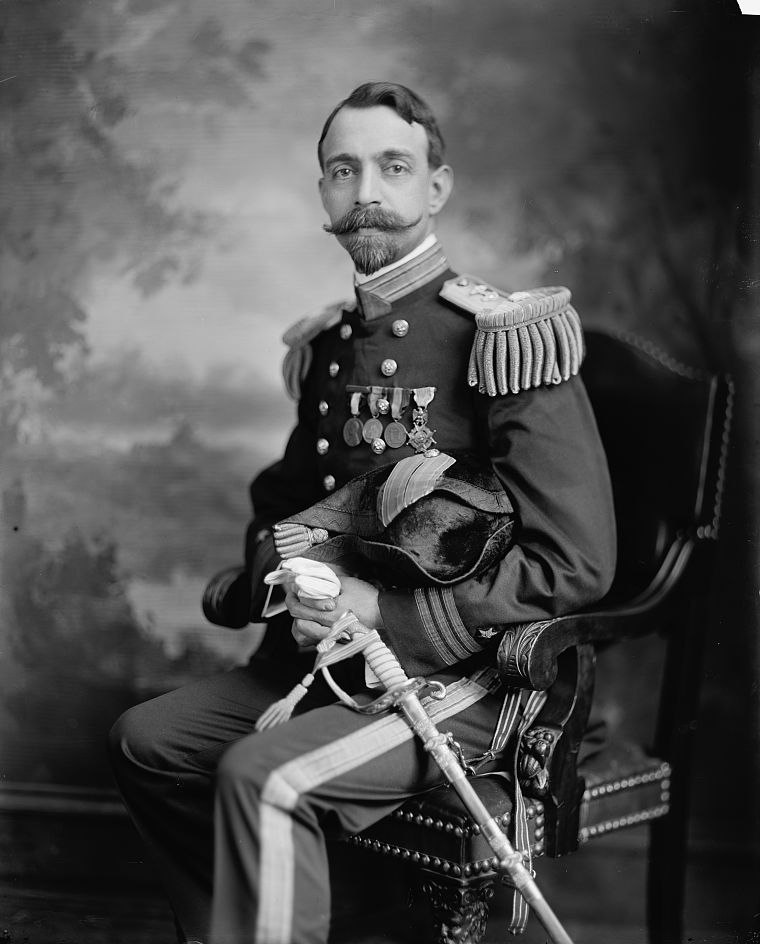
- RADM Walter S. Crosley, as a commander, c. 1912
- Born: 30 October 1871; East Jaffrey, New Hampshire, U.S.
- Died: 6 January 1939 (aged 67); Baltimore, Maryland, U.S.
- Military career
- Allegiance: United States of America
- Branch: United States Navy
- Service years: 1893–1935
- Rank: Rear Admiral
- Commands: USS Algonquin USS Leyden USS Truxton USS Scorpion USS Prairie USS Rhode Island; USS Seattle; Seventh Naval District; Naval Station Key West; USS Idaho; Train Squadron ONE, Scouting Fleet Base Force; Ninth Naval District; Naval Station Great Lakes; Battleship Division 3, Battle Force; Fifteenth Naval District; Naval Station, Balboa, Canal Zone
- Conflicts: Spanish–American War: Battle of Nipe Bay; Battle of Fajardo; Philippine–American War; Haitian Campaign; Dominican Campaign; World War I
- Awards: Navy Cross

Walter Selwyn Crosley (30 October 1871 – 6 January 1939) was an officer in the United States Navy. He was a recipient of the Navy Cross, the second highest military decoration for valor. He subsequently advanced to the rank of rear admiral, to date from February 17, 1927, and was transferred to the Retired List in that rank on November 1, 1935.

== Biography ==
Walter Selwyn Crosley was born in East Jaffrey, New Hampshire, on October 30, 1871, the son of a Universalist Church pastor. He was appointed to the U. S. Naval Academy from the Fourth Congressional District of Connecticut and entered on September 9, 1889. He graduated on June 2, 1893, and served the two years at sea then required by law as a Passed Midshipman, first assigned to the Naval Academy training ship USS Bancroft and next to the new cruiser, USS Detroit that was at Rio de Janeiro, Brazil, during the naval revolt against the Brazilian Government. In March 1894 he was attached to the USS Charleston that sailed by way of the Straits of Magellan to Mare Island Navy Yard on her way to the Asiatic Station. The ship arrived at San Francisco in July 1894 during a railroad strike and while at Mare Island, Passed Midshipman Crosley was given command of a detail that manned a Gatling gun loaded on a flat car ahead of a locomotive with the purpose of dissuading the strikers so that trains might proceed without altercation.

== Sino-Japanese War ==
Crossing the Pacific, Charleston arrived at Yokohama, Japan during the Sino-Japanese War and proceeded to Chemulpo, Korea whence Passed Midshipman Crosley was sent to Seoul with a United States Marine guard as security for the American Legation. Promoted to ensign on July 1, 1895, he remained at sea and during the next three years served on the USS Minneapolis, USS Indiana, and USS Porter. On March 31, 1898, he joined the USS Mayflower as watch and division officer. On April 2, that year he assumed his first sea-command, the USS Algonquin, and a month later was transferred to command of the American Civil War era armed- tug USS Leyden.

== Spanish American War ==
=== Cuban Campaign ===
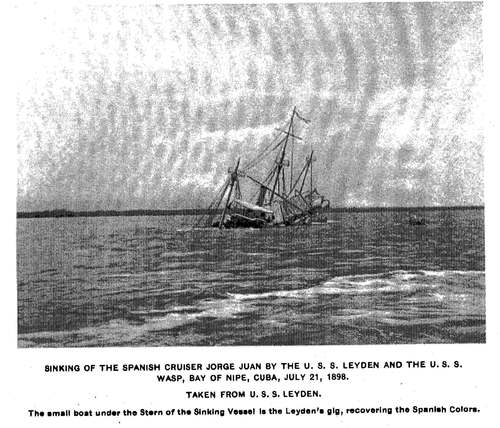
Sinking of the Spanish cruiser Jorge Juan by the USS Leyden, Battle of Nipe Bay, July 1898

During the Spanish–American War he was advanced two numbers in rank for eminent and conspicuous conduct on July 21, 1898, during the Battle of Nipe Bay. Commanding Leyden, part of a squadron that included the USS Annapolis, USS Topeka and USS Wasp. Crosley took the lead in crossing a minefield in the dangerous, narrow channel. On entering under musketry fire from shore, together with Wasp, they discovered the Spanish gunboat Jorge Juan and engaged in a heated action until the remaining ships of the squadron arrived, at which time the enemy vessel was abandoned and sunk.

=== Puerto Rican Campaign ===
Two weeks later, at the Battle of Fajardo during the Puerto Rican Campaign, broadsides from Ensign Crosley's Leyden supported a landing party of thirty-five bluejackets from the coastal monitor USS Amphitrite that occupied the Cape San Juan lighthouse and defended sixty women and children of the prominent families of Fajardo that had sought the Americans' protection from a superior Spanish force of about one-hundred to one-hundred and fifty troops and cavalry the night of August 8–9, 1898. The Spaniards abandoned the attack after a couple of hours and with no American casualties. The next morning the women and children were embarked on Leyden which transported them to Ponce, Puerto Rico.

== Philippine Insurrection ==
On September 12, 1898, Crosley reported to the training ship USS Constellation and was on duty at the Naval Academy from September 22, 1898, until April 1899, when he was ordered to the USS Monongahela as watch and division officer, with the rank of Lieutenant (junior grade). He reached the Asiatic Station, reporting to the flagship USS Baltimore as Aide on the Staff of the Commander in Chief, U.S. Asiatic Fleet, Rear Admiral John C. Watson on June 30, 1899. He volunteered for duty against the Insurrectos, and on October 8, 1899, in an engagement at Noveleta, Cavite, Philippine Islands, he was wounded when "a spent ball" struck his leg.

== Inter-war years ==
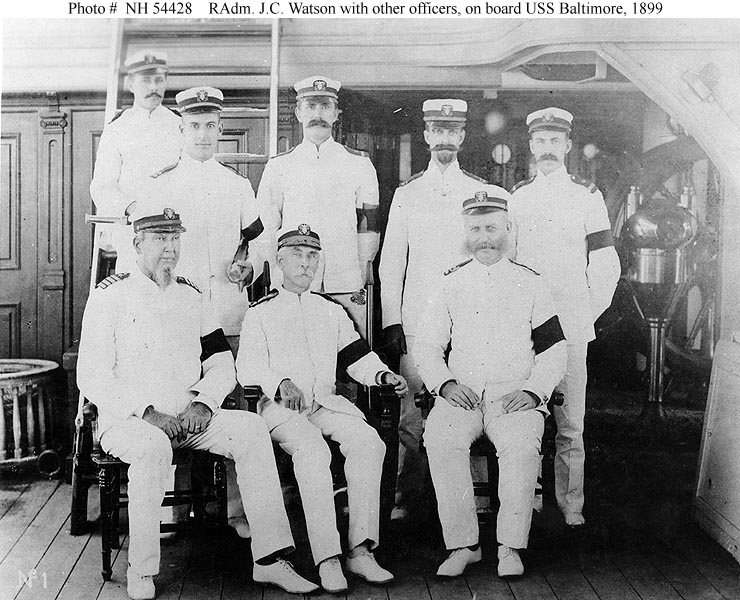
Ensign Walter S. Crosley, standing, second from right, staff of Admiral John C. Watson, USS Baltimore

In December 1899, he transferred to the USS Brooklyn and remaining as aide on the staff, returned to the Baltimore on April 16, 1900. Commissioned lieutenant from March 3, 1901, he returned to the United States via the Monongahela, and served as watch and division officer on board until April 1902, when he reported for duty with the General Board, Navy Department, Washington, D.C. In January 1904, Lieutenant Crosley joined the USS Iowa, and in April that year, assumed command of the USS Truxton. On March 9, 1905, he was ordered to the USS Maine for duty as flag lieutenant on the staff of Rear Admiral Robley D. Evans, the first commander in chief, US Atlantic Fleet, and second in rank to Admiral of the Navy George Dewey.

Promoted to lieutenant commander in 1906, in December that year he was detached from staff duty and began a tour of shore duty as assistant to the equipment officer at the New York Navy Yard and later served in the Ordnance Department of that Yard. He had temporary duty on board the USS New York, taking passage on February 26, 1909, and from March 7 until June 27, he served as executive officer and navigator of the USS Des Moines. He had similar duty on board the USS Celtic until November, when he reported as navigator of the USS Vermont. In July 1910 he had special temporary duty in the Bureau of Navigation, Navy Department, Washington, D.C., and on August 4, 1910, took command of the USS Scorpion in English waters. In 1912 he was advanced to commander and served as aide to Vice Admiral Hugh Pigot Williams of the Royal Navy. Detached from the Scorpion in April 1912, he returned to Washington, where he again served on the General Board of the Navy Department.

== Haitian and Dominican Campaigns ==
In July 1914 he was detached to the USS Florida as executive officer. Promoted to captain, from June 30, 1915, he commanded the USS Prairie. Prairie was ordered to Haiti and Santo Domingo, Dominican Republic during the American occupations, where Captain Crosley received fleeing foreign residents aboard his ship and landed forces that occupied the West Indies islands.

== World War I ==
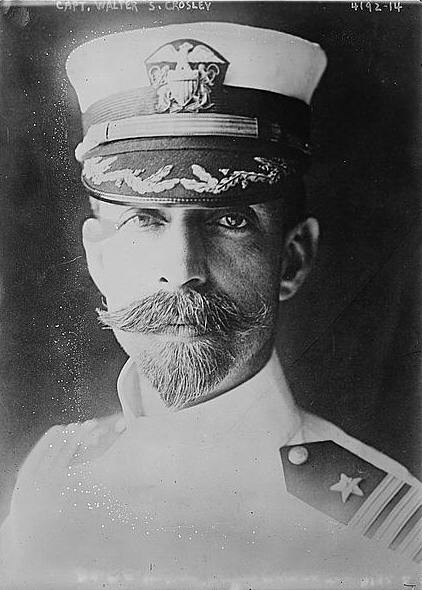
Captain Walter S. Crosley, USN

After being detached from Prairie in February 1917, he was ordered to Berlin as assistant naval attaché; however, relations were severed with Germany before his arrival. His orders were changed to report to Petrograd, Russia as Naval Attaché. He and his wife reached that city by way of Japan, Korea, China, and Siberia on May 7, 1917, a month after the United States entered World War I. The following year in Russia was one of constant danger for Captain and Mrs. Crosley. The Tsar's Government was disintegrating and in July 1917, when Bolsheviks captured Petrograd, the Crosleys were safely escorted under cover of night to the American Embassy by a Russian officer who risked his life to assist them. With the danger unacceptable for the mission, in April 1918, Crosley was ordered to leave Russia by way of Finland and Sweden. The Crosleys made their escape with the assistance of the American ambassador. During one night's train ride to Helsingfors, Finland, their passports were demanded nineteen times. In Finland, Captain Crosley took charge of a party of sixteen Americans and a Roumanian diplomat who had been trying to leave Russia for weeks. As they neared the frontier, Crosley arranged a truce between the Reds and Whites, whereby the party crossed the ice escorted by a Red general carrying a large American flag. Finally reaching Stockholm, Sweden, Captain Crosley received orders there to proceed to Madrid, Spain, as naval attaché, where he reported on May 10, 1918, and remained until the Armistice.

== Navy Cross ==
In 1920, Captain Crosley was awarded the Navy Cross for his Russian diplomatic service in World War I. His citation reads, "For distinguished service in the line of his profession as Naval Attaché at Petrograd, and for conducting a party of Americans out of Russia in April 1918, under difficult and trying conditions."

== Postwar service ==
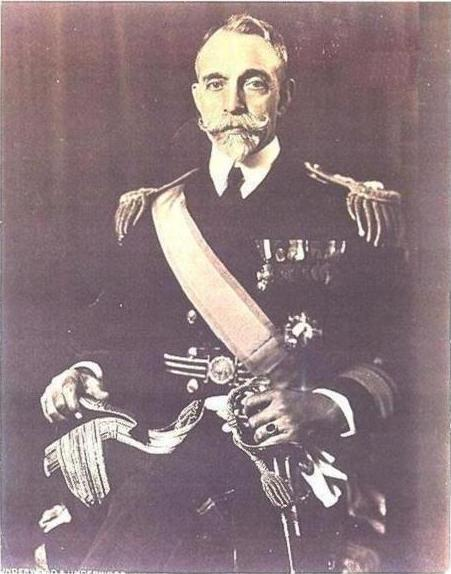
RADM Walter S. Crosley, USN, about 1927

In December 1918, he reported to the Office of Naval Intelligence, Navy Department, and on January 26, 1919, assumed command of the USS Rhode Island that was engaged in returning troops from France. He was transferred in May 1920 to command the USS Seattle doing similar transport duty for returning troops. On March 21, 1921, Crosley became assistant to the commandant of the Sixth Naval District, Charleston, South Carolina. A month later he was designated commandant of the Seventh Naval District, Key West, Florida, with additional duty as commandant of the Naval Station and Naval Operating Base, Key West, and remained there until May 1923.

After duty afloat in command of the USS Idaho from June 11, 1923, until June 1925, he served as hydrographer, Bureau of Navigation, Navy Department, from June 29, 1925, until July 1927. As such he represented the United States in Monaco at the International Hydrographic Conference, arriving October 22, 1926, There he was elected by the delegates of twenty-three countries represented to preside over the conference. During his tour of duty as hydrographer, he also served as a member of the United States Geographic Board. After his promotion to rear admiral in January 1927 (to rank from February 17, 1927) he was ordered to command Train Squadron ONE, Scouting Fleet Base Force, and remained in that command from August 1, 1927, until June 29, 1929. He again represented the United States as a delegate to the International Hydrographic Conference meeting in the Principality of Monaco on April 1, 1929, and upon his return had further temporary duty at the Hydrographic Office, Navy Department, before resuming command of Train Squadron ONE, his flag in the USS Antares.

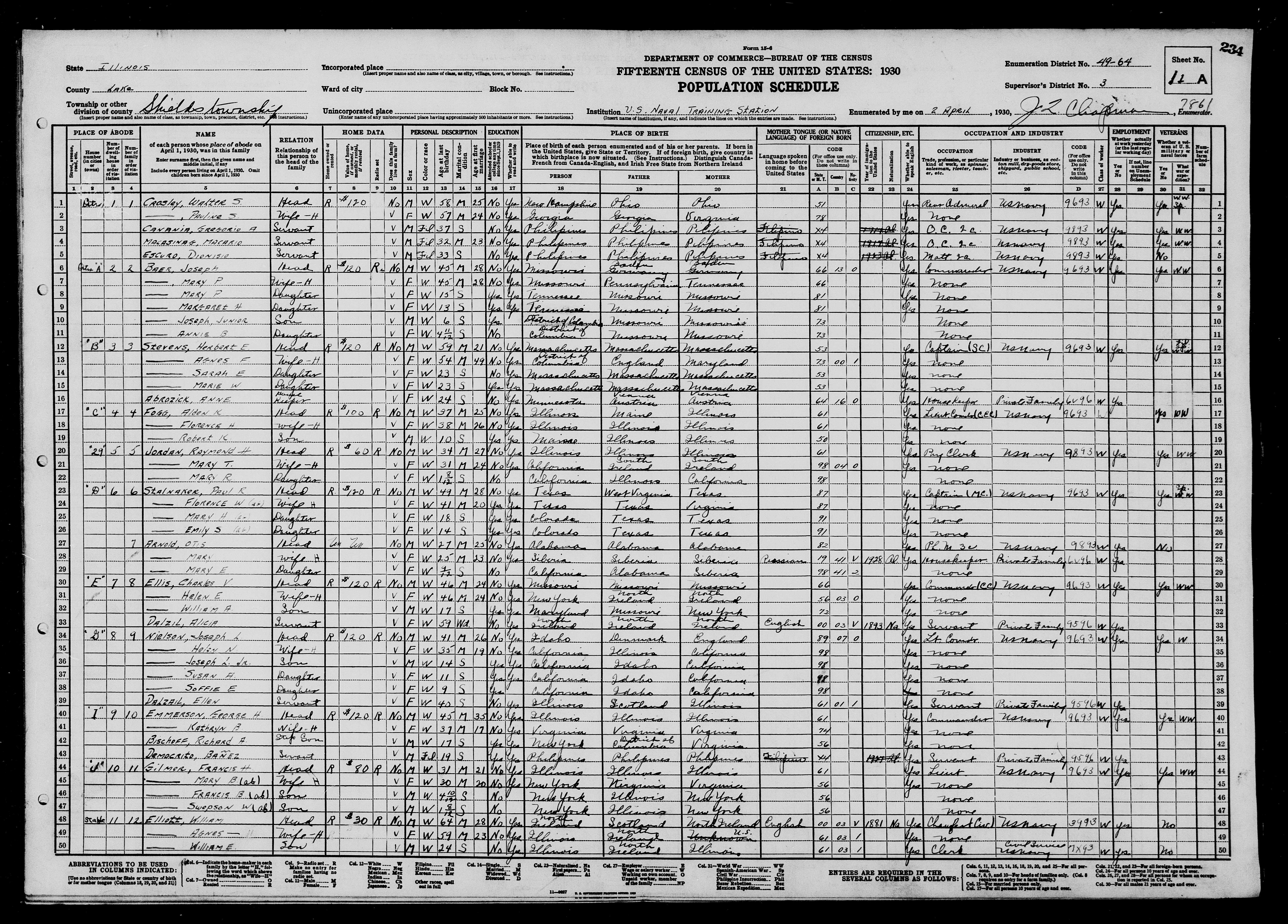
1930 Census Record - Great Lakes Naval Station

On July 1, 1929, Rear Admiral Crosley reported as commandant of the Ninth Naval District, and commanding officer of the Naval Training Station, Great Lakes, Illinois. While in that assignment he served as a member of the Committee on Arrangements for the Century of Progress Expositions. Detached on August 2, 1932, he assumed command of Battleship Division 3, Battle Force, with his flag in the USS Tennessee and later in the USS Arizona and USS Nevada. When detached on June 9, 1933, he was ordered to duty as commandant of the Fifteenth Naval District and commanding officer of the Naval Station, Balboa, Canal Zone. He served two years in that assignment, then had duty in July and August 1935 as a member of the General Board, Navy Department.

Rear Admiral Crosley was transferred to the Retired List of the U.S. Navy on November 1, 1935, and was relieved of all active duty, having reached the statutory retirement age of sixty-four years. He received a commendatory letter from the Secretary of the Navy, the Honorable Claude Swanson, as follows: "The Department regrets your retirement from active service and takes this occasion to extend to you its heartiest congratulations and appreciation for your long and distinguished service to our Nation. During the time which you have so faithfully and efficiently served, you have witnessed many advancements in the morale, strength and efficiency of the navy; and you have the satisfaction of knowing that you have contributed to the accomplishment of these results. . . ."

== Retirement ==
After his retirement, Admiral Crosley was elected president director of the International Hydrographic Bureau at Monte Carlo, Monaco, in April 1937, and served in that capacity until his resignation in June 1938 on account of ill health. He died on January 6, 1939, at Johns Hopkins Hospital in Baltimore, Maryland, and was buried at Arlington National Cemetery.

Admiral Crosley was a member of the Sons of the American Revolution.

== Family ==
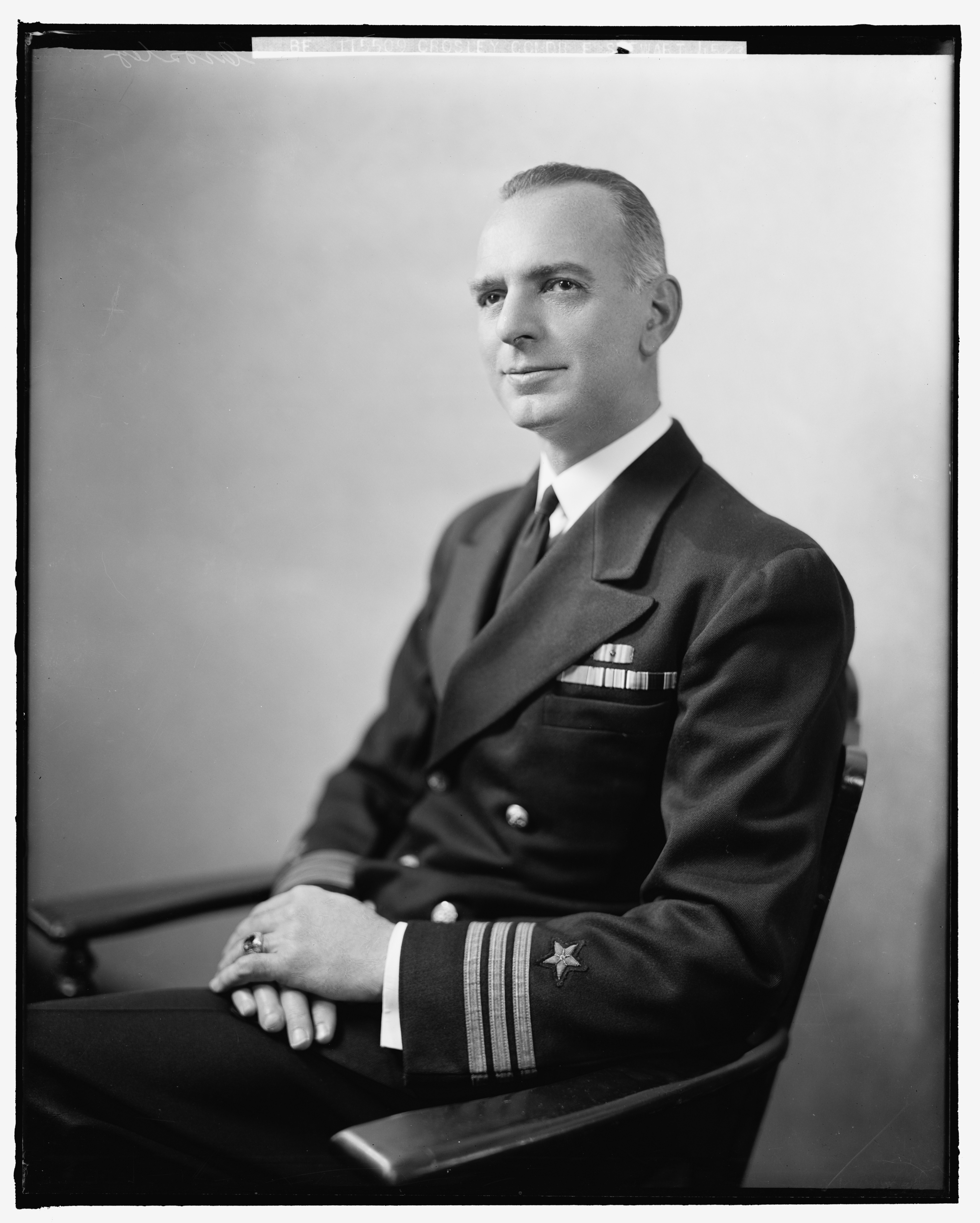
Commander Floyd S. Crosley, c. 1944

In 1895, Ensign Crosley married Pauline de Lannay Stewart (1871–1955) of Columbus, Georgia. They had two sons, Floyd Stewart Crosley (1897–1979) and Paul Cunningham Crosley (1902–1997). Both Crosley's sons graduated from the Naval Academy Classes of 1919 and 1925, respectively, and both retired as navy captains. In 1921, Lieutenant Floyd Crosley was seriously injured while serving as engineering officer on the USS Kennedy (DD-306) when a boiler gauge exploded during a full-power trial run. Called to the fire-room by a report that a boiler had lost water, he reached there in time to receive the full force of the exploding glass that caused the loss of his right eye. He retired in 1926 but returned to active duty in October 1942 during World War II and served as a commander for the duration. His younger brother, Paul Crosley, served more than thirty years active duty in the navy, through World War II and the Korean War.

== Awards and decorations ==
In addition to the Navy Cross, Rear Admiral Crosley received the following medals: Sampson Medal with USS Leyden ship's bar; Spanish Campaign Medal; Philippine Campaign Medal; Haitian Campaign Medal (1915); Dominican Campaign Medal; and World War I Victory Medal with Overseas Clasp. He also received the following foreign decorations: Medal of Honor and Merit and Diploma awarded by the President of the Republic of Haiti; Second Order of Wen-Hu, awarded by the Chinese Ministry of the Navy; and Commander of the Order of the Iron Crown, conferred by the Italian Government.

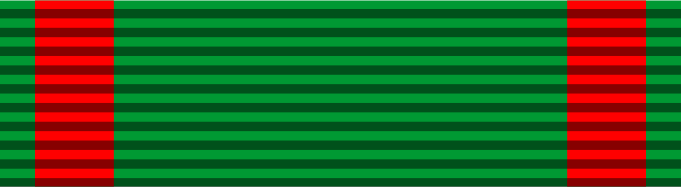

1st Row	Navy Cross		
2nd Row	Sampson Medal	Spanish Campaign Medal	Philippine Campaign Medal
3rd Row	Haitian Campaign Medal	Dominican Campaign Medal	World War I Victory Medal with Overseas Clasp
4th Row	Haiti, Medal of Honor and Merit	Chinese Order of Wen-Hu, 2nd Class	Italy, Commander of Order of the Iron Crown

== Namesake ship ==
Mrs. Walter S. Crosley was Sponsor for the destroyer escort USS Crosley (DE-226) named in honor of her husband and launched on January 1, 1944. Prior to its commissioning on October 22, 1944, the ship was converted to a high speed transport and re-designated USS Crosley (APD-87).
