= Stupka =

'Stupka' is an old Slovak, Czech, and Ukrainian surname meaning 'level', 'leg', 'mortar', 'step', and possibly 'dance step'. The exact definition of the word 'Stupka' can be found in the official Slovak Online Dictionary. The immigration patterns of Slavic peoples in the last century have probably caused the name to become prominent in Slovakia, Czech, Ukraine, but also in other Slavic countries outside its original loci or 'center of origin', as such, it may refer to:

- Bohdan Stupka, popular Ukrainian actor and the minister of culture
- František Stupka (1879–1965), Czech conductor
- Loddie Stupka, United States Navy sailor
- Václav Stupka, Slovak professional ice hockey player
