= USS Algonquin (tug) =

Tugboat of the United States Navy

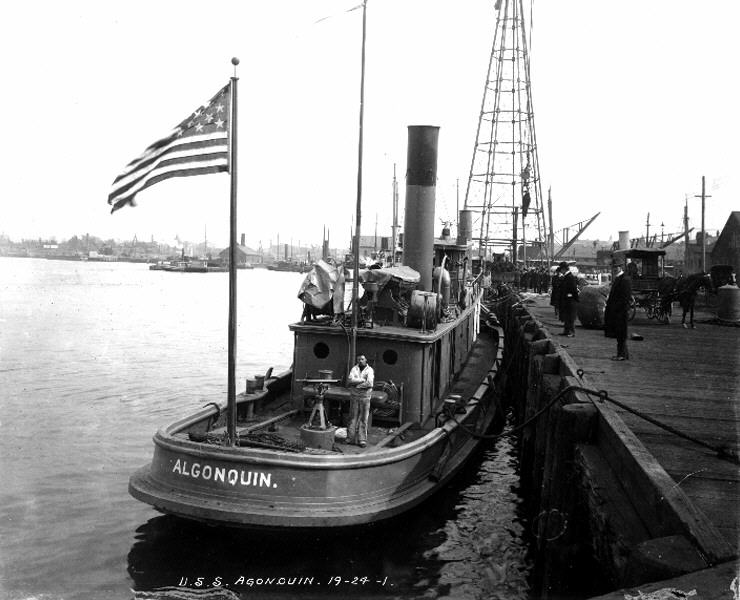
- USS Algonquin (1898–1946) At the New York Navy Yard, Brooklyn, New York, circa April 1898. Note 6mm Colt machine gun and 13-star boat flag aft, and horse cart on pier

History

United States
- Name: El Toro (1891–1898); Algonquin (1898); Accomac (1898–1918); Nottoway (1918–1942); YT-18 (1942–1944); YTL-18 (1944–1946)
- Namesake: A native American people that inhabited the Ottawa River valley
- Builder: Newport News Shipbuilding, Newport News, Virginia
- Launched: 1891
- Acquired: by purchase, 26 March 1898
- Commissioned: 2 April 1898, as USS Algonquin
- Out of service: 3 April 1946
- Reclassified: YT-18, 17 July 1920
- Stricken: 17 April 1946
- Fate: Sold, 15 October 1946

General characteristics
- Type: Tugboat
- Tonnage: 130.16 GRT
- Displacement: 187 long tons (190 t)
- Length: 90 ft (27 m)
- Beam: 19 ft (5.8 m)
- Draft: 9 ft (2.7 m)
- Depth: 10 ft 9 in (3.28 m)
- Propulsion: Quadruple expansion steam engine
- Speed: 10 knots (19 km/h; 12 mph)
- Complement: 12
- Armament: 1 × 6-pounder (2.7 kg) gun

USS Algonquin, completed as El Toro in 1891 for the Southern Pacific Railroad's Morgan Line, was a small harbor tug commissioned by the United States Navy 2 April 1898. Renamed Accomac, after Accomac, Virginia, June 1898, renamed Nottoway in 1918 and, after the Navy adopted alphanumeric hull numbers on 17 July 1920, classified as YT-18, a district tug. On 5 October 1942 the name was cancelled and the tug was simply YT-18 until 1944 when classification was changed to YTL-18, a little harbor tug. Over the years as a Navy tug, from 1898 to 1946, the tug served from Cuba to Boston.

== Construction ==
The steam tug El Toro was built at Newport News, Virginia by Newport News Shipbuilding for the Southern Pacific Railroad Company owned Morgan Line with delivery 20 May 1891. (Note: A second El Toro was built and delivered to the line March 1907 by Harlan & Hollingsworth, Wilmington, Delaware. A third was launched 10 March 1924 by New Jersey Dry Dock & Transportation Company. Both companies later became parts of the Bethlehem Steel Company shipbuilding component.) The tug was designed by naval architect Horace See with a quadruple expansion steam engine, then an unusual feature. El Toro was built principally as a fire boat with towing capability to tow the Morgan Line ships arriving or departing New York between the passenger terminal at North River Pier 37 and the cargo terminal at Pier 25. El Toro was the second ship, hull number 2, constructed by the then small shipyard, and its success led to building the line's cargo and passenger ships El Sud (hull #3), El Norte (#4), and El Rio (#5) and El Cid (#6) as its next four ships.

The See designed quadruple expansion steam engine had cylinders of 9.75 in (24.8 cm), 13.5 in (34 cm), 18.75 in (47.6 cm) and 26 in (66 cm) with 22 in (56 cm) stroke connected to two opposed cranks each driven by two cylinders arranged in tandem and driving a 7 ft (2.1 m) propeller. Steam at 180 pounds (82 kg) pressure was provided by a two furnace steel return tube type boiler 9.5 ft (2.9 m) in diameter by 10.5 ft (3.2 m) in length. Two Worthington fire and bilge pumps provided water for fire fighting or bilge pumping.

A summary of the previous year written in 1895 gives a picture of the tug's duties:

- Steamships towed from Company's piers to Erie Basin, (Note: Erie Basin is located in Brooklyn's Red Hook area.) or distance equal thereto: 70
- Steamships towed from piers Nos. 37 to 25: 132
- Steamships docked at piers Nos. 37 and 25: 152
- Lighters towed and moored: 520
- Miles run without tow: 5342
- On fire duty: Remaining time
- Days in commission: 351
- Coal consumed per day" 1 1/6 tons.

El Toro was the flagship of the New York Naval Reserve and in 1891 the new tug is noted as taking the commander to the exercise while flying the new flag of the Naval Reserve.

== Navy purchase and service ==
Due to the impending war with Spain El Toro was purchased by the Navy on 26 March 1898 and commissioned on 2 April 1898 with the name USS Algonquin, Ensign Walter S. Crosley in command.

Ensign Crosley described his reporting to the New York Navy Yard on 1 April 1898 with orders to report as a watch standing officer aboard USS Mayflower and, upon being redirected to "fit out and command" Algonquin to be ready for sea immediately only to find the old Morgan tug as an "April Fool's joke." Crosley found there was no crew and that fitting out meant acquiring nearly everything from hawsers to stores, which he had to load aboard himself from a commandeered horse cart. With six men sent from USS Vermont on 2 April the tug was put into commission at two p.m. with final crew, including a sixty-one-year-old that had not been to sea in twenty-five years reporting to assist the captain in getting to Key West, Florida, still assembling on the evening of 3 April.

Algonquin departed the Navy Yard on the afternoon of 4 April for Key West, Florida with a quickly assembled crew, only two of which had been in the Navy and only four had been to sea, in company with the tug Nezinscot commanded by Lieutenant York Noble. Nezinscot turned back while still in Buttermilk Channel with Algonquin continuing alone, reaching Scotland Lightship at about eight in the evening, until suffering weather damage to a hatch cover and having to seek shelter behind the Delaware Breakwater for pumping out. After a delay of nearly a day the tug got underway for Port Royal, South Carolina where Nezinscot caught up and, on meeting more poor weather on the way south, took the smaller and slower Algonquin in tow until breaking down and then being towed by Algonquin until reaching the fleet at Key West on 13 April.

Once with the fleet the tug made regular trips to Cuba towing captured vessels to Key West and making logistics runs that included dispatches and even laundry, the loss of which in an involved the tug almost sinking when seas swept over the ship taking boxes and the laundry from lashings on top of the deck house. The tug had left Key West overloaded and nearly sank off Cuba, being taken in tow by USS Iowa with all hands aboard the tug bailing as the pumps would not work. After arrival at Key West the fleet's commander-in-chief declared Algonquin unfit for such service whereupon Ensign Crosley was offered and took command of USS Leyden.

On 15 June 1898, Algonquin was renamed Accomac. (Note: A Revenue Cutter Service ship Algonquin was ordered into Naval service 24 March 1898 – 17 August 1898 and thus the tug's rename was probably the result to avoid confusion.) The vessel served at Key West through end of the year. In January 1899, she was reassigned to the Cuban occupation forces and was based at Havana, Cuba. Between late 1900 and December 1911, the small ship successively served as a yard tug at Port Royal, South Carolina, Key West, and Pensacola, Florida. On 14 February 1907 she sank the tugboat Florence Witherbee in a collision off the Palafox Street Wharf, Pensacola, Florida. On 4 December 1911, Accomac arrived at the Boston Navy Yard where she spent the remainder of her active career. She was renamed Nottoway on 1 August 1918.

On 17 July 1920 the Navy adopted the alphanumeric system of hull designations with Nottoway being designated YT-18. On 5 October 1942, her name was cancelled, and she became simply YT-18. On 15 May 1944, the tug was redesignated a small harbor tug, YTL-18. She served at Boston as a yard tug through the end of World War II.

YTL-18 was placed out of service at Boston on 3 April 1946, and her name was struck from the Navy List on 17 April 1946. On 15 October 1946, she was sold to Mr. Arthur M. Hall, of Boston, Massachusetts, presumably for scrapping.

== Awards ==
- Sampson Medal
- Spanish Campaign Medal
- World War I Victory Medal
- American Defense Service Medal
- American Campaign Medal
- World War II Victory Medal

== Bibliography ==
- Beale, Edwin I. (1907). Highways & Byways of the Virginia Peninsula. Newport News, Virginia: E. I. Beale. LCCN 07009602.
- Colton, T. (2 May 2014). "Newport News Shipbuilding, Newport News VA". Shipbuilding History.
- Crosley, W. S. (March 1899). "Some Experiences On A U. S. Naval Tug-Boat". Proceedings of the United States Naval Institute. 25 (1). Annapolis, Maryland: United States Naval Institute: 65.
- Cressman, Robert J. (13 May 2013). "Algonquin". Dictionary of American Naval Fighting Ships. Naval History & Heritage Command.
- Howell, G. Foster (1896). Steam Vessels and Marine Engines. New York: The American Shipbuilder.
- "The Naval Reserve Drill". The Illustrated American. 7 (77). New York: The Illustrated American Publishing Company. 8 August 1891.
- Richards, John, ed. (April 1895). "Engineering Notes". Industry. No. 81. San Francisco: Industrial Publishing Company. p. 246.
- Duplicate DANFS entries are at ''Accomac'' and Nottoway
