= Ernest H. Bjorkman =

United States Navy Medal of Honor recipient

- Born: December 18, 1881; Malmö, Sweden
- Died: September 16, 1912 (aged 30); Edgewater, Coloradol, U.S.
- Military career
- Allegiance: United States
- Branch: United States Navy
- Rank: Petty Officer Third Class
- Unit: USS Leyden (1865)
- Conflicts: Spanish–American War
- Awards: Medal of Honor

Ernest H. Bjorkman (December 18, 1881 – September 16, 1912) was a United States Navy sailor and a recipient of the United States military's highest decoration, the Medal of Honor.

== Biography ==
Bjorkman was born December 18, 1881, in Malmö, Sweden, and after immigrating to the United States joined the Navy. On January 21, 1903, he was serving as an ordinary seaman aboard the USS Leyden when it was returning from Puerto Rico and it foundered near Block Island in a heavy fog. For his actions during the wreck he received the Medal of Honor December 26, 1903.

He died on September 16, 1912.

== Medal of Honor citation ==
Rank and organization: Ordinary Seaman, U.S. Navy. Born: 25 April 1881, Malmo, Sweden. Accredited to: New York. G.O. No.: 145, 26 December 1903.

Citation:

On board the U.S.S. Leyden, 21 January 1903, Bjorkman displayed heroism at the time of the wreck of that vessel.

== See also ==
- List of Medal of Honor recipients in non-combat incidents
