= USS Annapolis (PG-10) =

Gunboat of the United States Navy

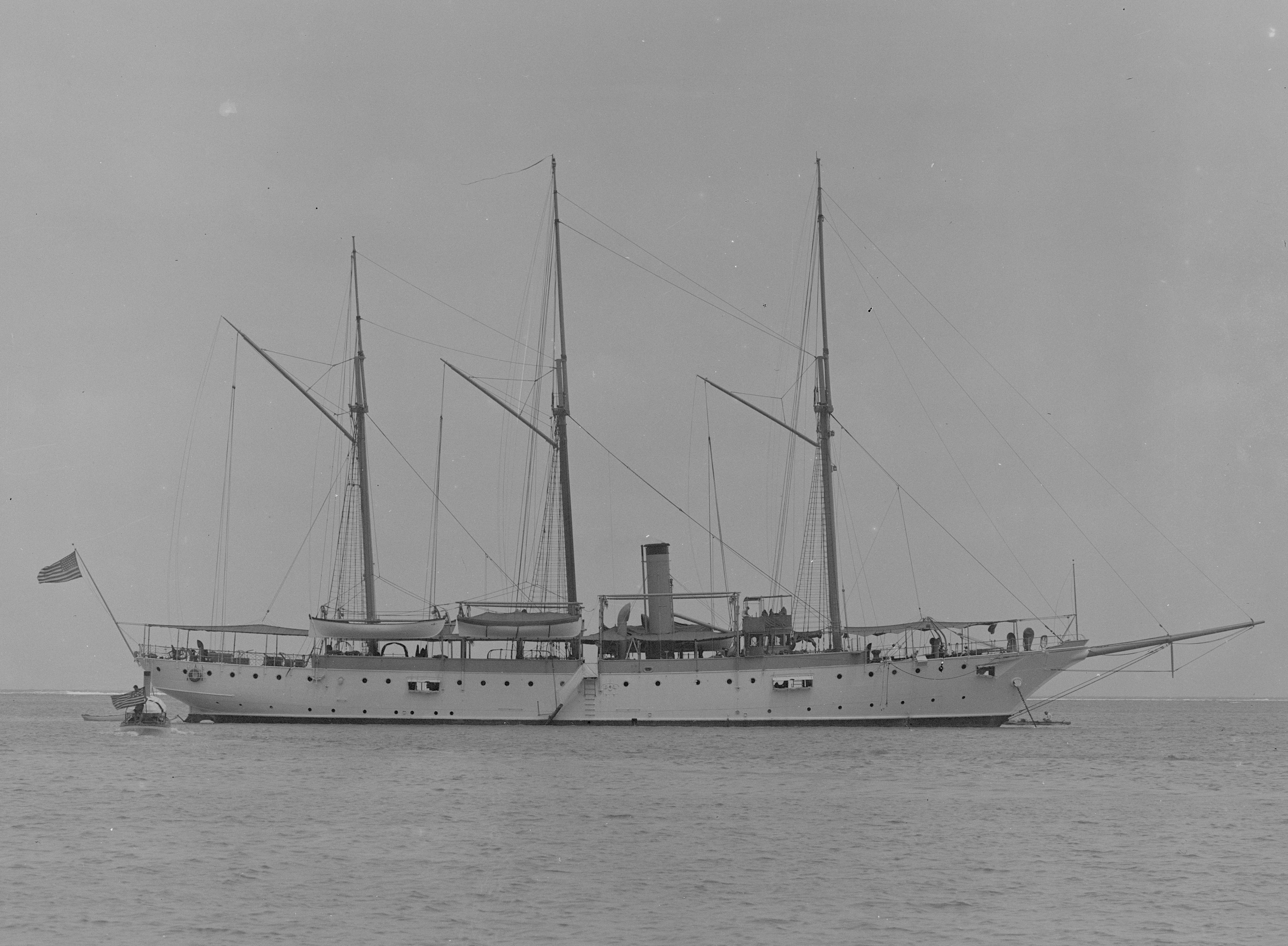
- USS Annapolis at Tahiti in 1907, photographed by Henry Winkelmann

History

United States
- Name: USS Annapolis
- Namesake: Annapolis, Maryland
- Builder: Lewis Nixon, Elizabethport, New Jersey
- Cost: $277,204 (hull and machinery)
- Laid down: 18 April 1896
- Launched: 23 December 1896
- Commissioned: 20 July 1897
- Decommissioned: 1 July 1919
- Reclassified: PG-10, 17 July 1920; IX-1, 1 July 1921
- Stricken: 30 June 1940
- Fate: School ship, 1920–1940

General characteristics
- Type: Gunboat
- Displacement: 1,153 long tons (1,172 t)
- Length: 203 ft 6 in (62.03 m)
- Beam: 36 ft (11 m)
- Draft: 12 ft 9 in (3.89 m)
- Propulsion: Screw steamer
- Speed: 13.17 kn (15.16 mph; 24.39 km/h)
- Complement: 133 officers and enlisted
- Armament: 6 × 4 in (100 mm) guns; 4 × 6-pounder (57 mm (2.24 in)) guns

Service record
- Operations: Spanish–American War; Philippine–American War

The first USS Annapolis (PG-10/IX-1) was a gunboat in the United States Navy. She was named for Annapolis, Maryland.

Annapolis was laid down on 18 April 1896 at Elizabethport, New Jersey, by Lewis Nixon and his shipyard superintendent, Arthur Leopold Busch; launched on 23 December 1896; sponsored by Ms. Georgia Porter, the daughter of Captain Theodoris Porter; and commissioned at New York on 20 July 1897, Commander John J. Hunker in command.

== Service history ==
=== Spanish–American War ===
Following commissioning, the gunboat operated along the east coast and in the Caribbean Sea engaged in training missions. In March 1898, she was assigned to the North Atlantic Fleet. By April, the U.S. was on the verge of war with Spain over conditions in Cuba. On 18 April, the warship departed New York on her way to the Florida coast. She arrived at Key West on the 25th, the day on which President William McKinley signed a joint resolution of Congress that formalized the fact that a state of war had existed between the U.S. and Spain since the 21st. She made a round-trip voyage from Key West to Port Tampa and back before joining the blockade off Havana on 2 May. She remained there for 19 days. On 8 May, she assisted Mayflower in capturing the Spanish sailing vessel Santiago Apostol, bound from Yucatan to Havana with a cargo of fish.

The remainder of that tour passed more or less routinely, and Annapolis retired from Cuban waters on 21 May. She spent eight days at Key West and two weeks at Port Tampa before rejoining the blockade at Daiquiri on 22 June. The following day, the gunboat moved to Guantánamo Bay. On 29 June, while she was on station at Guantánamo Bay with the torpedo boat Ericsson and cruiser Marblehead, Annapolis she assisted those ships in the capture of the British steamer Adula. On 13 July, she left the Guantánamo Bay area to make a reconnaissance visit to Baracoa on Cuba's northeastern coast. While at Baracoa on the 15th, she conferred with a group of friendly Cubans and engaged in a brief gun duel with an enemy shore battery near the eastern end of the town. She departed Baracoa that same day and resumed duty at Guantánamo Bay on the 16th.

On the 18th, she received orders to help capture Nipe Bay located about 90 mi (140 km) up the northeastern coast from Baracoa. Following Wasp, Leyden, and Topeka into the bay on the 21st, Annapolis successfully passed through a known minefield. Inside, the four American ships discovered the Jorge Juan lying at anchor inside the bay. After a brisk exchange of fire, the Americans bested the Spanish warship in the resulting Battle of Nipe Bay, and she began to sink. Annapolis and the three other ships set about the tasks of completing the capture of the Nipe Bay littoral and removing the mines from the bay itself. The gunboat departed Nipe Bay on 22 July and set a course for Puerto Rico where she assisted the Army in the capture of the city of Ponce on the 30th. For the remainder of the war, she served at Puerto Rico, making one voyage from that island to St. Thomas in the Danish West Indies at the end of the first week in August just before the armistice of 12 August.

=== Post-war deployment ===
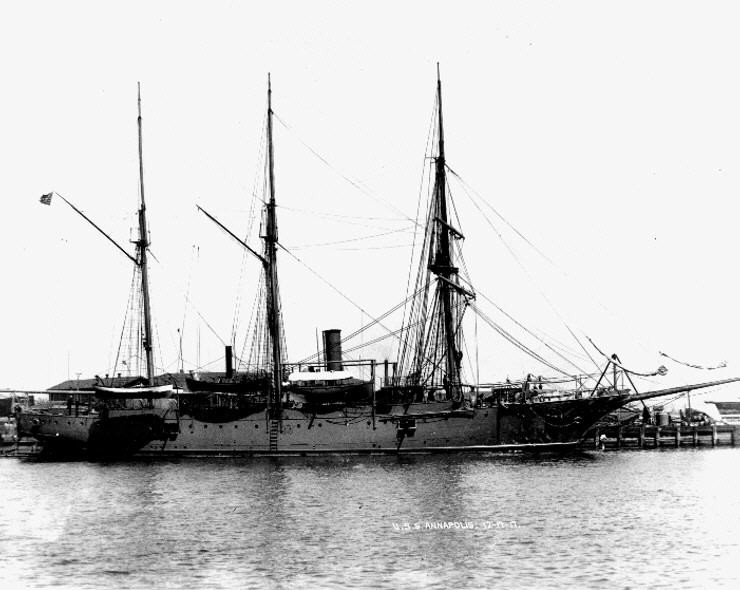
The Annapolis circa 1898

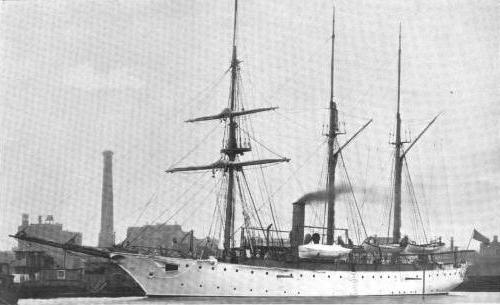
The Annapolis, photographed by William H. Rau, circa 1898

On 24 August, she departed Puerto Rico and proceeded—via Key West—to the New England coast where she visited Newport, Rhode Island; Portsmouth, New Hampshire; and New York City. Late in October, the gunboat headed back to the West Indies where she cruised for the next six months. Annapolis returned to the New England coast late in April 1899 and operated along the eastern seaboard for the next four months. On 5 September, she was placed out of commission at Norfolk, Virginia.

She was recommissioned on 14 November 1900, Lieutenant Commander Karl Rohrer in command. At the end of December 1900, she departed Hampton Roads, bound for the Far East. Steaming via the Atlantic Ocean, the Mediterranean Sea, the Suez Canal, and the Indian Ocean, the warship arrived at Cavite in the Philippines on 24 April 1901. She remained in the Far East for the next three years. For the most part, the Philippine Islands constituted her sphere of operations. She conducted patrols, carried passengers and mail among the islands, and supported the Army during the first stage of the Philippine–American War. She also participated extensively in the hydrographic surveys made of the islands.

In the summer and fall of 1903, she joined American's Far Eastern fleet for a cruise to Chinese and Japanese waters. During that voyage, she visited Chefoo and Shanghai in China, Kobe and Yokohama in Japan and Tamsui on the island of Formosa before returning to Cavite on 19 November.

The gunboat operated in the Philippines for the next three months, but late in February 1904, she returned to Shanghai for a month. After a week of target practice in Chinese waters from 30 March-8 May, Annapolis headed back to the Philippines, arriving in Cavite on 13 May. However, her stay was brief because she departed Cavite again on 2 June and shaped a course via Yokohama back to the U.S.

Annapolis reached Mare Island, California, later that summer, was decommissioned, and entered the navy yard there for extensive repairs. She was placed back in commission on 25 March 1907, Lt. Cdr. Lewis J. Clark in command, and departed San Francisco, California, on 5 April bound—via Hawaii—for American Samoa. The gunboat arrived at Tutuila, Samoa on 22 May and began duty as station ship. She discharged those duties until 9 September 1911, when she departed Pago Pago to return home. The warship made a stop at Honolulu on the way back, arrived at San Francisco on 9 October, and entered the Mare Island Navy Yard later that day. The gunboat was decommissioned once more on 16 December 1911.

Annapolis remained at Mare Island until recommissioned on 1 May 1912, Cdr. Warren J. Terhune in command. Sometime in May, the warship moved south to San Diego, California, whence she departed the 21st and headed for the coast of Central America. She arrived at Corinto—off the coast of Nicaragua—on 13 June. Conditions in that Central American republic had been unstable throughout the 1900s but, after 1910, became increasingly worse as three factions vied with each other for power. By the summer of 1912, General Manuel Estrada Cabrera—more or less democratically elected under American auspices—had been forced put of office. His vice president—Adolfo Diaz—took over his duties; but, by the end of July, full-scale civil war raged in Nicaragua. Annapolis returned to the Corinto area on 1 August following a six-week cruise along the coasts of Honduras, El Salvador and Guatemala. The gunboat remained at Corinto for the following four months, periodically sending landing parties ashore to protect Americans lives and property and to restore order in areas where Americans were located. On 9 December, she departed Nicaraguan waters to return to San Francisco where, after stops at Acajutla, El Salvador, and at San Diego, she arrived on 30 December. That same day, the warship entered the Mare Island Navy Yard for repairs.

She completed repairs late in January 1913 and returned to sea on the 20th. The gunboat made a 16-day stop at San Diego before resuming her voyage to Central American waters on 7 February. Annapolis arrived at Amapala, Honduras on 17 February and remained there until 9 March. After a short cruise to the Gulf of Fonseca and to Petosi in Nicaragua on 9–10 March, she returned to Amapala on the 10th and remained there until 23 April.

=== Service in Mexico ===
At that time, she departed the Honduran coast and headed for Mexico where successive coups had unseated first Porfirio Díaz and then his successor Francisco Madero. Gen. Victoriano Huerta seized the reins of government, but others—notably Venustiano Carranza, Emiliano Zapata, Álvaro Obregón, and Francisco "Pancho" Villa—contested his usurpation of power and generally added to the mayhem in Mexico. For the next six years, Annapolis patrolled the Mexican coast investigating conditions, protecting American interests, and assisting American refugees. She spent most of her time along the Mexican coast but returned periodically to California for repairs, provisions, and training.

At 1915 on 21 September, while exercising off the Imperial fortress colony of Bermuda (where she was based at the Royal Naval Dockyard), the Royal Navy cruiser HMS Orion was ordered, in response to a request from the United States Consul for assistance, to make its way towards the position of Annapolis, four hundred miles from Bermuda at 35 degrees North and 54 degrees West. Cadet Robert Hugh Quinn, aboard Annapolis, required an immediate operation for appendicitis and the 7 knot speed of Annapolis would not enable her to reach Bermuda in time. The two ships were in sight of each other by 0858 on 22 September. After Captain Hines of the Annapolis went aboard Orion to meet with its captain, HRG Kinahan, Orion set off for Bermuda by 1038 with the American cadet, entering through the Narrows channel at night and arriving at the dockyard at 0246 on 23 September, from where Quinn was delivered to the Royal Naval Hospital.

=== World War I ===
Following the entry of the United States into World War I, in June 1918, she moved through the Panama Canal to begin duty out of New Orleans, Louisiana, with the American Patrol. She cruised the waters of the Gulf of Mexico until 25 April 1919, at which time she was detached from the American Patrol. She departed New Orleans early in May and arrived in San Diego later that month. On 1 July, Annapolis was placed out of commission at the Mare Island Navy Yard.

=== Later years ===
Early in 1920, the gunboat was towed to Philadelphia, Pennsylvania, where she was turned over to the Pennsylvania Nautical School on 1 April 1920. She served as a school ship, on a loan basis, for the next 20 years.

On 17 July 1920, when the Navy adopted its alphanumeric system of classification, Annapolis was designated PG-10. On 1 July 1921 she was reclassified as an "unclassified miscellaneous auxiliary" and assigned the hull number IX-1.

== Fate ==
On 30 June 1940, her name was struck from the Naval Vessel Register, and she was turned over to the United States Maritime Commission for disposal. On 15 May 1941 she was commissioned in the U.S. Coast Guard and served as a station ship in New London, Connecticut. On 31 August 1942 she was returned to the Maritime Commission and was scrapped.

She was one of the few ships to see service during the Spanish-American War, World War I and World War II.

== Awards ==
- Sampson Medal
- Spanish Campaign Medal
- Philippine Campaign Medal
- Mexican Service Medal
- World War I Victory Medal with "ATLANTIC FLEET" clasp
- American Defense Service Medal
- World War II Victory Medal
