= USS Wasp (1893) =

Patrol vessel of the United States Navy

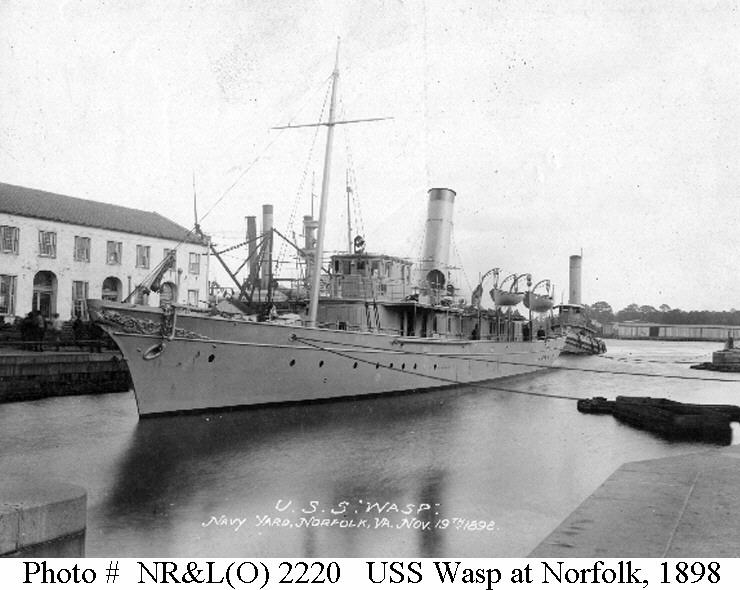
- USS Wasp at the Norfolk Navy Yard at Portsmouth, Virginia, on 19 November 1898.

History

United States
- Name: Columbia; USS Wasp
- Namesake: The wasp, a stinging insect
- Builder: William Cramp & Sons, Philadelphia; Hull built under sub-contract by Charles Hillman Company
- Yard number: 274
- Laid down: 1893
- Launched: 23 August 1893
- Completed: February 1894
- Acquired: 1898
- Commissioned: 11 April 1898
- Decommissioned: 1 December 1919
- Stricken: 13 November 1919
- Identification: Yacht Columbia; official number 127018; signal letters KLVB
- Fate: Sold 20 September 1921

General characteristics
- Type: Armed yacht
- Tonnage: 380 GRT
- Displacement: Yacht 526 cruising, 436 racing; Navy 630 tons
- Length: 202 ft (61.6 m) length overall; 180 ft 0 in (54.86 m) on load waterline
- Beam: 23 ft 0 in (7.01 m)
- Draft: Yacht 10 ft 9 in (3.3 m); Navy 12 ft 0 in (3.66 m)
- Speed: Yacht 17.85 knots (20.54 mph; 33.06 km/h) mean trials; Navy 16.5 knots
- Complement: 55 officers and enlisted men
- Armament: 4 × 6-pounder guns; 2 × Colt machine guns

The seventh USS Wasp was the former yacht Columbia, purchased by the U.S. Navy and converted to an armed yacht serving from 1898 to 1919, with service in the Spanish–American War and World War I.

== Yacht Columbia ==
Columbia was built in 1893 by William Cramp & Sons for Joseph Harvey Ladew, Sr. of New-York. The hull, built under sub-contract by the Charles Hillman Company, was launched from Philadelphia on 23 August 1893. (Note: Dictionary of American Naval Fighting Ships erroneously has "built in 1898" the same year as commissioning. This causes confusion with the Ladew yacht Columbia built as a replacement in 1899 at the Crescent Shipyard, Elizabeth, New Jersey. That Columbia became HMCS Stadacona.) The yacht was completed February 1894 as Cramp hull number 274 and on registration assigned the official number 127018 and the signal letters KLVB.

As built characteristics were 202 ft (61.6 m) length overall, 180 ft (54.9 m) length on load waterline, beam of 23 ft (7.0 m) and a cruising draft of 10 ft 9 in (3.3 m). Ladew had wanted to own the "fastest pleasure vessel afloat" so the yacht had both cruising and racing specifications. The cruising draft was at a displacement of 526 tons, but a racing draft of 9 ft 6 in (2.9 m) would be at 436 tons displacement. Steam was from two single ended boilers 11 ft 5 in (3.5 m) long with a 12 ft 2 in (3.7 m) diameter driving a four-cylinder triple expansion engine that at forced draught developed 1,900 indicated horsepower. On leaving the yard on completion the yacht made a trial run on the New York Yacht Club course from Larchmont, on Long Island Sound, to New London, Connecticut making a mean speed of 17.85 knots (20.54 mph; 33.06 km/h) and 18.35 knots (21.12 mph; 33.98 km/h) over a deep water segment of the course where drag was minimized. Registered tonnage was 380 GRT and 190 net tons.

== Navy Acquisition and commissioning ==
Columbia was purchased by the United States Navy for $95,000, renamed USS Wasp, and commissioned at New York City on 11 April 1898.

=== Spanish–American War service ===
The converted yacht departed New York on 26 April 1898, Lieutenant Aaron Ward in command, and headed south for Spanish–American War duty blockading Cuba. She stopped at Key West, Florida, from 1 to 7 May 1898 and arrived off Havana later on 7 May. From there, she moved west along the northern coast to Bahia Honda, also arriving there on 7 May. On 12 May 1898, while cruising on blockade station off the Cuban coast between Havana and Bahia Honda, Wasp joined a small convoy escorted by the revenue cutter USRC Manning and made up of merchantman SS Gussie and tugs Triton and Dewey. Gussie carried two companies of United States Army troops scheduled to land at Bahia Honda, while Triton and Dewey carried representatives of the press.

Just before 1500 that afternoon, some of the soldiers from Gussie went ashore near Cabañas, purportedly the first American troops to land on Cuban soil. They formed a skirmish line and started their advance through dense underbrush. At about 1515, Spanish Army forces counterattacked the American troops and opened fire on the ships in the bay. Wasp returned fire with her portside six-pounders, carefully avoiding the area occupied by friendly forces. At that point, she received word that the 100 or so soldiers fighting ashore were heavily outnumbered and outflanked to the west. The only course of action open to them was to disengage the enemy and reembark in Gussie. During that operation, Wasp joined Manning and recently arrived unarmored cruiser Dolphin in providing covering gunfire for the evacuation. When another landing, scheduled for the following day, did not occur, Wasp lobbed a few shells at an adobe watch-tower from which Spanish riflemen had taken the ships under fire, and then she resumed her patrol station off the coast.

On 15 May 1898, the converted yacht departed the Cuban coast to return to Florida. She arrived at Key West that same day and remained in the Florida Keys, either at Key West or Sand Key, almost until the end of May 1898. Wasp returned to the blockade, at Cienfuegos, briefly on 29 May 1898 but was back at Key West on 31 May 1898. During June 1898, the yacht moved from blockade station to blockade station, returning periodically to the Florida Keys for necessities. From 9 June 1898 to 11 June 1898, she stood off Havana. After a three-day return to Key West, Wasp took station off the southeastern coast of Cuba on 20 June 1898, patrolling between Santiago de Cuba and Guantánamo Bay.

At the beginning of July 1898, she paid a five-day visit to Key West, returning to the Santiago de Cuba area again on 10 July 1898. On 19 July 1898, the converted yacht cleared Guantanamo Bay for Nipe Bay on Cuba's northeastern coast. She arrived at Nipe Bay late on the morning of 21 July 1898 and, on orders to reconnoiter the bay in company with armed tugboat USS Leyden, started in toward Port Nipe. Upon entering, Wasp sighted a Spanish warship at anchor some four miles up the bay. She fired several shots at the signal station located at the entrance, then sped forward to engage the enemy ship. At 1244, the Spanish ship opened fire at extreme range, and Wasp returned fire immediately. Leyden, followed by gunboats USS Annapolis and USS Topeka, quickly joined in. As the range decreased, American gunfire became more accurate, and all four ships began scoring telling hits on the enemy. Finally, at 1312, the Spaniard's colors disappeared. Wasp and her three colleagues ceased fire and watched their quarry, the sloop Jorge Juan, sink at 1342. After making a complete reconnaissance of the southern and western portions of the bay, Wasp anchored there for the night.

On 23 July 1898, Wasp departed Cuba, bound for Puerto Rico, and arrived off Fajardo that same day. For the next seven weeks, she cruised the coasts of Puerto Rico in company with auxiliary cruiser USS Dixie, Annapolis, and gunboat USS Gloucester. Throughout the entire period, only one noteworthy event occurred. On 27 July 1898, the four ships encountered three Spanish brigantines at Ponce but evaluated them as too insignificant even to take as prizes.

On 8 September 1898, Wasp departed San Juan to return to the United States. After a five-day stop at Charleston, South Carolina, she continued her voyage north on 18 September 1898 and entered the Norfolk Navy Yard at Norfolk, Virginia, on 21 September 1898. On 27 September 1898, she was decommissioned there and laid up.

=== Peacetime service ===
On 15 December 1898, the yacht was loaned to the Florida Naval Militia for training purposes. That tour of duty lasted until 21 June 1899, at which time she was returned to the U.S. Navy. She resumed her retirement to serve as station ship at Port Royal, South Carolina. In July 1902, she returned to Norfolk to be decommissioned once again on 23 July 1902.

On 2 October 1902, Wasp went into commission again and received orders to the 8th Naval District. During her service there as a district tender, she made infrequent cruises in the Gulf of Mexico and the West Indies. In 1906, she moved from the Gulf of Mexico to Newport, Rhode Island, for a tour of duty at the Torpedo Station. In 1907, she visited East Coast, Gulf Coast, and Mississippi River ports of the United States during a cruise to spur enlistments in the U.S. Navy. In 1908, Wasp began a nine-year assignment, again training naval militiamen, this time on loan to the New York Naval Militia. Navy records show armament at the time of World War I service as two three pounder and two one pounder guns.

=== World War I Service ===
That duty ended early in 1917, as the United States moved closer to war. On 7 April 1917, the day after the American declaration of war on the German Empire that brought the United States into World War I, Wasp began patrolling the coast of Long Island. Throughout the first year of the war, the yacht cruised the coastal waters of the 3d Naval District as a unit of, and later as flagship for, Squadron 8, Patrol Force. In April 1918, Wasp received orders detaching her from the 3d Naval District and assigning her to duty at Annapolis, Maryland. She arrived in Annapolis on 9 May 1918 and, but for periodic runs to Norfolk, remained there for the remainder of her naval career.

=== Disposal ===
Struck from the Navy List on 13 November 1919, Wasp was formally decommissioned at Norfolk on 1 December 1919. On 20 September 1921, she was sold to Halsted P. Layton of Georgetown, Delaware.

== Bibliography ==
- Chesneau, Roger, and Eugene M. Kolesnik, Eds. Conway's All The World's Fighting Ships 1860–1905. New York City: Mayflower Books Inc., 1979. ISBN 0-8317-0302-4.
- Eger, Christopher L. (March 2021). "Hudson Fulton Celebration, Part II". Warship International. LVIII (1): 58–81. ISSN 0043-0374.
