= Michael Walsh (Medal of Honor) =

United States Navy Medal of Honor recipient (1858–1913)

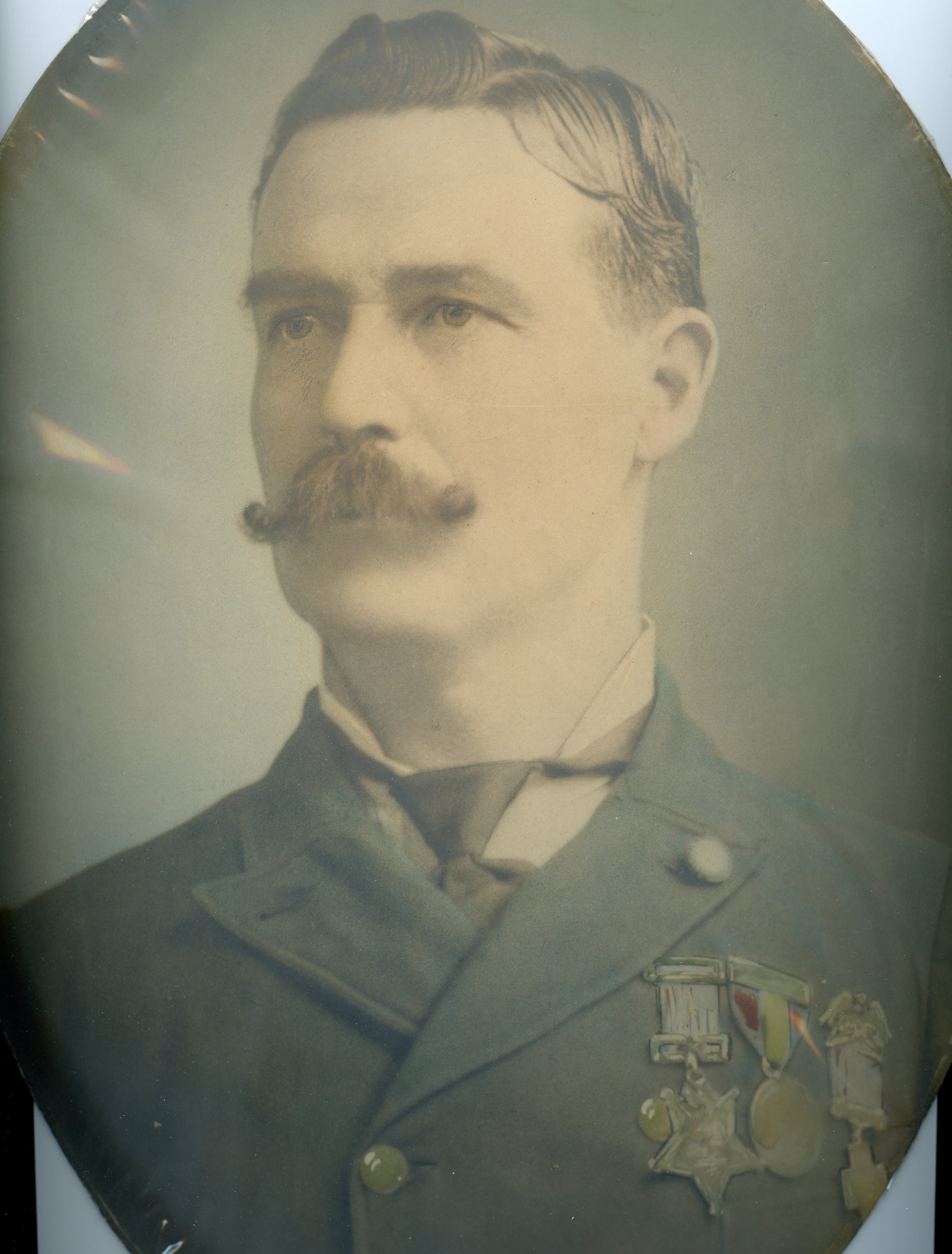
- Born: July 27, 1858; Newport, Rhode Island, US
- Died: June 29, 1913 (aged 54)
- Military career
- Allegiance: United States
- Branch: United States Navy
- Rank: Chief Machinist
- Unit: USS Leyden
- Awards: Medal of Honor

Michael Walsh (July 27, 1858 – June 29, 1913) was a chief machinist serving in the United States Navy who received the Medal of Honor for bravery.

== Biography ==
Walsh was born July 27, 1858, in Swansea, Wales. He arrived in New York aboard the ship Jeremiah Thompson on May 28, 1864.

After joining the U.S. Navy he was stationed aboard the USS Leyden as a chief machinist. On January 21, 1903, the Leyden was wrecked. For his actions during the incident received the Medal of Honor on December 26, 1903.

Walsh received the Medal of Honor (MOH) for heroism on a little vessel that became celebrated for the valuable service performed and the many fights and incidents in which it was present - the tugboat USS Leyden, a vessel of only 500 tons.

The tug was stationed at Key West, Florida, and, on April 22, 1898, delivered to Admiral William T. Sampson on board the armored cruiser USS New York, the information that war was declared, and that he should proceed, with the fleet, to Cuba. The following morning, the fleet sailed with the Leyden following the New York.

After reaching Cuba, the Leyden was sent back to Key West and was outfitted with guns. Upon return to Cuba, the Leyden was used as one of the blockading squadrons on the Cuban coast. Leyden participated in many fights and captured several prizes. At the close of the war, Leyden was sent back to Newport, Rhode Island for repairs.

Walsh received the Medal of Honor for a heroic deed by which the lives of the crew were saved. The little vessel that had passed through so many dangers during the Spanish War, and had so many fights, fell a victim to the wind, being wrecked January 21, 1903 on the rocks of Block Island, Rhode Island.

During the storm and wreck, Walsh, instead of seeking his own safety, thought of only duty, and in the engine room closing the valves, releasing the main injecting valve, releasing the safety valve on the main boiler, he thus prevented an explosion. The life boats were all sunk by the heavy seas and the lives of the crew saved by being pulled ashore in a breeches buoy.

Walsh was a member of the United Spanish War Veterans.

Walsh died on June 29, 1913.

== Medal of Honor citation ==
Rank and organization: Chief Machinist, U.S. Navy. Born: 27 July 1858, Newport, R.I. Accredited to: Rhode Island. G.O. No.: 145, 26 December 1903.

Citation:

Serving on board the U.S.S. Leyden; for heroism at the time of the wreck of that vessel, 21 January 1903.

== See also ==
- List of Medal of Honor recipients during peacetime
