= Michael Thornton (Medal of Honor, awarded 1884) =

Irish-American naval seaman, Medal of Honor recipient (born 1856)

- Born: 1856; Ireland
- Died: Unknown
- Military career
- Allegiance: United States of America
- Branch: United States Navy
- Rank: Lieutenant
- Unit: USS Leyden
- Awards: Medal of Honor

Michael Thornton (1856–unknon) was a United States Navy sailor and a recipient of the United States military's highest decoration, the Medal of Honor.

Born in 1856 in Ireland, Thornton immigrated to the United States and joined the Navy from Pennsylvania. By August 26, 1881, he was serving as a seaman on the tugboat USS Leyden. On that day, while Leyden was near Boston, Massachusetts, Landsman Michael Drennan jumped overboard because he was "temporarily insane". Thornton jumped in after him and kept him afloat until they could be rescued. For this action, he was awarded the Medal of Honor three years later, on October 18, 1884.

Thornton's official Medal of Honor citation reads:

For jumping overboard from the U.S. Tug Leyden, near Boston, Mass., 26 August 1881, and sustaining until picked up, Michael Drennan, landsman, who had jumped overboard while temporarily insane.

== See also ==
- List of Medal of Honor recipients during peacetime
