= USS Leyden (1865) =

Tugboat of the United States Navy

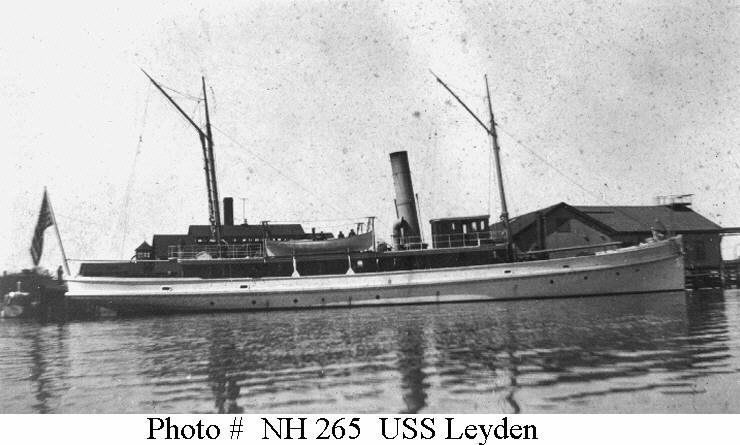
- USS Leyden

History

United States
- Name: USS Leyden
- Namesake: Original merchant ship name retained after acquisition by U.S. Navy
- Builder: James Tetlow, Chelsea, Massachusetts
- Launched: 1865
- Fate: Foundered near Block Island on 21 January 1903

General characteristics
- Type: Armed tug
- Displacement: 35 tons
- Armament: 2 guns

The first USS Leyden was a screw steamer that operated as a tug in the U.S. Navy from 1866 to 1903 and saw combat service in the Spanish–American War in 1898.

== History ==
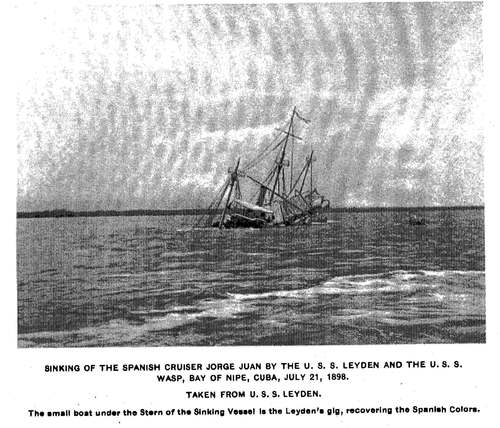
The small boat under the stern of the sinking Jorge Juan is Leyden's gig, recovering the Spanish colours

Leyden was launched in 1865 by James Tetlow, Chelsea, Massachusetts. From 1866 to 1879 she operated as a yard tug at the Boston Navy Yard, performing various harbor duties out of Boston, Massachusetts, until reassigned to Portsmouth, New Hampshire, in 1879. Leyden served there until 1897, when she was assigned to Newport, Rhode Island. While the ship was near Boston on 26 August 1881, Seaman Michael Thornton jumped overboard and rescued a fellow sailor from drowning, for which he was awarded the Medal of Honor.

In 1898, Leyden performed towing operations off Cuba during the Spanish–American War. On 21 July 1898, her captain, Ensign Walter S. Crosley, using her one-pound guns, joined armed yacht USS Wasp, and gunboats USS Annapolis and USS Topeka in firing on and sinking the Spanish sloop Jorge Juan in Nipe Bay, Cuba, in the Battle of Nipe Bay. She also fought at the Battle of Fajardo the night of 8–9 August, bombarding enemy positions to support bluejackets from USS Amphitrite holding the Cape San Juan Light against a Spanish ground attack. The next morning, Leyden transported 60 women and children from the town of Fajardo that had been quartered at the lighthouse to Ponce, Puerto Rico.

From 1898 to 1903, Leyden alternated her services between the Caribbean and Newport, Rhode Island. While on a return passage from Puerto Rico on 21 January 1903, the tug foundered in heavy fog off Block Island, ending her lengthy career. Ordinary Seaman Ernest H. Bjorkman, Fireman First Class Loddie Stupka, Quartermaster Third Class August P. Teytand, and Chief Machinist Michael Walsh received the Medal of Honor "for heroism at the time of the wreck of that vessel".

== Awards ==
- Sampson Medal
- Spanish Campaign Medal
