= William Lowell Hill =

US Navy sailor and Medal of Honor recipient (1855–1922)

- Born: October 17, 1855; Auburn, Iowa, US
- Died: August 17, 1922 (aged 66) Kittery, Maine, US
- Allegiance: United States
- Branch: United States Navy
- Service years: 1873 - 1919
- Rank: Lieutenant
- Commands: USS Southery (IX-26), USS Topeka (PG-35)
- Conflicts: Spanish–American War • Battle of Santiago de Cuba
- Awards: Medal of Honor

William Lowell Hill (October 17, 1855 – August 2, 1922) was a United States Navy officer and a recipient of the United States military's highest decoration, the Medal of Honor. He was awarded the medal as an enlisted sailor for rescuing a drowning shipmate in 1881. Hill went on to serve in the Spanish–American War and reached the warrant officer rank of chief boatswain. His lifelong Navy career finished with his command of two prison ships at Portsmouth Naval Shipyard.

== Biography ==
Hill was born on October 17, 1855, in Auburn, Iowa, the son of Henry Clay and Margaret (Cater) Hill. He enlisted in the Navy from New York on November 18, 1873 at the age of 18.

=== Medal of Honor action ===
By June 22, 1881, he was serving as a captain of the top on the training ship USS Minnesota. On that day, while Minnesota was at Newport, Rhode Island, Third Class Boy William Mulcahy fell overboard. Hill jumped into the water and kept the sailor afloat until they were picked up by a launch.

For this action, he was promoted to the warrant officer rank of boatswain on 19 September 1881. He was awarded the Medal of Honor three years later, on October 18, 1884.

Hill's official Medal of Honor citation reads:

Serving on board the U.S. Training Ship Minnesota at Newport, R.I., 22 June 1881, Hill jumped overboard and sustained William Mulcahy, third class boy, who had fallen overboard, until picked up by a steam launch.

=== Later career ===
Hill was then assigned to a series of ships: USS Alaska (1881–1883), USS Galatea (1885–1886), USS Jamestown (1889–1891), USS Brooklyn (CA-3) (1886–1899), and USS Prairie (AD-5) (1901–1904).

In 1892 Hill became a Compatriot of the Empire State Society of the Sons of the American Revolution and was assigned state compatriot number 266 and national compatriot number 4,266.

During the Spanish–American War, he served on Brooklyn at the warrant officer rank of boatswain and received a commendation from Rear Admiral Winfield Scott Schley for his actions at the Battle of Santiago de Cuba. A year later, in 1899, he was commissioned as a chief boatswain. In 1901 he testified before a court of inquiry regarding Admiral Schley's conduct in the war.

In March 1904, Hill was placed in command of the prison ship USS Southery (IX-26) and, in 1905, USS Topeka (PG-35) at the Portsmouth Naval Shipyard in Kittery, Maine. He became known for his prison reform measures, such as discontinuing the use of leg irons, which were adopted at other institutions. He commanded the two ships until he was reassigned to the Portsmouth Navy Yard in September 1917.

During the First World War, Hill was promoted to the temporary rank of lieutenant on July 1, 1918. He was assigned to the Portsmouth Naval Shipyard. He retired from the Navy on October 17, 1919, having reached the mandatory retirement age of 64 and having almost 46 years of continuous service.

=== Death and burial ===
Hill died of a self-inflicted gunshot wound at age 66 on August 2, 1922, at the Portsmouth Naval Shipyard.

== Personal life ==
Hill's first wife was F. Blanche Hedden of Troy, New York, whom he married in 1881. After Blanche's death, he married Katherine Sweetser on February 3, 1917; she had been his first wife's best friend. He was an active freemason while living in Portsmouth, joining a lodge there in 1905.

== Awards ==
- Medal of Honor
- Sampson Medal
- Spanish Campaign Medal
- Victory Medal

== See also ==
- List of Medal of Honor recipients during peacetime
