= Spanish sloop Jorge Juan =

Spanish Navy sloop of 1877–1898

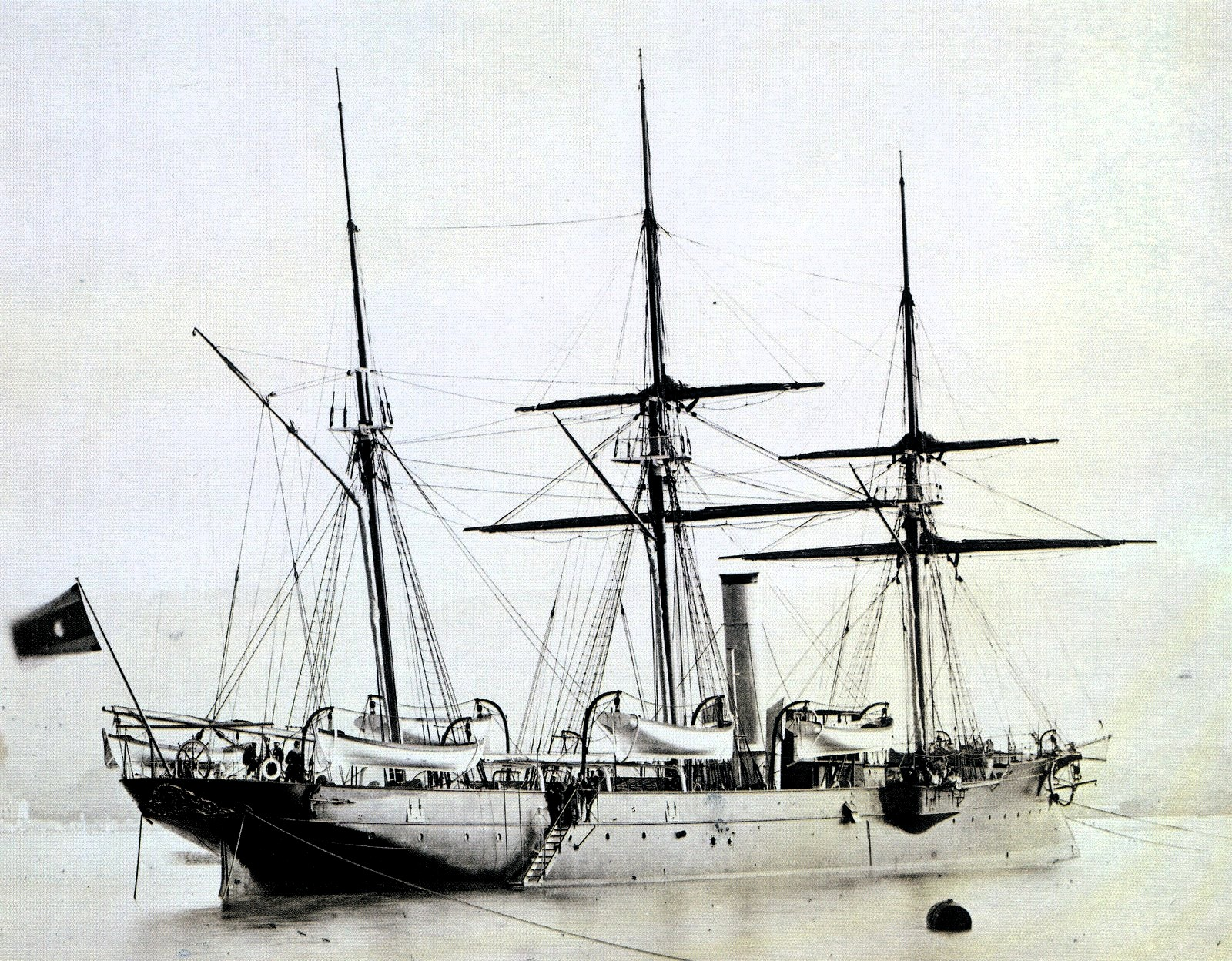

History

Spain
- Name: Jorge Juan
- Namesake: Jorge Juan y Santacilia (1713–1773), Spanish naval officer, mathematician, scientist, astronomer, and engineer
- Builder: Société Nouvelle des Forges et Chantiers de la Méditerranée, La Seyne-sur-Mer, France
- Laid down: 23 December 1875
- Launched: 23 March 1876
- Completed: 1877
- Commissioned: 12 July 1877
- Decommissioned: 18 June 1897
- Motto: Sé valiente y regresarás a casa, a España ("Be Brave, and You Will Go Home to Spain")
- Fate: Hulked 1897; Sunk 21 July 1898

General characteristics
- Class & type: Jorge Juan-class sloop
- Displacement: 920 to 935 tons (see text)
- Length: 63.73 m (209 ft 1 in) overall (see text)
- Beam: 9.05 m (29 ft 8 in) (see text)
- Draft: 4.72 m (15.5 ft) (see text)
- Depth: 5.5 m (18 ft 1 in)
- Installed power: 1,100 ihp (820 kW)
- Propulsion: One steam engine, one shaft, 128 to 480 tons coal (see text)
- Sail plan: Barque-rigged; sail area of 1,125 m^{2} (12,109 sq ft)
- Speed: 11 to 13 knots (20 to 24 km/h; 13 to 15 mph) (see text)
- Range: 1,690 nmi (3,130 km; 1,940 mi) (at economical cruising speed)
- Complement: 146 to 160 (see text)
- Armament: 2 × 160 mm (6.3 in) Parrott guns; 2 × 75 mm (2.95 in) Krupp guns; 1 × 80 mm (3.1 in) bronze cannon; 2 × machine guns

Jorge Juan was a Jorge Juan-class sloop of the Spanish Navy commissioned in 1877. She spent her career on colonial service in the Caribbean, seeing action in the Ten Years' War and the Cuban War of Independence. Decommissioned and hulked in 1897, she was sunk off Cuba in 1898 during the Spanish–American War.

Jorge Juan was named for the Spanish naval officer, mathematician, scientist, astronomer, and engineer Jorge Juan y Santacilia (1713–1773), generally regarded as one of the most important scientific figures of the Enlightenment in Spain. As a naval officer, he undertook sensitive diplomatic missions for Spain and contributed to the modernization and professionalization of the Spanish Navy.

== Technical characteristics ==
Jorge Juan had a composite hull, one funnel, three masts, and a barque rig. Sources differ on her dimensions. According to one, she displaced 920 tons, was 63.73 metres (209 ft 1 in) long overall, and had a beam of 9.05 metres (29 ft 8 in) and a draft of 4.72 metres (15 ft 6 in), while Spanish-language sources assert that she displaced 935 tons, was 62 metres (203 ft 5 in) long, and had a beam of 10 metres (32 ft 10 in) and a draft of 4.80 metres (15 ft 9 in). Her depth of hull was 5.55 metres (18 ft 3 in). She had a crew of either 146 or 160.

Jorge Juan had a 1,100-horsepower (820-kilowatt) steam engine driving a single screw. She could carry up to either 128 tons or 480 tons of coal, according to different sources, giving her a range of 1,690 nautical miles (3,130 km; 1,940 mi) at an economical cruising speed. Sources disagree on her maximum speed, stating both that it was 11 knots (20 km/h; 13 mph) and 13 knots (24 km/h; 15 mph). Her sail area was 1,125 square metres (12,109 square feet).

Jorge Juan′s armament consisted of two 160 mm (6.3 in) Parrott rifled muzzle loaders, two 75 mm (2.95 in) Krupp guns, one 80 mm (3.1 in) bronze cannon, and two machine guns.

== Construction and commissioning ==
Jorge Juan was the name ship of a class of two sloops — the Spanish Navy classified them initially as screw avisos, then later reclassified them as "second-class" cruisers" and later still as "third-class cruisers" — built for service in the Third Carlist War (1872–1876) as part of a naval construction plan ordered by Minister of the Navy Rafael Rodríguez de Arias. The Société Nouvelle des Forges et Chantiers de la Méditerranée in La Seyne-sur-Mer, France, constructed both Jorge Juan and her sister ship, Sánchez Barcáiztegui, under the supervision of the Spanish Navy engineer Joaquín Togores. Both ships' keels were laid down on 23 December 1875, both were launched on 23 March 1876, and after fitting out both were delivered to the Spanish Navy and commissioned on 12 July 1877.

== Operational history ==
=== 1877–1897 ===
The Third Carlist War had ended by the time Jorge Juan and Sánchez Barcáiztegui were commissioned. Their design made them suitable for colonial service as gunboats in the Spanish Empire, so they received orders to deploy to the Captaincy General of Cuba, where Spanish forces had been fighting Cuban insurgents in the Ten Years' War since 1868. After her arrival in the Caribbean, Jorge Juan was stationed at the naval base at Santiago de Cuba on the southeast coast of Cuba, and subsequently conducted frequent surveillance and coastal patrol operations to prevent the smuggling of weapons, ammunition, and troops to the insurgents.

On 7 December 1877, the merchant ship SS Moctzeuma arrived at Puerto Plata in the Dominican Republic, where several Cuban insurgents boarded her posing as passengers. After she put back to sea, the insurgents murdered Moctezuma′s captain and several members of the crew who resisted them and commandeered the ship for use as a privateer, intending to attack Spanish shipping in the Caribbean. Jorge Juan, Sánchez Barcáiztegui, and the screw corvette Tornado were among the Spanish warships that set out to hunt down Moctezuma. Jorge Juan found her on 3 January 1878 while patrolling with Tornado off Central America's Mosquito Coast. Before Jorge Juan could capture Moctezuma, Moctezuma's crew scuttled her and escaped to shore in her lifeboats. Twenty of the insurgents were captured ashore and brought aboard Jorge Juan, which transported them to Cienfuegos, Cuba.

In July 1885, Jorge Juan proceeded from Havana, Cuba, to Port-au-Prince, Haiti, to protect Spanish interests and citizens during civil conflict in Haiti.

In the summer of 1892, Jorge Juan arrived at La Guaira, Venezuela, to join an international fleet dedicated to preventing the Legalist Revolution, a civil war in Venezuela, from worsening.

In 1893, replicas of Christopher Columbus's ships — the carrack Santa María and caravels Niña and Pinta — constructed in Spain made a transatlantic voyage on their way to the United States, where they participated in the World's Columbian Exposition, held at Chicago, Illinois, that year. During the voyage, the replica of Santa María arrived at San Juan, Puerto Rico, on 30 March 1893. On 8 April, Jorge Juan got underway from San Juan with the replica of Santa María in tow bound for Havana, where the replicas of Niña and Pinta awaited them.

The Cuban War of Independence broke out in 1895, again pitting Spanish forces in Cuba against insurgents. In March 1896, Jorge Juan got underway from Havana and on 2 May 1896 covered the amphibious landing of Spanish Army troops from Baracoa, Cuba, aboard the torpedo boat Ariete on Toar Beach. On 10 May 1896 she joined the protected cruiser Marqués de la Ensenada and the gunboats Martín Alonso Pinzón and Vasco Núñez de Balboa in carrying out another operation in Baracoa. Several months later, she captured 14 small insurgent vessels in Toco Cove. On 22 August 1896, she supported Spanish troops in Lavite Bay at Mayarí, Cuba.

Jorge Juan was decommissioned on 18 June 1897. She was hulked as a floating jetty, anchored in Nipe Bay on the coast of Cuba.

=== Spanish-American War ===
The Spanish-American War broke out on 25 April 1898 when the United States declared war on Spain, stipulating that the declaration was retroactive to 21 April. During the war, Jorge Juan remained in Nipe Bay, serving as a coal and torpedo depot ship as well as a floating jetty. By July, the United States Navy gunboat USS Topeka — under the command of William S. Cowles, a brother-in-law of Theodore Roosevelt and future rear admiral — had established a blockade of Nipe Bay. The United States became interested in seizing Nipe Bay for use as a base in support of U.S. forces fighting in the Puerto Rico campaign and sent the gunboat USS Annapolis, armed yacht USS Wasp, and armed tug USS Leyden to join Topeka in the waters off Nipe Bay.

The Spanish gunboat Baracoa, another small gunboat, and an armed launch were in Nipe Bay with Jorge Juan late on the morning of 21 July 1898 when Wasp and Leyden entered the bay to reconnoiter it. Wasp immediately sighted Jorge Juan at anchor some 4 to 4.5 nautical miles (7.4 to 8.3 km; 4.6 to 5.2 mi) from the entrance and about 1.25 nautical miles (1.5 mi; 2.3 km) off Mayarí. Wasp and Leyden signaled the sighting to Annapolis and Topeka, which then followed them into the bay.

The Battle of Nipe Bay began when the fort at the entrance to the bay fired several shots at Wasp and Leyden and Topeka returned fire, bombarding the fort and a signal station located with it. Wasp then sped forward to engage Jorge Juan, soon joined by Leyden. At 12:44, with Wasp and Leyden in the northwest part of the bay and northwest of Jorge Juan, Jorge Juan opened fire on them at extreme range, and Wasp returned fire at 12:45. Baracoa came up to join the fight, and Leyden, Annapolis, and Topeka quickly joined in as well. Topeka anchored in the middle of the bay about 4,000 yards (3,700 m) from Jorge Juan, and the other three American warships formed a semicircle around the Spanish ship and began to close the range.

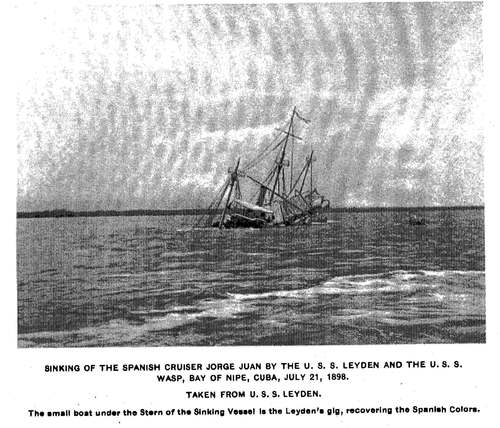
Jorge Juan sinking in Nipe Bay at the end of the Battle of Nipe Bay on 21 July 1898, photographed from the armed tug USS Leyden.

As the range decreased, Jorge Juan's crew opened rifle fire on the Americans. Annapolis closed to 2,000 yards (1,800 m) and maintained a vigorous fire on Jorge Juan. The American gunfire became more accurate as the range closed, and all four American ships began scoring telling hits on Jorge Juan, carrying away her forecastle, foremast, mizzen mast, and flagstaff; Topeka′s 4-inch (102 mm) shells were particularly destructive. Jorge Juan, which became obscured by smoke, apparently managed to fire only four or five rounds during the entire engagement.

Finally, at 13:12 Jorge Juan struck her colors. Her crew abandoned ship and, under heavy fire, took to her boats and reached shore, where they fled into the woods. At 13:15, Leyden signaled that Jorge Juan was sinking — whether because her crew had opened her seacocks to scuttle her or because of the damage inflicted on her by American gunfire was unclear — and the American warships ceased fire. Baracoa withdrew up the Mayarí River , where her crew scuttled her to prevent her capture by the Americans. The American warships then watched Jorge Juan sink by the bow at either 13:42 or 13:45, according to different sources. A dog the Spaniards had left chained on Jorge Juan's deck drowned when it was dragged underwater by the sinking ship.

Boats — one of them commanded by Lieutenant Albert Parker Niblack, a future vice admiral — from the American warships set out for the sinking Jorge Juan, and American sailors collected items from her as trophies. Divers brought up at least a hundred items — such as gunsights, swabs, signal flags, and an item bearing the ship's motto, Sé valiente y regresarás a casa, a España ("Be Brave, and You Will Go Home to Spain") — and these were distributed among the American ships' crews as mementoes of the battle. The Americans discovered four or five cats still alive and clinging to Jorge Juan's wreckage, and also encountered a large number of live rats in the part of her rigging that remained above the surface when she came to rest on the bottom.

== Legacy ==
Jorge Juan's battle ensign was seized as a trophy by a sailor from USS Annapolis. It became part of the United States Navy's trophy flag collection.
