= USS Crosley (APD-87) =

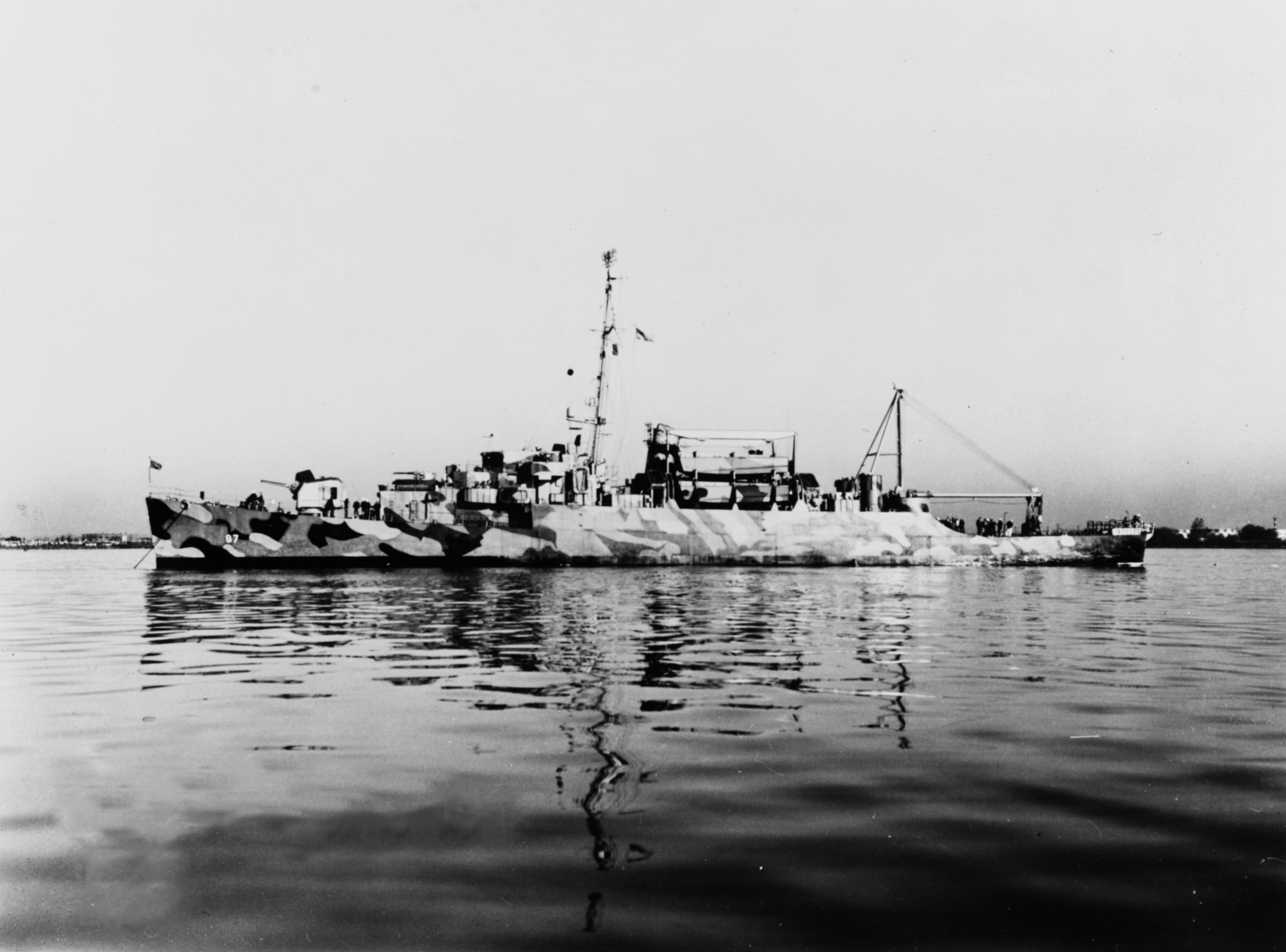

History

United States
- Name: Crosley
- Namesake: Walter S. Crosley
- Operator: United States Navy
- Laid down: 16 October 1943
- Launched: 12 February 1944
- Sponsored by: W. S. Crosley
- Commissioned: 22 October 1944
- Decommissioned: 15 November 1946
- Stricken: 1 June 1960
- Honors and awards: 1 battle star for World War II; China Service Medal; Asiatic–Pacific Campaign Medal; American Campaign Medal; World War II Victory Medal; Navy Occupation Service Medal
- Fate: Sold to Ecuador as a power hulk

General characteristics
- Displacement: 1,400 tons
- Length: 306 ft (93 m)
- Beam: 37 ft (11 m)
- Draft: 12 ft 7 in (4 m)
- Propulsion: 2 × Babcox and Wilcox DR boilers; 2 × GE Turbines, (turbo-electric drive); 2 shafts (12,000 shp)
- Speed: 23.6 knots (27.2 mph; 43.7 km/h)
- Range: 6,000 nmi (11,000 km) at 12 kn (22 km/h)
- Boats & landing craft carried: 4 LCVPs
- Troops: 12 officers; 150 enlisted
- Complement: 12-15 officers; 189-192 enlisted
- Armament: 1 × 5"/38 dual purpose gun mount; 3 × twin 40 mm gun mounts; 6 × single 20 mm gun mounts; 2 × depth charge tracks

USS Crosley (APD-87) was a Crosley-class high speed transport that served in the United States Navy from 1944 to 1946.

== History ==
She was laid down as Rudderow-class destroyer escort Crosley (DE-226) on 16 October 1943 at the Philadelphia Naval Shipyard, and launched on 12 February 1944. She was converted to a Crosley-class high speed transport before her construction was complete, and commissioned on 22 October 1944. During World War II, she was assigned to the Pacific Theater and participated in the Battle of Okinawa. She was decommissioned on 15 November 1946 and laid up in the Atlantic Reserve Fleet at Green Cove Springs, Florida. She was stricken from the Naval Register on 1 June 1960, and transferred to Ecuador as a power hulk.

=== Pacific War ===
Crosley departed from the Norfolk Naval Shipyard on 21 December 1944 for Pearl Harbor, arriving there on 16 January 1945. She trained with Underwater Demolition Teams for the next month before shipping out for San Pedro Bay, Philippines, on 14 February, arriving on 4 March. There she took part of rehearsals for the upcoming invasion of Okinawa. The week before the invasion she served as the mother ship for Underwater Demolition Team 17. Once the invasion began on 1 April, Crosley was tasked with patrolling the coastline. She aided victims of kamikaze attacks on USS Dickerson (APD-21) on 2 April and USS Whitehurst (DE-634) on 12 April. From 20 April 7 June, Crosley escorted convoys between Okinawa and Ulithi, and Okinawa and Leyte.

After the war ended, Crosley transported troops of the 40th Infantry Division from Leyte to Jinsen on 28 August 1945 for the occupation of South Korea. She served as the pilot ship in the harbor of Jinsen until she transported Army soldiers to the port city of Busan. On 3 October, while patrolling off the coast of Busan, Crosley investigated the Anto Maru, a Japanese junk that was sinking, and rescued the surviving 45 Japanese attempting to avoid internment in Korea. Crosley remained in the area transporting soldiers throughout the region until 29 March 1946, when she departed Shanghai for the U.S. West Coast.

=== Decommissioning and fate ===
After overhaul at Philadelphia she arrived at Green Cove Springs, Florida where she was decommissioned and placed in reserve on 15 November 1946. She was stricken in 1960 and transferred to Ecuador as a power hulk.
