= Battle of Nipe Bay =

Coordinates: 20°46′N 75°41′W

- Part of the Spanish–American War
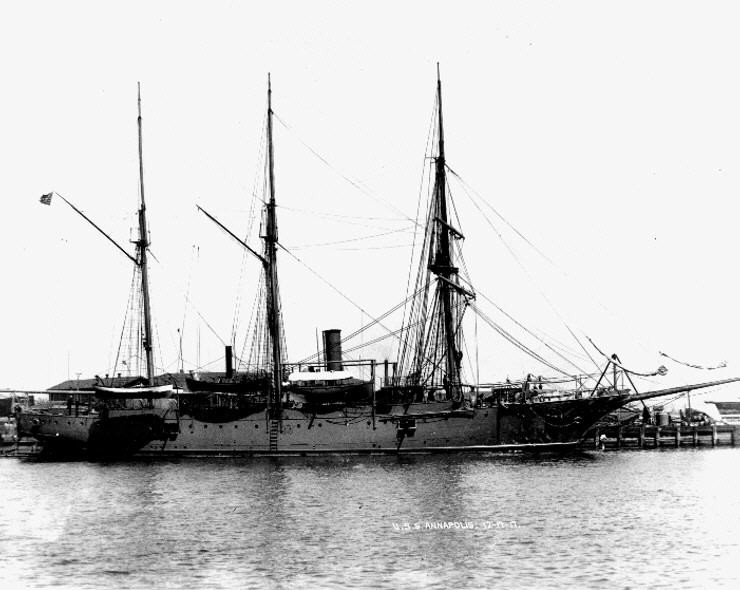
- USS Annapolis circa 1898
Date	July 21, 1898
Location	Nipe Bay, Cuba
Result	American victory

Belligerents
United States	Spain

Commanders and leaders
John J. Hunker	Unknown

Strength
1 auxiliary cruiser 2 gunboats 1 tug	1 sloop 3 gunboats

Casualties and losses
None	1 sloop sunk 1 gunboat scuttled

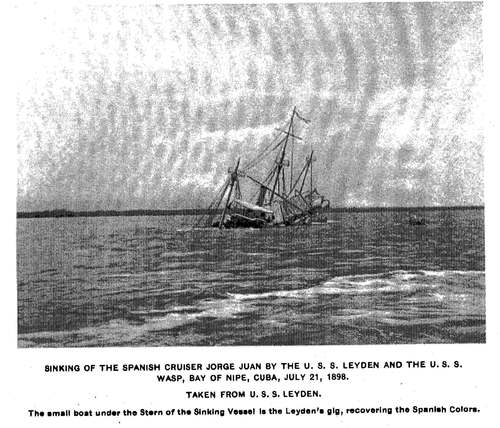
Jorge Juan sinking on 21 July 1898, photographed from USS Leyden.

The Battle of Nipe Bay on July 21, 1898, was an engagement of the Spanish–American War. The battle was fought in Nipe Bay, Cuba, by four United States Navy warships against the Spanish sloop-of-war Jorge Juan and three gunboats which were supported by forts guarding the harbor.

== Battle ==
Nipe Bay had been designated as a rendezvous point for American naval forces delegated to attack Puerto Rico. Upon finding the harbor still occupied by Spanish forces, the American squadron, consisting of the gunboats USS Annapolis and USS Topeka, the armed tug USS Leyden and the armed yacht USS Wasp, maneuvered through a minefield to engage the Spanish forces. Jorge Juan opened fire on Wasp and Leyden, but they quickly sank her with help from Annapolis. While the other three ships were engaging Jorge Juan, Topeka silenced the harbor forts and fired on other Spanish works in the harbor.

== Aftermath ==
Seeing the hopelessness of the situation, the Spanish sailed the small gunboat Baracoa upriver and scuttled her to prevent her capture by the superior American force. Just as the fighting came to an end, U.S. Navy personnel boarded Jorge Juan's sinking hulk, stripping several items from it as trophies. One such trophy was the Jorge Juan's battle-flag, which was taken by one of the sailors from Annapolis and now resides in the United States Navy Trophy Flag Collection. The Americans suffered few, if any, casualties and a few days after the battle the small squadron received orders to depart. The United States later decided that the bay was not necessary for U.S. operations in Puerto Rico, but the battle did cause significant damage to the Spanish Navy and denied the Spanish the use of the port for the remainder of the war.

== Sources ==
- "The Fight in Nipe Harbor" (PDF). New York Times. New York. 24 July 1898.
- "Wasp VII (Armed Yacht) 1898-1919". Dictionary of American Naval Fighting Ships. Naval History and Heritage Command. 3 August 2021.
- Wilson, Herbert Wrigley (1900). The Downfall of Spain: Naval History of the Spanish–American War. London: Richard Clay & Sons, Limited. p. 399.
