= Laddie Stupka =

- Born: March 4, 1878; Cleveland, Ohio, US
- Died: February 20, 1946 (aged 67)
- Burial place: Baltimore National Cemetery Baltimore, Maryland
- Military career
- Allegiance: United States of America
- Branch: United States Navy
- Rank: Fireman First Class
- Unit: USS Leyden (1865)
- Awards: Medal of Honor

Laddie Stupka (March 4, 1878 – February 20, 1946) was a United States Navy sailor and a recipient of the United States military's highest decoration, the Medal of Honor.

== Biography ==
Stupka was born March 4, 1878, in Cleveland, Ohio and joined the Navy from Ohio. On January 21, 1903, the USS Leyden was returning from Puerto Rico when it foundered near Block Island in a heavy fog. For his actions during the wreck he received the Medal of Honor December 26, 1903.

He died on February 20, 1946, and is buried in Baltimore National Cemetery Baltimore, Maryland.

== Medal of Honor citation ==
Rank and organization: Fireman First Class, U.S. Navy. Born: 4 March 1878, Cleveland, Ohio. Accredited to: Ohio. G.O. No.: 145, 26 December 1903.

Citation:

for extraordinary heroism in the line of his profession while serving on board the U.S.S. Leyden, at the time of the wreck of that vessel, 21 January 1903, near Block Island, Rhode Island.

== See also ==
- List of Medal of Honor recipients during peacetime
