= USS Southery =

Collier of the United States Navy

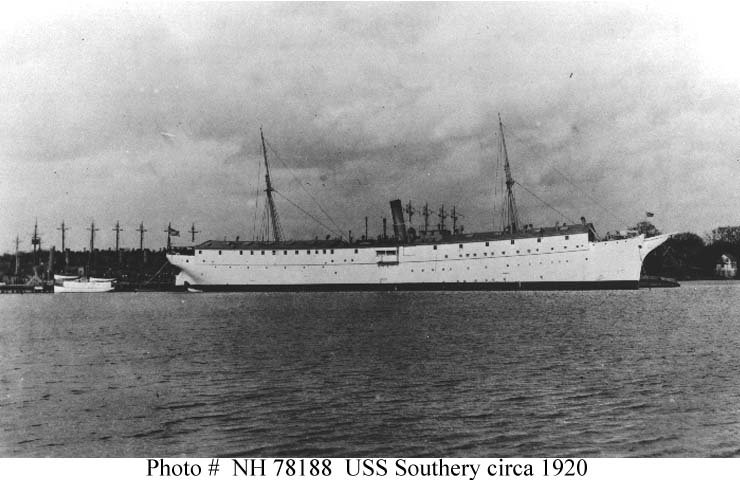

History

United States
- Name: USS Southery
- Builder: R. Thompson Sons & Co., Sunderland, England
- Launched: 1889
- Acquired: by purchase, 16 April 1898
- Commissioned: 2 May 1898
- Decommissioned: 18 February 1899
- Recommissioned: 6 April 1902
- Decommissioned: 12 July 1933
- Stricken: 1 September 1933
- Fate: Sold for scrapping, 1 December 1933

General characteristics
- Type: Collier / Prison ship / Receiving ship
- Displacement: 3,100 long tons (3,100 t) (estimated)
- Length: 288 ft (88 m)
- Beam: 38 ft 10 in (11.84 m)
- Draft: 21 ft 6 in (6.55 m)
- Propulsion: Steam turbine; 1 × screw
- Speed: 10.5 kn (12.1 mph; 19.4 km/h)
- Complement: 59
- Armament: 2 × 3-pounders

USS Southery, a steamer built in 1889 by R. Thompson Sons & Co. at Sunderland, England, was purchased by the United States Navy on 16 April 1898. She was converted to a collier at the Boston Navy Yard and commissioned there on 2 May 1898.

== Service history ==
=== 1898-1916 ===
Southery steamed out of Boston on 6 June and, for the remainder of 1898 and into 1899, she cruised the Atlantic coast from Boston to as far south as Jamaica. On 18 February 1899, the converted collier was placed out of commission at the Norfolk Navy Yard and converted to a prison ship. Southery was moved to Boston on 6 April 1902, where she resumed duty as a prison ship. In early July 1903, the prison ship was shifted to Portsmouth, New Hampshire. In February 1913, she became station ship at Portsmouth. From 1904 to 1917 Southery was commanded by Medal of Honor recipient Chief Boatswain William Lowell Hill.

=== 1917-1933 ===
When the United States entered World War I in the spring of 1917, Southery was still at Portsmouth. On 27 April, the 47 prisoners on board were transferred to the new Portsmouth Naval Prison and she received half of the first draft of recruits from the Great Lakes Naval Training Station and, for five months, trained them intensively. She returned to duty as a prison ship on 25 September 1917 and was so employed until 7 November 1918, when she became receiving ship at the Portsmouth Navy Yard.

On 16 April 1922, Southery moved to the Boston Navy Yard and assumed duty there as receiving ship on the 26th. She continued in the assignment until she decommissioned on 12 July 1933. Her name was struck from the Naval Vessel Register on 1 September, and her hulk was sold to Boston Iron and Metal Co. of Baltimore, Maryland on 1 December.
