= Nipe Bay =

Coordinates: 20°46′N 75°41′W

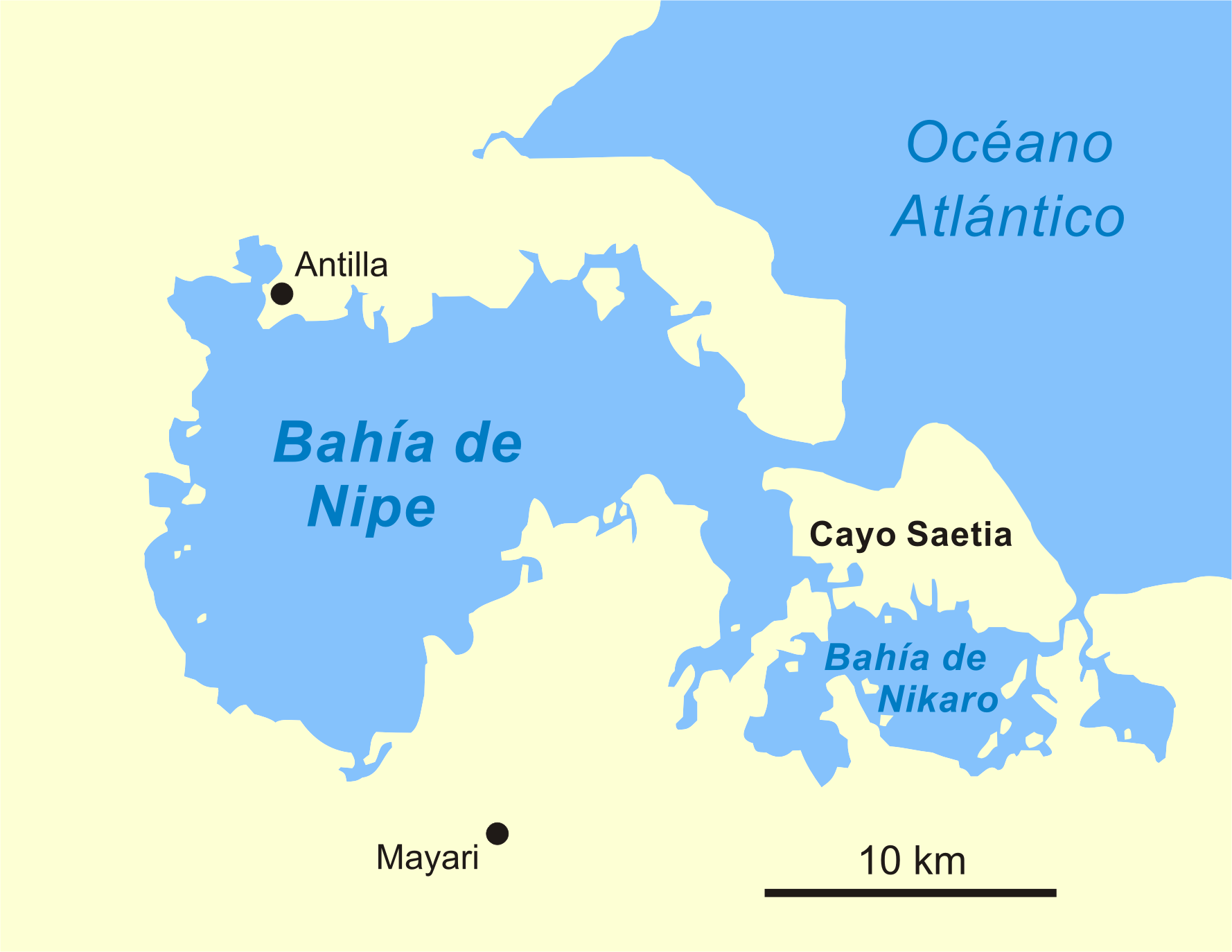
Map of Nipe Bay

Nipe Bay (Spanish: Bahía de Nipe) is a bay on the northern coast of Cuba in Holguín Province, part of the former Oriente Province. It is part of the municipalities of Mayarí and Antilla.

== Overview ==
In Roman Catholic tradition, Nipe Bay is where the statue of Our Lady of Charity, Patroness of Cuba, was discovered miraculously around 1600.

A naval engagement during the Spanish–American War, the Battle of Nipe Bay, took place in the bay on July 21, 1898.

The Cuban leader Fidel Castro was born in Birán, near Nipe Bay, in 1926.

== See also ==
- Guatemala (village)
- Cayo Saetía
- Nipe-Sagua-Baracoa
