= Indian Ocean in World War II =

Naval theatre of operations

Indian Ocean Campaign
- Part of World War II
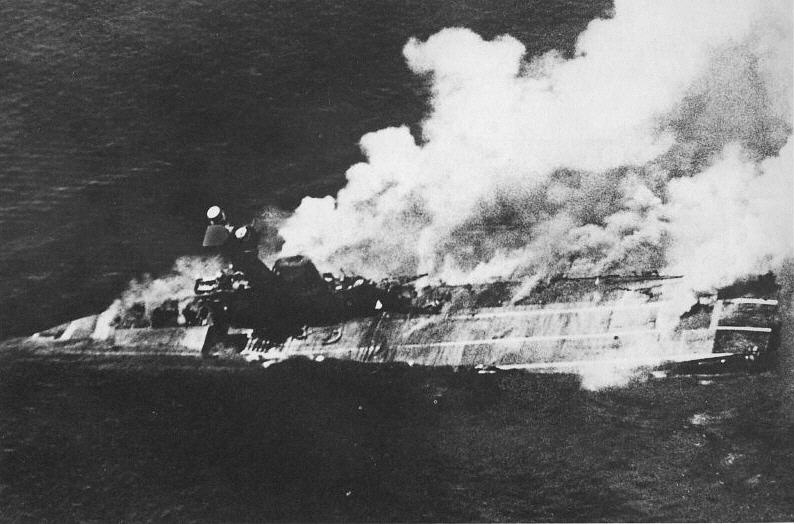
- Aircraft Carrier HMS Hermes (95) sinking during the Indian Ocean raid
Date	1940 - 15 August 1945
Location	Indian Ocean and its surroundings
Result	Allied victory

Belligerents
Allies: United Kingdom; India; Burma; Ceylon; Aden; Bahrain; Iraq (from 1941); Kuwait; Qatar; Trucial States; Abu Dhabi; Dubai; Kenya; Somaliland; Tanganyika; South Africa; Australia; Netherlands; Free France; United States (from 1941); New Zealand; Canada	Axis: Japan; Germany; Italy (until 1943); Vichy France (until 1942); Madagascar; Ceylonese mutineers (1942)

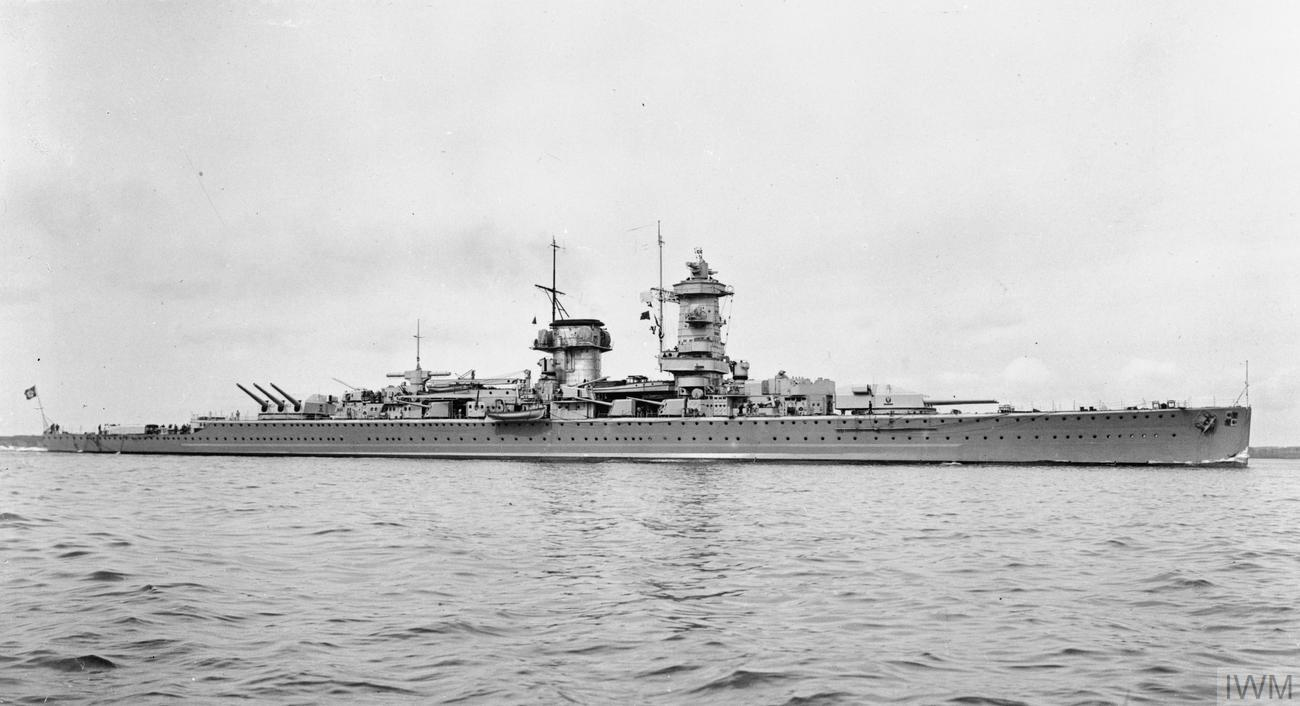
The pocket battleship Admiral Graf Spee brought World War II to the Indian Ocean in 1939.

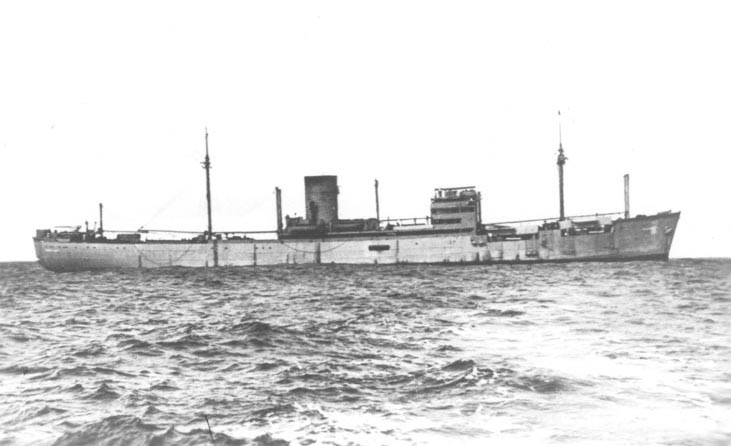
Atlantis was the first disguised commerce raider in the Indian Ocean.

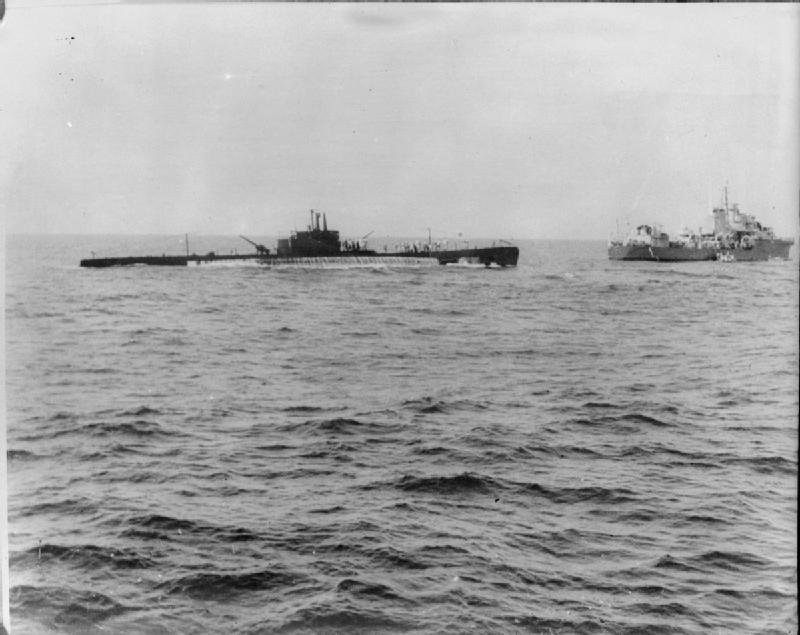
Galileo Galilei was one of eight Italian submarines operating out of Massawa, and is shown here being captured by the Royal Navy.

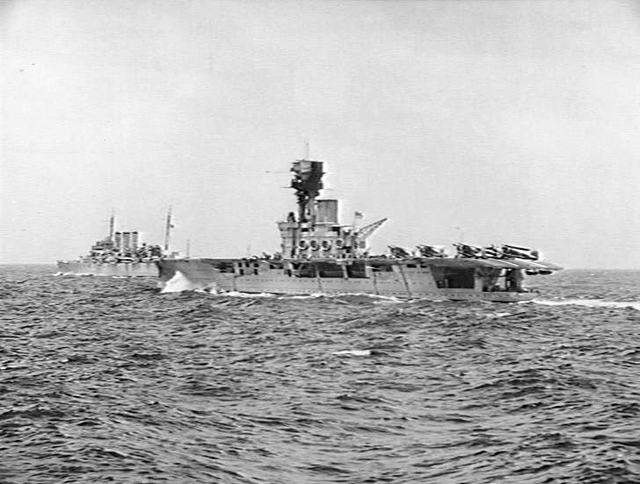
HMS Hermes as a convoy escort during the first year of wartime patrols.

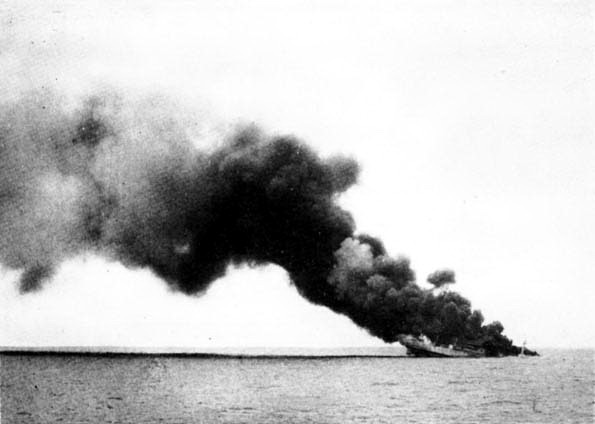
Italian commerce raider Ramb I sinking.

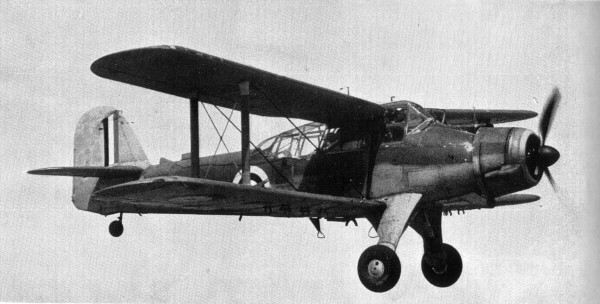
Fairey Albacore bombers launched from HMS Formidable raided Massawa.

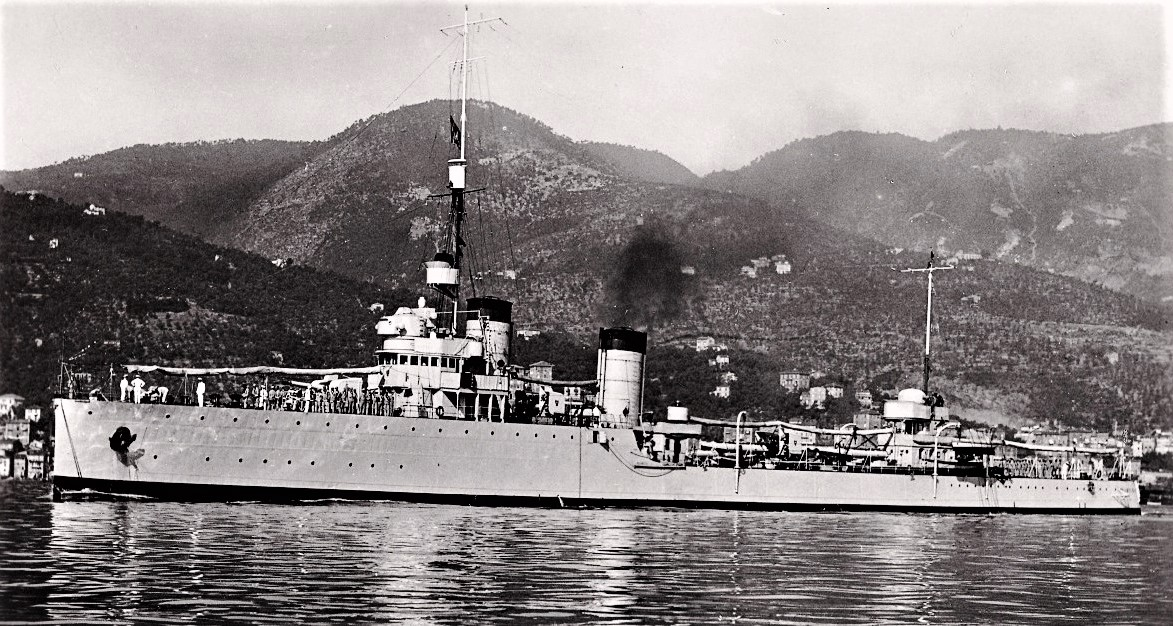
Pantera was one of the destroyers based at Massawa destroyed when the Allies captured Italy's east African colonies.

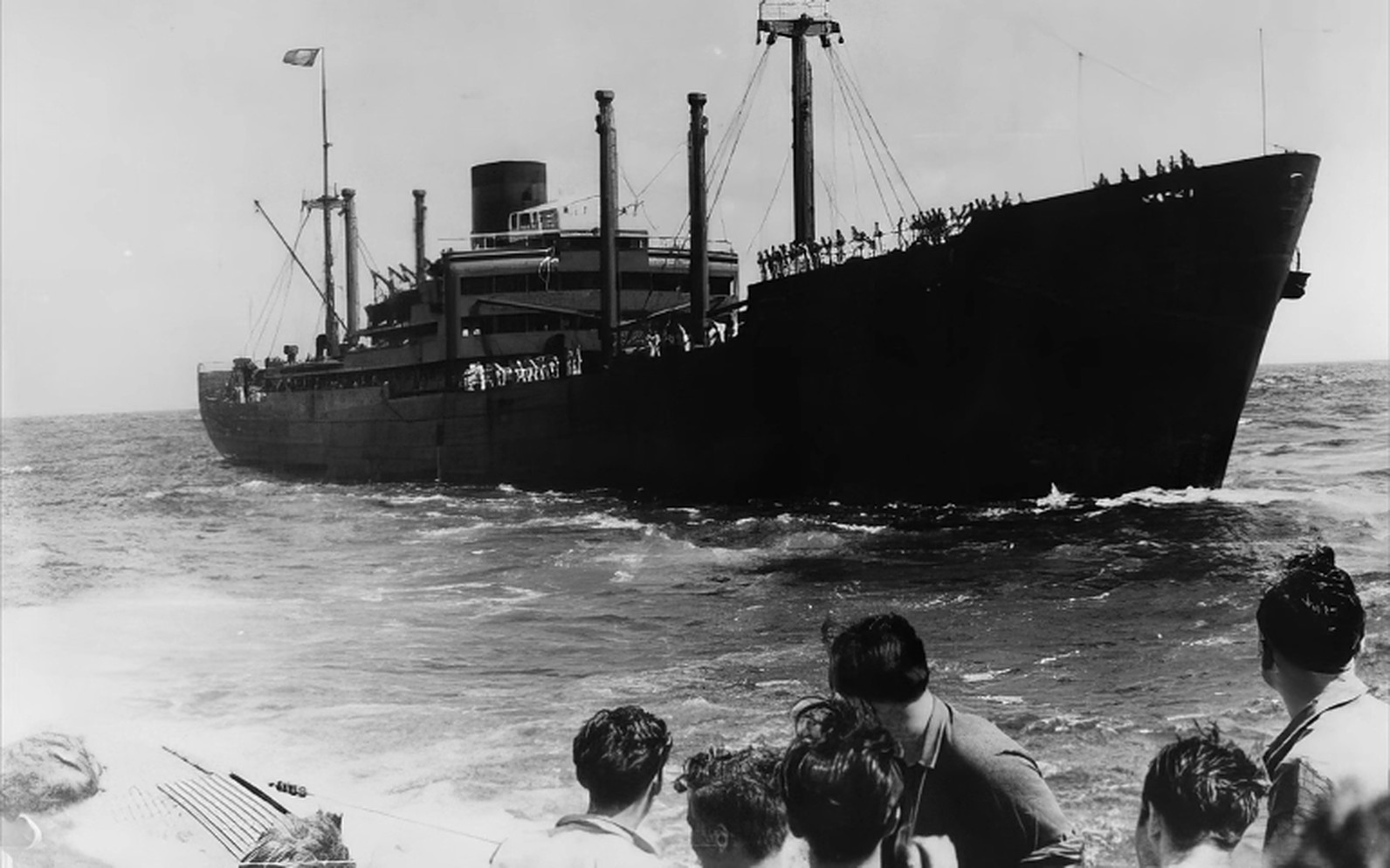
Commerce raider Kormoran preparing to refuel a U-boat.

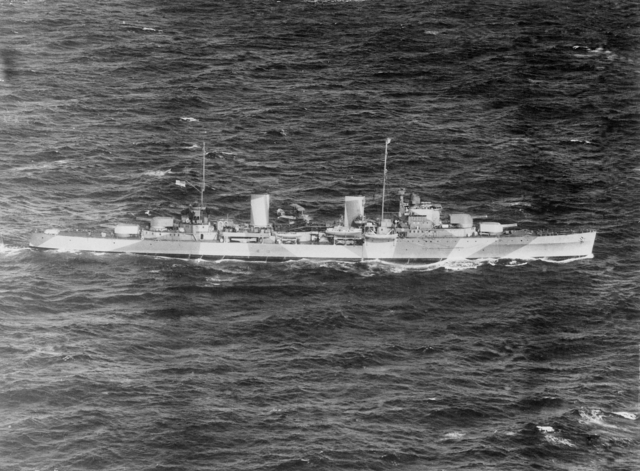
HMAS Sydney was the only cruiser to be sunk by a commerce raider.

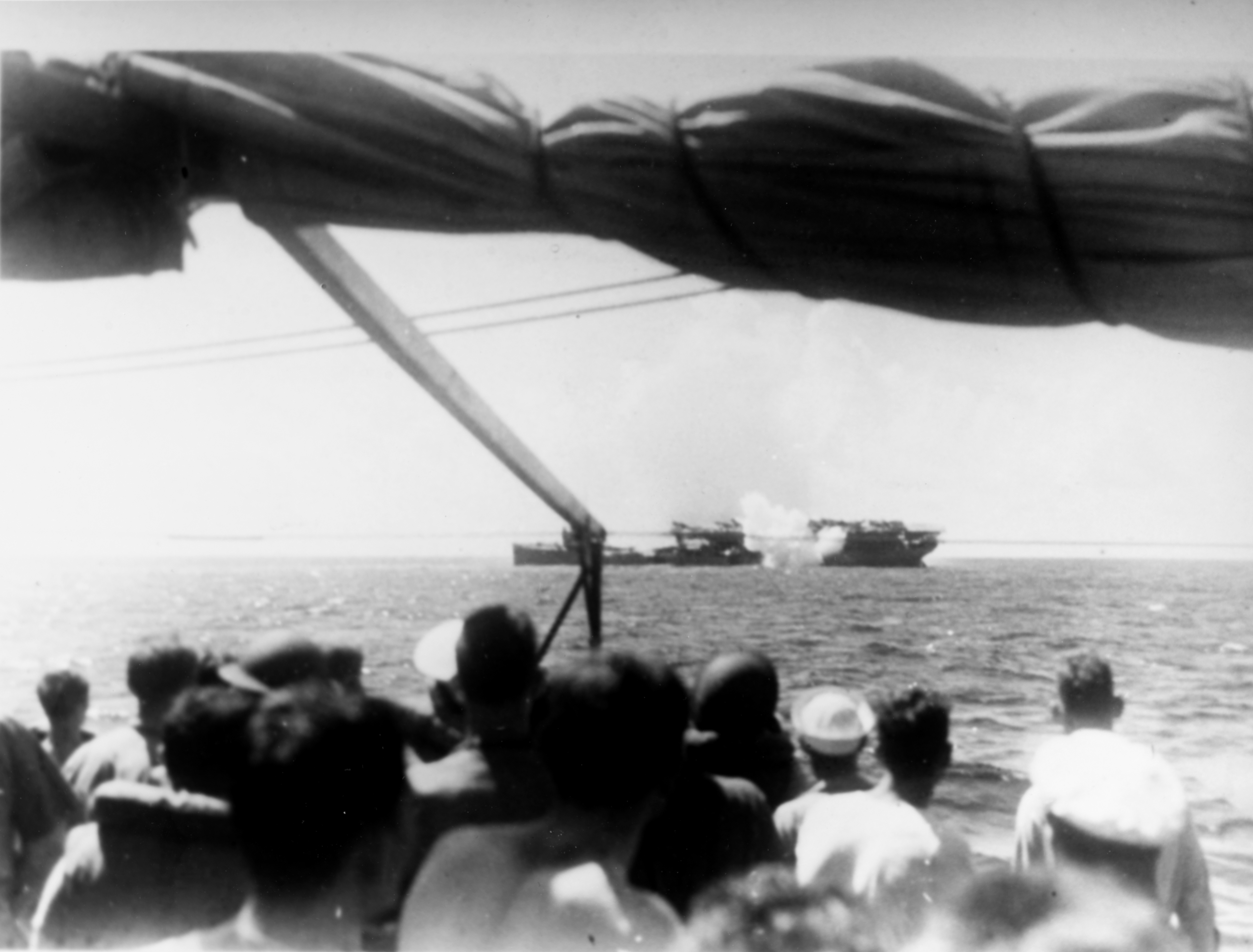
USS Langley under air attack south of Java.

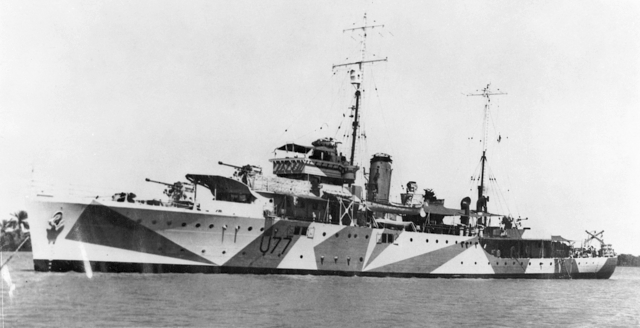
HMAS Yarra was sunk by Japanese warships south of Java.

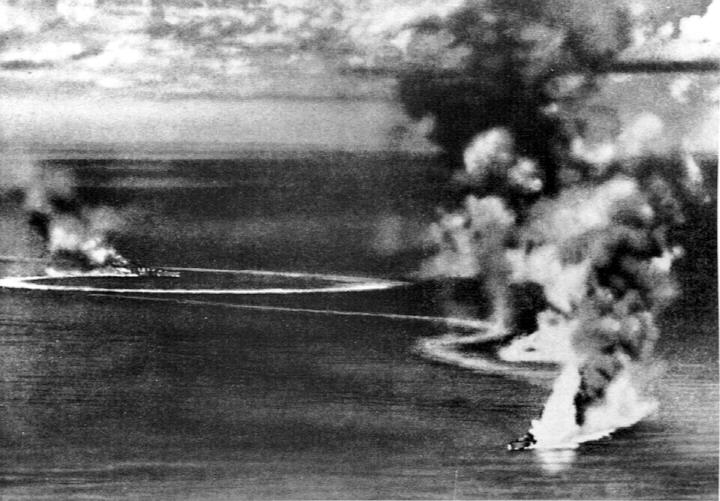
HMS Cornwall and HMS Dorsetshire under attack by Japanese dive bombers on 5 April 1942.

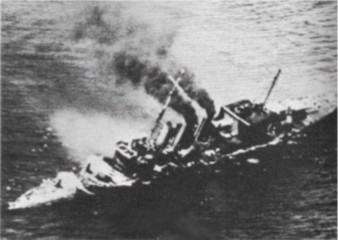
HMS Cornwall sinking following air attack.

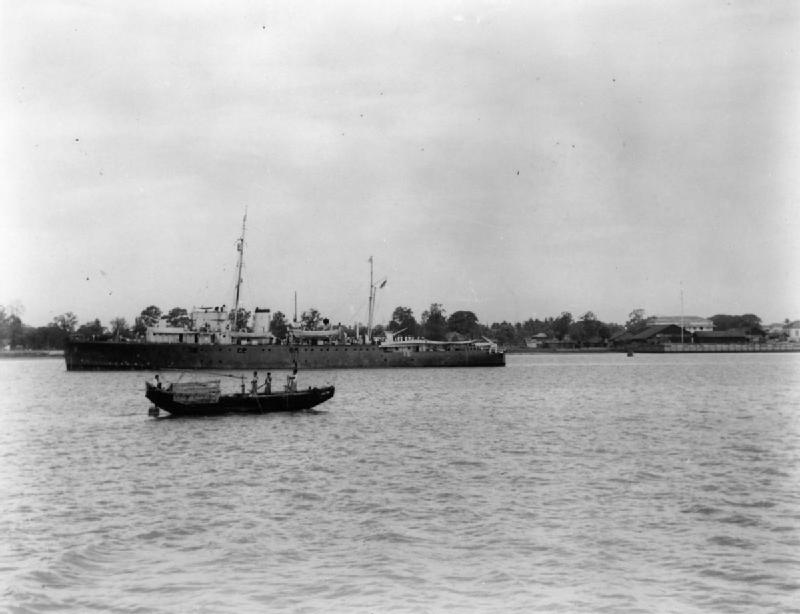
HMIS Indus in Akyab harbour, Burma, 1942.

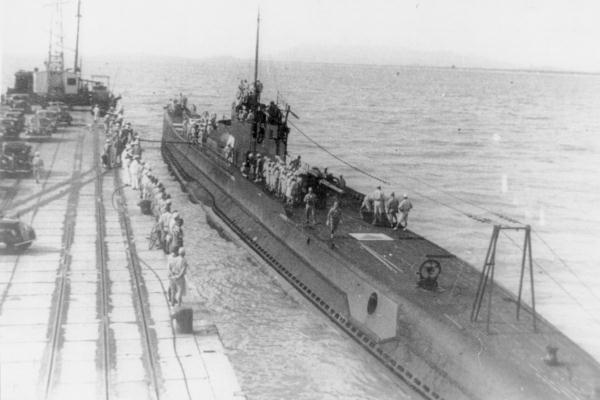
Japanese submarine I-10 shown at Penang between Indian Ocean patrols.

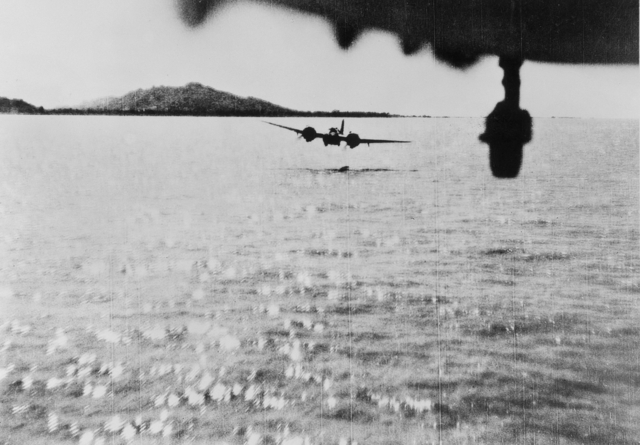
Bristol Blenheims of No. 60 Squadron RAF flying low to attack a Japanese coaster off Akyab, Burma on 11 October 1942.

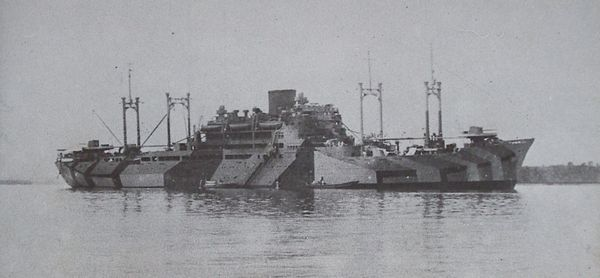
Japanese commerce raider Hōkoku Maru.

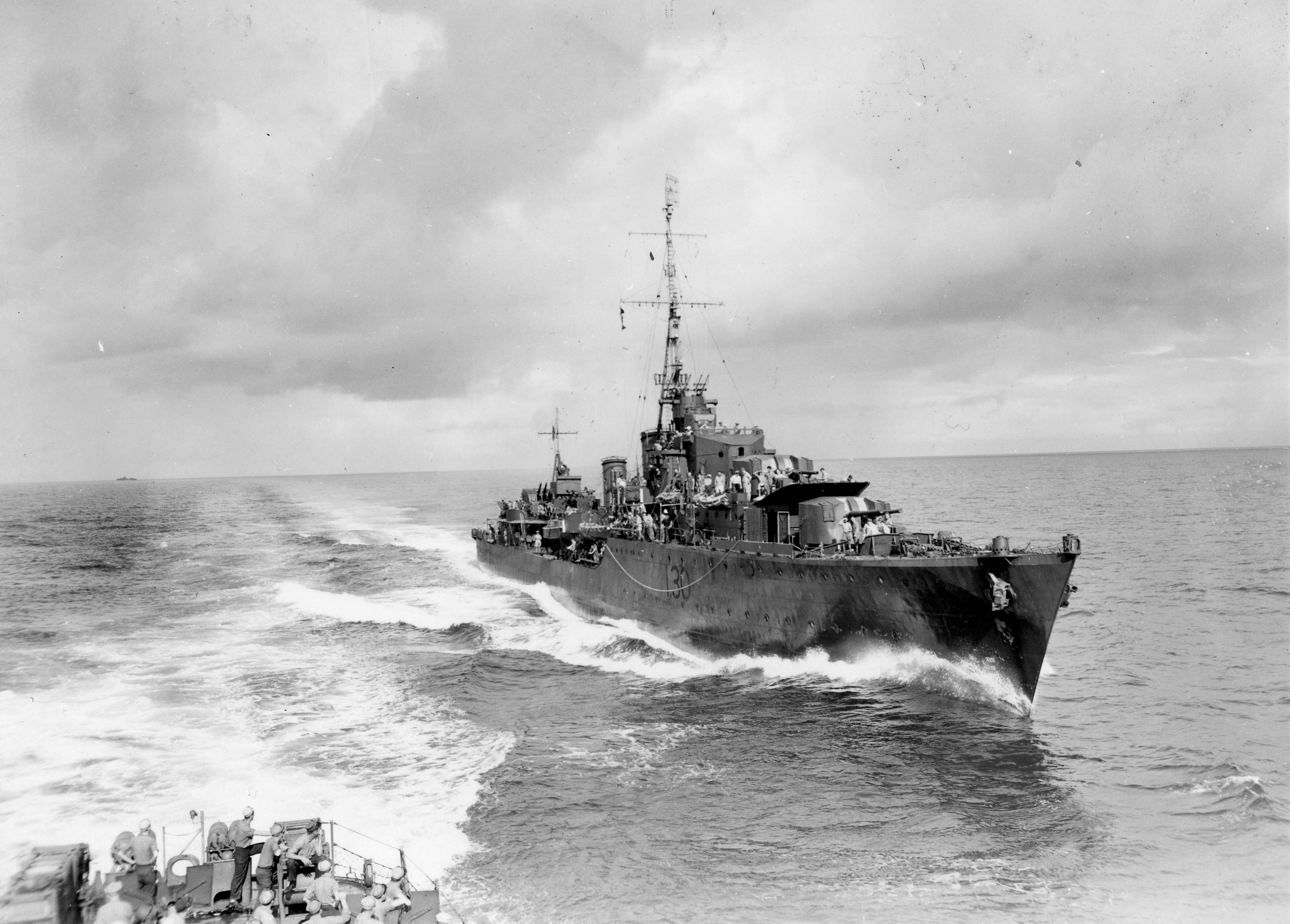
HMAS Arunta evacuated troops from Japanese-occupied Timor.

Italy's most successful submarine Leonardo da Vinci sank ships in the western Indian Ocean during patrols from European bases.

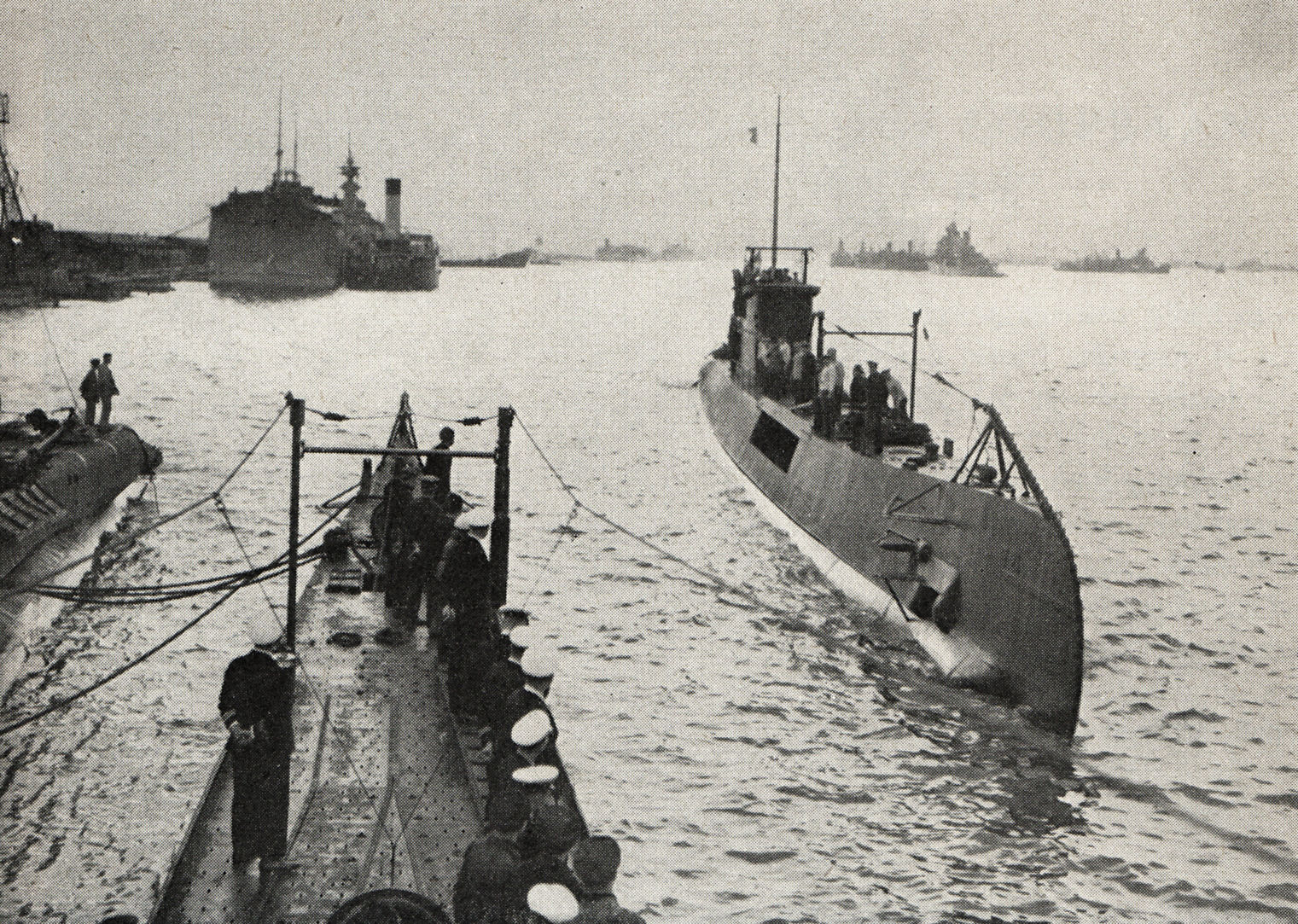
Dutch submarine O-21 patrolled the Andaman Sea.

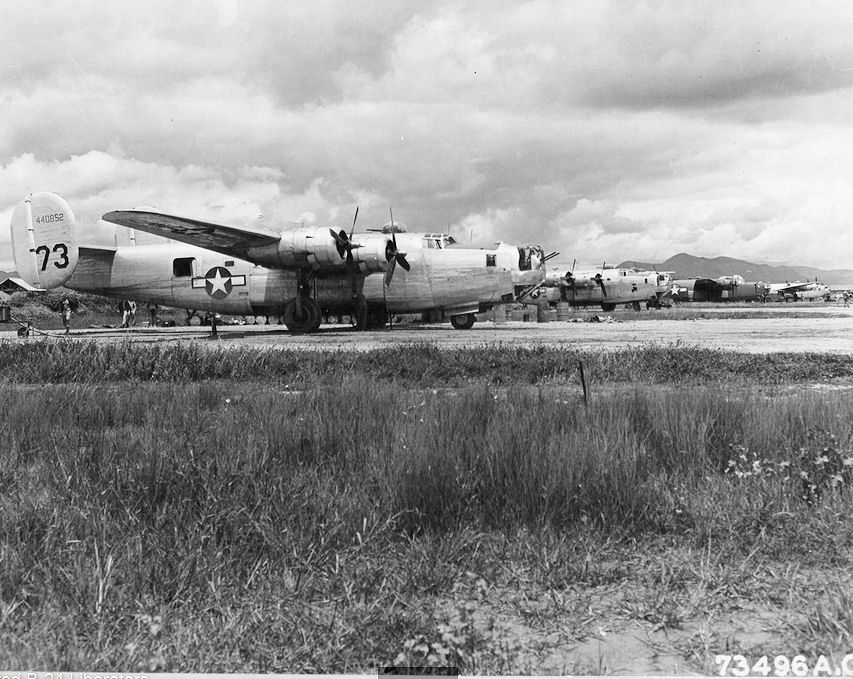
Tenth Air Force B-24 Liberators sank several ships in the Andaman Sea.

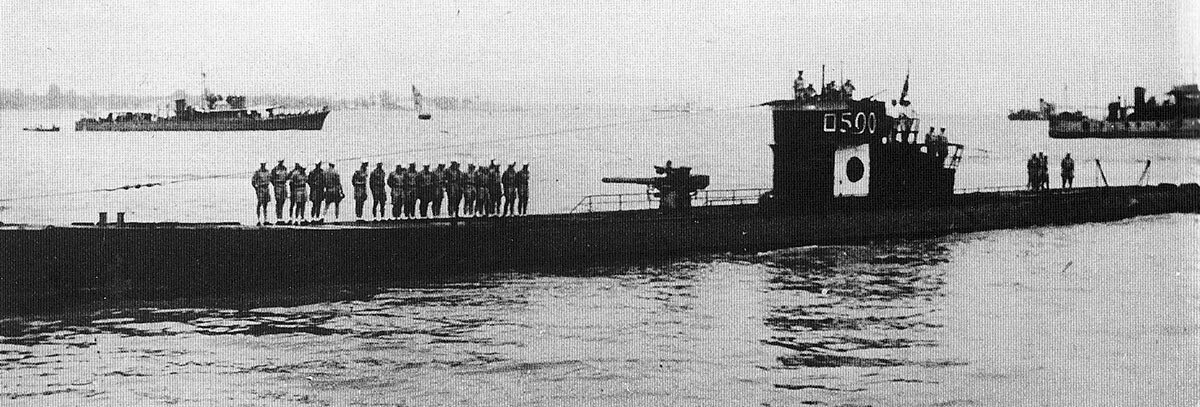
German submarine U-511 was the first U-boat to reach the eastern Indian Ocean and was presented to Japan as IJN RO-500.

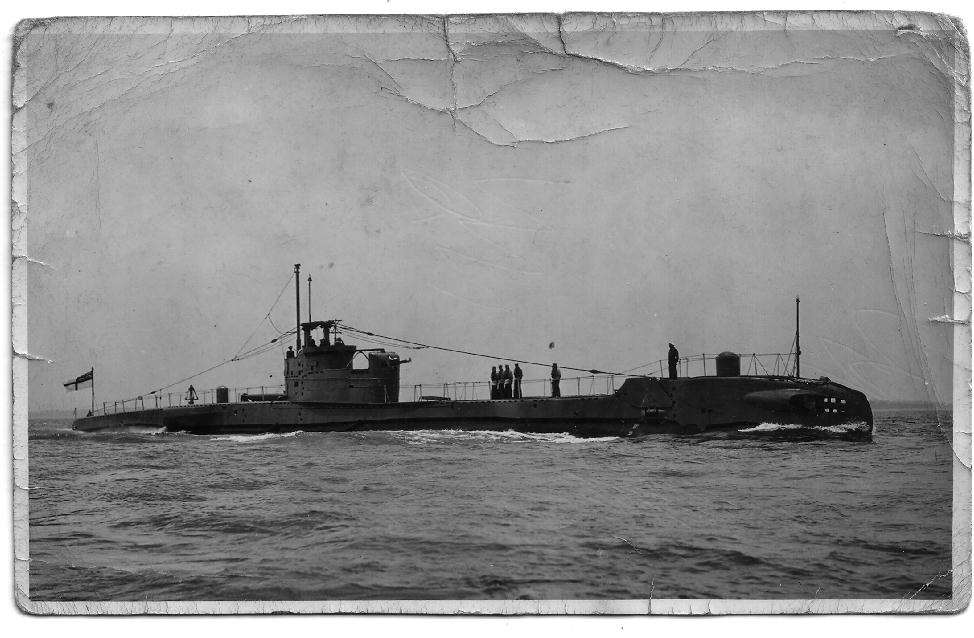
HMS Tally-Ho was one of several British T-class submarines patrolling the Strait of Malacca.

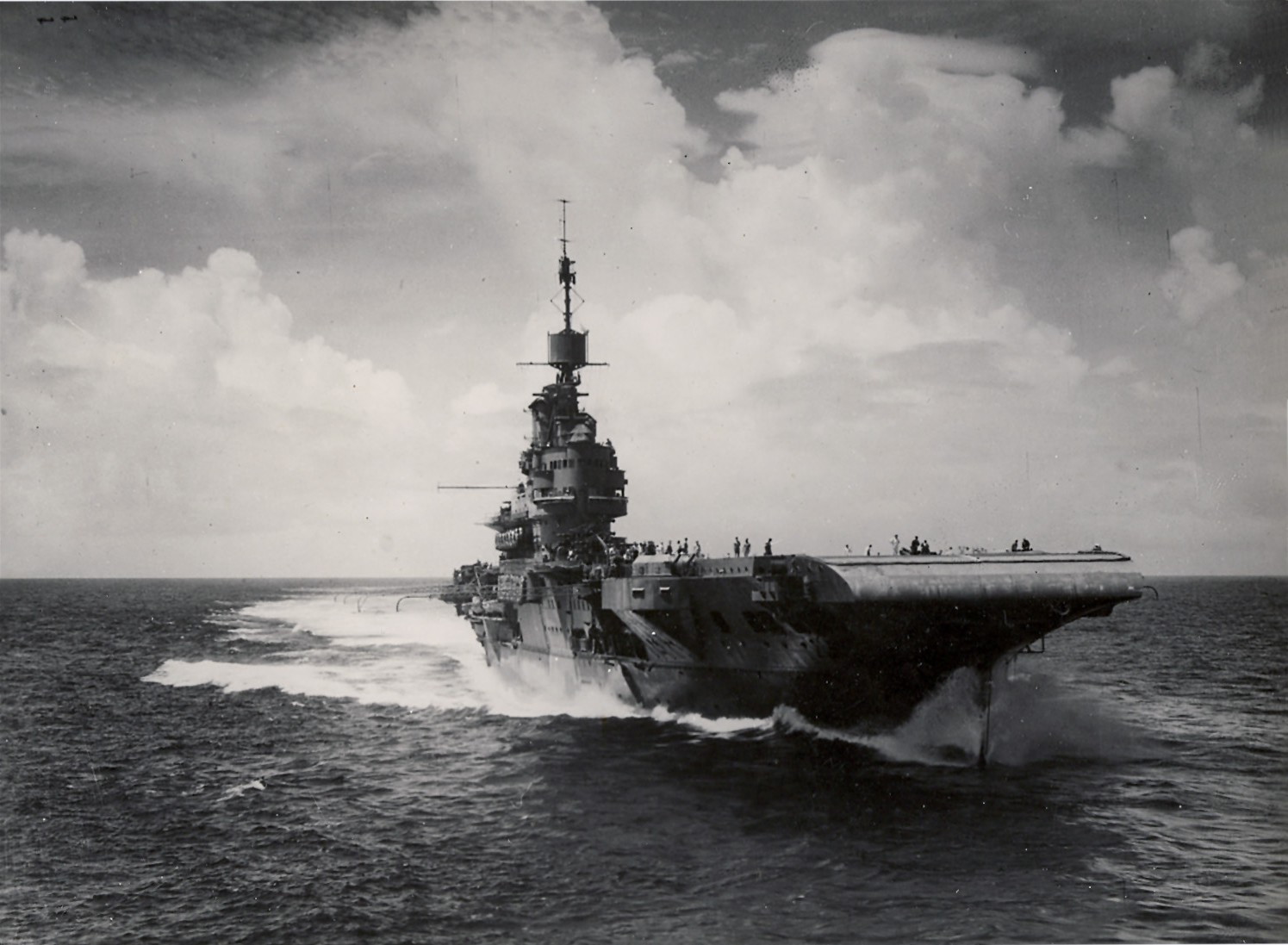
HMS Illustrious operated with USS Saratoga for Indian Ocean air raids.

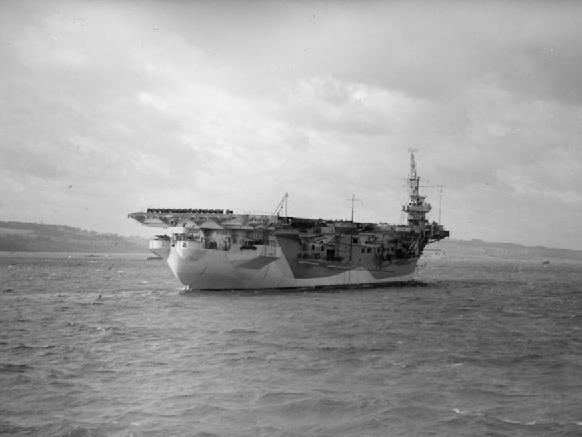
HMS Khedive was one of several escort carriers serving in the Indian Ocean.

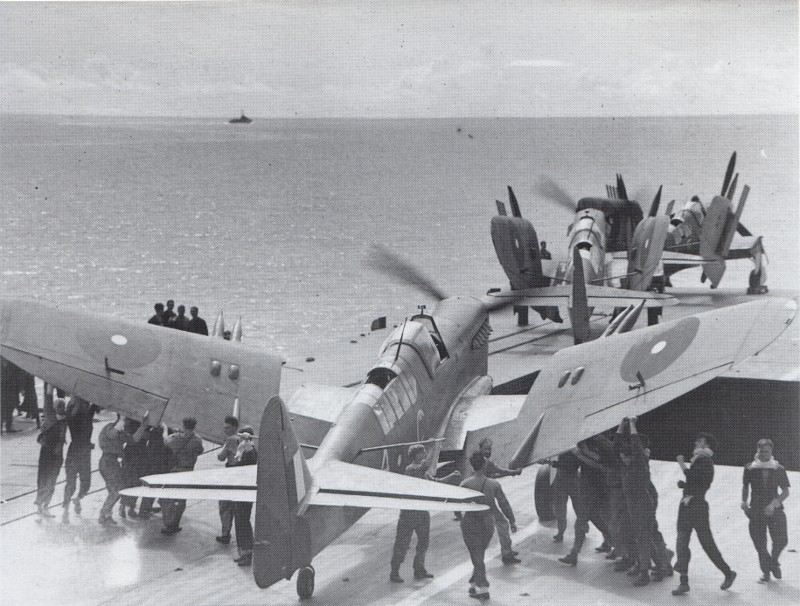
Fireflies returning to HMS Indefatigable following Operation Lentil airstrikes.

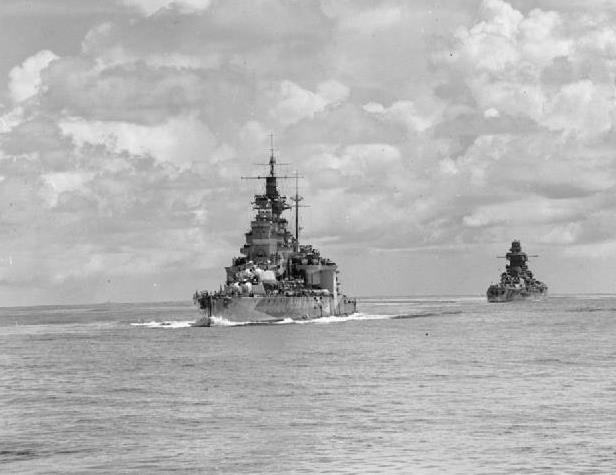
Battleships HMS Valiant and Richelieu during Operation Bishop.

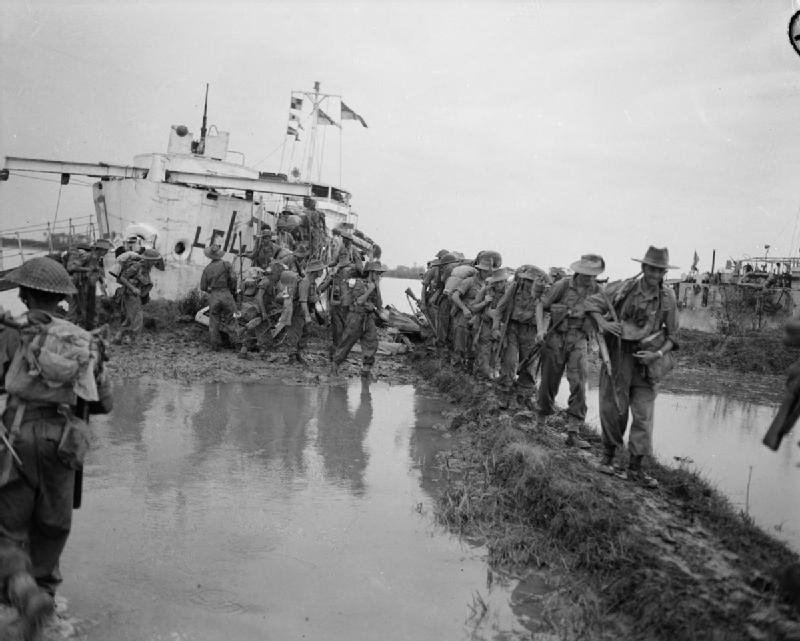
Operation Dracula was the last major amphibious landing in the Indian Ocean.

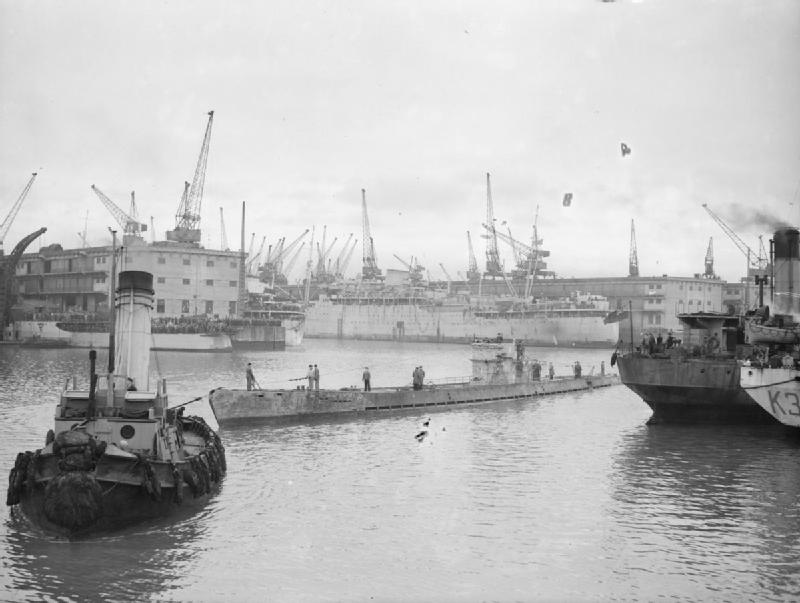
German submarine U-532 was the last of the Monsun Gruppe to return to Europe, and is shown arriving in Liverpool after the German surrender.

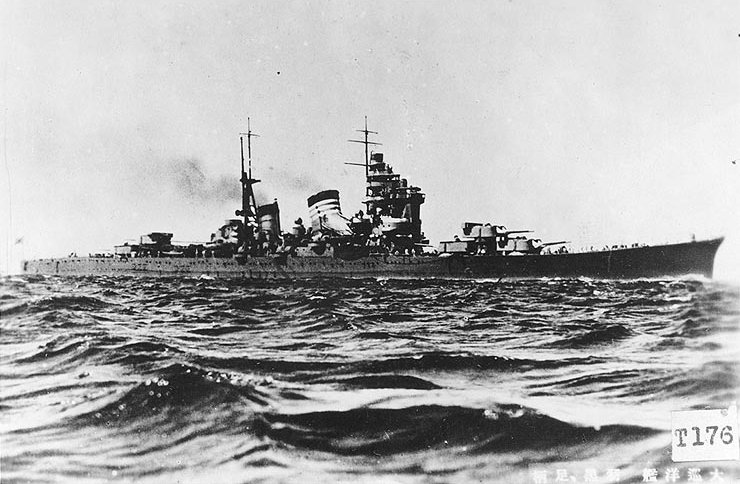
Haguro was sunk evacuating Japanese troops from Port Blair.

Prior to World War II, the Indian Ocean was an important maritime trade route between European nations and their colonial territories in East Africa, the Arabian Peninsula, British India, Indochina, the East Indies (Indonesia), and Australia for a long time. Naval presence was dominated by the Royal Navy Eastern Fleet and the Royal Australian Navy as World War II began, with a major portion of the Royal Netherlands Navy operating in the Dutch East Indies and the Red Sea Flotilla of the Italian Regia Marina operating from Massawa.

Axis naval forces gave a high priority to disrupting Allied trade in the Indian Ocean. Initial anti-shipping measures of unrestricted submarine warfare and covert raiding ships expanded to include airstrikes by aircraft carriers and raids by cruisers of the Imperial Japanese Navy. A Kriegsmarine Monsun Gruppe of U-boats operated from the eastern Indian Ocean after the Persian Corridor became an important military supply route to the Soviet Union.

== Chronology ==
- 15 November 1939: Australian, British and French warships began patrolling the Indian Ocean when the German pocket battleship Admiral Graf Spee sank the tanker Africa Shell south of Madagascar.

=== 1940 ===
The Regia Marina Red Sea Flotilla based at Massawa provided a focal point for Indian Ocean naval activity following Italian declaration of war on 10 June 1940; although Indian Ocean patrols of Kriegsmarine merchant raiders required defensive dispersion of Allied cruisers after May.

- 23 March 1940: The Royal Navy established the Malaya Force of cruisers, destroyers and submarines to stop German merchant ships leaving the Dutch East Indies.
- 11 May 1940: German merchant raider Atlantis entered the Indian Ocean from the South Atlantic.
- 7 June 1940: Italian warships began minelaying off Massawa and Assab.
- 10 June 1940: Eight Italian submarines began war patrols of the Indian Ocean from Massawa. Some of these submarines were lost because leakage of chloromethane air conditioning refrigerants caused central nervous system poisoning of their crews from recirculating air during submerged operations.
- 10 June 1940: Atlantis captured the freighter Tirranna in the Central Indian Ocean.
- 16 June 1940: Italian submarine Galileo Galilei sank the tanker James Stove.
- 19 June 1940: Galileo Galilei was captured by the British naval trawler Moonstone.
- 23 June 1940: Italian submarine Torricelli sank HMS Khartoum before being sunk by accompanying destroyers.
- 24 June 1940: Italian submarine Galvani sank the sloop HMIS Pathan before being sunk by the sloop HMS Falmouth.
- 11 July 1940: Atlantis sank the freighter City of Bagdad south of India.
- 13 July 1940: Atlantis sank the freighter Kemmendine south of India.
- 2 August 1940: Atlantis sank the freighter Tallyrand in the central Indian Ocean.
- 17 August 1940: Royal Navy and Royal Australian Navy cruisers and destroyers covered the withdrawal of British troops from British Somaliland to Aden.
- 24 August 1940: Atlantis sank the freighter King City in the Central Indian Ocean.
- 26 August 1940: German merchant raider Pinguin sank the tanker Filefjell south of Madagascar.
- 27 August 1940: Pinguin sank the tanker British Commander and the freighter Morviken south of Madagascar.
- 6 September 1940: Italian submarine Guglielmotti sank the tanker Atlas in the Red Sea.
- 9 September 1940: Atlantis sank the tanker Athelking in the central Indian Ocean.
- 10 September 1940: Atlantis sank the freighter Benarty in the central Indian Ocean.
- 12 September 1940: Pinguin sank the freighter Benavon east of Madagascar.
- 16 September 1940: Pinguin captured the freighter Nordvard in the central Indian Ocean.
- 20 September 1940: Atlantis sank the liner Commissaire Ramel west of Sumatra.
- 7 October 1940: Pinguin captured the tanker Storstad south of Java.
- 21 October 1940: Italian destroyer Francesco Nullo was sunk during the battle of Mumbai to Suez Canal convoy BN 7.
- 22 October 1940: Atlantis captured the freighter Durmitor west of Sumatra.
- 9 November 1940: Atlantis sank the freighter Teddy west of Sumatra.
- 10 November 1940: Atlantis captured the tanker Ole Jacob west of Sumatra.
- 11 November 1940: Atlantis sank the freighter Automedon west of Sumatra.
- 18 November 1940: HMS Dorsetshire shelled Italian Somaliland.
- 18 November 1940: Pinguin sank the freighter Nowshera west of Australia.
- 20 November 1940: Pinguin sank the freighter Maioma west of Australia.
- 21 November 1940: Pinguin sank the freighter Port Brisbane west of Australia.
- 30 November 1940: Pinguin sank the freighter Port Wellington in the central Indian Ocean.

=== 1941 ===
Early focus was Allied neutralisation and capture of Regia Marina African naval bases, followed by invasions of Iraq in April and Iran in August, to displace governments friendly to the Axis powers. Later Allied focus was on destruction of Kriegsmarine commerce raiders and moving troops to defend against anticipated Japanese expansion into south-east Asia.

- 24 January 1941: German merchant raider Atlantis sank the freighter Mandasor north of Madagascar.
- 31 January 1941: Atlantis captured the freighter Speybank north of Madagascar.
- 2 February 1941: HMS Formidable aircraft raided Mogadishu as Operation Breach. Atlantis captured the tanker Ketty Brövig north of Madagascar.
- 3 February 1941: German pocket battleship Admiral Scheer entered the Indian Ocean from the South Atlantic.
- 10 February 1941: HMS Shropshire, Hermes, Hawkins, Capetown, Ceres and Kandahar formed Force T supporting the Allied offensive against Italian Somaliland from Kenya.
- 13 February 1941: Fourteen Fairey Albacore from HMS Formidable sank SS Monacalieri in the Operation Composition raid on Massawa.
- 20 February 1941: Admiral Scheer sank the freighter Grigorios C and captured the tanker British Advocate north of Madagascar.
- 21 February 1941: Seven Fairey Albacore from HMS Formidable raided Massawa. Admiral Scheer sank the freighter Canadian Cruiser north of Madagascar.
- 22 February 1941: Admiral Scheer sank the freighter Rantaupandjang north of Madagascar.
- 27 February 1941: Action of 27 February 1941, HMS Leander sank the Italian merchant raider Ramb I west of the Maldives.
- 1 March 1941: Five Fairey Albacore from HMS Formidable raided Massawa.
- 3 March 1941: Admiral Scheer returned to the South Atlantic to evade Allied warships.
- 4 March 1941: The four surviving Italian submarines abandoned the Massawa base and escaped into the South Atlantic. The German supply ship Coburg and prize Ketty Brövig were scuttled when stopped by HMAS Canberra and HMNZS Leander, north of Madagascar.
- 16 March 1941: Invasion of Berbera by Royal Navy Force D.
- 23 March 1941: The German SS Oder was scuttled when stopped by HMS Shoreham in the Gulf of Aden.
- 1 April 1941: The German SS Bertrand Rickmers was scuttled when stopped by HMS Kandahar.
- 8 April 1941: Six Italian destroyers and 17 Axis merchant ships were sunk or scuttled when Allied troops captured Massawa. Atlantis left the Indian Ocean via the South Atlantic.
- 19 April 1941: British invasion of Basra prelude to the Anglo-Iraqi War.
- 25 April 1941: German merchant raider Pinguin sank the freighter Empire Light in the Arabian Sea.
- 28 April 1941: Pinguin sank the freighter Clan Buchanan in the Arabian Sea.
- 7 May 1941: Pinguin sank the tanker British Emperor in the Arabian Sea.
- 8 May 1941: HMS Cornwall sank Pinguin in the Arabian Sea.
- 10 June 1941: British invasion of Assab as Operation Chronometer.
- 26 June 1941: German merchant raider Kormoran sank the freighters Velebit and Mareeba in the Bay of Bengal.
- 25 August 1941: The Royal Navy supported the Anglo-Soviet invasion of Iran.
- 7 September 1941: Axis aircraft sank the freighter Steel Seafarer in the Red Sea.
- 24 September 1941: Kormoran sank the freighter Stamatios G. Embiricos in the Arabian Sea.
- 19 November 1941: Battle west of Australia between HMAS Sydney and Kormoran destroyed both ships.
- 30 November 1941: Free French forces replaced Vichy French in the battle of La Réunion.
- 2 December 1941: Convoy BM 9A arrived in Singapore with troops from Colombo.
- 17 December 1941: Sparrow Force delivered 650 Dutch and Australian troops to Timor.
- 27 December 1941: Convoy WS 24 arrived in Mumbai with 20,000 troops loaded at Halifax Harbour.

=== 1942 ===
Japanese submarine cruisers began patrolling the Indian Ocean during the Dutch East Indies campaign. Following the attack on Pearl Harbor, the Kido Butai fast carrier task force raided Darwin, Australia to cover the invasion of Timor and raided Ceylon to cover transport of Japanese troops to Rangoon. Kriegsmarine merchant raiders were less able to avoid Allied patrols; but the battle of the Atlantic spilled over into the Indian Ocean around Cape Agulhas as German Type IX submarines began patrolling the east coast of Africa.

- 4 January 1942: Japanese submarine I-56 sank the freighter Kwangtung south of Java.
- 8 January 1942: I-56 sank the liners Van Rees and Van Riebeek south of Java.
- 11 January 1942: Japanese submarine I-66 sank the freighter Liberty south of Java.
- 14 January 1942: Japanese submarine I-65 sank the freighter Jalarajan west of Sumatra.
- 17 January 1942: HMS Jupiter sank the Japanese submarine I-60 in the Sunda Strait.
- 19 January 1942: Japanese aircraft sank the liner Van Imhoff west of Sumatra.
- 20 January 1942: USS Edsall and Australian minesweepers sank the Japanese submarine I-124 off Darwin. Japanese submarine I-159 sank the freighter Eidsvold off Christmas Island.
- 21 January 1942: I-66 sank the freighter Nord off Rangoon.
- 22 January 1942: Japanese submarine I-64 sank the liner Van Overstraten west of Sumatra.
- 27 January 1942: HMS Indomitable flew off 48 Hawker Hurricanes for the defence of Java.
- 30 January 1942: I-64 sank the freighters Florence Luckenbach, Jalapalaka and Jalatarang in the Bay of Bengal.
- 15 February 1942: I-65 sank the freighter Johanne Justesen off Ceylon.
- 16 February 1942: An Allied troop convoy from Darwin to Timor was turned back by Japanese air attack.
- 19 February 1942: Japanese invasion of Bali. Bombing of Darwin by the Kido Butai sank USS Peary, the tanker British Motorist, the freighter Mauna Loa, and liners Neptuna and Zealandia.
- 20 February 1942: Japanese invasion of Timor. I-65 sank the freighter Bhima in the Arabian Sea.
- 25 February 1942: Japanese submarine I-58 sank the freighter Boero south of Java.
- 27 February 1942: Japanese aircraft sank USS Langley off Tjilatjap.
- 28 February 1942: Japanese submarine I-53 sank the freighter City of Manchester west of Sumatra, and I-4 sank the freighter Ban Ho Guan south of Java.
- 1 March 1942: Japanese battleships Hiei and Kirishima sank USS Edsall, USS Pecos and the freighter Tomohon, and Japanese cruiser Ashigara sank USS Pillsbury south of Java. Japanese submarine I-2 sank the freighter Parigi, I-59 sank the liner Rooseboom west of Sumatra, and Japanese submarine I-54 sank the freighter Modjekerto south of Java.
- 2 March 1942: Japanese warships sank the freighter Prominent off Tjilatjap, and Hayashio captured the freighter Sigli.
- 3 March 1942: Japanese warships sank USS Asheville south of Java, Japanese submarine I-1 sank the freighter Siantar off Tjilatjap, and Japanese aircraft sank the liner Koolama in the Timor Sea.
- 4 March 1942: Japanese warships sank HMS Stronghold, HMAS Yarra and the tanker Francol south of Java. Japanese submarine I-62 sank the freighter Merkus off Tjilatjap, and I-7 sank the liner Le Maire.
- 5 March 1942: Kido Butai aircraft sank the freighters Manipi, Tohiti, Rokan, Kidoel, Poelau Bras and Dayak raiding Tjilatjap. Poelau Bras lifeboats attacked.
- 7 March 1942: Allied naval forces covered the withdrawal of Allied troops from Rangoon. Japanese battleships Kongo and Haruna sank the freighter Woolgar while shelling Christmas Island.
- 8 March 1942: Japanese troops captured Rangoon.
- 9 March 1942: Japanese troops captured Java.
- 11 March 1942: Japanese submarine I-2 sank the freighter Chilka west of Sumatra.
- 12 March 1942: Japanese invasion of Medan
- 13 March 1942: Japanese submarine I-64 sank the freighter Mabella in the Arabian Sea.
- 23 March 1942: Japan invaded and captured the Andaman and Nicobar Islands as Operation D.
- 25 March 1942: A troop convoy delivered the 56th Division (Imperial Japanese Army) to Rangoon as Operation U.
- 26 March 1942: Kido Butai sailed from the Netherlands East Indies for Operation C.
- 31 March 1942: Operation X Japanese invasion and battle of Christmas Island.
- 1 April 1942: USS Seawolf torpedoed Naka off Christmas Island. HMS Truant sank Yae Maur and Shunsei Maru in the Strait of Malacca.
- 5 April 1942: Colombo Raid and Japanese carrier planes sank HMS Cornwall and HMS Dorsetshire in an Easter Sunday Raid.
- 6 April 1942: Japanese cruisers sank the liner Dardanus and freighters Silksworth, Autolycus, Malda, Shinkuang, Gandara, Indora, Bienville, Selma City, Ganges, Banjoewangi, Batavia, Taksang, Sinkiang, Exmoor and Van der Capellen in the Bay of Bengal during Operation C. Japanese submarine I-5 sank the freighter Washingtonian. Japanese aircraft sank HMIS Indus off Sittwe.
- 7 April 1942: A troop convoy delivered the 18th Division (Imperial Japanese Army) to Rangoon as Operation U.
- 9 April 1942: Trincomalee Raid and Japanese carrier planes sank HMS Hermes, HMAS Vampire, HMS Hollyhock and auxiliaries Athelstane and British Sergeant off Trincomalee.
- 5 May 1942: British invasion of Diego Suarez.
- 8 May 1942: Ceylonese soldiers mutinied on the Cocos Islands.
- 10 May 1942: German commerce raider Thor captured the liner Nanking west of Australia.
- 31 May 1942: Japanese midget submarines torpedoed HMS Ramillies and the tanker British Loyalty at Diego Suarez.
- 2 June 1942: Kofuku Maru was mined off Rangoon.
- 6 June 1942: Japanese submarine I-10 sank the Liberty ship Melvin H. Baker.
- 16 June 1942: Thor sank the tanker Olivia west of Australia.
- 19 June 1942: Thor captured the tanker Herborg west of Australia.
- 30 June 1942: I-10 sank the freighter Express.
- 4 July 1942: Thor captured the freighter Madrono west of Australia.
- 20 July 1942: Thor sank the freighter Indus west of Australia.
- 1 August 1942: Operation Stab begins, a diversion attempt by the British Eastern Fleet.
- 10 September 1942: Madagascar surrendered to British forces.
- 22 September 1942: Japanese submarine I-29 sank the freighter Paul Luckenbach.
- 24 September 1942: Japanese submarine I-165 sank the freighter Losmar.
- 17 October 1942: U-504 sank the freighter Empire Chaucer south of South Africa.
- 23 October 1942: U-504 sank the freighter SS City of Johannesburg east of South Africa.
- 26 October 1942: U-504 destroyed the Liberty Ship SS Anne Hutchinson east of South Africa.
- 29 October 1942: U-159 sank the freighters Ross and Laplace south of South Africa.
- 31 October 1942: U-504 sank the freighters Reynolds and Empire Guidon east of South Africa.
- 1 November 1942: U-178 sank the troopship Mendoza east of South Africa.
- 3 November 1942: U-504 sank the freighter Porto Alegre south of South Africa.
- 4 November 1942: U-178 sank the freighters Hai Hing and Trekieve east of South Africa.
- 7 November 1942: U-159 sank the freighter La Salle south of South Africa.
- 8 November 1942: U-181 sank the freighter Plaudit south of South Africa.
- 9 November 1942: Italian submarine Leonardo da Vinci sank the Liberty Ship Marcus Whitman.
- 10 November 1942: U-181 sank the freighter K.G. Meldahl south of South Africa.
- 11 November 1942: Japanese merchant raider Hōkoku Maru was sunk by the tanker Ondina and its escort HMIS Bengal.
- 13 November 1942: U-178 sank the freighter Louise Moller, and U-181 sank the freighter Excello east of South Africa.
- 19 November 1942: U-177 sank the freighter Scottish Chief, and U-181 sank the freighter Gunda east of South Africa.
- 20 November 1942: U-177 sank the Liberty ship Pierce Butler, and U-181 sank the freighter Corinthiakos east of South Africa.
- 21 November 1942: U-181 sank the freighter Alcoa Pathfinder east of South Africa.
- 24 November 1942: U-181 sank the freighters Mount Helmos and Dorington Court east of South Africa.
- 26 November 1942: German blockade runner Ramses scuttled when stopped by escorts of convoy OW 1.
- 27 November 1942: U-178 sank the Liberty ship Jeremiah Wadsworth south of South Africa.
- 28 November 1942: U-177 sank the troopship Nova Scotia drowning 750, and U-181 sank the freighter Evanthia east of South Africa.
- 30 November 1942: German commerce raider Michel sank the freighter Sawokla, U-177 sank the troopship Llandaff Castle east of South Africa, and U-181 sank the freighter Cleanthis in the Mozambique Channel.
- 1 December 1942: HMAS Armidale was sunk by Japanese aircraft while evacuating personnel from Timor.
- 2 December 1942: U-181 sank the freighter Amarylis east of South Africa.
- 7 December 1942: Michel sank the freighter Eugenie Livonos east of South Africa, and U-177 sank the freighter Saronikos in the Mozambique Channel.
- 12 December 1942: U-177 sank the freighter RFA Empire Gull east of South Africa.
- 14 December 1942: U-177 sank the freighter Sawahloento east of South Africa.

=== 1943 ===
Axis submarine patrols of Indian Ocean trade routes were expanded with establishment of a Kriegsmarine base in Penang as Allied anti-submarine patrols became increasingly effective in the Atlantic. Allied submarines and aircraft began patrolling the Strait of Malacca and Andaman Sea to intercept shipping supporting Japanese forces in Burma.

- 10 January 1943: HMAS Arunta evacuated 313 troops and civilians from Timor.
- 15 January 1943: Five-hundred Allied prisoners of war drowned when Tenth Air Force B-24 Liberators sank the Nichimei Maru in the Andaman Sea.
- 11 February 1943: U-516 sank the freighter Helmsprey east of South Africa.
- 17 February 1943: U-182 sank the freighter Llanashe and U-516 sank the freighter Deer Lodge east of South Africa.
- 18 February 1943: Convoy Prophet returned 30,000 soldiers of the Australian 9th Division from Africa to Australia.
- 26 February 1943: Kyo Maru No. 3 was mined off Rangoon.
- 27 February 1943: Tenth Air Force B-24s sank Asakasan Maru in the Andaman Sea. U-516 sank the Dutch submarine tender Columbia east of South Africa.
- 3 March 1943: U-160 sank the Liberty ship Harvey W. Scott and the freighter Nipura east of South Africa.
- 4 March 1943: U-160 sank the freighters Marietta and Empire Mahseer east of South Africa.
- 7 March 1943: U-506 sank the freighter Sabor east of South Africa.
- 8 March 1943: U-160 sank the Liberty ship James B. Stephens east of South Africa.
- 9 March 1943: Interned German freighters Drachenfels, Ehrenfels and Braunfels were scuttled at Goa. U-506 sank the Norwegian freighter Tabor south of South Africa.
- 11 March 1943: U-160 sank the freighter Aelbryn, and U-182 sank the Liberty ship Richard D. Spaight east of South Africa.
- 13 March 1943: Dutch submarine O-21 sank Kasuga Maru No. 2.
- 20 March 1943: Japanese submarine I-27 sank the freighter Fort Mumford off India.
- 5 April 1943: U-182 sank the freighter Aloe east of South Africa.
- 18 April 1943: U-180 sank the tanker Corbis east of South Africa.
- 21 April 1943: Italian submarine Leonardo da Vinci sank the Liberty Ship John Drayton.
- 11 May 1943: U-181 sank the freighter Tinhow, and U-196 sank the freighter Nailsea Meadow east of South Africa.
- 17 May 1943: U-198 sank the freighter Northmoor east of South Africa.
- 27 May 1943: U-181 sank the freighter Sicilia in the Mozambique Channel.
- 29 May 1943: U-198 sank the freighter Hopetarn east of South Africa.
- 1 June 1943: U-178 sank the freighter Salabangka east of South Africa.
- 3 June 1943: I-27 sank the freighter Montanan.
- 5 June 1943: U-198 sank the freighter Dumra east of South Africa.
- 6 June 1943: U-198 sank the Liberty ship William King east of South Africa.
- 7 June 1943: U-181 sank the freighter Harrier east of South Africa.
- 19 June 1943: Japanese submarine I-37 sank the Liberty ship Henry Knox.
- 27 June 1943: U-511 sank the Liberty Ship Sebastian Cermeno south of Madagascar.
- 2 July 1943: U-181 sank the liner Hoihow east of Madagascar.
- 4 July 1943: U-178 sank the freighters Breiviken and Michael Livanos in the Mozambique Channel.
- 5 July 1943: I-27 damaged the freighter Alcoa Prospector.
- 6 July 1943: U-177 sank the freighter SS Jasper Park, and U-198 sank the freighter Hydraios east of South Africa.
- 7 July 1943: U-198 sank the freighter Leana in the Mozambique Channel.
- 9 July 1943: U-511 sank the Liberty Ship Samuel Heintzelman in the central Indian Ocean.
- 10 July 1943: U-177 sank the Liberty Ship Alice F. Palmer south of Madagascar.
- 11 July 1943: U-178 sank the freighter Mary Livanos in the Mozambique Channel.
- 14 July 1943: U-178 sank the Liberty ship Robert Bacon in the Mozambique Channel.
- 15 July 1943: U-181 sank the freighter Empire Lake east of Madagascar.
- 16 July 1943: U-181 sank the freighter Fort Franklin east of Madagascar.
- 17 July 1943: U-178 sank the freighter City of Canton in the Mozambique Channel.
- 24 July 1943: U-197 sank the tanker Pegasus east of South Africa.
- 28 July 1943: Tenth Air Force B-24s sank Tamishima Maru in the Andaman Sea.
- 29 July 1943: U-178 sank the freighter Cornish City east of South Africa.
- 1 August 1943: U-198 sank the freighter Mangkalihat east of South Africa.
- 3 August 1943: U-196 sank the freighter City of Oran in the Mozambique Channel.
- 4 August 1943: U-181 sank the freighter Dalfram east of Madagascar.
- 5 August 1943: U-178 sank the freighter Efthalia Mari east of Madagascar.
- 7 August 1943: U-181 sank the freighter Umvuma east of Madagascar.
- 12 August 1943: U-181 sank the freighter Clan Macarthur south of Madagascar.
- 17 August 1943: U-197 sank the freighter Empire Stanley south of Madagascar.
- 20 August 1943: U-197 was sunk east of South Africa by No. 259 Squadron RAF and No. 265 Squadron RAF Consolidated PBY Catalinas.
- 23 August 1943: Tenth Air Force B-24s sank Heito Maru in the Andaman Sea.
- 27 August 1943: German U-boat base established at Penang.
- 14 September 1943: Japanese submarine I-10 sank the tanker Bramora south-west of Chagos Islands.
- 19 September 1943: U-532 sank the freighter Fort Longueuil east of Madagascar.
- 20 September 1943: Monsun Gruppe submarine Ammiraglio Cagni surrendered at Durban after the Italian armistice.
- 21 September 1943: U-188 sank the Liberty ship Cornelia P. Spencer north of Madagascar.
- 24 September 1943: Japanese submarine I-10 sank the Liberty ship Elias Howe.
- 29 September 1943: U-532 sank the freighter Banffshire in the Arabian Sea.
- 1 October 1943: U-532 sank the freighter Tahsinia in the Arabian Sea.
- 2 October 1943: U-168 sank the freighter Haiching in the Arabian Sea.
- 11 October 1943: U-532 sank the freighter Jalabala in the Arabian Sea.
- 16 October 1943: No. 244 Squadron RAF Bristol Blenheims sank U-533 in the Persian Gulf.
- 13 November 1943: HMS Taurus sank Japanese submarine I-34 in the Strait of Malacca.
- 3 December 1943: Allied aircraft sank the steamer Assam near Rangoon.
- 5 December 1943: Japanese aircraft bombed Calcutta harbour.
- 7 December 1943: Operation Ratchet Allied at Regu Creek, Burma.
- 27 December 1943: U-178 sank the Liberty ship José Navarro in the Arabian Sea.
- 28 December 1943: Japanese submarine I-26 sank the Liberty ship Robert F. Hoke.

=== 1944 ===
Use of Ultra intelligence information increased successful interceptions by Allied submarines and reduced Axis resupply opportunities in the Indian Ocean. Surrender of the Regia Marina and destruction of Kriegsmarine battleships made Royal Navy aircraft carriers available for raids of the Andaman Sea.

- 2 January 1944: Japanese submarine I-26 sank the Liberty ship Albert Gallatin.
- 11 January 1944: HMS Tally-Ho sank the Japanese cruiser Kuma in the Strait of Malacca.
- 15 January 1944: HMS Tally-Ho sank Ryuko Maru in the Strait of Malacca.
- 20 January 1944: U-188 sank the freighter Fort Buckingham in the Arabian Sea.
- 23 January 1944: Tenth Air Force B-24 Liberators sank Seikai Maru in the Andaman Sea.
- 25 January 1944: U-188 sank the freighter Fort la Maune in the Arabian Sea.
- 26 January 1944: U-532 sank the Liberty ship Walter Camp in the Arabian Sea. U-188 sank the liner Surada and the freighter Samouri in the Arabian Sea.
- 29 January 1944: U-188 sank the freighter Olga E. Embiricos in the Arabian Sea.
- 3 February 1944: U-188 sank the Liberty ship Chung Cheng in the Arabian Sea.
- 9 February 1944: U-188 sank the freighter Viva in the Arabian Sea.
- 12 February 1944: The U-boat refuelling oiler Charlotte Schliemann scuttled when stopped by Relentless acting on Ultra. Japanese submarine I-27 sank the troopship Khedive Ismail drowning 1,279 passengers. HMS Petard then sank I-27.
- 14 February 1944: HMS Tally-Ho sank the German submarine UIT-23 in the Strait of Malacca. U-168 sank the tug HMS Salviking south of India.
- 15 February 1944: U-168 sank the freighter Epaminondas C. Embiricos south of India.
- 18 February 1944: HMS Trespasser sank Eifuku Maru off Burma.
- 22 February 1944: U-510 sank the tankers San Alvaro, Erling Brøvig and E.G. Seubert from convoy PA 69 in the Gulf of Aden.
- 29 February 1944: U-183 sank the freighter Palma south of Ceylon.
- 7 March 1944: U-510 sank the freighter Tarifa in the Arabian Sea.
- 9 March 1944: Japanese cruiser Tone sank the steamship Behar. U-183 sank the tanker British Loyalty in the Maldives.
- 10 March 1944: HMAS Ipswich and Launceston with HMIS Jumna sank Japanese submarine RO-110.
- 13 March 1944: The U-boat refuelling oiler Brake scuttled when found by aircraft from HMS Battler acting on Ultra. Japanese submarine I-26 sank the tanker H.D. Collier.
- 19 March 1944: U-510 sank the Liberty ship John A. Poor in the Arabian Sea.
- 27 March 1944: U-510 sank the naval trawler Maaløy in the Laccadive Sea. U-532 sank the freighter Tulagi in the central Indian Ocean.
- 29 March 1944: Japanese submarine I-26 sank the Liberty ship Richard Hovey.
- 19 April 1944: Operation Cockpit air raid against northern Sumatra by HMS Illustrious and USS Saratoga.
- 2 May 1944: U-852 was sunk off Somalia by No. 8 Squadron RAF and No. 621 Squadron RAF Vickers Wellingtons.
- 3 May 1944: HMS Tantalus sank Amagi Maru off Port Blair.
- 17 May 1944: Operation Transom air raid against Surabaya by HMS Illustrious and USS Saratoga.
- 5 June 1944: U-183 sank the freighter Helen Moller in the central Indian Ocean.
- 19 June 1944: Operation Pedal air raid against Port Blair by HMS Illustrious and Atheling. U-181 sank the freighter Garoet east of Madagascar.
- 9 July 1944: U-196 sank the freighter Shahzada in the Arabian Sea.
- 15 July 1944: U-181 sank the freighter Tanda in the Arabian Sea, and U-198 sank the freighter Director in the Mozambique Channel.
- 17 July 1944: HMS Telemachus sank Japanese submarine I-166 in the Strait of Malacca.
- 19 July 1944: U-181 sank the freighter King Frederick in the Arabian Sea.
- 23 July 1944: HMS Storm sank Kiso Maru.
- 25 July 1944: Operation Crimson air raid against northern Sumatra by HMS Illustrious and Victorious.
- 6 August 1944: U-198 sank the freighter Empire City in the Mozambique Channel.
- 7 August 1944: U-198 sank the freighter Empire Day in the Mozambique Channel.
- 12 August 1944: Allied aircraft and warships sank U-198 north of Madagascar.
- 13 August 1944: U-862 sank the freighter Radbury in the Mozambique Channel.
- 16 August 1944: U-862 sank the freighter Empire Lancer in the Mozambique Channel.
- 18 August 1944: U-862 sank the freighter Nairung in the Mozambique Channel.
- 19 August 1944: U-862 sank the freighter Wayfarer in the Mozambique Channel.
- 20 August 1944: U-861 sank the freighter Berwickshire east of South Africa.
- 22 August 1944: HMS Spiteful shelled Christmas Island.
- 24 August 1944: Operation Banquet air raid against Padang by HMS Indomitable and Victorious.
- 28 August 1944: U-859 sank the Liberty ship John Barry in the Arabian Sea.
- 1 September 1944: U-859 sank the freighter Troilus in the Arabian Sea.
- 5 September 1944: U-861 sank the freighter Toannis Fafalios north of Madagascar.
- 10 September 1944: Royal Air Force Beaufighters sank Misago Maru in the Andaman Sea.
- 23 September 1944: HMS Trenchant sank U-859 off Penang.
- 17 October 1944: Operation Millet raid against Port Blair by HMS Indomitable and Victorious.
- 2 November 1944: HMS Shalimar shelled Port Blair. U-181 sank the tanker Fort Lee in the central Indian Ocean. Allied aircraft sank Tatayama Maru in the Andaman Sea.
- 18 November 1944: Operation Outflank air raid against northern Sumatra by HMS Indomitable and Illustrious.
- 22 November 1944: HMS Stratagem was sunk by Japanese destroyers in the Strait of Malacca.
- 17 December 1944: Operation Robson air raid against northern Sumatra by HMS Indomitable and Illustrious.
- 31 December 1944: HMS Shakespeare sank Unryu Maru off Port Blair.

=== 1945 ===
Allied focus was on amphibious operations along the Burma coast of the Andaman Sea. Axis submarine operations were restricted by fuel shortage and maintenance difficulties.

- 3 January 1945: Operation Lightning Allied invasion of Akyab.
- 4 January 1945: Operation Lentil air raid against Sumatran oil refineries by HMS Victorious,Indomitable and Indefatigable.
- 12 January 1945: Allied amphibious landing near Myebon.
- 22 January 1945: Operation Matador Allied invasion of Kangaw.
- 24 January 1945: Operation Meridian air raid against Sumatran oil refineries by Illustrious, Victorious, Indomitable and Indefatigable.
- 26 January 1945: Operation Sankey Allied invasion of Cheduba Island.
- 30 January 1945: Operation Crocodile Allied invasion of Sagu Island.
- 6 February 1945: German submarine U-862 sank the Liberty ship Peter Silvester west of Australia.
- 7 February 1945: HMS Subtle sank Nanei Maru in the Andaman Sea.
- 11 February 1945: HMS Pathfinder was knocked out of action by Japanese aircraft off Akyab.
- 16 February 1945: Allied invasion of Ruywa, Burma.
- 22 February 1945: Allied amphibious landing on the Myebon River.
- 24 February 1945: Operation Stacy air raid against Andaman Sea shipping by HMS Ameer and Empress.
- 8 March 1945: Tenth Air Force B-24 Liberators sank Hoyo Maru in the Andaman Sea.
- 17 March 1945: HMS Saumarez, Rapid and Volage shelled Sigli.
- 19 March 1945: HMS Saumarez, Rapid and Volage shelled Port Blair.
- 26 March 1945: The Royal Navy 26th Destroyer Flotilla sank Risui Maru and Teshio Maru in the Andaman Sea.
- 11 April 1945: Operation Sunfish air raid against Port Blair by Khedive and HMS Emperor to cover shelling of northern Sumatra. No. 203 Squadron RAF B-24 Liberators sank Agata Maru in the Andaman Sea.
- 30 April 1945: Operation Dracula covering force destroyed a 9-ship Japanese convoy encountered en route.
- 1 May 1945: Operation Dracula amphibious landing near Rangoon.
- 6 May 1945: HMS Queen Elizabeth and Richelieu shelled Port Blair in Operation Bishop.
- 16 May 1945: The Royal Navy 26th Destroyer Flotilla sank the cruiser Haguro in the Battle of the Malacca Strait.
- 19 May 1945: HMS Terrapin was damaged by Japanese convoy escorts.
- 5 June 1945: The Royal Navy 10th Destroyer Flotilla sank the Kuroshio Maru evacuating troops from Port Blair.
- 20 June 1945: Operation Balsam air raid against northern Sumatra by Stalker, Ameer and Khedive.
- 5 July 1945: Air raid against northern Sumatra by HMS Ameer and Emperor to cover Operation Collie minesweeping of the Andaman and Nicobar Islands.
- 26 July 1945: The first Indian Ocean kamikaze strike sank HMS Vestal and damaged HMS Ameer during Operation Livery.

== List of sub-theatres and actions ==
Australia

- Axis naval activity in Australian waters
  - Western Australian emergency of March 1944
- Air raids on Australia, 1942–43

Britain

- Cocos Islands Mutiny

France

- Battle of La Réunion
- Battle of Madagascar

Germany

- Monsun Gruppe
- German auxiliary cruisers

Japan

- Japanese occupation of the Andaman Islands
  - Homfreyganj massacre
- Battle of Christmas Island
- Japanese raiders in the Indian Ocean Campaign
  - Indian Ocean raid (1942)
    - Easter Sunday Raid
  - Indian Ocean raid (1944)

== Sources ==
- Black, Jeremy (2009). "Midway and the Indian Ocean". Naval War College Review. 62 (4).
- Blair, Clay (1998). Hitler's U-Boat War:The Hunted 1942–1945. New York: Random House. ISBN 0-679-45742-9.
- Brice, Martin (1981). Axis Blockade Runners of World War II. Annapolis, Maryland: Naval Institute Press. ISBN 0-87021-908-1.
- Brown, David (1977). Aircraft Carriers. New York: Arco Publishing Company. ISBN 0-668-04164-1.
- Brown, David (1990). Warship Losses of World War II. Annapolis, Maryland: Naval Institute Press. ISBN 1-55750-914-X.
- Cressman, Robert J. (2000). The Official Chronology of the U.S. Navy in World War II. Annapolis, Maryland: Naval Institute Press. ISBN 1-55750-149-1.
- Dull, Paul S. (1978). A Battle History of the Imperial Japanese Navy (1941–1945). Annapolis, Maryland: Naval Institute Press.
- Heine, Paul; Royal, John; Sileo, Thomas; Soubermann, Eugene; Visser, H. (2015). "Question 11/51: British Commando Raid on Portuguese Goa". Warship International. LII (2): 114–116. ISSN 0043-0374.
- Kemp, P.K. (1957). Victory at Sea 1939–1945. London: Frederick Muller Ltd.
- Muggenthaler, August Karl (1977). German Raiders of World War II. Englewood Cliffs, New Jersey: Prentice-Hall. ISBN 0-13-354027-8.
- Rohwer, Jürgen; Hummelchen, Gerhard (1992). Chronology of the War at Sea 1939–1945. Annapolis, Maryland: Naval Institute Press. ISBN 1-55750-105-X.
- Hackett, Bob; Kingsepp, Sander (March 18, 2017). "IJN Submarine I-10: Tabular Record of Movement". combined fleet.com. Retrieved 02 May 2026.

== See also ==
- Pacific Theater aircraft carrier operations during World War II
