= Robert Bartels =

German navy officer and world war II U-boat commander (1911–1943)

- Born: 28 April 1911; Kiel-Pries, Schleswig-Holstein, German Empire
- Died: 20 August 1943 (aged 32); Indian Ocean
- Military career
- Allegiance: Nazi Germany
- Branch: Kriegsmarine
- Service years: 1935–43
- Rank: Korvettenkapitän
- Commands: U-139; U-561; U-197
- Conflicts: World War II
- Awards: U-boat War Badge 1939, German Cross in Gold, Bronze Medal of Military Valor

Robert Bartels (28 April 1911 – 20 August 1943) was a German U-boat commander in World War II.

== Naval career ==
Robert Bartels joined the Reichsmarine in 1935. From 1937 to June 1940, he served as a watch officer on U-21. He went through U-boat familiarisation in July 1940 in preparation for his own command. On 24 July 1940 Bartels commissioned the new Type IID U-139. He left the boat on 20 December 1940. From there he went to the 1st U-boat Flotilla and another U-boat familiarisation, this time in order to prepare for his command of the larger Type VIIC boat, U-561 on 13 March 1941. With this vessel Bartels went out on his first war patrol on 25 May 1941, a 69-day patrol where he sank one small ship. When he left the boat on 5 September 1942 after eight patrols he had sunk or destroyed five ships for over 21,000 tons and damaged another - the last three ships fell to mines laid by U-561. Bartels went through his third U-boat familiarisation in September and October 1942 in order to prepare for the much larger Type IXD2 boats. These vessels were very long range and were later converted for transport use. Bartels commissioned the new U-197 on 10 October 1942.

== Death ==
The day before its loss, U-197 had met with Wolfgang Lüth's U-181 where Bartels told Lüth he intended to stay in this area and hunt the traffic Lüth had told him about. Their radio chatter had allowed the Allies to pinpoint the location, finding Bartels' boat the next day. On 20 August 1943 U-197 was attacked south of Madagascar, in position 28°40′S 42°36′E, by a British PBY Catalina aircraft, C of No. 259 Squadron RAF, with six depth charges and slightly damaged. As the aircraft had no more bombs, it attempted to strafe with her machine guns, but the U-boat responded with AA fire. The aircraft then circled the U-boat at a safe distance and radioed for assistance. The U-boat remained on the surface, perhaps assuming that any support was unlikely, and that the aircraft would eventually have to abandon her vigil. Unfortunately for the German submarine, another Catalina, FP 313 of 265 Squadron, arrived. U-197 promptly crash-dived, and the aircraft dropped three depth charges, two of which detonated to port of the U-boat, but the third hit her squarely, killing all 67 hands. The pilot, captain Ernest Robin, received the Distinguished Flying Cross for the sinking of the vessel.

Eitel-Friedrich Kentrat, commander of U-196, was severely criticised by the Befehlshaber der U-Boote (BdU) [U-boat headquarters] for his lack of support for U-197. Bartels of U-197 had radioed a distress signal. The correct response by any boat in the vicinity, according to orders, would have been to assist at top speed. The BdU twice ordered U-196 to aid U-197 before Kentrat responded, and by that time U-197 and the entire crew were lost.

=== Ships attacked ===
Date	U-boat	Name of ship	Nationality	Tonnage	Fate
28 July 1941	U-561	Wrotham	United Kingdom	1,884	Sunk
11 November 1941	U-561	Meridian	Panama	5,592	Sunk
14 November 1941	U-561	Crusader	Panama	2,939	Sunk
14 May 1942	U-561	Fred	Greece	4,043	Damaged
14 May 1942	U-561	Hav	Norway	5,062	Sunk
14 May 1942	U-561	Mount Olympus	Greece	6,692	Sunk
20 May 1943	U-197	Benakat	Netherlands	4,763	Sunk
24 July 1943	U-197	Pegasus	Sweden	9,583	Sunk
30 July 1943	U-197	William Ellery	United States	7,181	Damaged
17 August 1943	U-197	Empire Stanley	United Kingdom	6,921	Sunk

== See also ==
- List of people who disappeared mysteriously at sea

== Awards ==
- German Cross in Gold on 28 August 1942 as Kapitänleutnant on U-561 in the 29th U-boat Flotilla
