= Wolfgang Lüth =

German naval officer and U-boat commander during World War II

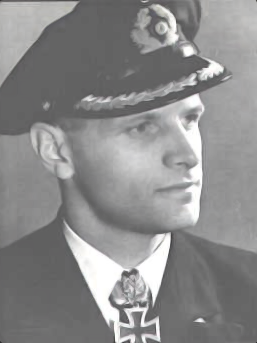
- Lüth during World War II
- Born: 15 October 1913; Riga, Russian Empire (now Latvia)
- Died: 14 May 1945 (aged 31); Flensburg-Mürwik, Nazi Germany
- Burial place: Cemetery Adelby in Flensburg
- Military career
- Allegiance: Nazi Germany
- Branch: Kriegsmarine
- Service years: 1933–45
- Rank: Kapitän zur See
- Units: 1st U-boat Flotilla; 6th U-boat Flotilla; 12th U-boat Flotilla; 22nd U-boat Flotilla
- Commands: U-13, U-9, U-138, U-43, U-181; 22nd U-boat Flotilla; Naval Academy Mürwik
- Conflicts: Spanish Civil War; World War II: Atlantic War
- Awards: Spanish Cross; Knight's Cross of the Iron Cross with Oak Leaves, Swords and Diamonds; Croce di Guerra (Italy)

Wolfgang Lüth (15 October 1913 – 14 May 1945) was a German U-boat captain of World War II who was credited with the sinking of 46 merchant ships plus the French submarine Doris sunk during 15 war patrols, for a total tonnage of 225,204 gross register tons (GRT).

Lüth joined the Reichsmarine in 1933. After a period of training on surface vessels, he transferred to the U-boat service in 1936. In December 1939 he received command of U-9, which he took on six war-patrols. In June 1940 he took command of U-138 for two patrols. In October 1940 he transferred again, this time to the ocean-going submarine U-43 for five war-patrols. After two patrols on U-181, the second being his longest of the war, he was awarded the Knight's Cross of the Iron Cross with Oak Leaves, Swords and Diamonds. He was the first of two U-boat commanders to be so honored during World War II, the other recipient being Albrecht Brandi.

Lüth's last service position was commander of the Naval Academy Mürwik near Flensburg. He was accidentally shot and killed by a German sentry after the end of the war on the night of 13/14 May 1945. On 16 May 1945, Lüth was given a state funeral by the Flensburg Government.

== Early life and career ==
Lüth was a Baltic German born in Riga, then part of the Russian Empire. He went to the Naturwissenschaftliches Gymnasium there and after he had received his Abitur (certificate), he studied law for three semesters at the Herder-Institut. With his parents' approval he left Latvia to join the German Reichsmarine (renamed Kriegsmarine in 1935) on 1 April 1933 as an officer candidate. After he underwent basic military training, he was transferred to the training ship Gorch Fock attaining the rank of Seekadett (naval cadet) on 23 September 1933. He initially served with the surface fleet, going on a nine-month training tour around the world in the cruiser Karlsruhe from 24 September 1933 to 27 June 1934. He advanced in rank to Fähnrich zur See (midshipman) on 1 July 1934 and served for a year aboard the light cruiser Königsberg (22 March 1936 – 31 January 1937), attaining the rank of Oberfähnrich zur See (senior midshipman) on 1 April 1936 and Leutnant zur See (ensign) on 1 October 1936.

In February 1937 he transferred to the U-boat Arm and was promoted to Oberleutnant zur See (lieutenant) on 1 June 1938. In July he was appointed 2nd Watch Officer of U-27 (3 July 1938 – 23 October 1938). He sailed on a patrol in Spanish waters during the civil war in that country on the U-boat tender Erwin Wassner (13 April 1939 – 18 May 1939). In October he was appointed the 1st Watch Officer of U-38 under the command of Kapitänleutnant (Lieutenant) Heinrich Liebe, who during the course of World War II would earn the Knight's Cross of the Iron Cross with Oak Leaves. When war broke out, Lüth was on patrol with U-38 which had left Wilhelmshaven on 19 August 1939 and patrolled the Western Approaches until returning to base on 18 September 1939.

== Boats under his command ==
=== U-9 ===
On 30 December 1939 Lüth took command of U-9, a Type IIB U-boat. He went on six patrols with this boat, achieving steady success. In January 1940, U-9 sank the Swedish merchantman Flandria, following the premature ignition of a smoke float. This surface attack was carried out while U-9's bridge was filled with onlooking crew members. Other sinkings included the surfaced French submarine Doris during the night of 8–9 May 1940 and seven merchant ships with a total of 16,669 gross register tons (GRT). An attack on ORP Błyskawica on 20 April 1940, however, was unsuccessful as the torpedoes malfunctioned and detonated in the wake of the destroyer.

=== U-138 ===
On 27 June 1940 Lüth took command of U-138, a Type IID submarine, with which he sank four ships on his first patrol, totalling 34,644 GRT. In October, U-138 returned from his second patrol, during which it fired a torpedo at (but missed) the Norwegian merchant steamer SS Dagrun (4,562 GRT), sank the British merchant steamer SS Bonheur (5,327 GRT) and damaged the British motor tanker British Glory (6,993 GRT). Initially, the German authorities believed that British Glory had been sunk and Lüth was nominated for the Knight's Cross of the Iron Cross, which he was awarded on 24 October 1940. In the radio announcement, Lüth was credited with sinking 12 ships and one submarine of 87,236 tons, when in reality sunken tonnage added up to only 51,316 GRT by the end of September, rising to 56,643 GRT on 15 October 1940.

=== U-43 ===
For his achievements, Lüth was given command of a new boat, and on 21 October 1940 Lüth took command of U-43, a long range Type IX U-boat. After twice aborting the first patrol due to mechanical failures, he carried out five patrols with this boat, totaling 204 days at sea, sinking 12 ships adding up to 64,852 GRT. On 1 January 1941 he was promoted to Kapitänleutnant. Lüth, because of his experience–like many other top commanders–was tasked with training future U-boat commanders, including Erich Würdemann. These trainees often came along on single war-patrols, which would be their last exercise before they received their own command.

U-43 was due to depart Lorient on a war patrol to an area off Freetown, West Africa, but early on 4 February 1941, she sank while tied to Ysere, an old sailing ship (which had carried the Statue of Liberty to New York in 1885) which was used as a floating pier. Valves and vents had been tampered-with the previous day, but no one had noticed the slow, but steady ingress of water into the bilges. To make matters worse and contrary to a Befehlshaber der U-Boote (BdU—U-boat command headquarters) directive, a hatch had been left open, allowing water to pour into the aft torpedo room. Two petty officers were found to be most at fault; but Lüth, as captain, was ultimately responsible. However, according to author Jordan Vause, no record of punishment seems to have survived and Lüth's career does not appear to have been affected. U-43 was refloated and Lüth took it back out into the North Atlantic in May 1941.

=== U-181 ===
In January 1942, upon the completion of another patrol, Lüth was ordered to bring U-43 back to Germany for an overhaul. On 9 May 1942 Lüth was given command of a long-range Type IXD-2 U-boat, U-181. He left on his first patrol in September 1942, departing from Kiel for the Indian Ocean and waters off South Africa. In October he reached the sea lanes outside Cape Town and spent a month patrolling the area. On 13 November 1942, while still at sea, Lüth received a signal stating that he had been awarded the Knight's Cross of the Iron Cross with Oak Leaves.

Two days later, U-181 was heavily damaged by the British destroyer Inconstant in an engagement that lasted nine hours before Lüth was able to escape. After repairing his vessel, Lüth led it to Lourenco Marques and for the next fortnight U-181 undertook a series of surface attacks which resulted in eight ships being sunk, most primarily with U-181's deck gun. In January 1943, after sinking 12 ships for 58,381 GRT, U-181 returned to Bordeaux in France, in January 1943. On 31 January 1943, Lüth and other Kriegsmarine officers traveled to the Wolf's Lair, Hitler's headquarters at Rastenburg, present-day Kętrzyn in Poland, for the Oak Leaves presentation. Following the presentation, Hitler met with Dönitz and Vizeadmiral Theodor Krancke in private. During this meeting, Hitler appointed Dönitz as Oberbefehlshaber der Marine (Commander-in-Chief) of the Kriegsmarine following Raeder's resignation on 30 January 1943. On the return flight to Berlin, Dönitz informed Lüth and the other officers present of this change in command.

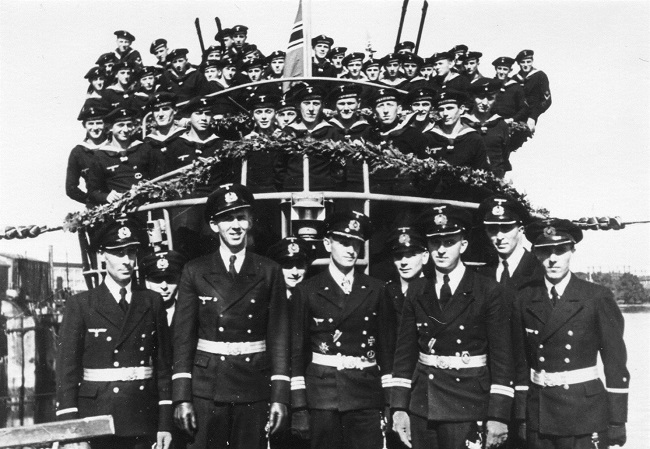
Lüth (front row, center) at the commissioning of German submarine U-1305, as guest of honor

In March 1943 Lüth set out for a second patrol off South Africa and in the Indian Ocean, in particular the waters around Mauritius. This patrol lasted 205 days (23 March 1943 – 14 October 1943) making it the second longest of the war. (The longest combat patrol of World War II was 225 days in length, which was achieved by Eitel-Friedrich Kentrat as commander of the U-196.) Lüth sank 10 ships totaling 45,331 GRT on this patrol, which turned out to be his last. While at sea he was promoted to Korvettenkapitän on 1 April 1943. Later that month, he received news that he had been awarded the Knight's Cross of the Iron Cross with Oak Leaves and Swords.

After carrying out a patrol between Lourenco Marques and Durban, during which U-181 sank three more ships. U-181 rendezvoused with the supply ship Charlotte Schliemann east of Mauritius to refuel on 21 June. Also present were U-177, under the command of Robert Gysae, U-178 (Wilhelm Dommes), U-196 (Eitel-Friedrich Kentrat), U-197 (Robert Bartels) and U-198 (Werner Hartmann). The commanders exchanged experiences and discussed the problem of torpedo failures. In July, Lüth led his boat west towards Madagascar, before being ordered back to Mauritius. On 15 July 1943, Lüth sunk the British collier Empire Lake and noted in his logbook: "Five men have been left floating on a piece of wreckage. Due to the high sea and 180-mile distance from land they will probably not be saved."

On 9 August 1943, while still on patrol, Lüth was awarded the Knight's Cross of the Iron Cross with Oak Leaves, Swords and Diamonds. In addition, Lüth nominated two crew members of U-181 for the Knight's Cross of the Iron Cross after this patrol. The chief engineer Kapitänleutnant Carl-August Landfermann and 2nd Watch Officer Johannes Limbach both received the Knight's Cross for their achievements.

== Ashore and death ==
After five years of operational U-boat service, including 15 war-patrols and over 600 days at sea, Lüth took command of 22nd U-boat Flotilla stationed at Gotenhafen in January 1944. This was a training unit for U-boat commanders. In July 1944 he took command of the 1st Department of the Naval Academy Mürwik in Flensburg. He was promoted to Fregattenkapitän (commander) on 1 August 1944 and became the commander of the entire academy in September. He was promoted to Kapitän zur See (captain) on 1 September 1944.

Lüth's funeral; Grand Admiral and Reichspräsident Karl Dönitz on the far right delivering the eulogy

The British forces occupied Flensburg on 5 May 1945; initially, nothing changed in the daily routine at the Mürwik Naval Academy. Returning drunk in the night of 13/14 May 1945, Lüth failed to respond to the sentry's challenge and was shot in the head by 18-year-old seaman Mathias Gottlob, a German guard. The officer in charge immediately reported the incident, contacting Grand Admiral and Reichspräsident Karl Dönitz. Dönitz's adjutant, who had accepted the call, initially thought that it was a bad joke. He then called Lüth's brother, Joachim, as the two siblings had been staying together. It was he who informed Lüth's wife and their four children that Lüth had died.

Dönitz contacted the British commander of the city of Flensburg, asking him for permission to conduct a formal state funeral, which was approved by royal assent. The funeral was held on 16 May 1945 with Dönitz, Adolf Hitler's designated successor serving as Reichspräsident, delivering the eulogy. In advance, Dönitz had ordered a board of inquiry and court martial to clarify the circumstances of the shooting. During the court martial, Gottlob stated that, in accordance with his orders, he had asked for the password three times without receiving a response from the person, whom he could not visually identify in the darkness. Without aiming he had fired his rifle from the hip. The chain of events was confirmed by the watch leader. The court ruled that Gottlob was not guilty and cleared him of any fault.

== In popular culture ==
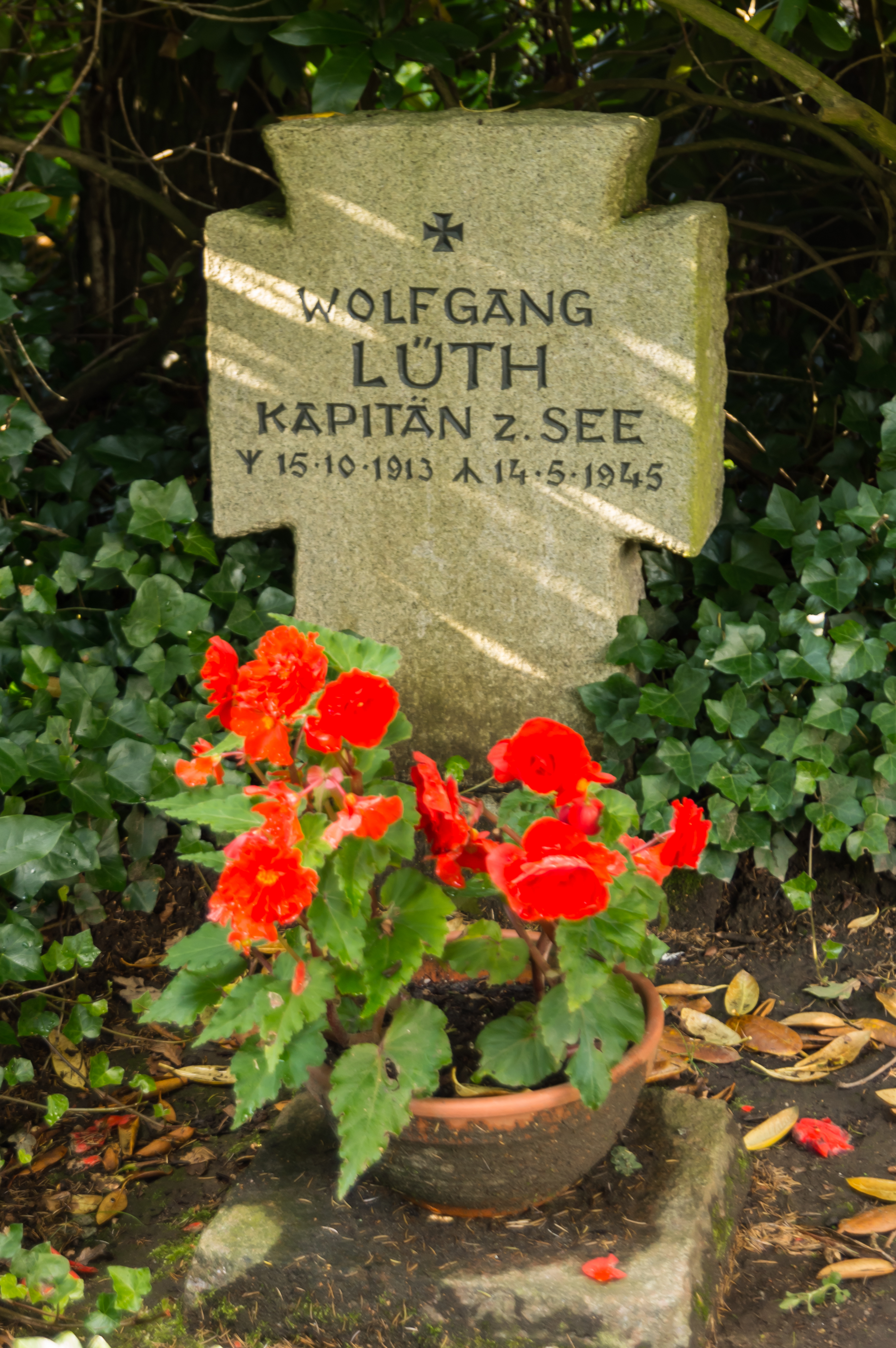
Lüth's grave, cemetery Adelby

Lüth was the subject of a hagiographic account by the German author Franz Kurowski, published in 1988 under the pen name Karl Alman, commemorating "the most successful U-boat commandant of the Second World War" (according to the subtitle). According to Canadian historian Michael Hadley, Kurowski, by his own admission, used his birth name for "more serious work", and typically used pseudonyms for works of fiction. In his 1995 book Count Not the Dead: The Popular Image of the German Submarine, Hadley panned Kurowski's works as "hackwork" and "pulp-trade yarn" focused on hero making.

== Summary of career ==
During his career Lüth sank 46 commercial ships for 225,204 GRT, one warship of 552 GRT, and damaged two ships for 17,343 GRT.

=== Awards ===
- Spanish Cross in Bronze (6 June 1939)
- The Return of Sudetenland Commemorative Medal of 1 October 1938 (16 September 1939)
- U-boat Front Clasp (12 October 1944)
- U-boat War Badge with Diamonds (26 January 1943)
- Croce di Guerra Italiana al valor militare (1 November 1941)
- Iron Cross (1939)
  - 2nd Class (25 January 1940)
  - 1st Class (15 May 1940)
- Gauehrenabzeichen des Reichgaues Wartheland (24 October 1943)
- Knight's Cross of the Iron Cross with Oak Leaves, Swords and Diamonds
  - Knight's Cross (24 October 1940) as Oberleutnant zur See and commander of U-138
  - 142nd Oak Leaves (13 November 1942) as Kapitänleutnant and commander of U-181 (Note: According to Von Seemen as commander of U-43.)
  - 29th Swords (15 April 1943) as Kapitänleutnant and commander of U-181
  - 7th Diamonds (9 August 1943) as Korvettenkapitän and commander of U-181

=== Promotions ===
23 September 1933:	Seekadett (Officer Cadet)
1 July 1934:	Fähnrich zur See (Midshipman)
1 April 1936:	Oberfähnrich zur See (Senior Midshipman)
1 October 1936:	Leutnant zur See (Ensign)
1 June 1938:	Oberleutnant zur See (Sublieutenant)
1 January 1941:	Kapitänleutnant (Captain Lieutenant)
1 April 1943:	Korvettenkapitän (Corvette Captain)
1 August 1944:	Fregattenkapitän (Frigate Captain)
1 September 1944:	Kapitän zur See (Captain at Sea)

== Notes ==
Military offices
Preceded by Kapitänleutnant Heinz Scheringer	Commander of U-13; 16 December 1939 – 28 December 1939	Succeeded by Kapitänleutnant Max-Martin Schulte
Preceded by Oberleutnant zur See Max-Martin Schulte	Commander of U-9; 30 December 1939 – 10 June 1940	Succeeded by Oberleutnant zur See Wolfgang Kaufmann
Preceded by Commissioned	Commander of U-138; 27 June 1940 – 20 October 1940	Succeeded by Kapitänleutnant Peter Lohmeyer
Preceded by Kapitänleutnant Wilhelm Ambrosius	Commander of U-43; 21 October 1940 – 11 April 1942	Succeeded by Oberleutnant zur See Hans-Joachim Schwantke
Preceded by Commissioned	Commander of U-181; 9 May 1942 – 31 October 1943	Succeeded by Fregattenkapitän Kurt Freiwald
Preceded by Korvettenkapitän Wilhelm Ambrosius	Commander of 22nd U-boat Flotilla; 15 January 1944 – 16 July 1944	Succeeded by Korvettenkapitän Heinrich Bleichrodt
Preceded by unknown	Commander of 1st Department (I. Abteilung) of the Naval Academy Mürwik; 17 July 1944 – 17 September 1944	Succeeded by unknown
Preceded by Konteradmiral Waldemar Winther	Commander of Naval Academy Mürwik; 18 September 1944 – 13 May 1945	Succeeded by none
