= German submarine U-561 =

German World War II submarine

History

Nazi Germany
- Name: U-561
- Ordered: 16 October 1939
- Builder: Blohm & Voss, Hamburg
- Yard number: 537
- Laid down: 28 February 1940
- Launched: 23 January 1941
- Commissioned: 13 March 1941
- Fate: Sunk on 12 July 1943

General characteristics
- Class & type: Type VIIC submarine
- Displacement: 769 tonnes (757 long tons) surfaced; 871 t (857 long tons) submerged
- Length: 67.10 m (220 ft 2 in) o/a; 50.50 m (165 ft 8 in) pressure hull
- Beam: 6.20 m (20 ft 4 in) o/a; 4.70 m (15 ft 5 in) pressure hull
- Height: 9.60 m (31 ft 6 in)
- Draught: 4.74 m (15 ft 7 in)
- Installed power: 2,800–3,200 PS (2,100–2,400 kW; 2,800–3,200 bhp) (diesels); 750 PS (550 kW; 740 shp) (electric)
- Propulsion: 2 shafts; 2 × diesel engines; 2 × electric motors
- Speed: 17.7 knots (32.8 km/h; 20.4 mph) surfaced; 7.6 knots (14.1 km/h; 8.7 mph) submerged
- Range: 8,500 nmi (15,700 km; 9,800 mi) at 10 knots (19 km/h; 12 mph) surfaced; 80 nmi (150 km; 92 mi) at 4 knots (7.4 km/h; 4.6 mph) submerged
- Test depth: 230 m (750 ft); Crush depth: 250–295 m (820–968 ft)
- Complement: 4 officers, 40–56 enlisted
- Armament: 5 × 53.3 cm (21 in) torpedo tubes (four bow, one stern); 14 × torpedoes or 26 TMA mines; 1 × 8.8 cm (3.46 in) deck gun (220 rounds); 1 x 2 cm (0.79 in) C/30 AA gun

Service record
- Part of: 1st U-boat Flotilla; 13 March – 31 January 1942; 23rd U-boat Flotilla; 1 February – 12 July 1943
- Identification codes: M 40 727
- Commanders: Kptlt. Robert Bartels; 13 March 1941 – 5 September 1942; Kptlt. Heinz Schomburg; 5 September 1942 – 18 June 1943; Oblt.z.S. Fritz Henning; 19 June – 12 July 1943
- Operations: 15 patrols: 1st patrol: 25 May – 1 August 1941; 2nd patrol: 20 August – 20 September 1941; 3rd patrol: 1 – 26 November 1941; 4th patrol: 3 – 22 January 1942; 5th patrol: 26 January – 20 February 1942; 6th patrol: 4 April – 5 May 1942; 7th patrol: 11 – 25 June 1942; 8th patrol: a. 2 – 24 July 1942; b. 9 – 11 September 1942; 9th patrol: 12 September – 4 October 1942; 10th patrol: 7 – 14 November 1942; 11th patrol: 25 November – 18 December 1942; 12th patrol: 23 December 1942 – 15 January 1943; 13th patrol: 11 – 28 March 1943; 14th patrol: 22 April – 3 June 1943; 15th patrol: 10 – 12 July 1943
- Victories: 5 merchant ships sunk (17,146 GRT); 1 merchant ship total loss (5,062 GRT); 1 merchant ship damaged (4,043 GRT)

German submarine U-561 was a Type VIIC U-boat built for Nazi Germany's Kriegsmarine for service during World War II. She was laid down on 28 February 1940 by Blohm & Voss in Hamburg as yard number 537, launched on 23 January 1941 and commissioned on 13 March 1941 under Kapitänleutnant Robert Bartels.

== Design ==
German Type VIIC submarines were preceded by the shorter Type VIIB submarines. U-561 had a displacement of 769 tonnes (757 long tons) when at the surface and 871 tonnes (857 long tons) while submerged. She had a total length of 67.10 m (220 ft 2 in), a pressure hull length of 50.50 m (165 ft 8 in), a beam of 6.20 m (20 ft 4 in), a height of 9.60 m (31 ft 6 in), and a draught of 4.74 m (15 ft 7 in). The submarine was powered by two Germaniawerft F46 four-stroke, six-cylinder supercharged diesel engines producing a total of 2,800 to 3,200 metric horsepower (2,060 to 2,350 kW; 2,760 to 3,160 shp) for use while surfaced, two BBC GG UB 720/8 double-acting electric motors producing a total of 750 metric horsepower (550 kW; 740 shp) for use while submerged. She had two shafts and two 1.23 m (4 ft) propellers. The boat was capable of operating at depths of up to 230 metres (750 ft).

The submarine had a maximum surface speed of 17.7 knots (32.8 km/h; 20.4 mph) and a maximum submerged speed of 7.6 knots (14.1 km/h; 8.7 mph). When submerged, the boat could operate for 80 nautical miles (150 km; 92 mi) at 4 knots (7.4 km/h; 4.6 mph); when surfaced, she could travel 8,500 nautical miles (15,700 km; 9,800 mi) at 10 knots (19 km/h; 12 mph). U-561 was fitted with five 53.3 cm (21 in) torpedo tubes (four fitted at the bow and one at the stern), fourteen torpedoes, one 8.8 cm (3.46 in) SK C/35 naval gun, 220 rounds, and a 2 cm (0.79 in) C/30 anti-aircraft gun. The boat had a complement of between forty-four and sixty.

== Service history ==
The boat's service began on 13 March 1941 with training as part of the 1st U-boat Flotilla. During late July 1941, U-561, along with 9 other German and Italian submarines, attacked convoy OG 69 en route from Liverpool to Gibraltar. U-561 torpedoed and sank the 1,884 GRT British freighter Wrotham.

In November 1941, while travelling across the Atlantic ocean, she sunk two boats from convoy SC 53, the Meridian and the Cruisader.

She was transferred to the 23rd flotilla on 1 February 1942. In 15 patrols she sank five ships for a total of 17,146 gross register tons (GRT), plus one ship damaged and a second a total loss.

She was sunk by torpedoes fired from Royal Navy's HMS MTB-81 on 12 July 1943 at position 38°16′N 15°39′E in the Straits of Messina.

=== Wolfpacks ===
She took part in two wolfpacks, namely:

- Bosemüller (28 August – 2 September 1941)
- Seewolf (2 – 15 September 1941)

== Summary of raiding history ==
Date	Ship Name	Nationality	Tonnage (GRT)	Fate
28 July 1941	Wrotham	United Kingdom	1,884	Sunk
11 November 1941	Meridian	Panama	5,592	Sunk
14 November 1941	Crusader	Panama	2,939	Sunk
14 May 1942	Fred	Greece	4,043	Damaged (mine)
14 May 1942	Hav	Norway	5,062	Total loss (mine)
14 May 1942	Mount Olympus	Greece	6,692	Sunk (mine)
24 September 1942	Sphinx	Egypt	39	Sunk

== Bibliography ==
- Busch, Rainer; Röll, Hans-Joachim (1999). German U-boat commanders of World War II: a biographical dictionary. Translated by Brooks, Geoffrey. London, Annapolis, Md: Greenhill Books, Naval Institute Press. ISBN 1-55750-186-6.
- Busch, Rainer; Röll, Hans-Joachim (1999). Der U-Boot-Krieg, 1939-1945: Deutsche U-Boot-Verluste von September 1939 bis Mai 1945 [German U-boat losses from September 1939 to May 1945] (in German). Vol. IV. Hamburg, Berlin, Bonn: Mittler. ISBN 3-8132-0514-2.
- Gröner, Eric; Jung, Dieter; Maass, Martin (1991). German Warships 1815-1945: U-boats and Mine Warfare Vessels. Vol. 2. Translated by Thomas, Keith; Magowan, Rachel. London: Conway Maritime Press. ISBN 0-85177-593-4.
