= German submarine U-197 =

German World War II submarine

History

Nazi Germany
- Name: U-197
- Ordered: 4 November 1940
- Builder: DeSchiMAG AG Weser, Bremen
- Yard number: 1043
- Laid down: 5 July 1941
- Launched: 21 May 1942
- Commissioned: 10 October 1942
- Fate: Sunk, 20 August 1943

General characteristics
- Class & type: Type IXD2 submarine
- Displacement: 1,610 t (1,580 long tons) surfaced; 1,799 t (1,771 long tons) submerged
- Length: 87.58 m (287 ft 4 in) o/a; 68.50 m (224 ft 9 in) pressure hull
- Beam: 7.50 m (24 ft 7 in) o/a; 4.40 m (14 ft 5 in) pressure hull
- Height: 10.20 m (33 ft 6 in)
- Draught: 5.40 m (17 ft 9 in)
- Installed power: 9,000 PS (6,620 kW; 8,880 bhp) (diesels); 1,000 PS (740 kW; 990 shp) (electric)
- Propulsion: 2 shafts; 2 × diesel engines; 2 × electric motors
- Speed: 20.8 knots (38.5 km/h; 23.9 mph) surfaced; 6.9 knots (12.8 km/h; 7.9 mph) submerged
- Range: 12,750 nmi (23,610 km; 14,670 mi) at 10 knots (19 km/h; 12 mph) surfaced; 57 nmi (106 km; 66 mi) at 4 knots (7.4 km/h; 4.6 mph) submerged
- Test depth: 230 m (750 ft)
- Complement: 55 to 64
- Armament: 6 × torpedo tubes (four bow, two stern); 24 × 53.3 cm (21 in) torpedoes; 1 × 10.5 cm (4.1 in) SK C/32 deck gun (150 rounds); 1 × 3.7 cm (1.5 in) SK C/30; 2 × 2 cm (0.79 in) C/30 anti-aircraft guns

Service record
- Part of: 4th U-boat Flotilla; 10 October 1942 – 31 March 1943; 12th U-boat Flotilla; 1 April – 20 August 1943
- Identification codes: M 49 177
- Commanders: K.Kapt. Robert Bartels; 10 October 1942 – 20 August 1943
- Operations: 1 patrol: 3 April – 20 August 1943
- Victories: 3 merchant ships sunk (21,267 GRT); 1 merchant ship damaged (7,181 GRT)

German submarine U-197 was a Type IXD2 U-boat of Nazi Germany's Kriegsmarine during World War II. The submarine was laid down on 5 July 1941 at the DeSchiMAG AG Weser yard in Bremen as yard number 1043. She was launched on 21 May 1942, and commissioned on 10 October under the command of Korvettenkapitän Robert Bartels. After training with the 4th U-boat Flotilla at Stettin, U-197 was transferred to the 12th U-boat Flotilla for front-line service on 1 April 1943.

== Design ==
German Type IXD2 submarines were considerably larger than the original Type IXs. U-197 had a displacement of 1,610 tonnes (1,580 long tons) when at the surface and 1,799 tonnes (1,771 long tons) while submerged. The U-boat had a total length of 87.58 m (287 ft 4 in), a pressure hull length of 68.50 m (224 ft 9 in), a beam of 7.50 m (24 ft 7 in), a height of 10.20 m (33 ft 6 in), and a draught of 5.35 m (17 ft 7 in). The submarine was powered by two MAN M 9 V 40/46 supercharged four-stroke, nine-cylinder diesel engines plus two MWM RS34.5S six-cylinder four-stroke diesel engines for cruising, producing a total of 9,000 metric horsepower (6,620 kW; 8,880 shp) for use while surfaced, two Siemens-Schuckert 2 GU 345/34 double-acting electric motors producing a total of 1,000 shaft horsepower (1,010 PS; 750 kW) for use while submerged. She had two shafts and two 1.85 m (6 ft) propellers. The boat was capable of operating at depths of up to 200 metres (660 ft).

The submarine had a maximum surface speed of 20.8 knots (38.5 km/h; 23.9 mph) and a maximum submerged speed of 6.9 knots (12.8 km/h; 7.9 mph). When submerged, the boat could operate for 121 nautical miles (224 km; 139 mi) at 2 knots (3.7 km/h; 2.3 mph); when surfaced, she could travel 12,750 nautical miles (23,610 km; 14,670 mi) at 10 knots (19 km/h; 12 mph). U-197 was fitted with six 53.3 cm (21 in) torpedo tubes (four fitted at the bow and two at the stern), 24 torpedoes, one 10.5 cm (4.13 in) SK C/32 naval gun, 150 rounds, and a 3.7 cm (1.5 in) SK C/30 with 2575 rounds as well as two 2 cm (0.79 in) C/30 anti-aircraft guns with 8100 rounds. The boat had a complement of fifty-five.

== Service history ==
U-197 sailed from Kiel on 3 April 1943 on her first and only combat patrol, sailing around the Cape of Good Hope to the waters south of Madagascar.

On 20 May, while in the South Atlantic, north-east of Ascension Island, she torpedoed the 4,763 GRT Dutch tanker Benakat. After the crew of 44 men abandoned ship in three lifeboats a second torpedo broke the ship in two, and the bow section sank. The U-boat surfaced and sank the stern section with her deck gun.

She torpedoed the unescorted 9,583 GRT Swedish tanker Pegasus south-west of Madagascar on 24 July. The ship, loaded with 12,855 tons of gasoline, sank in flames. All 38 of her crew survived.

On 30 July, the unescorted 7,181 GRT American Liberty ship William Ellery was hit by a single torpedo about 300 nmi (560 km; 350 mi) east southeast of Durban. A second torpedo narrowly missed, and despite a 450-square-foot (42 m^{2}) hole in the port side, the ship escaped and arrived at Durban on 1 August under her own power.

The unescorted 6,921 GRT British merchant ship Empire Stanley was torpedoed and sunk south southeast of Cap Sainte Marie, Madagascar on 17 August. From the 54 men aboard, 25 lost their lives, while the 29 survivors were later picked up in two lifeboats.

=== Sinking ===
On 20 August 1943 U-197 was attacked south of Madagascar, in position 28°40′S 42°36′E, by a British PBY Catalina aircraft of No. 259 Squadron RAF piloted by Captain Lionel Oscar Barnett (receiving the DFC). The Catalina dropped six depth charges and used its front and port blister guns hitting the deck and conning tower, it was these gun strikes that proved decisive and stopped the submarine from diving as it listed with signs of oil streaks. The aircraft then circled the U-boat at a safe distance and radioed for assistance. The U-boat remained on the surface unable to dive. Another Catalina, FP 313 of 265 Squadron and piloted by captain Ernest Robin, (also receiving the DFC for the sinking of the vessel), arrived. U-197 crash-dived, and the aircraft dropped three depth charges, two of which detonated to port of the U-boat, but the third hit the U-boat, killing all 67 hands.

Eitel-Friedrich Kentrat, commander of U-196, was severely criticised by Befehlshaber der U-Boote (BdU) [U-boat headquarters] for his lack of support for U-197. Korvettenkapitän Robert Bartels of U-197 had radioed a distress signal. The correct response by any boat in the vicinity, according to orders, would have been to assist at top speed. The BdU twice ordered U-196 to aid U-197 before Kentrat responded, and by that time U-197 and the entire crew were lost.

== Summary of raiding history ==
Date	Name	Nationality	Tonnage (GRT)	Fate
20 May 1943	Benakat	Netherlands	4,763	Sunk
24 July 1943	Pegasus	Sweden	9,583	Sunk
30 July 1943	William Ellery	United States	7,181	Damaged
17 August 1943	Empire Stanley	United Kingdom	6,921	Sunk

== Bibliography ==
- Busch, Rainer; Röll, Hans-Joachim (1999). German U-boat commanders of World War II : a biographical dictionary. Translated by Brooks, Geoffrey. London, Annapolis, Md: Greenhill Books, Naval Institute Press. ISBN 1-55750-186-6.
- Busch, Rainer; Röll, Hans-Joachim (1999). Deutsche U-Boot-Verluste von September 1939 bis Mai 1945 [German U-boat losses from September 1939 to May 1945]. Der U-Boot-Krieg (in German). Vol. IV. Hamburg, Berlin, Bonn: Mittler. ISBN 3-8132-0514-2.
- Busch, Rainer; Röll, Hans-Joachim (2003). Die Ritterkreuzträger der U-Boot-Waffe von September 1939 bis Mai 1945. Der U-Boot-Krieg 1939-1945 (in German). Vol. V. Hamburg, Berlin, Bonn, Germany: Verlag E.S. Mittler & Sohn. ISBN 3-8132-0515-0.
- Gröner, Erich; Jung, Dieter; Maass, Martin (1991). U-boats and Mine Warfare Vessels. German Warships 1815–1945. Vol. 2. Translated by Thomas, Keith; Magowan, Rachel. London: Conway Maritime Press. ISBN 0-85177-593-4.
