= No. 265 Squadron RAF =

Defunct flying squadron of the Royal Air Force

- Active: August 1918 – Jan 1919; 11 March 1943 – 30 April 1945
- Country: United Kingdom
- Branch: Royal Air Force
- Role: anti-submarine squadron
- Part of: RAF Coastal Command

Insignia
- Squadron Badge: No badge authorised
- Squadron Codes: TR (1944); On at least one of the squadron's aircraft, but not known to be universal through the squadron)

No. 265 Squadron RAF was an anti-submarine squadron of the Royal Air Force during two world wars. It was based at Gibraltar in World War One and Madagascar in World War Two.

== History ==
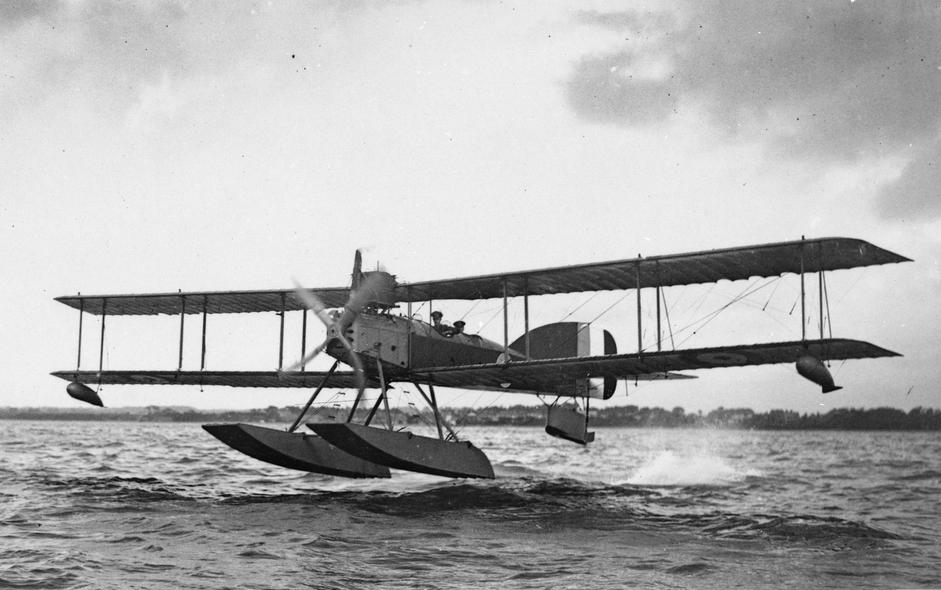
Short 184

=== Formation and World War I ===
The squadron was officially announced in August 1918 and was to be formed at Gibraltar from three former RNAS flights 364, 365, and 366 to perform anti-submarine patrols. There is no evidence that the squadron actually formed and this may have been because of the war ending on 11 November. Sources say it was either officially disbanded in January 1919 or abandoned.

=== World War II ===
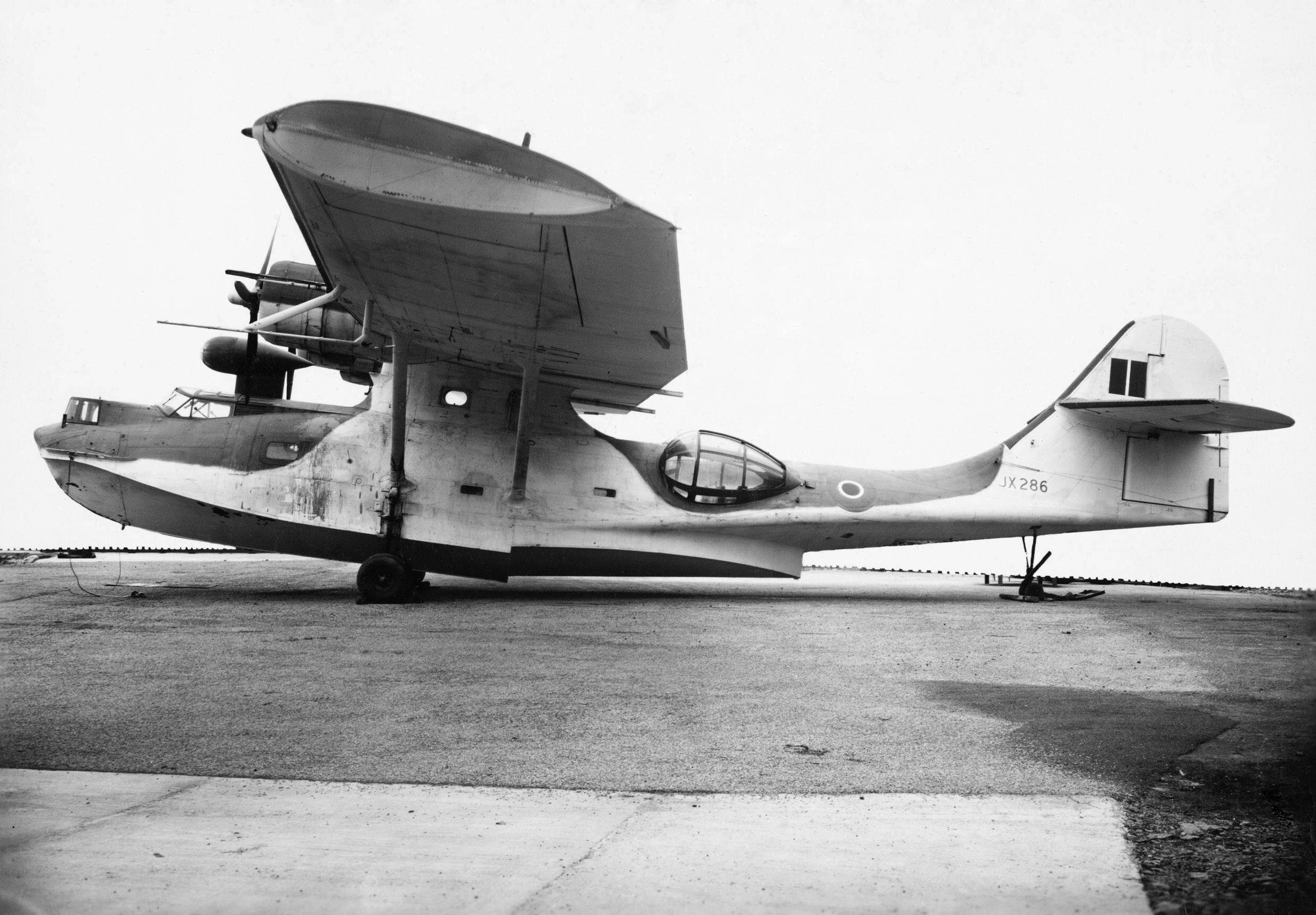
Catalina similar to those used by 265 Squadron

On 11 March 1943 the squadron was officially reformed at Mombasa (probably at RAF Port Reitz, now the city's Moi International Airport), again in the anti-submarine role as one of Air Headquarters East Africa's Wing 246's general reconnaissance three squadrons. The squadron used the Consolidated Catalina to patrol the Indian Ocean from its base at Diego Suarez in northern Madagascar. Although the squadron headquarters remained at Diego Suarez, aircraft were also based in Kenya, Aden, Mauritius and South Africa.

==== U-197 ====
U-197 was caught on the surface 240 miles south of Madagascar by Catalina FP-126 of 259 Squadron on 20 August 1943. Damaged by machine gun fire and depth charges from the plane, the U-boat was forced to remain on the surface. Catalina FP-313 of 265 Squadron flown by Flying Officer C. Ernest Robin was called to attack, sinking the U-boat with all hands by depth charges.

==== U-862 ====
On 20 August 1944 Flight Lieutenant William Stewart Lough's Catalina FP104/H caught German submarine U-862 on the surface in the Mozambique Channel and attacked it. A depth charge was dropped but missed and the Catalina was hit by fire from the submarines anti-aircraft gun. The plane flew back over the submarine and crashed into the sea in front of it. The submarine recovered the planes log book, which showed it had been looking for a missing ship either the Empire City or Empire Day which had been sunk by U-198 on 5 August. None of the planes 9 crew and 4 passengers had survived. U-862 escaped unharmed to join the Monsun Gruppe based at Penang.

=== Disbandment ===
Towards the end of the war the units focus shifted from submarine hunting to moving freight. The squadrons disbandment date is as clouded as its founding date: sources cite 18 April 1945; 30 April 1945 or 1 May 1945. Its final patrol was on 12 April 1945.

== Aircraft operated ==
From	To	Aircraft	Variant	Number
Aug 1918	Jan 1919	Short 184		Unknown
Aug 1918	Jan 1919	Felixstowe F.3		Unknown
Apr 1943	Apr 1945	Consolidated Catalina	Mks. Ib	6

== See also ==
- List of Royal Air Force aircraft squadrons
