= German submarine U-196 =

German World War II submarine

History

Nazi Germany
- Name: U-196
- Ordered: 4 November 1940
- Builder: AG Weser, Bremen
- Yard number: 1042
- Laid down: 10 June 1941
- Launched: 24 April 1942
- Commissioned: 11 September 1942
- Fate: Missing since 1 December 1944 in the Sunda Straits south of Java, possibly due to a diving accident.

General characteristics
- Class & type: Type IXD2 submarine
- Displacement: 1,610 t (1,580 long tons) surfaced; 1,799 t (1,771 long tons) submerged
- Length: 87.58 m (287.3 ft) o/a; 68.50 m (224.7 ft) pressure hull
- Beam: 7.50 m (24.6 ft) o/a; 4.40 m (14.4 ft) pressure hull
- Height: 10.20 m (33.5 ft)
- Draught: 5.40 m (17.7 ft)
- Installed power: 9,000 PS (6,620 kW; 8,880 bhp) (diesels); 1,000 PS (740 kW; 990 shp) (electric)
- Propulsion: 2 shafts; 2 × diesel engines; 2 × electric motors
- Speed: surfaced 20.8 knots (38.5 km/h; 23.9 mph); submerged 6.9 knots (12.8 km/h; 7.9 mph)
- Range: surfaced 12,750 nmi (23,610 km; 14,670 mi) at 12 knots (22 km/h; 14 mph); submerged 57 nmi (106 km; 66 mi) at 4 knots (7.4 km/h; 4.6 mph)
- Test depth: Calculated crush depth: 230 m (750 ft)
- Complement: 55 – 64
- Armament: 6 × torpedo tubes (four bow, two stern); 24 × 53.3 cm (21 in) torpedoes; 2 × 10.5 cm (4.1 in) SK C/32 deck gun (240 rounds); 1 × 3.7 cm (1.5 in) SK C/30 AA gun; 1 × 2 cm (0.79 in) C/30 anti-aircraft guns

Service record
- Part of: 4th U-boat Flotilla; 11 September 1942 – 31 March 1943; 12th U-boat Flotilla; 1 April 1943 – 30 September 1944; 33rd U-boat Flotilla; 1 October – 1 December 1944
- Identification codes: M 49 455
- Commanders: K.Kapt. Eitel-Friedrich Kentrat; 11 September 1942 – 21 September 1944; Oblt.z.S. Werner Striegler; 1 October – 1 December 1944
- Operations: 3 patrols: 1st patrol: a. 13 March – 23 October 1943; b. 11 – 13 March 1944; 2nd patrol: a. 16 March – 10 August 1944; b. 1 September 1944; 3rd patrol: 30 November – 1 December 1944
- Victories: 3 merchant ships sunk (17,739 GRT)

German submarine U-196 was a Type IXD2 U-boat of Nazi Germany's Kriegsmarine during World War II. The submarine was laid down on 10 June 1941 at the AG Weser yard in Bremen, launched on 24 April 1942, and commissioned on 11 September 1942 under the command of Kapitänleutnant Eitel-Friedrich Kentrat. After training with the 4th U-boat Flotilla at Stettin, U-196 was transferred to the 12th flotilla for front-line service on 1 April 1943.

== Design ==
German Type IXD2 submarines were considerably larger than the original Type IXs. U-196 had a displacement of 1,610 tonnes (1,580 long tons) when at the surface and 1,799 tonnes (1,771 long tons) while submerged. The U-boat had a total length of 87.58 m (287 ft 4 in), a pressure hull length of 68.50 m (224 ft 9 in), a beam of 7.50 m (24 ft 7 in), a height of 10.20 m (33 ft 6 in), and a draught of 5.35 m (17 ft 7 in). The submarine was powered by two MAN M 9 V 40/46 supercharged four-stroke, nine-cylinder diesel engines plus two MWM RS34.5S six-cylinder four-stroke diesel engines for cruising, producing a total of 9,000 metric horsepower (6,620 kW; 8,880 shp) for use while surfaced, two Siemens-Schuckert 2 GU 345/34 double-acting electric motors producing a total of 1,000 shaft horsepower (1,010 PS; 750 kW) for use while submerged. She had two shafts and two 1.85 m (6 ft) propellers. The boat was capable of operating at depths of up to 200 metres (660 ft).

The submarine had a maximum surface speed of 20.8 knots (38.5 km/h; 23.9 mph) and a maximum submerged speed of 6.9 knots (12.8 km/h; 7.9 mph). When submerged, the boat could operate for 121 nautical miles (224 km; 139 mi) at 2 knots (3.7 km/h; 2.3 mph); when surfaced, she could travel 12,750 nautical miles (23,610 km; 14,670 mi) at 10 knots (19 km/h; 12 mph). U-196 was fitted with six 53.3 cm (21 in) torpedo tubes (four fitted at the bow and two at the stern), 24 torpedoes, two 10.5 cm (4.13 in) SK C/32 naval gun, 240 rounds, and a 3.7 cm (1.5 in) SK C/30 with 2575 rounds as well as one 2 cm (0.79 in) C/30 anti-aircraft gun with 8100 rounds. The boat had a complement of fifty-five.

== Service history ==
=== First patrol ===
Under Kentrat's command she completed the longest patrol made by a submarine during World War II, leaving Kiel on 13 March 1943, and returning to Bordeaux on 23 October 1943, spending 225 days at sea. During that time she sailed all the way around the coast of South Africa and sank two British merchant ships in the Indian Ocean.

=== Second patrol ===
U-196 sailed from Bordeaux on 16 March 1944 along with U-181 for service in the Far East. En route she sank a British freighter in the Indian Ocean. U-196 arrived at Penang on 10 August 1944.

=== Third patrol ===
U-196 was transferred to the 33rd U-boat Flotilla on 1 October 1944. On 30 November, U-196 left Batavia (Java, in Indonesia), now commanded by Oberleutnant zur See Werner Striegler. After departure U-196 was reassigned to refuel a sister U-boat in the Indian Ocean, but the rendezvous never took place. Efforts to contact U-196 during early December 1944 failed to elicit a response.

When she failed to return to Jakarta and failed repeatedly to signal her position, she was listed as missing in the Sunda Straits south of Java, effective from 12 December 1944.

Her wreck has never been found. The cause of U-196's sinking remains unknown. It has been suggested that she struck an Allied mine laid by the British submarine HMS Porpoise. However, Porpoise did not lay the mines until 9 December 1944.

Oberleutnant zur See Dr. Ing. Heinz Haake of U-196 is buried in a graveyard at Bogor, Java with members of the World War I German East Asia Squadron at Arca Domas, on the slopes of Mount Pangrango, Java. His date of death is listed on a memorial as 30 November 1944, the day U-196 sailed on her last voyage.

== Summary of raiding history ==
Date	Name	Nationality	Tonnage (GRT)	Fate
11 May 1943	Nailsea Meadow	United Kingdom	4,962	Sunk
3 August 1943	City of Oran	United Kingdom	7,323	Sunk
9 July 1944	Shahzada	United Kingdom	5,454	Sunk

== Bibliography ==
- Busch, Rainer; Röll, Hans-Joachim (1999). German U-boat commanders of World War II : a biographical dictionary. Translated by Brooks, Geoffrey. London, Annapolis, Md: Greenhill Books, Naval Institute Press. ISBN 1-55750-186-6.
- Busch, Rainer; Röll, Hans-Joachim (1999). Deutsche U-Boot-Verluste von September 1939 bis Mai 1945 [German U-boat losses from September 1939 to May 1945]. Der U-Boot-Krieg (in German). Vol. IV. Hamburg, Berlin, Bonn: Mittler. ISBN 3-8132-0514-2.
- Gröner, Erich; Jung, Dieter; Maass, Martin (1991). U-boats and Mine Warfare Vessels. German Warships 1815–1945. Vol. 2. Translated by Thomas, Keith; Magowan, Rachel. London: Conway Maritime Press. ISBN 0-85177-593-4.
