= No. 259 Squadron RAF =

Former flying squadron of the Royal Air Force

- Active: 20 August 1918 – 14 January 1919; 16 February 1943 – 1 May 1945
- Country: United Kingdom
- Branch: Royal Air Force
- Mottos: Swahili: Haya ingia napigane ("Get in a fight")

Insignia
- Squadron Badge: An eagle head over a globe
- Squadron Codes: VP (Apr 1939 – Sep 1939)

No. 259 Squadron RAF was a Royal Air Force Squadron formed in Africa as a reconnaissance and anti-submarine unit in World War II.

== History ==
=== World War I ===
No. 259 Squadron Royal Flying Corps was authorized to form on 20 August 1918 but there is no evidence that it did so, and it was formally disbanded on 14 January 1919.

=== Formation in World War II ===
The squadron formed on 16 February 1943 at Kipevu, Kenya and flew anti-submarine patrols over the Indian Ocean equipped with Catalinas. Detachments of the squadron were based at Dar-es-Salaam, Diego Suarez, Khormaksar, Masirah, Port Victoria, Tulear, Lake St. Lucia in South Africa and Mauritius. The squadron was disbanded on 1 May 1945 by which time it was re-equipping with Sunderlands.

== Aircraft operated ==
Aircraft operated by no. 259 Squadron RAF
From	To	Aircraft	Variant
Feb 1943	Apr 1945	Consolidated PBY Catalina	IB
Mar 1945	Apr 1945	Short Sunderland	V
