= Cruiser rules =

Naval rules of engagement against merchant ships

Cruiser rules, alternatively called prize rules, is a colloquial phrase referring to the conventions regarding the attacking of a merchant ship by an armed vessel. Here cruiser is meant in its original meaning of a ship sent on an independent mission such as commerce raiding. Cruiser in modern naval terminology refers to a type of ship rather than its mission. Cruiser rules govern when it is permissible to open fire on an unarmed ship and the treatment of the crews of captured vessels, and are contrasted to unrestricted submarine warfare where submarines attack without warning and do not act to protect crew.

During both world wars, the question was raised of whether or not submarines were subject to cruiser rules. In each war, submarines initially attempted to obey them, but abandoned them as the war progressed.

== Overview ==
The essence of cruiser rules is that an unarmed vessel (as distinct from an armed warship) should not be attacked without warning. It can be fired on only if it repeatedly fails to stop when ordered to do so or resists being boarded by the attacking ship. The armed ship may only intend to search for contraband (such as war materials) when stopping a merchantman. If so, the ship may be allowed on its way, after removal of any contraband. However, if it is intended to take the captured ship as a prize of war, or to destroy it, then adequate steps must be taken to ensure the safety of the crew. This may mean taking the crew on board and transporting them to a safe port, as some argue it is not acceptable to leave the crew in lifeboats unless they can be expected to reach safety by themselves and have sufficient supplies and navigational equipment to do so.

During diplomatic negotiations in WWI these rules were often softened to stopping a vessel with a warning shot, offering the crew time to embark into lifeboats, before sinking the vessel. It is also suggested that ships in convoy with armed escort are not covered by this protection.

== History ==
The cruiser rules evolved during the 17th century when the issuing of letters of marque to privateers was at its peak. They were initially an understanding of the honourable way to behave rather than formal international agreements.

Attempts to codify these rules include agreements between Great Britain and France at the end of the Crimean War which were extended internationally at the Paris Declaration Respecting Maritime Law in 1856. It was signed by all maritime nations except the United States and Spain. A new international agreement was reached in 1909, the London Declaration concerning the Laws of Naval War, referring to the issue with Article 50. The participants in this treaty were the main European powers, the United States, and the Empire of Japan. While the treaty was not ratified and submarines were not mentioned, the treaty was respected at the start of the war. However the core of the rules at the start of WWI was the loose assemblage of precedents and manuals across many nations that is international customary law.

The first British merchant ship to be sunk by a German submarine was the SS Glitra in October 1914. The submarine, SM U-17, allowed the Glitra's crew to board lifeboats first and then towed them to shore after sinking the ship. Abiding by the cruiser rules in this strict sense was particularly problematic for submarines. They did not have the room to take captured crew on board and towing lifeboats prevented the submarine from diving. This put the submarine at considerable risk.

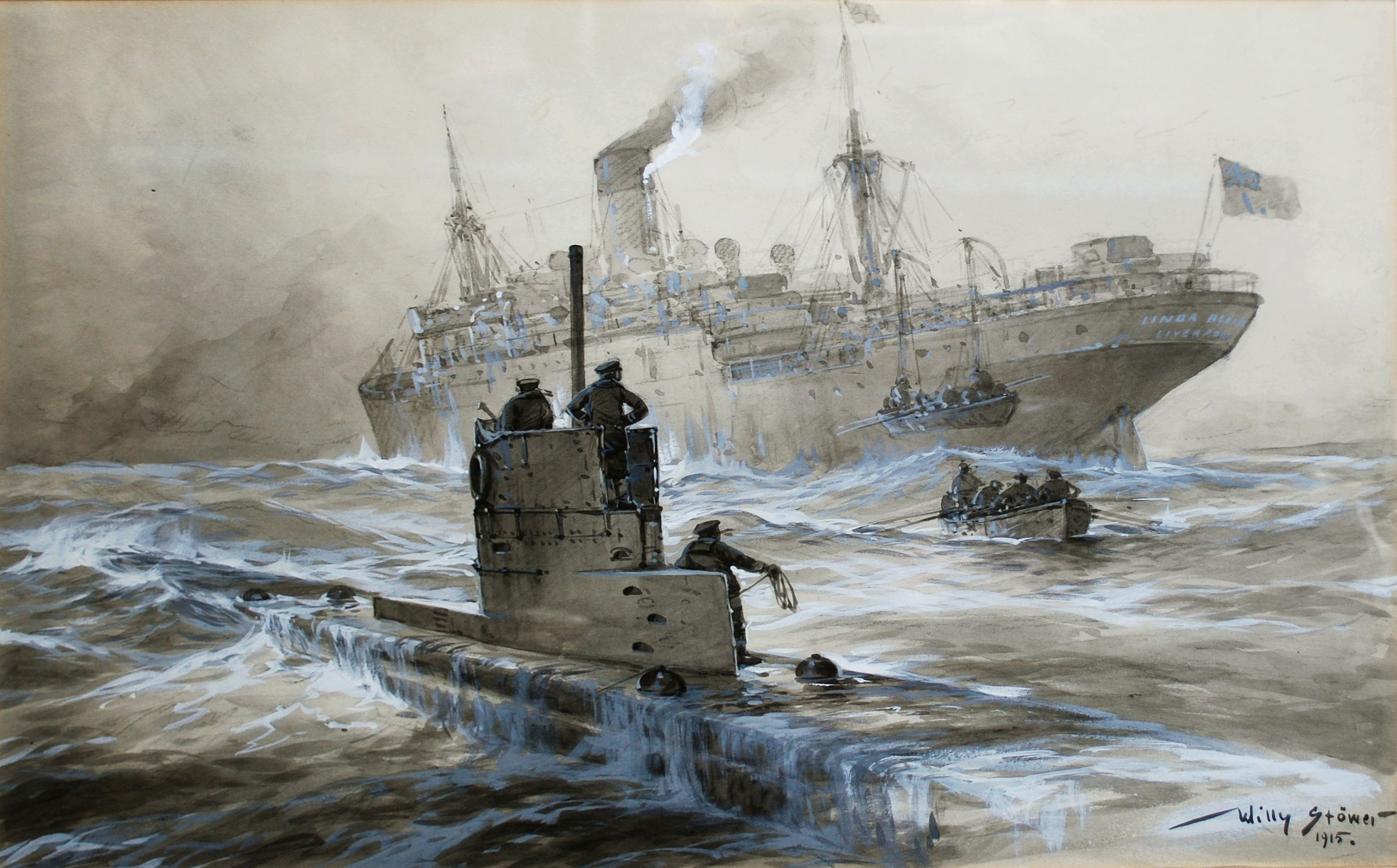
German art of the sinking of the Linda Blanche on 30 January 1915 by SM U-21. Passengers and crew are being allowed to disembark into lifeboats.

At the beginning of 1915 Germany declared a war zone around the British Isles in retaliation for the British blockade of Germany, in contravention of the cruiser rules. Henceforth, all allied shipping within the declared zone was liable to attack without warning. This led to a series of notorious attacks on passenger ships with the loss of civilian lives, some of them American. These included RMS Lusitania in May 1915, SS Arabic in August 1915, and SS Sussex in March 1916. Fearing that American deaths would lead to the US entering the war, after each of these incidents Germany introduced new restrictions, culminating in the Sussex pledge not to sink merchant ships until they had witnessed that life boats had been launched, equating to a vow to follow a version of the cruiser rules in all theatres.

Overall, until 1917, the majority of sinkings were indeed done on the surface, in approximate accordance with cruiser rules. Doing so was more militarily effective (considering the small numbers of torpedoes carried) and had lower risk of political fallout, even despite the risk from Q-ships and increasing numbers of armed merchantmen. Submarine commerce raiders still retained the advantage of being able to evade the British naval blockade, and U-boat aces like Lothar von Arnauld de la Perière accumulated some of the greatest success rates in history operating in this way. However, the German Imperial Admiralty Staff chafed at any restrictions on the U-boat campaign.

Germany announced a renewed campaign of unrestricted submarine warfare in February 1917. Germany believed that this strategy would win the war for them, estimating a 50% increase in tonnage sunk, but in reality it contributed to their defeat by causing, in part, the US to enter the war on the side of the Allies. In the postwar period, the official German naval history strongly criticised the WWI Admiralty for failing to adequately pursue submarine warfare under cruiser rules.

At the start of World War II, many German submarines were built with deck guns and the initial order was for attacks to be in accordance with prize rules. Despite this, a liner, the SS Athenia, was sunk by accident early on. In December 1939, War Order No. 154 instructed captains to adopt unrestricted submarine warfare, though during the early part of the Battle of the Atlantic attacks occurred with a mix of torpedoes and surface attacks. Surface attacks became more dangerous as the war progressed, until deck guns were finally removed from most U-boats in 1943–1944. Varying degrees of effort were also placed in rescuing enemy crew, culminating in the September 1942 Laconia incident where a B-24 attacked submarines in the process of rescuing passengers from a stricken liner. The subsequent Laconia Order forbade submarines from making further rescue attempts, though a few U-boats disobeyed this. American submarines operating in the Pacific adopted unrestricted submarine warfare from the beginning of their entry to the war, and this was a major factor in the German navy's actions being treated leniently at the Nuremberg Trials.

== Bibliography ==
- Barclay, Thomas, "Declaration of Paris", in Chisholm, Hugh, Encyclopædia Britannica (11th ed.), vol. 7, Cambridge University Press, 1911.
- Booth, Tony, Admiralty Salvage in Peace and War 1906 - 2006, Pen and Sword, 2007, ISBN 1783374705.
- Gillespie, Alexander, A History of the Laws of War: Volume 1, Hart Publishing, 2011 ISBN 1849462046.
- Griess, Thomas E (ed), The Second World War: Europe and the Mediterranean, Square One Publishers, 2002 ISBN 0757001602.
- Lambert, Andrew, "The only British advantage: sea power and strategy, September 1939-June 1940", in Clemmesen, Michael H; Faulkner, Marcus S (eds), Northern European Overture to War, 1939-1941: From Memel to Barbarossa, pp. 45-74, Brill, 2013 ISBN 9004249095.
- Nolan, Liam; Nolan, John E, Secret Victory: Ireland and the War at Sea, 1914-1918, Mercier Press, 2009 ISBN 1856356213.
- Schmidt, Donald E, The Folly of War: American Foreign Policy, 1898-2005, Algora Publishing, 2005 ISBN 0875863833.
