= Werner Hartenstein =

German naval officer and U-boat commander during World War II

- Born: 27 February 1908; Plauen, German Empire
- Died: 8 March 1943 (aged 35); U-156, Atlantic Ocean, off Barbados
- Military career
- Allegiance: Weimar Republic; Nazi Germany
- Branch: Reichsmarine; Kriegsmarine
- Service years: 1928–1943
- Rank: Korvettenkapitän (corvette captain)
- Units: SSS Niobe cruiser Emden; Survey vessel Meteor cruiser Köln torpedo boat Greif
- Commands: Seeadler; Jaguar; U-156
- Conflicts: See battles Spanish Civil War World War II: Operation Weserübung; Battle of the Atlantic; Attack on Aruba
- Awards: Knight's Cross of the Iron Cross

Werner Hartenstein (27 February 1908 – 8 March 1943) was a German naval officer during World War II who commanded the U-boat U-156. He was a recipient of the Knight's Cross of the Iron Cross, the highest award in the military and paramilitary forces of Nazi Germany during World War II. Hartenstein was credited with sinking 19 ships totaling 97,504 gross register tons (GRT), and with damaging three ships and a destroyer.

Born in Plauen, Hartenstein joined the Reichsmarine (navy of the Weimar Republic) in 1928. After a period of training on surface vessels and service on various torpedo boats during the Spanish Civil War and the first year of World War II, he transferred to the U-boat service in 1941. In September 1942, Hartenstein torpedoed and sank the RMS Laconia, then attempted to rescue the survivors. He was forced to abort the rescue when his U-boat came under attack by a B-24 Liberator bomber of the United States Army Air Forces. The event became known as the "Laconia incident" and resulted in the "Laconia Order", an order from the Befehlshaber der Unterseeboote to the entire German U-boat force that forbade rescuing the survivors of sunken ships. Hartenstein and the entire crew of U-156 were killed in action by depth charges from a US PBY Catalina aircraft on 8 March 1943.

== Early life and pre-war service ==
Hartenstein was born in Plauen in the Vogtland of the Kingdom of Saxony, then a federated state of the German Empire, on 27 February 1908. He was the second child of William Karl Adolf Hartenstein, an export merchant, and Selma Emma Hartenstein, née Schlingensiepen. Hartenstein had one older sister, Thea Irena, and a younger sister, Charlotte. He celebrated his confirmation in 1923 and graduated from a humanities-oriented secondary school in Plauen with his diploma (Abitur) in 1926. (Note: humanities-oriented secondary school—humanistische Staatsgymnasium) After graduation in 1926 he applied for a naval officer cadetship but was rejected at first, and instead studied two semesters of jurisprudence. He matriculated at the University of Freiburg (Albert-Ludwigs-Universität Freiburg) in Freiburg im Breisgau on 29 April 1927.

Aged 20, Hartenstein re-applied for the cadetship, was accepted and began his naval career with the Reichsmarine on 1 April 1928 as a member of "Crew 28" (the incoming class of 1928). He underwent basic military training in the 2nd department of the standing ship division of the Baltic Sea in Stralsund (1 April 1928 – 30 June 1928). (Note: 2nd department —II. Abteilung) (Note: standing ship division —Schiffsstammdivision) Hartenstein was then transferred to the training ship Niobe (1 July 1928 – 15 October 1928), attaining the rank of Seekadett (midshipman) on 11 October 1928. Following a 14-month stay on board the cruiser Emden (16 October 1928 – 3 January 1930) he advanced in rank to Fähnrich zur See (officer cadet) on 1 January 1930. Emden at the time was under the command of Lothar von Arnauld de la Perière, a U-boat commander during World War I. Hartenstein then underwent a number of officer training courses at the Naval Academy at Mürwik, including navigational training cruises on the survey vessel Meteor, before transferring to the light cruiser Köln (1 October 1931 – 23 September 1934). His stay on Köln was occasionally interrupted to attend further training courses at Wilhelmshaven and Kiel-Wik. During this assignment on 30 January 1933, the Nazi Party, under the leadership of Adolf Hitler, came to power in Germany, and began to rearm the navy. In 1935, the Reichsmarine was renamed the Kriegsmarine.

Hartenstein served as first watch officer on the torpedo boat Greif from 30 September 1936 to 13 November 1938. He was promoted to Kapitänleutnant (captain lieutenant) on 1 June 1937. Hartenstein participated in several patrols in 1937 and 1938 on board Greif in Spanish waters during the Spanish Civil War. For these services he was awarded the Spanish Cross in Bronze (Spanienkreuz in Bronze) on 6 June 1939.

== World War II ==
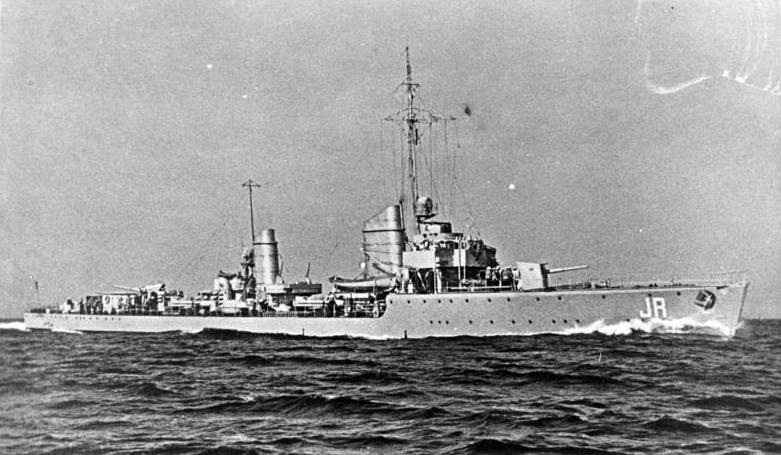
torpedo boat Jaguar

At the outbreak of World War II, Hartenstein continued to serve on torpedo boats. In this position, he completed 65 patrols in the North Sea, Norwegian waters, the Bay of Biscay and the English Channel in the first one and a half years of the war. Hartenstein took command of torpedo boat Seeadler on 20 November 1938. In October 1939 Hartenstein transferred and switched command of torpedo boat Jaguar with Kapitänleutnant Franz Kohlauf who took over command of Seeadler. On 30 March 1941, command of Jaguar was given to Kapitänleutnant Friedrich-Karl Paul and Hartenstein transferred to the U-boat force, and on 4 September 1941 was given command of U-156, a Type IXC U-boat. For his service on torpedo boats, Hartenstein was awarded the German Cross in Gold (Deutsches Kreuz in Gold) on 2 February 1942. Karl Dönitz personally pinned the award on Harteinstein's leather jacket on 17 March 1942. U-156 was first assigned to the 4th U-boat Flotilla at Stettin as a training boat, then was transferred to the 2nd U-boat Flotilla at Lorient, France, on 31 December 1941.

=== First patrol ===
Hartenstein's first patrol (24 December 1941 – 10 January 1942) was an uneventful transfer patrol taking U-156 from Kiel to Lorient. U-156, together with U-87 and U-753, transited through the Kaiser Wilhelm Canal, passing Brunsbüttel where they joined up with a pathfinder and U-135. (Note: pathfinder—Sperrbrecher) The convoy received aerial protection from Messerschmitt Bf 109 fighter aircraft and split up once they reached Cuxhaven. Passing south of the Shetland Islands, bypassing the Hebrides, U-156 slowly approached Rockall, where two weather buoys (Wetterfunkgeräte/Boje, or WFB) were released: "WFB 33" on 7 January 1942 at 51°04.3′N 11°04′W, and "WFB 32" on 8 January 1942 at 02:44 at 53°24′N 13°32′W in the Porcupine Bank. U-156 received a radio message on the evening of 8 January ordering Hartenstein to proceed at high speed to Lorient, where it arrived on 10 January 1942.

=== Second patrol ===
On his second patrol (19 January 1942 – 17 March 1942) Hartenstein commanded a wolfpack of U-boats (Gruppe Neuland—Group New Land) during the Attack on Aruba in February 1942, attacking an oil refinery. U-156 along with U-67 under the command of Günther Müller-Stöckheim and U-502 under the command of Jürgen von Rosenstiel departed from Lorient under the protection of a pathfinder in the early morning of 19 January 1942. Hartenstein's orders were to conduct a simultaneous surprise attack of the Gruppe Neuland against the shipping traffic off Aruba and Curaçao. Besides U-156, U-67 and U-502, Gruppe Neuland also included the submarines U-129 under the command of Nicolai Clausen and U-161 under the command of Albrecht Achilles.

On 16 February, after observing the area for a few days, U-156 came around to the refineries. There in front of her target were two Lago Company flat-bottom steamers, SS Pedernales and Oranjestad, both British-owned oilers. At 01:31, U-156 surfaced in San Nicolaas Harbour some 1.5 km (0.81 nmi; 0.93 mi) offshore and attacked the two British tankers at anchor. Hartenstein fired one torpedo from his bow tubes at Pedernales. The torpedo attack was successful and Pedernales was hit amidships. Loaded with crude oil, the steamer immediately burst into flames, killing eight of her 26 crewmen and wounding her captain Herbert McCall. Oranjestad then began to lift anchor and steam away but she was too late and was hit by a second torpedo fired from U-156. She too burst into flames and sunk an hour later in about 70 m (230 ft) of water. Fifteen of her 22 crewmen were killed.

At 03:13, U-156 attacked the Texaco-owned tanker SS Arkansas which was berthed at Eagle Beach next to the Arend/Eagle Refinery. Just one of the torpedoes struck Arkansas and partially sank her but the damage was moderate and caused no casualties. Commander Hartenstein then steamed further around Aruba and directed his men to take to the deck guns and prepare for a naval bombardment of the large oil tank of the Lago Oil and Transport Company. The crew of the 10.5 cm SK L/45 naval gun forgot to remove the tampion from the barrel, so when Hartenstein ordered them to fire, the gun blew up. Gunnery Officer Dietrich von dem Borne was wounded badly, one foot having been severed. His comrade and trigger man Heinrich Büssinger was badly wounded as well and died several hours after the attack. Hartenstein ordered the 3.7 cm flak gun to continue the attack, causing only superficial damage.

=== Third patrol ===
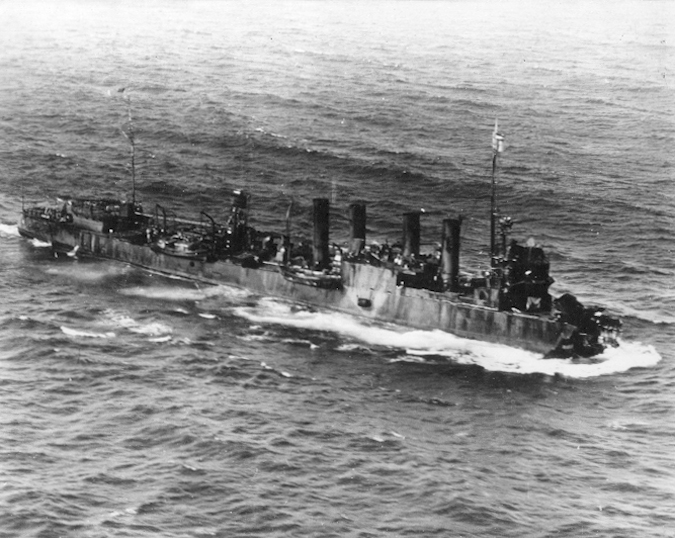
The heavily damaged USS Blakeley

On Hartenstein's third patrol (22 April 1942 – 7 July 1942), U-156 sank 12 ships and damaged a further two, including the USS Blakeley on 25 May 1942. This achievement earned Hartenstein a reference on 6 June 1942 in the Wehrmachtbericht, a propaganda bulletin issued by the headquarters of the Wehrmacht, the OKW. The mention was entered in the orders and decorations' section of a soldier's Service Record Book.

U-156 along with U-502 again departed from Lorient under the protection of a pathfinder on 22 April 1942 destined for the Caribbean Sea. Prior to the departure Dietrich von dem Borne, who had been severely wounded on the second patrol, was replaced by Oberleutnant zur See of the Reserve Gert Mannesmann. Chief engineer Wilhelm Polchau reported to Hartenstein on 6 May that the diesel compressor had malfunctioned. Hartenstein radioed U-66 under the command of Robert-Richard Zapp to assist. On 10 May U-156 and U-66 rendezvoused and exchanged 5 cubic metres (6.5 cu yd) of fuel oil for the necessary spare parts, and the fuel compressor was repaired. U-156 sighted the first steamer in the early afternoon on 12 May, the first of twelve ships—eleven merchantmen and one warship—attacked on this patrol, ten of which were sunk.

U-156, positioned near Fort-de-France, was ordered to observe the traffic to and from Martinique. At roughly 11 nautical miles (20 km; 13 mi) offshore, the hydrophones detected a ship. Hartenstein attacked from a submerged position firing two torpedoes. One torpedo struck the bow of the Blakeley after a 25-second run-time. Hartenstein observed that the bow was completely blown away, but its engines kept running. The waters around Martinique were extremely shallow and Hartenstein decided not to pursue the destroyer. On 1 June 1942, Hartenstein was promoted to Korvettenkapitän (corvette captain). The first watch officer, Paul Just, left U-156 after returning from the third patrol. Just was replaced by Oberleutnant zur See Leopold Schumacher as new first watch officer. Just later became commander of U-6, U-151 and U-546.

Hartenstein and the entire crew of U-156 received a hero's welcome by the residents of Plauen on 20 July 1942. The people lined the streets as the whole crew marched from the railway station to the City Hall for the official welcome reception.

=== Fourth patrol and Laconia incident ===
On U-156's fourth patrol (20 August 1942 – 16 November 1942), Hartenstein sank and then organised the rescue of the survivors of RMS Laconia, resulting in the "Laconia incident" and "Laconia Order".

U-156 together with U-68 under the command of Karl-Friedrich Merten departed from Lorient on 20 August 1942 heading for the Bay of Biscay. Hartenstein received the order to operate against Convoy SL-119 on 25 August. After a two-day pursuit, U-156 found a straggler, the SS Clan Macwhirter, west of Casablanca. Hartenstein attacked from a submerged position to avoid detection under the bright moonlight. Clan Macwhirter was hit by two torpedoes and sank, killing nine members of the crew and two gunners; 79 sailors survived the sinking. Two later sightings on 2 and 6 September did not lead to favourable attack positions.

On 12 September 1942 U-156 was patrolling off the coast of West Africa midway between Liberia and Ascension Island roughly 600 nautical miles (1,100 km; 690 mi) south of Cape Palmas. At 11:37 the aft port lookout sighted a smoke stack at 230 degrees. Hartenstein followed the target, which was zigzagging at 14 knots (26 km/h; 16 mph), until the general direction of the large ocean liner became evident. U-156 was running at 17 knots (31 km/h; 20 mph) into a favourable attack position, and Hartenstein ordered the attack at 21:07. He slowed speed at 22:00 and ordered surfaced deflection shots from torpedo tubes I and III. After three minutes and six seconds the first torpedo detonated, then the second. He closed, hoping to capture the ship's senior officers, but then saw over two thousand people, many of them Italian prisoners of war, struggling in the water. Clay Blair speculates that Hartenstein may have been concerned about the effect his action would have on German relations with Italy. Alternatively he also may have had humanitarian considerations. Irrespective of his motivation, Hartenstein immediately began rescue operations. Laconia sank at 23:23.

At 01:25 on 13 September 1942 Hartenstein radioed the Befehlshaber der U-Boote (BdU—commander of U-boats) requesting guidance and confirmation on how to proceed. The BdU responded at 03:45 ordering Wolf pack Eisbär, consisting of U-507 under the command of Harro Schacht, U-506 under the command of Erich Würdemann and U-459 under the command of Georg von Wilamowitz-Moellendorf, to assist Hartenstein immediately. At 06:00 Hartenstein ordered that the following message be sent on the 25m wavelength:

"If any ship will assist the ship-wrecked Laconia crew, I will not attack providing I am not being attacked by ship or air forces. I picked up 193 men. 4°53 South/11°26 West – German submarine"

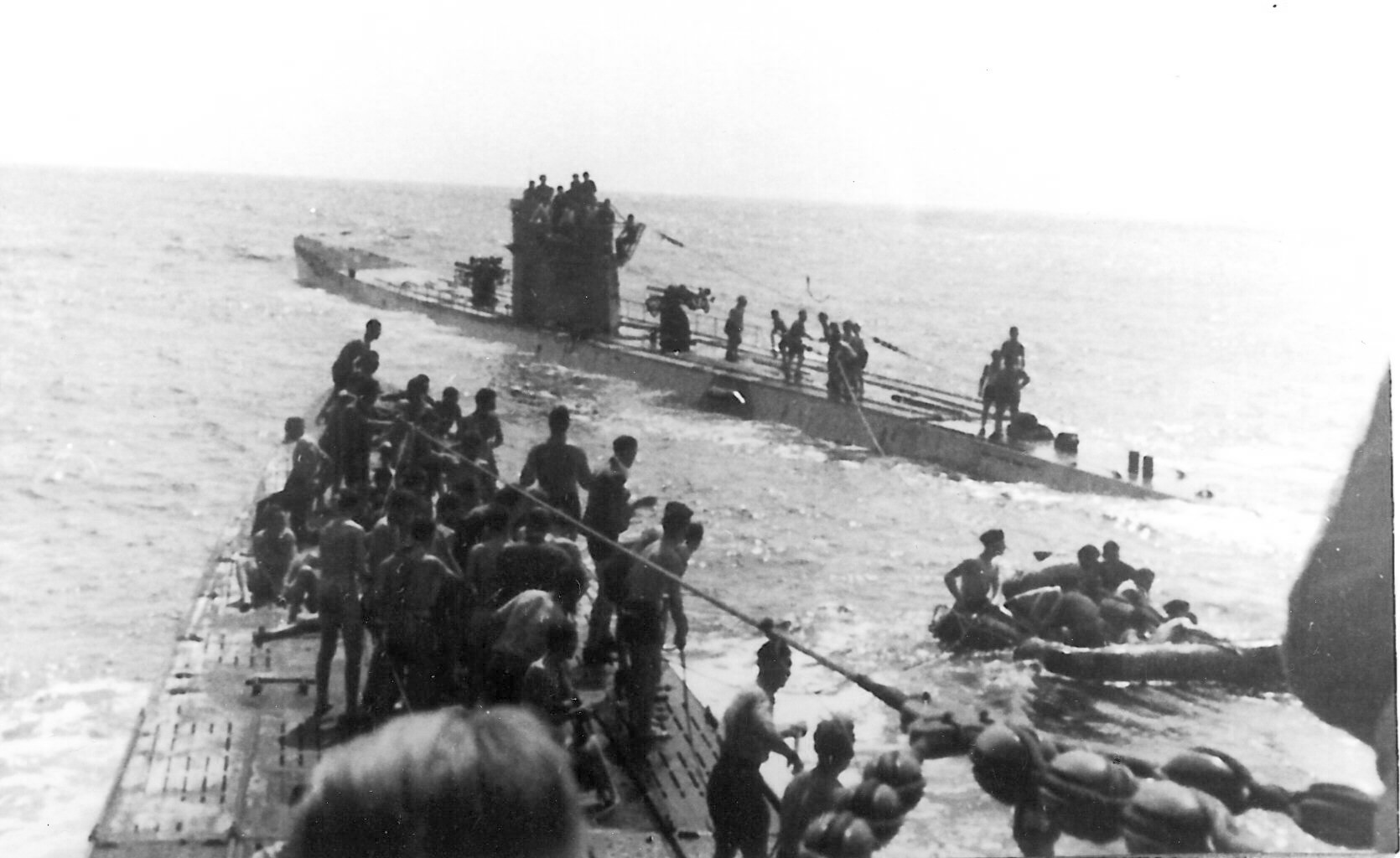
U-156 (foreground) and U-507 (background) on 15 September 1942

The message was repeated twice on the international 600m wavelength. The BdU later changed the order slightly and U-506, U-507 and the Italian submarine Capellini were dispatched. In parallel U-156 was assisting and supplying the survivors in the numerous lifeboats that kept arriving or were picked up. U-506 arrived at 11:32 on 14 September 1942, followed by U-507 in the afternoon of 15 September. Heading to a rendezvous with Vichy French ships under Red Cross banners, the U-boats were attacked by a U.S. Army B-24 Liberator bomber (343d Bomb Squadron; Lieutenant James D. Harden) at 12:32 on 16 September 1942. The attack ordered by Captain Robert C. Richardson III, which killed a number of people in the lifeboats and damaged U-156, forced Hartenstein to abandon the rescue operations. A majority of survivors were later rescued by British merchant ships and two Vichy French warships, the cruiser Gloire and the sloop Annamite, out of Dakar, Africa.

This event later became known as the "Laconia incident" and led BdU Admiral Karl Dönitz to issue the "Laconia order" to his U-boat commanders that stated in part "No attempt of any kind must be made at rescuing members of ships sunk ..." At the end of the war, the Laconia Order was unsuccessfully used against Admiral Dönitz in his war crime trial. The prosecution failed when Fleet Admiral Nimitz testified that in the war with Japan the United States Navy had followed the same general policy as was set forth in the German admiral's directive.

U-156 received a radio message on 17 September 1942 indicating that Werner Hartenstein had become the 63rd member of the U-boat service and the 125th of the Kriegsmarine to be awarded Germany's highest military honour, the Knight's Cross of the Iron Cross (Ritterkreuz des Eisernen Kreuzes). Hartenstein issued a bottle of beer to each member of the crew and held a speech honouring the achievements of everyone on board, and telling them that he would wear the decoration in their name.

On 19 September 1942, U-156 was roughly 800 nautical miles (1,500 km; 920 mi) south of Freetown and the crew was still repairing minor damage, when the lookout spotted a ship at 04:30. The target was the British ship Quebec City, en route from Cape Town to Freetown. Hartenstein attacked from a submerged position and hit Quebec City with one torpedo fired from tube VI. Hartenstein surfaced and approached the lifeboats and asked the survivors for the ship's name. Quebec City did not sink easily and U-156 fired 58 rounds from the 37 mm (1.46 in) flak gun and seven further shots from the 10.5 cm gun before Hartenstein ordered a cease fire. After a direct hit in the ship's stern ammunition magazine and an explosion, Quebec City slowly sank. According to William Clark, a member of Quebec City's crew, Hartenstein made sure that the survivors had enough water and provisions and that Captain William Thomas had the exact coordinates. This account of that attack and the impression that the humanitarian actions of Hartenstein made is documented in the book by David Cledlyn Jones, The Enemy We Killed, My Friend. Jones himself disagrees, stating that Hartenstein was concerned about the survivors' well-being but did not inquire about provisions, nor did he offer additional food or water. Hartenstein did express that it would have been his wish to tow them at least some distance to the African coast, but explained that he was not able to do so as he recently had been attacked while attempting to aid survivors.

=== Fifth patrol and death ===

During his fifth patrol (16 January 1943 – 8 March 1943), on 8 March 1943, Hartenstein and the entire crew of U-156 were killed in action by depth charges from a U.S. PBY Catalina aircraft (VP-53/P-1; Lieutenant E. Dryden), east of Barbados. The Catalina dropped four Mark 44 Torpex water-bombs at 13:15 from an altitude of 75 feet (23 m) to 100 feet (30 m) which straddled U-156. Two bombs were observed to hit the water 10 feet (3.0 m) to 15 feet (4.6 m) starboard and just aft of U-156, lifting it and breaking it in two, followed by an explosion. At least eleven survivors were seen swimming in the water. The Americans dropped two rubber rafts and rations, and five men were seen to reach one of the rafts. The USS Barney was dispatched from Trinidad to rescue the survivors. The search was abandoned on 12 March 1943. Korvettenkapitän Ernst Kals, chief of the 2nd U-boat Flotilla at Lorient, sent a letter to Hartenstein's parents on 23 April 1943 indicating that their son had been posted as missing in action as of 12 March 1943. (Note: U-156 had sent the last radio message to the BdU on 7 March 1943. This message informed the BdU of heavy air surveillance in the area of operations. The message also informed the BdU of the uselessness of the Metox radar warning receiver. It also reported of high precision aerial attacks made at night without the aid of search lights. The BdU for the first time requested U-156 to report back on 12 March 1943. The request was repeated again on 16, 17, 18, 19 and for the last time on 24 March 1943.) U.S. officials announced the destruction of the U-boat on 10 May 1943.

Ten months after his death a service of remembrance was held in Plauen on 15 January 1944. The service was attended by his parents, his sisters and other members of the family, the mayor of Plauen, Eugen Wörner, senior officials and councillors. The local press reported that "His parents have accepted that their loving son will not return home but is resting in peace with his Lord." Werner Hartenstein was portrayed by German actor Ken Duken in the 2011 TV mini-series The Sinking of the Laconia.

== Summary of career ==
As commander of U-156 Werner Hartenstein is credited with the sinking of 20 ships (including the motor boat Letitia Porter on board Koenjit) for a total of 97,504 gross register tons (GRT), further damaging three ships of 18,811 GRT and damaging one warship, USS Blakeley, of 1,190 long tons (1,210 tonnes).

=== Awards ===
- Spanish Cross in Bronze (6 June 1939)
- The Return of Memel Commemorative Medal (26 October 1939)
- Iron Cross (1939)
  - 2nd Class (16 November 1939)
  - 1st Class (27 April 1940)
- The Return of Sudetenland Commemorative Medal of 1 October 1938 (6 November 1940)
- Destroyer War Badge (24 December 1940)
- German Cross in Gold on 2 February 1942 as Kapitänleutnant on torpedo boat Jaguar/6. Torbedoboots-Flottille
- U-boat War Badge (1939) (17 March 1942)
- Knight's Cross of the Iron Cross on 17 September 1942 as Korvettenkapitän and commander of U-156

=== Promotions ===
| 11 October 1928: | Seekadett (Midshipman) |
| 1 April 1929: | Matrosengefreiter (Seaman 2nd class) |
| 1 January 1930: | Fähnrich zur See (Officer Cadet) |
| 1 April 1932: | Oberfähnrich zur See (Senior Ensign) |
| 1 October 1932: | Leutnant zur See (Second Lieutenant) |
| 1 September 1934: | Oberleutnant zur See (First Lieutenant) |
| 1 June 1937: | Kapitänleutnant (Captain Lieutenant) |
| 1 June 1942: | Korvettenkapitän (Corvette Captain) |

== Translation notes ==
Military offices
| Preceded by Korvettenkapitän Georg Waue | Deputy commander of 6th Torpedo-boat Flotilla; 4 March 1940 – January 1941 | Succeeded by Korvettenkapitän Hans Marks |
