= RMS Laconia (1921) =

British ocean liner from 1922 to 1942

Coordinates: 5°5′S 11°38′W

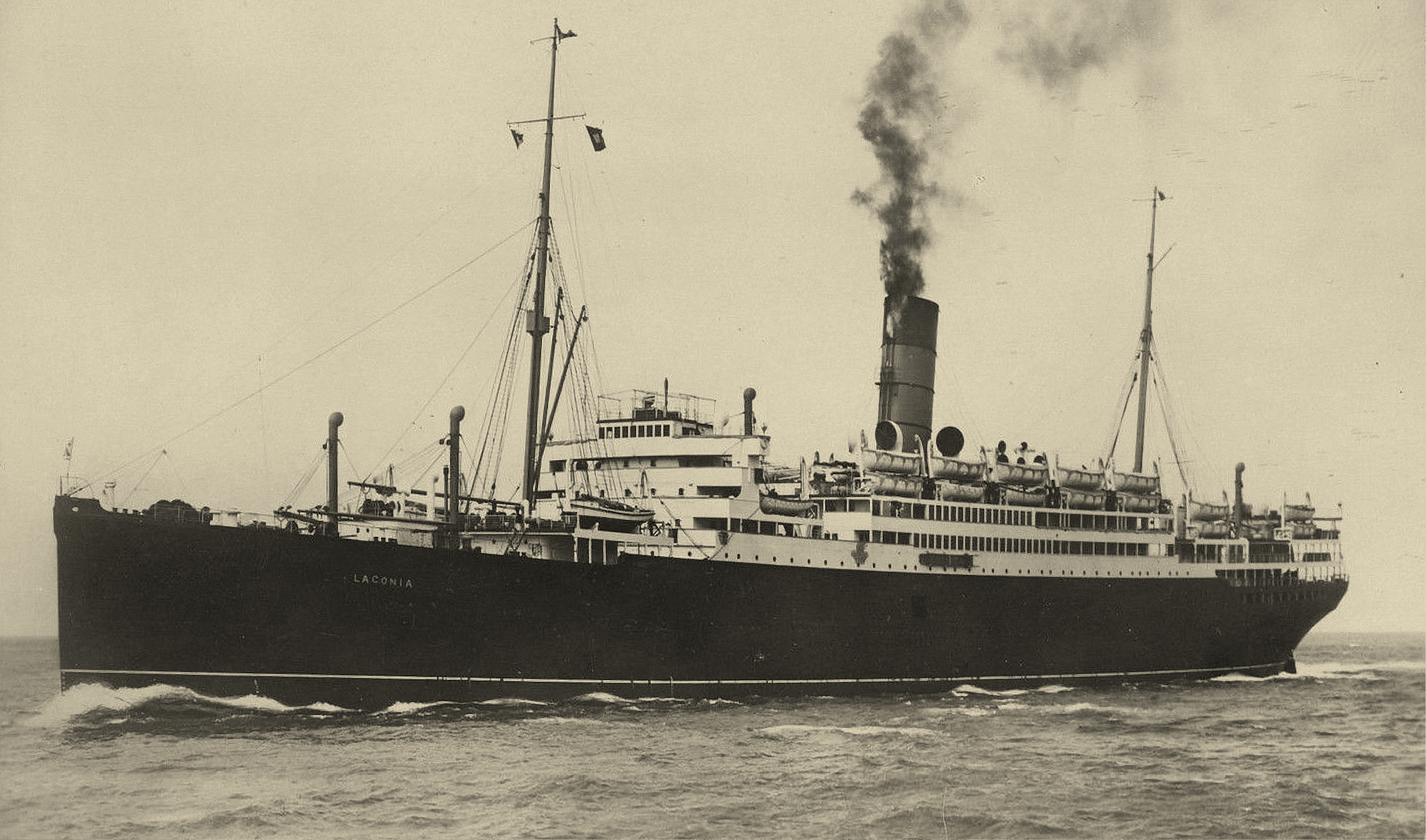
- RMS Laconia

History

United Kingdom
- Name: Laconia
- Namesake: Laconia
- Owner: 1921–34: Cunard Line; 1934–41: Cunard White Star Line
- Operator: 1921–34: Cunard Line; 1934–41: Cunard White Star Line
- Port of registry: Liverpool
- Route: Liverpool – Boston – New York
- Builder: Swan Hunter, Wallsend, England
- Yard number: 1125
- Launched: 9 April 1921
- Completed: January 1922
- Maiden voyage: 25 May 1922
- Identification: UK official number 145925; Code letters KLWT (1921–34); Call sign GJCD (1930–42)
- Fate: Sunk, 12 September 1942

General characteristics
- Type: Ocean liner
- Tonnage: 19,695 GRT; 11,804 NRT
- Length: 601.3 ft (183.3 m)
- Beam: 73.7 ft (22.5 m)
- Draught: 32 ft 8 in (10.0 m)
- Depth: 40.6 ft (12.4 m)
- Installed power: 6 steam turbines, double-reduction geared
- Propulsion: Twin propellers
- Speed: 16 knots (30 km/h)
- Capacity: Passengers: 350 1st class; 350 2nd class; 1,500 3rd class
- Notes: 54,089 cubic feet (1,531.6 m^{3}) refrigerated cargo

RMS Laconia was a Cunard ocean liner, built by Swan, Hunter & Wigham Richardson as a successor of the 1911–1917 RMS Laconia. The new ship was launched on 9 April 1921 and made her maiden voyage on 25 May 1922 from Southampton to New York City. At the outbreak of the Second World War, she was converted into an armed merchant cruiser, and in 1941, she was converted again, this last time into a troopship. She was sunk in the South Atlantic Ocean on 12 September 1942 by U-156 (Korvettenkapitän Werner Hartenstein). Some estimates of the death toll have suggested that over 1,658 people were killed when the Laconia sank. Hartenstein staged a rescue of the passengers and the crew of Laconia, which involved additional German U-boats and became known as the Laconia incident.

== Description ==
Laconia was 601.3 ft (183.3 m) long, with a beam of 73.7 ft (22.5 m). She had a depth of 40.6 ft (12.4 m) and a draught of 32 feet 8 inches (10.0 m). She was powered by six steam turbines of 2,561 nhp, which drove twin-screw propellers via double-reduction gearing. The turbines were made by the Wallsend Slipway & Engineering Company, Newcastle upon Tyne. In addition to her passenger accommodation, Laconia had 54,089 cubic feet (1,531.6 m^{3}) of refrigerated cargo space.

== Early career ==
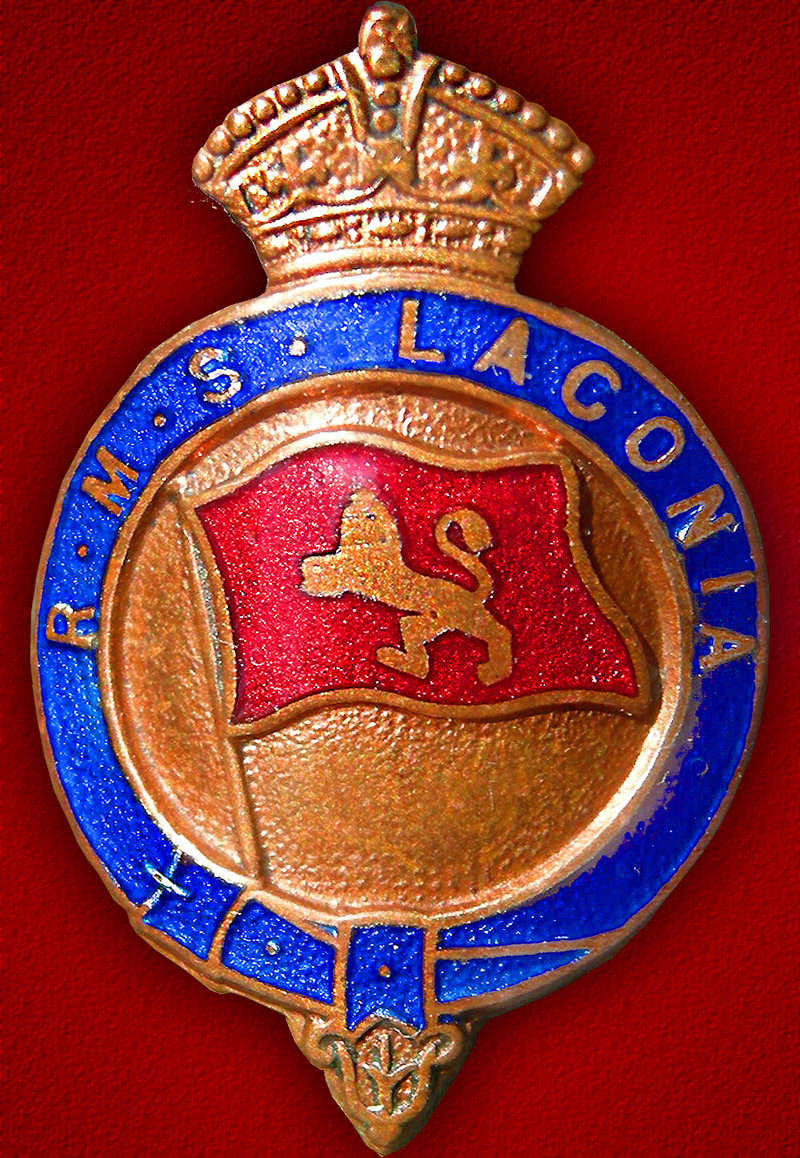
Crest of RMS Laconia with Royal Mail "crown" logo

Laconia was built by Swan, Hunter & Wigham Richardson Ltd, Wallsend, Northumberland. Launched on 9 April 1921, she was completed in January 1922. Her port of registry was Liverpool. Her UK official number was 145925, and until 1933, her code letters were KLWT. As a Royal Mail Ship, Laconia was entitled to display the Royal Mail "crown" logo as a part of her crest.

== Round the World ==
On 21 November 1922, Laconia began an around-the-world cruise, a charter by the American Express Company, which lasted 130 days and called at 22 ports, carrying 347 passengers, mostly leisure travelers. This was the first continuous circumnavigation of the world by passenger liner, a voyage later dubbed the first world cruise.

== Regular route ==
The Laconia primarily sailed on Cunard's Liverpool-Boston-New York transatlantic service from late spring to early winter, while she was employed in extended cruises to warmer climes from January to April.

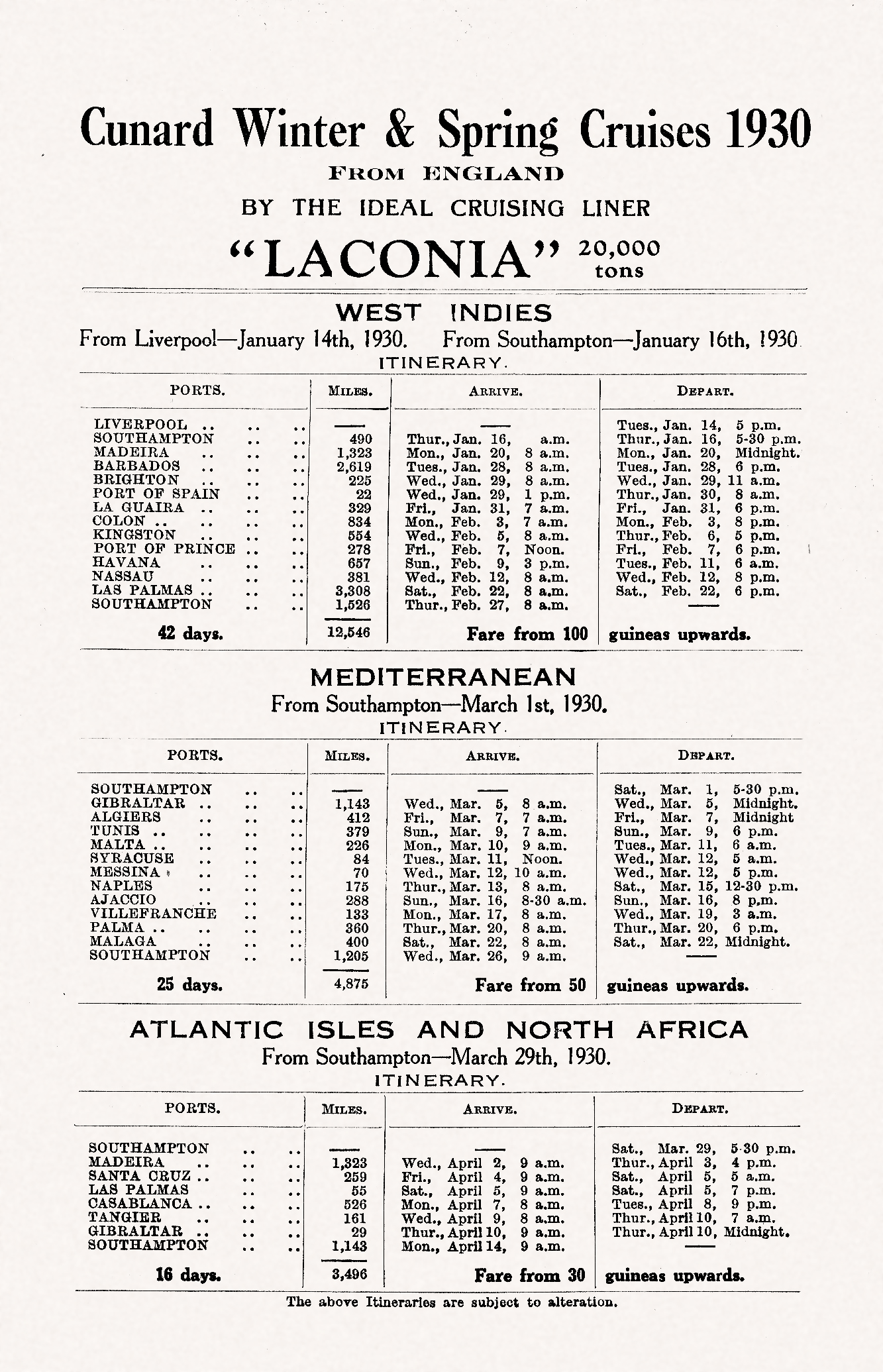
1930 cruise schedule

== Collisions ==
On 8 September 1925, Laconia collided with the British schooner Lucia P. Dow in the Atlantic Ocean 60 nautical miles (110 km) east of Nantucket, Massachusetts, United States. Laconia towed the schooner for 120 nautical miles (220 km) before handing the tow over to the American tug Resolute. By 1930 her call sign was GJCD, and in 1934 this superseded her code letters. On 24 September 1934, Laconia was involved in a collision off the US coast, while travelling from Boston to New York in dense fog. She rammed into the port side of Pan Royal, a US freighter. Both ships suffered serious damage, but were able to proceed under their own steam. Laconia returned to New York for repairs and resumed cruising in 1935.

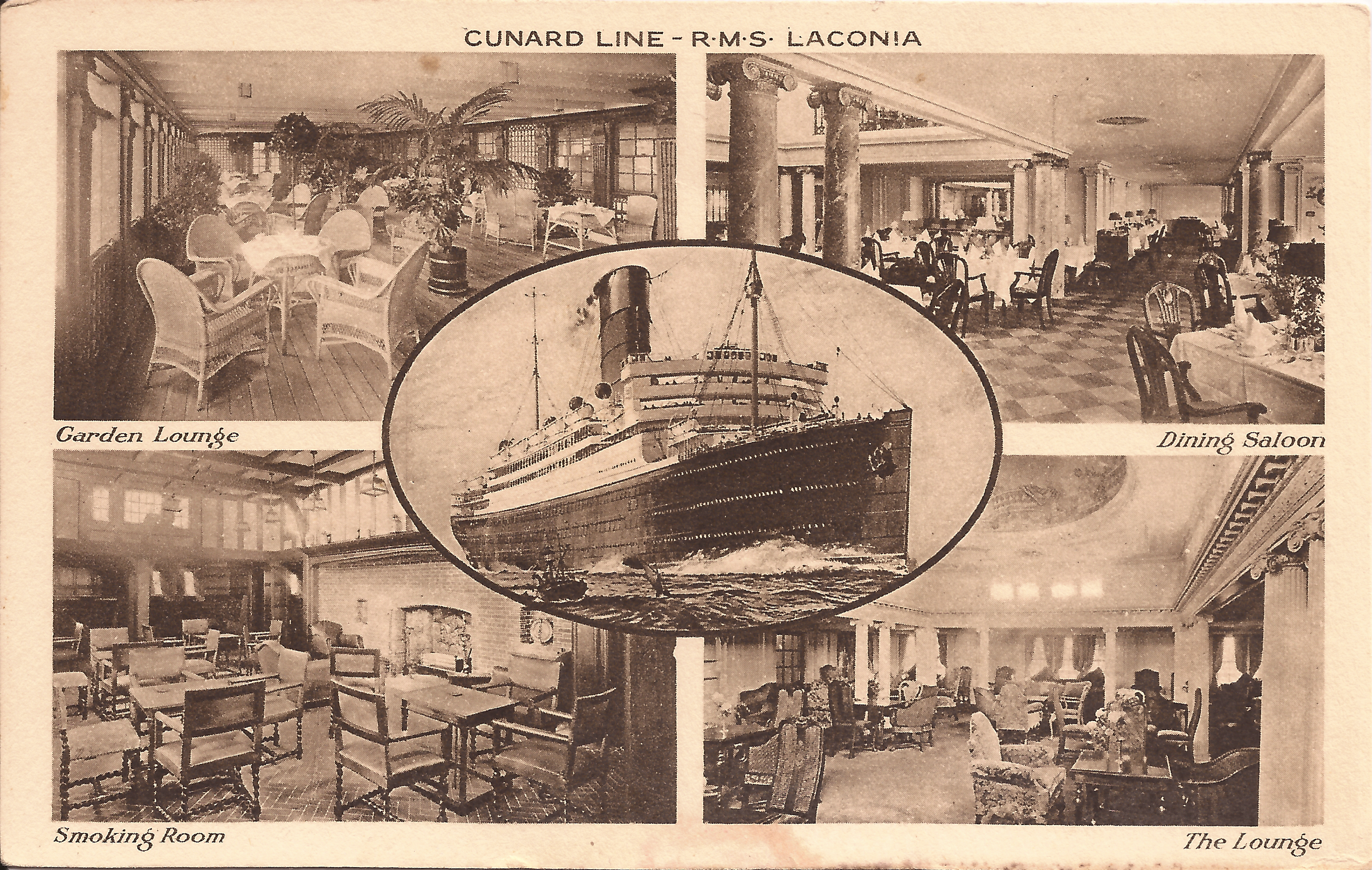
An early postcard depicting the lounge, the garden lounge, the dining salon, and the smoking room on the Laconia

== Drafted into war service ==
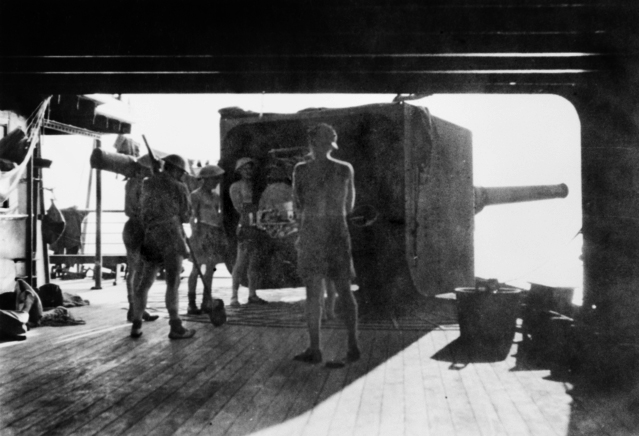
Australians manning a 6-inch gun, 22 March 1942

On 4 September 1939, the Admiralty requisitioned Laconia and had her converted into an armed merchant cruiser. By January 1940, she had been fitted with eight 6-inch guns and two 3-inch high-angle guns. After trials off the Isle of Wight, she embarked gold bullion and sailed for Portland, Maine, and Halifax, Nova Scotia, on 23 January. She spent the next few months escorting convoys to Bermuda and to points in the mid-Atlantic, where they would join up with other convoys.

On 9 June, she ran aground in the Bedford Basin at Halifax, suffering considerable damage, and repairs were not completed till the end of July. In October, her passenger accommodation was dismantled and some areas filled with oil drums to provide extra buoyancy so that she would stay afloat longer if torpedoed.

During the period June–August 1941 Laconia returned to Saint John, New Brunswick, and was refitted, then returned to Liverpool to be used as a troop transport for the rest of the war. On 12 September 1941, she arrived at Bidston Dock, Birkenhead, and was taken over by Cammell Laird and Company to be converted. By early 1942, the work was complete, and for the next six months, she made trooping voyages to the Middle East. On one such voyage, the ship was used to carry prisoners of war (POWs), mainly Italian. She travelled to Cape Town and then set a course for Freetown, following a zigzag course and undertaking evasive steering during the night.

== Final voyage ==
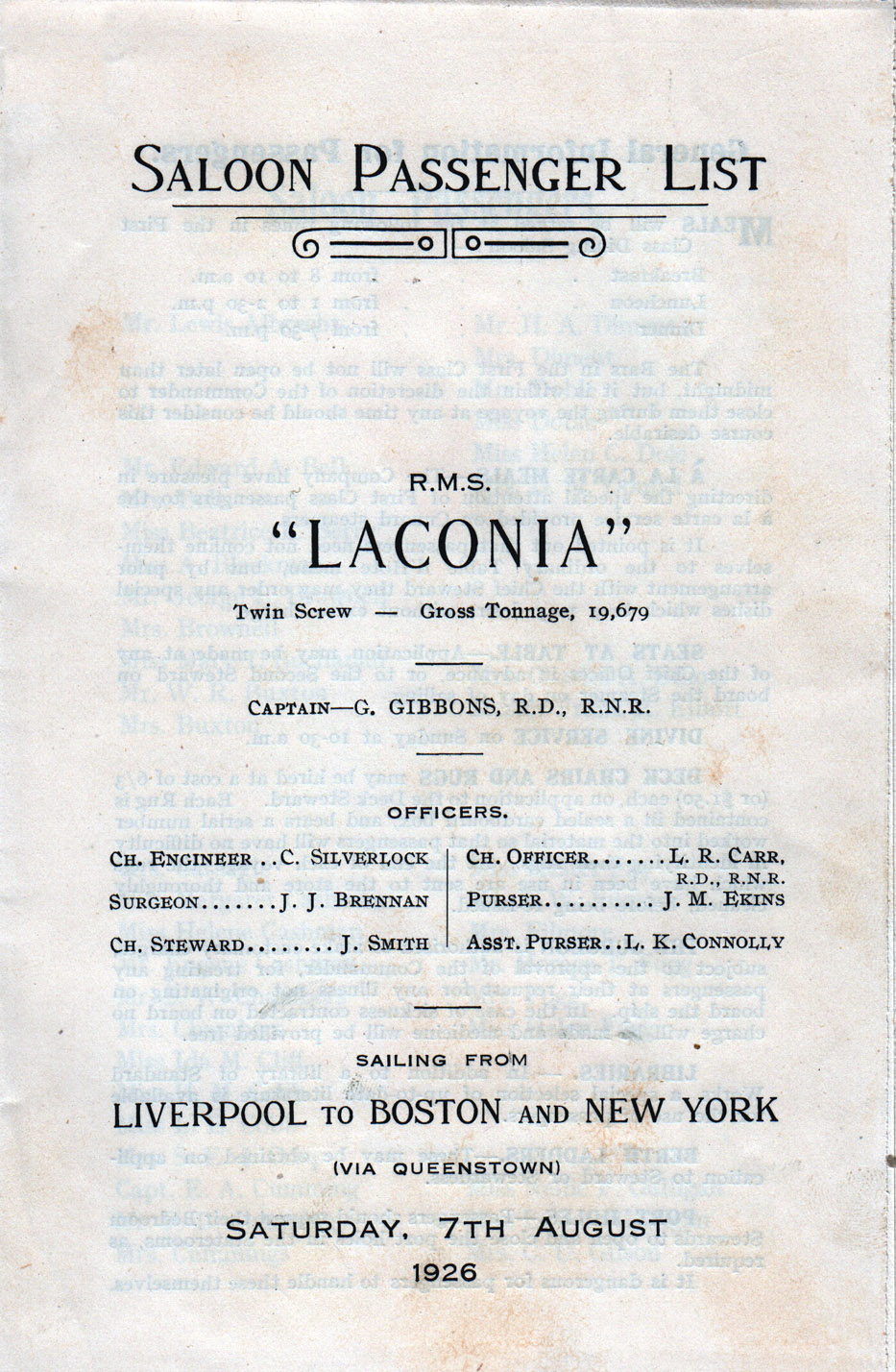
Laconia "Saloon Passenger List" 7 August 1926

On 12 September 1942, at 8:10 pm, 130 miles (210 km) north-northeast of Ascension Island, Laconia was hit on the starboard side by a torpedo fired by U-boat U-156. An explosion occurred in the hold, and many of the Italian POWs aboard were killed instantly. The vessel immediately took a list to starboard and settled heavily by the bow. Captain Rudolph Sharp, who had also commanded another Cunard liner, RMS Lancastria when she was sunk by enemy action, was gaining control over the situation when a second torpedo hit Number Two hold. At the time of the attack, the Laconia was carrying 268 British personnel (including many women and nurses), 160 Polish soldiers (who were on guard), at least 87 civilian women and children, and roughly 1,800 Italian POWs.

Captain Sharp ordered the ship abandoned, and the women, children, and injured were taken into the lifeboats first. By this time, the ship's forecastle was awash. Some of the 32 lifeboats had been destroyed by the explosions. According to Italian survivors, many of the POWs were left locked in the holds, and some of those who escaped and tried to board lifeboats and rafts were shot or bayoneted by their Polish captors. While most British and Polish troops and crew survived, only 415 Italians were rescued, out of 1,809 who had been on board.

At 9:11 pm, Laconia sank, bow first, her stern rising to be vertical, with Sharp himself and many of the Italian POWs still on board. The prospects for those who escaped the ship were only slightly better; sharks were common in the area, and the lifeboats were adrift in the mid-Atlantic with little hope of rescue.

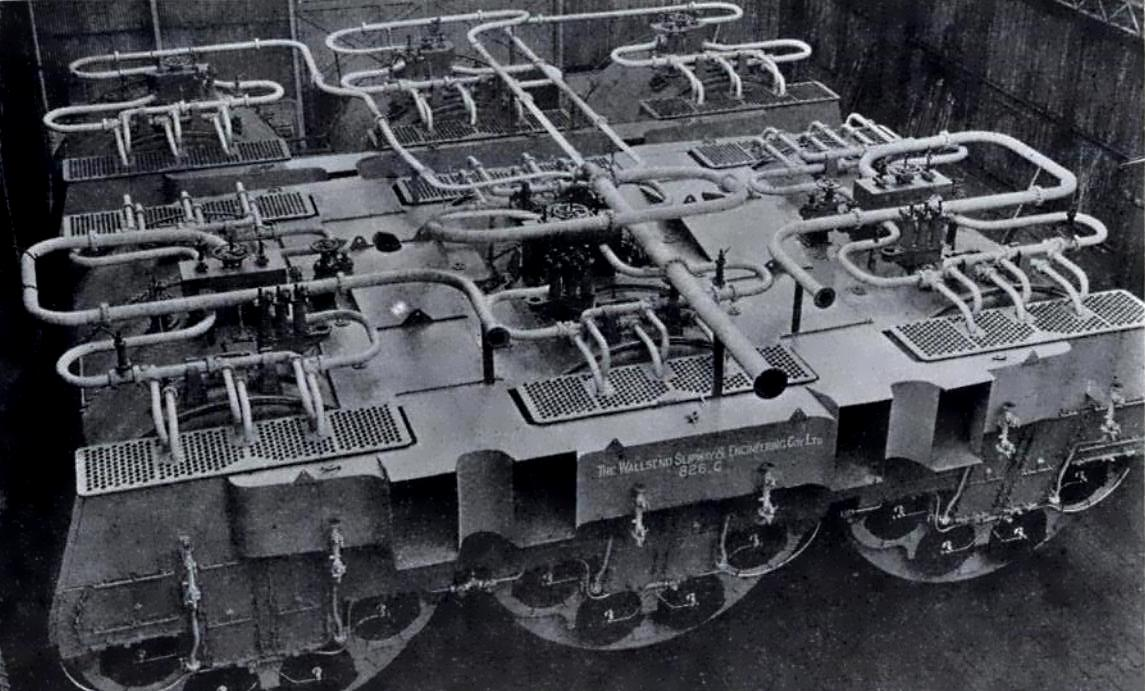
Boiler installation of the Laconia in 1922

When Kapitänleutnant Werner Hartenstein, commanding officer of U-156, realized civilians and POWs were on board, he surfaced to rescue survivors, and asked the Befehlshaber der U-Boote (U-boat Command in Germany) for help. Several U-boats were dispatched; all flew Red Cross flags, and signalled by radio that a rescue operation was underway.

The next morning, a United States Army Air Forces B-24 Liberator plane sighted the rescue efforts. Hartenstein signaled the pilot for assistance, who then notified the American base on Ascension Island of the situation. Captain Robert C. Richardson III, who later claimed to have been unaware of the Germans' radio message, recklessly ordered that the U-boats be attacked. Despite the Liberator crew clearly seeing the Red Cross flags, they pressed home their attack. The survivors crowded on the submarines' decks and the towed lifeboats, as the B-24 made several deadly attack runs on U-156. The Germans ordered their submarines to dive, abandoning many survivors.

After the incident, Admiral Karl Dönitz issued the Laconia Order, henceforth ordering his commanders not to rescue survivors after attacks. Vichy French ships rescued 1,083 persons from the lifeboats and took aboard those picked up by the four submarines, and in all, around 1,500 survived the sinking. Other sources state that only 1,083 survived and an estimated 1,658 persons died (98 crew members, 133 passengers, 33 Polish guards and 1,394 Italian POWs), though some estimates agree that the death toll was as high as 1,757. More people lost their lives on the Laconia than on the Titanic.

Amongst the French ships involved in the rescue were Annamite, Dumont-d'Urville, and Gloire.

== Media ==
On 6 and 7 January 2011, BBC2 in the United Kingdom broadcast The Sinking of the Laconia, a two-part dramatisation of the sinking of Laconia. The sinking of the RMS Laconia was featured in the Animal Planet show River Monsters, in an episode called "Killers from the Abyss", which investigated the shark attacks on the survivors of the sinking.

== See also ==
- Maritime disasters
- List of ships sunk by submarines by death toll
