= The Sinking of the Laconia =

- UK DVD cover
- Genre: Drama
- Written by: Alan Bleasdale
- Directed by: Uwe Janson
- Starring: Andrew Buchan; Brian Cox; Ken Duken; Lindsay Duncan; Matthias Koeberlin; Thomas Kretschmann; Frederick Lau; Morven Christie; Franka Potente; Ludovico Fremont
- Countries of origin: United Kingdom; Germany
- Original languages: English & German
- No. of episodes: 2x90 minutes

Production
- Producers: Hilary Norrish; Stefan Sasse
- Running time: 180 minutes

Original release
- Network: BBC2
- Release: 6 January – 7 January 2011

The Sinking of the Laconia is a two-part television film, first aired on 6 and 7 January 2011 on BBC Two, about the Laconia incident: the sinking of the British ocean liner RMS Laconia during World War II by a German U-boat, which then, together with three other U-boats and an Italian submarine, rescued the passengers but was in turn attacked by an American bomber.

The film is a British–German co-production, written by Alan Bleasdale, directed by Uwe Janson, and with Andrew Buchan, Brian Cox, Ken Duken, Morven Christie, Lindsay Duncan, Thomas Kretschmann and Franka Potente in the leading roles. It was shot in Cape Town, South Africa.

== Plot ==
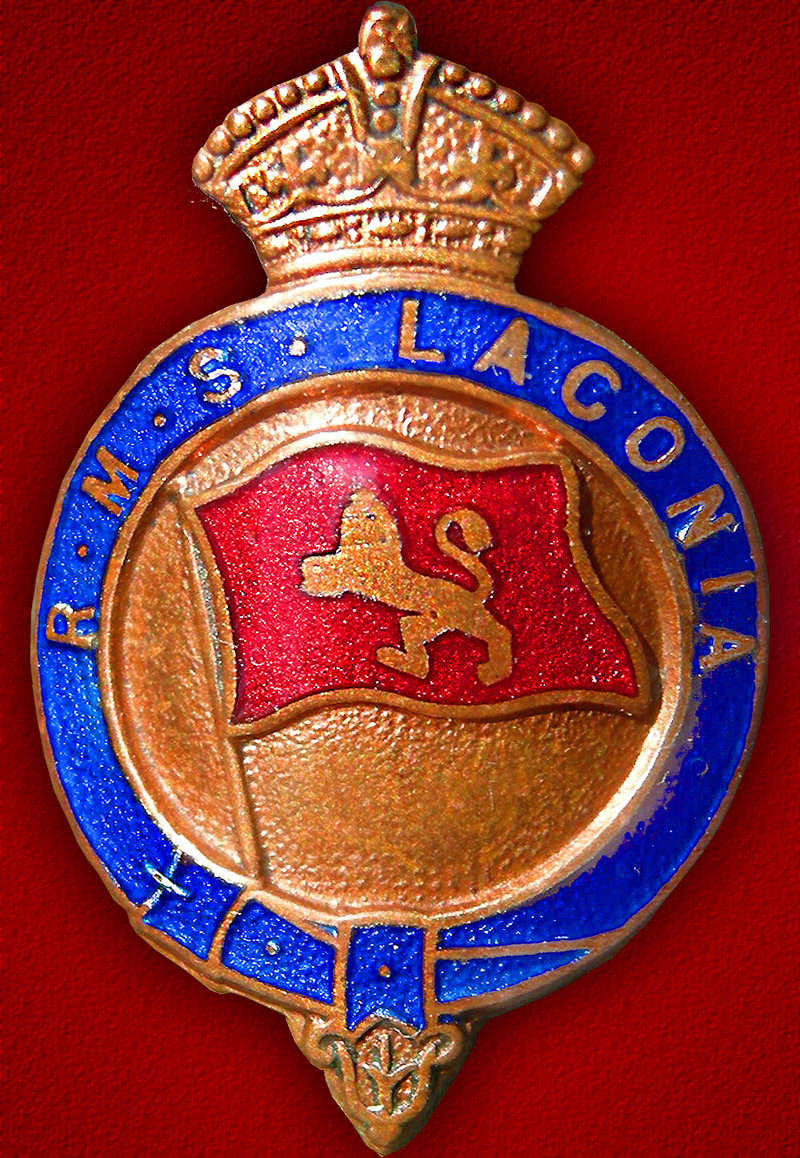
Badge of the 1921 Cunard liner Laconia

In September 1942, 650 nautical miles west of Africa, the German U-boat U-156 sinks the British troopship Laconia en route from Cape Town to the United Kingdom. (Note: Laconia carries 1,800 Italian POWs; 80 British women and children; 103 Free Poles and 268 British soldiers guarding the prisoners; and a 136-man crew; in total 2,700 people.)

Realising there are Italian POWs and civilians amongst the shipwrecked facing certain death without rescue, U-boat Commander Werner Hartenstein (Duken) defies the orders of the German Naval High Command by surfacing and ordering his men to save as many survivors as possible. U-156 crams 200 people on board the surfaced submarine, takes another 200 in tow in four lifeboats, and assists the remaining shipwrecked surrounding the U-boat in lifeboats and small rafts. When Hartenstein dives with all survivors on board, the additional weight puts the submarine into a crash dive. He regains control and surfaces again. He has a Red Cross flag displayed and a message sent to the Allies to organise the rescue of the survivors. The Italian prisoners are taken off U-156 by another U-boat and an Italian submarine. (Note: The submarine is correctly called Comandante Cappellini, which actually participated in the rescue operations)

A British request for American assistance locating Laconia survivors didn't mention the submarine's rescue effort, and a B-24 Liberator from Ascension Island attacks the submarine and U-156 resumes its patrol duties, leaving behind the lifeboats with the British survivors to be picked up by a Vichy French naval surface ship sent by Admiral Dönitz. While admiring Hartenstein's actions, Dönitz also reluctantly composes the Laconia Order to other U-boat commanders not to rescue survivors in the future. The French ship arrives and one lifeboat leaves the others, travelling independently to the coast of West Africa. A British merchant officer injured in the American attack remains with U-156 as a prisoner. Dönitz awards Hartenstein the Ritterkreuz and proposes to repost him to a headquarters staff assignment. Preferring to remain with his men, Hartenstein refuses the post and a final on-screen message reports U-156's later sinking with no survivors.

== Production ==
The production was a cooperation of the British BBC with the German ARD Degeto and SWR Fernsehen, executed by TalkbackThames and Teamworx. It was shot in Cape Town, South Africa. The idea to bring the story of the Laconia to screen was conceived in 2004 by the Talkback Thames head of drama Johnathan Young.

== Full cast ==
=== RMS Laconia ===
- Andrew Buchan - Junior Third Officer Thomas Mortimer, RMS Laconia
- Franka Potente - Hilda Smith, passenger, RMS Laconia
- Lindsay Duncan - Elisabeth Fullwood, passenger, RMS Laconia
- Brian Cox - Captain Rudolph Sharp, RMS Laconia
- David Butler - First Officer George Steel, RMS Laconia
- Morven Christie - Laura Ferguson, passenger, RMS Laconia
- Jodi Balfour - Sarah Fullwood, passenger, RMS Laconia
- Nicholas Burns - Captain Benjamin Coutts, British Army
- Ciarán McMenamin - Declan McDermott, wine steward, RMS Laconia
- Lenny Wood - Billy Hardacre, trimmer, RMS Laconia
- Ben Crompton - Harry Townes, acting leading seaman, RMS Laconia
- Matthew Aubrey - Corporal William Williams, cook, British Army
- Ludovico Fremont - Vincenzo Di Giovanni, Italian POW
- Paul Hilton - Henry Bates, passenger, RMS Laconia
- Louise Barnes - Mary Bates, passenger, RMS Laconia
- Josef du Plessis - Anthony Bates, passenger, RMS Laconia
- Rebekah Nathan - Charlotte Bates, passenger, RMS Laconia
- Richard Firth - Quartermaster John Royle, RMS Laconia
- Tom Fairfoot - William Donan, wireless operator, RMS Laconia
- Lawrence Joffe - Sergeant Ludwik Rudziński, jailor, Free Polish Army

=== U-156 ===
- Ken Duken - Korvettenkapitän Werner Hartenstein, captain, U-156
- Jacob Matschenz - Oberleutnant zur See Gert Mannesmann, 1st watch officer, U-156
- Matthias Koeberlin - Oberleutnant (Ing.) Wilhelm Rostau, chief engineer, U-156
- Jörg Malkow - Leutnant zur See Max Weber, 2nd watch officer, U-156
- Oskar Brown - Maschinengefreiter Waldemar Müller, look-out, U-156
- Frederick Lau - Funkgast Gerhard Fiedler, wireless operator, U-156
- Stefan Rudolf - Funkmaat Walter Remmert, wireless operator, U-156
- Hermanus Pieters - Matrosenobergefreiter Hans Dengler, cook, U-156

=== Royal Navy at Sierra Leone ===
- Danny Keogh - Captain Hathaway, Royal Navy
- James Alexander - Lieutenant Lincoln, Royal Navy
- Ian van der Heyden - Lieutenant Jackson, Royal Navy

=== U-boat command ===
- Thomas Kretschmann - Admiral Karl Dönitz, Befehlshaber der U-Boote
- Nikolai Kinski - Korvettenkapitän Walter Drexler, Dönitz's aide

=== US Army Air Force at Ascension Island ===
- Jannes Eiselen - Captain Robert C. Richardson III, senior operations officer, USAAF
- Grant Swanby - Colonel Robert E. Ronin, air base commander, USAAF
- Darron Meyer - Lieutenant James D. Harrower, pilot, USAAF Liberator
- Nicholas Pauling - First Sergeant Jerome Perlman, navigator, USAAF Liberator
- Charlie Keegan - Private Ches Chambers, gunner, USAAF Liberator
- Justin Shaw - Technician Fourth Grade Buck Bannister, gunner, USAAF Liberator
- Marius Botha - Private First Class Edgar Coleman, bombardier, USAAF Liberator

=== Other ===
- Simon Verhoeven - Korvettenkapitän Harro Schacht, captain, U-507
- Paul Savage - Egyptian Customs Officer

== Follow-up programme ==
On 9 January 2011, BBC Two broadcast a half-hour documentary, The Sinking of the Laconia: Survivors' Stories, featuring testimonies from the actual survivors of Laconia. Beginning 14 April 2012, Ovation television aired The Sinking of the Laconia in the United States.

== See also ==
- Laconia Order
