= War Order No. 154 =

1939 German order for unrestricted submarine warfare

War Order No. 154 was issued during World War II at the end of November or the beginning of December 1939. It was the first explicit instruction by Nazi Germany's Kriegsmarine (navy) to use the tactics of unrestricted submarine warfare.

== The order ==
The order was as follows:

...
[last paragraph] Do not rescue any men; do not take them along; and do not take care of any boats of the ship. Weather conditions and proximity of land are of no consequence. Concern yourself only with the safety of your own boat and with efforts to achieve additional successes as soon as possible. We must be hard in this war. The enemy started the war in order to destroy us, and thus nothing else matters.

== Article 22 ==
The Kriegsmarine started World War II with Prize Rules which complied with Article 22 of the First London Naval Treaty. The Third Reich was indirectly bound to the Second London Naval Treaty of 1936 by the 1935 Anglo-German Naval Agreement and the Second London Naval Treaty affirmed that Article 22 of the 1930 treaty remained in force, and that "all other Powers [were invited] to express their assent to the rules embodied in this Article."

In general, Article 22 stated that merchant vessels which did not demonstrate "persistent refusal to stop" or "active resistance" could not be sunk without the ship's crew and passengers being first delivered to a "place of safety." The ship's lifeboats were not a place of safety, unless other shipping or land was close at hand.

On the very first day of the war, SS Athenia was sunk by the German submarine U-30. Mistaking the Athenia for an "armed merchantman," no opportunity was provided to the ship's crew or passengers to be first delivered to a "place of safety."

However, in the weeks that followed, as was laid out in the transcript of Dönitz's Nuremberg Trial, both the British and the Germans issued orders to their respective fleets which quickly made any initial compliance with Article 22 less and less possible.

== Nuremberg trial ==
War Order No. 154, along with the "Laconia Order" of 1942, were introduced by the prosecution at the post-war Nuremberg Trial of Grand Admiral Karl Dönitz. In the judgment it was found that by issuing these two orders, he caused Germany to be in breach of the Second London Naval Treaty of 1936. However, as evidence of similar conduct by the Allies was presented at his trial, his sentence was not assessed on the grounds of this breach of international law.

== See also ==
- Laconia Order
- Unrestricted submarine warfare
