= Laconia incident =

War crime during the naval battles of the Second World War

Coordinates: 04°34′S 11°25′W

- Part of the Atlantic Campaign of World War II
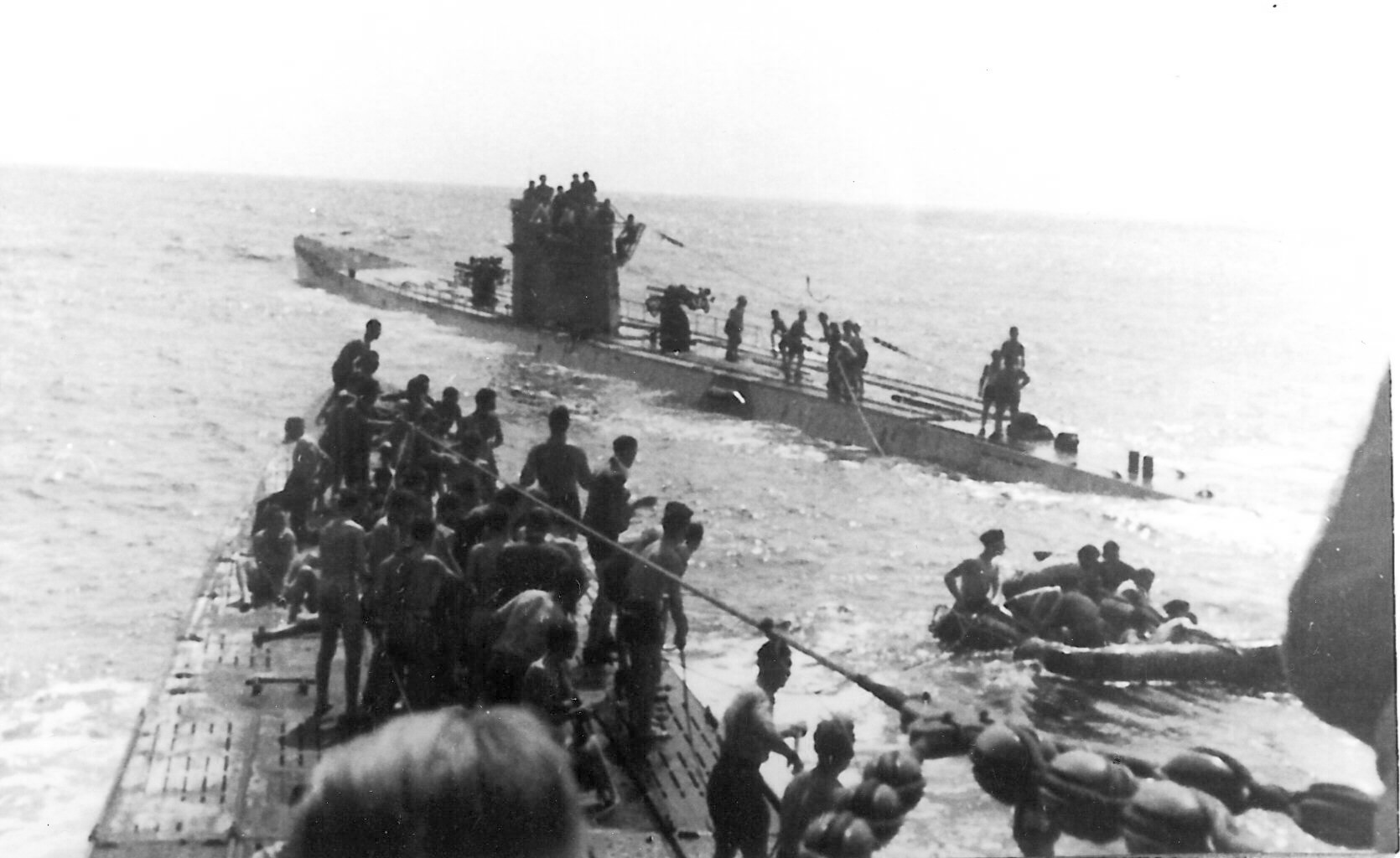
- U-156 (foreground) and U-507 pick up Laconia survivors on 15 September, three days after the attack
Date	12–24 September 1942
Location	210 km (110 nmi) NNE off Ascension
Result	Laconia Order issued by Karl Dönitz

Belligerents
United Kingdom; United States; Poland	Germany; Italy; Vichy France

Commanders and leaders
Rudolph Sharp †; Robert C. Richardson III	Werner Hartenstein; Erich Würdemann

Strength
1 armed merchant cruiser; 1 heavy bomber	4 submarines

Casualties and losses
Casualties; 133 civilians; ± 100 British crew; ± 30 Polish guards; Losses; 1 armed merchant cruiser	Casualties; ± 1,400 Italian POWs

The Laconia incident was a series of events surrounding the sinking of a British passenger ship in the Atlantic Ocean on 12 September 1942, during World War II, and a subsequent aerial attack on German and Italian submarines involved in rescue attempts. RMS Laconia, carrying at least 2,732 crew, passengers, soldiers, and prisoners of war, was torpedoed and sunk by U-156, a German U-boat, off the West African coast. Operating partly under the dictates of the old prize rules, the U-boat's commander, Korvettenkapitän Werner Hartenstein, immediately commenced rescue operations. U-156 broadcast her position on open radio channels to all Allied powers nearby, and was joined by several other U-boats in the vicinity.

After surfacing and picking up survivors, who were accommodated on the foredeck, U-156 headed on the surface under Red Cross banners to rendezvous with Vichy French ships and transfer the survivors. En route, the U-boat was spotted by a B-24 Liberator bomber of the United States Army Air Forces. The aircrew, having reported the U-boat's location, declared intentions, and the presence of survivors, were then ordered to attack the sub. The B-24 killed dozens of Laconia's survivors with bombs and strafing attacks, forcing U-156 to cast into the sea the remaining survivors that she had rescued and crash dive to avoid being destroyed.

Rescue operations were continued by other vessels. Another U-boat, U-506, was also attacked by U.S. aircraft and forced to dive. A total of 976 to 1,083 people were eventually rescued; however, 1,658 to 1,757 were killed, mostly Italian POWs. The event changed the general attitude of Germany's naval personnel towards rescuing stranded Allied seamen. The commanders of the Kriegsmarine were quickly issued the Laconia Order by Grand Admiral Karl Dönitz, which specifically forbade any such attempt and ushered in unrestricted submarine warfare for the remainder of the war.

The B-24 pilots mistakenly reported they had sunk U-156, and were awarded medals for bravery. Neither the U.S. pilots nor their commander were punished or investigated, and the matter was quietly forgotten by the U.S. military. During the later Nuremberg trials, a prosecutor attempted to cite the Laconia Order as proof of war crimes by Dönitz and his submariners. The ploy backfired, causing much embarrassment to the United States after the incident's full report had emerged to the public and the reason for the "Laconia order" was known.

== RMS Laconia ==
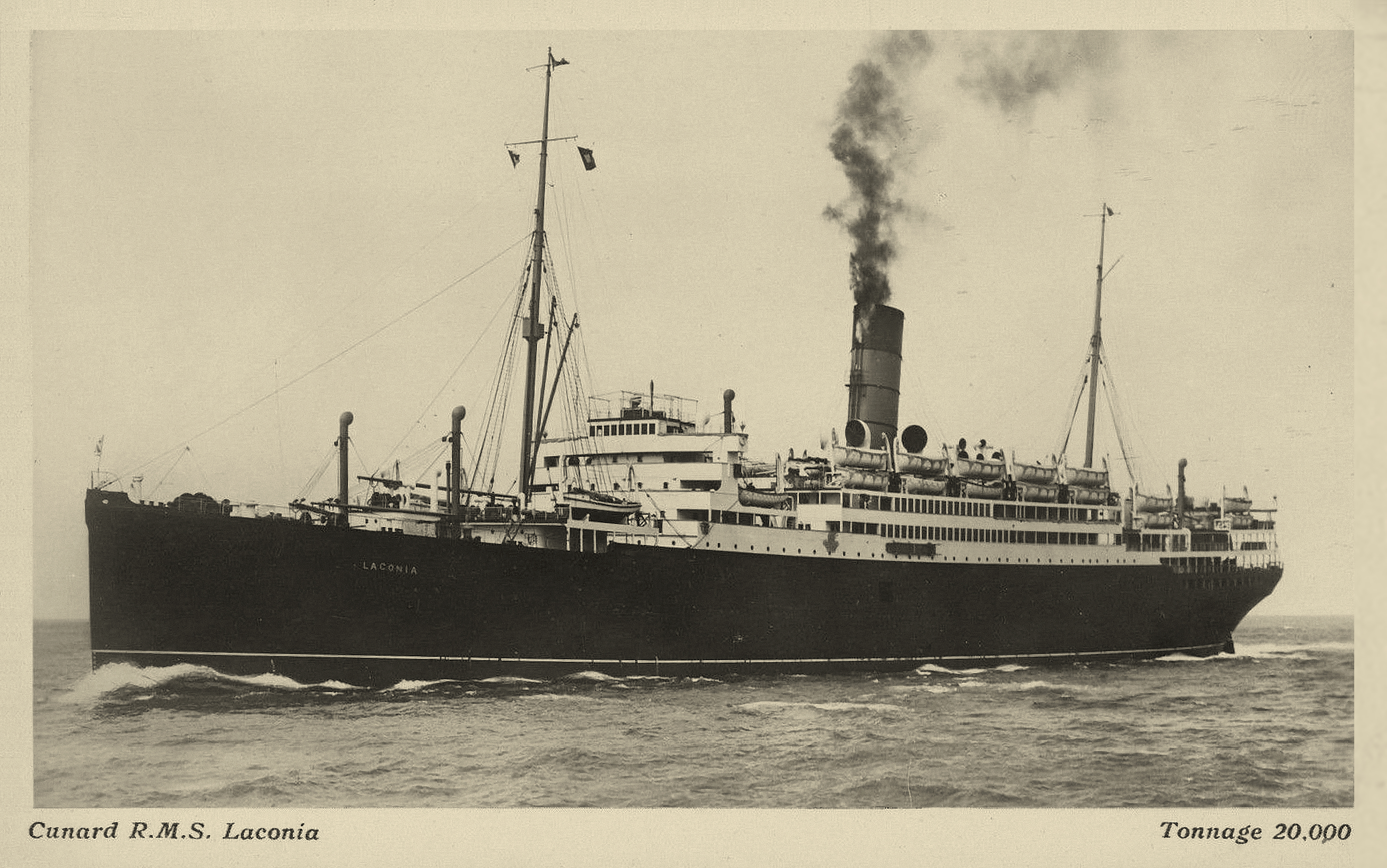
Laconia on a Cunard Line postcard c. 1921

RMS Laconia was built in 1921 as a civilian ocean liner by Swan, Hunter & Wigham Richardson Ltd, Wallsend, Northumberland. In January 1923 Laconia began the first around-the-world cruise, which lasted 130 days and called at 22 ports. On 8 September 1925, Laconia collided with the British schooner Lucia P. Dow in the Atlantic Ocean 60 nautical miles (110 kilometres) east of Nantucket, Massachusetts, United States. Laconia towed the schooner for 120 nautical miles (220 kilometres) before handing the tow over to the American tug Resolute. In 1934, her code letters were changed to GJCD. On 24 September 1934, Laconia was involved in a collision off the U.S. coast, while travelling from Boston to New York in dense fog. It rammed into the port side of Pan Royal, a U.S. freighter. Both ships suffered serious damage but were able to proceed under their own steam. Laconia returned to New York for repairs, and resumed cruising in 1935. During World War II she was requisitioned for the war effort, and by 1942 had been converted into a troopship. At the time of the incident she was transporting mostly Italian prisoners of war from Cape Town to Freetown, under the command of Captain Rudolph Sharp. The ship was carrying 463 officers and crew, at least 87 civilian women and children, 286 British military personnel (including many women and nurses), 1,809 Italian prisoners and 103 Polish soldiers acting as guards of the prisoners.

Sharp had previously commanded RMS Lancastria, which had been sunk by German bombs on 17 June 1940, off the French port of Saint-Nazaire, while taking part in Operation Aerial, the evacuation of British nationals and troops from France, two weeks after the Dunkirk evacuation.

== Events ==
=== Attack on Laconia ===
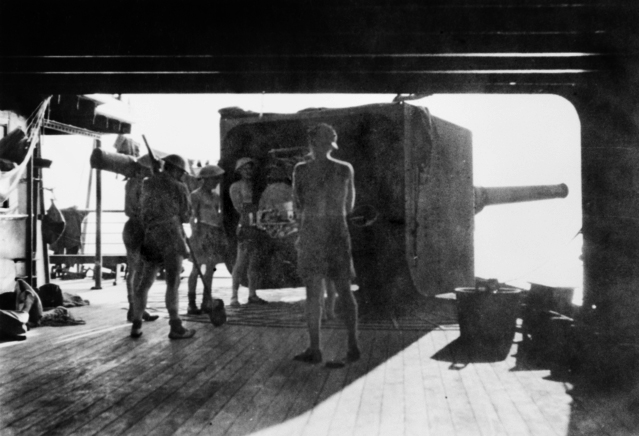
Laconia's armament, such as this BL 6-inch Mk VII naval gun, made her a legitimate target

At 10 p.m., on 12 September 1942, U-156 was on patrol off the coast of western Africa, midway between Liberia and Ascension Island. The submarine's commanding officer, Korvettenkapitän Werner Hartenstein, spotted the large British ship sailing alone and attacked it. Armed ships, which meant most merchantmen and troop transport, constituted legitimate targets for attack without warning. Armed as such, the Laconia fell into this category, and at 10:22 p.m. she transmitted a message on the 600 m (500 kHz) band: "SSS SSS 0434 South / 1125 West Laconia torpedoed." "SSS" was the code signifying "under attack by submarine". Additional messages were transmitted, but there is no record these were received by any other vessel or station.

There was not a sufficient number of lifeboats for the entire ship's complement, with author Michael J. Tougias estimating that only 2/3 of the passengers could have escaped the ship in the lifeboats, even if all were full. The heavy listing prevented half of the boats from being launched until the vessel had settled, further limiting the number of individuals who could escape. The prisoners were abandoned in the locked cargo holds as the ship sank, but most managed to escape by breaking down hatches or climbing up ventilation shafts. Several were shot when a group of prisoners rushed a lifeboat, and a large number were bayoneted to death to prevent their boarding of one of the few lifeboats available. The Polish guards were armed with rifles with fixed bayonets; however, they were not loaded and the guards carried no ammunition. Witnesses indicate that few of the prisoners were shot. Instead, most of the casualties were bayoneted.

By the time the last lifeboats were launched most survivors had already entered the water, so some lifeboats had few passengers. Only one life raft left the ship with prisoners on board; the rest jumped into the ocean. Survivors later recounted how Italians in the water were either shot or had their hands severed by axes if they tried to climb into a lifeboat. The blood soon attracted sharks. Corporal Dino Monte, one of the few Italian survivors, stated "... sharks darted among us. Grabbing an arm, biting a leg. Other larger beasts swallowed entire bodies." As Laconia was going under, bow first, U-156 surfaced to capture the ship's surviving senior officers. To their surprise, they saw over 2,000 people struggling in the water.

=== Rescue operation ===
Realising that the passengers were primarily POWs and civilians, Hartenstein immediately began rescue operations whilst flying the Red Cross flag. Laconia sank at 11:23 p.m., over an hour after the attack. At 1:25 a.m. on 13 September, Hartenstein sent a coded radio message to the Befehlshaber der U-Boote alerting them to the situation. It read: "Sunk by Hartenstein, British Laconia, Qu FF7721, 310 deg. Unfortunately with 1,500 Italian POWs; 90 fished out of the water so far. Request orders."

The head of submarine operations, Admiral Karl Dönitz, immediately ordered seven U-boats from the wolfpack Eisbär, which had been gathering to take part in a planned surprise attack on Cape Town, to divert to the scene to pick up survivors. Dönitz then informed Berlin of the situation and actions he had taken. Hitler was furious and ordered that the rescue be abandoned. Admiral Erich Raeder ordered Dönitz to disengage the Eisbär boats, which included Hartenstein's U-156, and send them to Cape Town as per the original plan. Raeder then ordered U-506, commanded by Kapitänleutnant Erich Würdemann, U-507, under Korvettenkapitän Harro Schacht, and the Italian submarine Comandante Cappellini to intercept Hartenstein to take on his survivors and then to proceed to the Laconia site and rescue any Italians they could find. Raeder also requested the Vichy French to send warships from Dakar and Ivory Coast to collect the Italian survivors from the three submarines.

The Vichy French, in response, sent the 7,600-ton cruiser Gloire from Dakar, and two sloops, the fast 660-ton Annamite and the slower 2,000-ton Dumont-d'Urville, from Conakry, French Guinea, and Cotonou, Dahomey, respectively. Dönitz disengaged the Eisbär boats and informed Hartenstein of Raeder's orders, but he substituted Kapitänleutnant Helmut Witte's U-159 for U-156 in the Eisbär group and sent the order: "All boats, including Hartenstein, only take as many men into the boat as will allow it to be fully ready for action when submerged."

U-156 was soon crammed above and below decks with nearly 200 survivors, including five women, and had another 200 in tow aboard four lifeboats. At 6 a.m. on 13 September, Hartenstein broadcast an uncoded message in English on the 25 m (82 ft) band to all shipping in the area, giving his position, requesting assistance with the rescue effort, and promising not to attack. It read: "If any ship will assist the shipwrecked Laconia crew I will not attack her, providing I am not being attacked by ship or air force. I picked up 193 men. 4°-53" South, 11°-26" West. – German submarine."

The British in Freetown intercepted this message, but, believing it might be a ruse of war, refused to credit it. Two days later, on 15 September, a message was passed to the Americans that Laconia had been torpedoed and the British merchant ship Empire Haven was en route to pick up survivors. The "poorly composed message" implied that Laconia had only been sunk that day and made no mention that the Germans were involved in a rescue attempt under a cease-fire or that neutral French ships were also en route.

U-156 remained on the surface at the scene for the next two-and-a-half days. At 11:30 a.m. on 15 September, she was joined by U-506, and a few hours later by both U-507 and the Comandante Cappellini. The four submarines, with lifeboats in tow and hundreds of survivors standing on their decks, headed for the African coastline and a rendezvous with the Vichy French surface warships that had set out from Senegal and Dahomey.

=== First American attack ===
During the night the submarines became separated. On 16 September at 11:25 a.m., U-156 was spotted by an American B-24 Liberator bomber flying from a secret airbase on Ascension. The submarine was travelling with a Red Cross flag draped across her gun deck. Hartenstein signalled to the pilot in both Morse code and English requesting assistance. A British officer also messaged the aircraft: "RAF officer speaking from German submarine, Laconia survivors on board, soldiers, civilians, women, children."

Lieutenant James D. Harden of the United States Army Air Forces did not respond to the messages; turning away, he notified his base of the situation. The senior officer on duty that day, Captain Robert C. Richardson III, who claimed that he did not know that this was a Red Cross-sanctioned German rescue operation, ordered the B-24 to "sink the sub". Richardson later claimed he believed that the rules of war at the time did not permit a combat ship to fly Red Cross flags. He feared that the German submarine would attack the two Allied freighters diverted by the British to the site. He assumed that the German submarine was rescuing only the Italian POWs. In his tactical assessment, he believed that the submarine might discover and shell the secret Ascension airfield and fuel tanks, thus cutting off a critical Allied resupply air route to British forces in Egypt and Soviet forces in Russia.

Harden flew back to the scene of the rescue effort and, at 12:32 p.m., attacked with bombs and depth charges. One landed among the lifeboats in tow behind U-156, killing dozens of survivors, while others straddled the submarine itself, causing minor damage. Hartenstein cast adrift those lifeboats still afloat and ordered the survivors on his deck into the water. The submarine submerged slowly to give those still on the deck a chance to get into the water and escape. However, survivor Doris Hawkins later estimated that of around fifty British civilians on the deck of U-156 (mostly women and children, alongside several injured men), only six besides herself were able to reach lifeboats and survive, while the others drowned. According to Harden's report, he made four runs at the submarine. On the first three the depth charges and bombs failed to release, on the fourth he dropped two bombs. The crew of the Liberator were later awarded medals for the alleged sinking of U-156, when they had in fact only sunk two lifeboats.

Ignoring Hartenstein's request that they stay in the area to be rescued by the Vichy French, two lifeboats decided to head for Africa. One, which began the journey with 68 people on board (including two women, Doris Hawkins and Lady Grizel Mary Murray), reached the African coast 27 days later with only 16 survivors (including Doris Hawkins). The other was rescued by a British trawler after 40 days at sea. Only four of its 52 occupants were still alive.

Unaware of the attack, U-507, U-506, and Cappellini continued to pick up survivors. The following morning Commander Revedin of Cappellini found that he was rescuing survivors who had been set adrift by U-156. At 11:30 a.m. Revedin received the following message: "Bordeaux to Cappellini: Reporting attack already undergone by other submarines. Be ready to submerge for action against the enemy. Put shipwrecked on rafts except women, children, and Italians, and make for minor grid-square 56 of grid-square 0971 where you will land remainder shipwrecked on to French ships. Keep British prisoners. Keep strictest watch enemy planes and submarines. End of message."

U-507 and U-506 received confirmation from headquarters of the attack on U-156 and were asked for the number of survivors rescued. Commander Schacht of U-507 replied that he had 491, of whom 15 were women and 16 were children. Commander Würdemann of U-506 confirmed 151, including nine women and children. The next message from headquarters ordered them to cast adrift all the British and Polish survivors, mark their positions and instruct them to remain exactly where they were, then proceed with all haste to the rescue rendezvous. The respective commanders chose not to cast any survivors adrift.

The order given by Richardson and the resulting attack by Harden have been called prima facie Allied war crimes. Under the conventions of war at sea, ships — including submarines — engaged in rescue operations are held to be immune from attack.

=== Second American attack ===
Five B-25s from Ascension's permanent squadron and Harden's B-24 continued to search for submarines from dawn till dusk. On 17 September, one B-25 sighted Laconia's lifeboats and informed Empire Haven of their position. Harden's B-24 sighted U-506, which had 151 survivors on board including nine women and children, and attacked. On the first run the bombs failed to drop, U-506 crash dived and on the second run the B-24 dropped two 500 lb (227 kg) bombs and two 350 lb (159 kg) depth charges but they caused no damage.

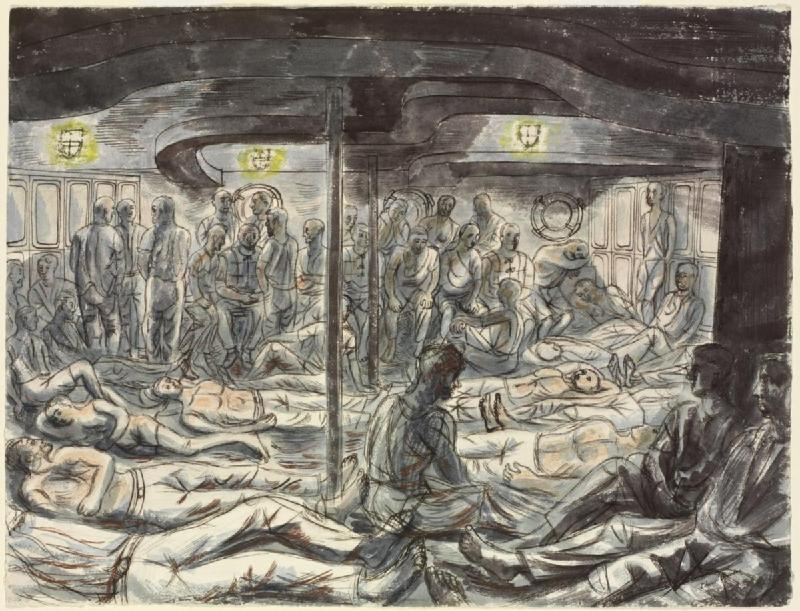
Rescued British Sailors, Soldiers, Airmen and Merchant Seamen; on the French warship Gloire by Edward Bawden

That same day, the British at Freetown sent an ambiguous message to Ascension informing them that three French ships from Dakar were en route. Captain Richardson assumed the French intended to invade Ascension so the submarine hunting was cancelled in order to prepare for an invasion.

The French cruiser Gloire picked up 52 survivors, all British, while still 100 km (54 nmi) from the rendezvous point. Gloire then met with the sloop Annamite with both meeting U-507 and U-506 at the rendezvous point at a little after 2 p.m. on 17 September. With the exception of two British officers kept aboard U-507, the survivors were all transferred to the rescue ships. Gloire sailed off on her own and within four hours rescued another 11 lifeboats. At 10 p.m., Gloire found another lifeboat and proceeded to a planned rendezvous with Annamite.

At 1 a.m., a lookout spotted a light on the horizon, which was investigated despite this meaning Gloire would not be able to make the rendezvous, and a further 84 survivors were rescued. A new rendezvous was arranged, the ships meeting at 9:30 a.m. with Annamite transferring her survivors to Gloire. A count was then taken: 373 Italians, 70 Poles and 597 British who included 48 women and children. Gloire arrived at Dakar on 21 September to resupply before sailing for Casablanca, arriving there on 25 September. On arrival, Colonel Baldwin, on behalf of all the British survivors, presented the captain of Cappellini with a letter that read as follows:

We the undersigned officers of His Majesty's Navy, Army and Air Force and of the Merchant Navy, and also on behalf of the Polish detachment, the prisoners of war, the women and children, wish to express to you our deepest and sincerest gratitude for all you have done, at the cost of very great difficulties for your ship and her crew, in welcoming us, the survivors of His Majesty's transport-ship, the Laconia.

The submarine Cappellini had been unable to find the French warships so radioed for instructions and awaited a response. The French sloop Dumont-d'Urville was sent to rendezvous with Cappellini and by chance rescued a lifeboat from the British cargo ship Trevilley, which had been torpedoed on 12 September. After searching for other Trevilley survivors without luck, Dumont-d'Urville met Cappellini on 20 September. With the exception of six Italians and two British officers, the remaining survivors were transferred to Dumont-d'Urville, which later transferred the Italians to Annamite, which transported them to Dakar on 24 September. Of Laconia's original complement of 2,741, only 1,083 survived. Of the 1,658 who died, 98 were crew members, 133 were civilian passengers, 33 were Polish guards, and 1,394 were Italian POWs.

=== Conclusion ===
From Casablanca, most of the survivors were taken to Mediouna in Morocco to await transport to a prison camp in Germany. On 8 November, the Allied invasion of North Africa began liberating the survivors, who were taken aboard the ship Anton which landed them in the United States.

Doris Hawkins, a missionary nurse, survived the Laconia incident and spent 27 days adrift in Lifeboat 9, finally coming ashore on the coast of Liberia. She was returning to England after five years in Palestine with 14-month-old Sally Kay Readman, who was lost when Hawkins' boat overturned during the sinking.

Doris Hawkins wrote a pamphlet titled "Atlantic Torpedo" after her eventual return to England, published by Victor Gollancz in 1943. In it she writes of the moments when Sally was lost: "We found ourselves on top of the arms and legs of a panic-stricken mass of humanity. The lifeboat, filled to capacity with men, women and children, was leaking badly and rapidly filling with water; at the same time it was crashing against the ship's side. Just as Sally was passed over to me, the boat filled completely and capsized, flinging us all into the water. I lost her. I did not hear her cry even then, and I am sure that God took her immediately to Himself without suffering. I never saw her again."

Doris Hawkins was one of 16 survivors (out of 68 in the lifeboat when it was cast adrift from the U-boat). She spent the remaining war years personally visiting the families of people who perished in the lifeboats she had been on board, returning mementos entrusted to her by them in their dying moments. In Doris's words, "It is impossible to imagine why I should have been chosen to survive when so many did not. I have been reluctant to write the story of our experiences, but in answer to many requests I have done so; and if it strengthens someone's faith, if it is an inspiration to any, if it brings home to others, hitherto untouched, all that 'those who go down to the sea in ships' face for our sakes, hour by hour, day by day, year in and year out—it will not have been written in vain".

Survivor Jim McLoughlin states in One Common Enemy that after the incident Hartenstein asked him if he was in the Royal Navy, which he was, then why a passenger ship was armed, stating, "If it wasn't armed, I would not have attacked." McLoughlin believes this indicates Hartenstein had thought it was a troop transport rather than a passenger ship; by signalling to the Royal Navy, Laconia was acting as a de facto auxiliary ship.

== Aftermath ==
The Laconia incident had far-reaching consequences. Until then, it was common for U-boats to assist torpedoed survivors with food, water, simple medical care for the wounded, and a compass bearing to the nearest landmass. It was extremely rare for survivors to be brought on board, as space on a U-boat was barely enough for its own crew. On 17 September 1942, in response to the incident, Admiral Karl Dönitz issued an order named Triton Null, later known as the Laconia Order. In it, Dönitz prohibited U-boat crews from attempting rescues; survivors were to be left in the sea. Nevertheless, U-boats still occasionally provided aid for survivors.

The order was as follows:

1. All efforts to save survivors of sunken ships, such as the fishing out of swimming men and putting them on board lifeboats, the righting of overturned lifeboats, or the handing over of food and water, must stop. Rescue contradicts the most basic demands of the war: the destruction of hostile ships and their crews.
2. The orders concerning the bringing-in of captains and chief engineers stay in effect.
3. Survivors are to be saved only if their statements are important for the boat.
4. Be harsh. Remember that the enemy has no regard for women and children when bombing German cities!

This order, along with War Order No. 154 of 1939, were introduced by the prosecution at the postwar Nuremberg trial of Grand Admiral Karl Dönitz at which Dönitz was indicted for war crimes, including the issuance of the Laconia Order:

The prosecution has introduced much evidence surrounding two orders of Dönitz, War Order No. 154, issued in 1939, and the so-called Laconia Order of 1942. The defense argues that these orders and the evidence supporting them do not show such a policy and introduced much evidence to the contrary. The Tribunal is of the opinion that the evidence does not establish with the certainty required that Dönitz deliberately ordered the killing of shipwrecked survivors. The orders were undoubtedly ambiguous and deserve the strongest censure.

At the Nuremberg trials held by the Allies in 1946, Dönitz was indicted for war crimes. The issuance of the Laconia Order was the centrepiece of the prosecution case, a decision that backfired badly. Its introduction allowed the defence to recount at length the numerous instances in which German submariners acted with humanity where in similar situations the Allies behaved callously. Dönitz pointed out that the order was a direct result of this callousness and the attack by U.S. aircraft on a rescue operation.

The Americans had also practised unrestricted submarine warfare, under their own equivalent to the Laconia Order, which had been in force since they entered the war. Fleet Admiral Chester W. Nimitz, the wartime commander-in-chief of the U.S. Pacific Fleet, provided unapologetic written testimony on Dönitz's behalf at his trial that the United States Navy had waged unrestricted submarine warfare in the Pacific against Japan from the very first day the United States entered the war. This testimony led the Nuremberg Tribunal not to impose a sentence upon Dönitz for this breach of law, even though he was convicted of the count.

The prosecution has introduced much evidence surrounding two orders of Dönitz, War Order No. 154, issued in 1939, and the so-called Laconia Order of 1942. The defence argues that these orders and the evidence supporting them do not show such a policy and introduced much evidence to the contrary. The Tribunal is of the opinion that the evidence does not establish with the certainty required that Dönitz deliberately ordered the killing of shipwrecked survivors. The orders were undoubtedly ambiguous and deserve the strongest censure.

The evidence further shows that the rescue provisions were not carried out and that the defendant ordered that they should not be carried out. The argument of the defence is that the security of the submarine is, as the first rule of the sea, paramount to rescue and that the development of aircraft made rescue impossible. This may be so, but the [Second London Naval Treaty] is explicit. If the commander cannot rescue, then under its terms he cannot sink a merchant vessel and should allow it to pass harmless before his periscope. The orders, then, prove Dönitz is guilty of a violation of the Protocol.

In view of all the facts proved and in particular of an order of the British Admiralty announced on 8 May 1940, according to which all vessels should be sunk on sight in the Skagerrak, and the answers to interrogatories by Admiral Chester Nimitz stating unrestricted submarine warfare was carried on in the Pacific Ocean by the United States from the first day of the Pacific War, the sentence of Dönitz is not assessed on the ground of his breaches of the international law of submarine warfare.

The Naval War College series International Law Studies covers interpretations of international law during armed conflicts and how these laws were applied by each party. In volume 65, Targeting Enemy Merchant Shipping, chapter three contains an examination of the Laconia incident in the context of the application of international law to World War II submarine warfare:

The person who issued the order to attack and the aircraft commander who carried it out are both prima facie guilty of a war crime. The conduct of the aircraft commander appears to be entirely inexcusable since he must have observed the rescue operation. During the time that they are engaged in such an operation, enemy submarines are no longer lawful objects of attack. The fact that the United States Army Air Forces took no action to investigate this incident, and that no trials took place under the then-effective domestic criminal code, the Articles of War, is a serious reflection on the entire chain of military command.

Another consequence of the incident was an order by Churchill that in future transports, there were to be no more than 500 prisoners on any one ship.

== Media ==
On 6 and 7 January 2011, BBC2 in the United Kingdom broadcast The Sinking of the Laconia, a two-part dramatisation of the sinking of Laconia.

== Bibliography ==
- Blair, C. (1998). The Hunted, 1942–1945. Hitler's U-boat War: The German Navy in World War II. Vol. 2. New York: Random House. ISBN 9780679457428.
- Bridgland, T. (2001). Waves of Hate: Naval Atrocities of the Second World War. Barnsley: Pen and Sword Books. ISBN 9780850528220.
- Dönitz, K. (1997). Memoirs: Ten Years and Twenty Days. Boston: Da Capo Press. ISBN 9780306807640.
- Duffy, J. P. (2013). The Sinking of the Laconia and the U-Boat War. Lincoln: University of Nebraska Press. ISBN 9780803245402.
- Grattidge, H.; et al. (1956). Captain of the Queens: The Autobiography of Captain Harry Grattidge. Boston: Dutton. OCLC 971994348.
- Haarr, G. (2013). The Gathering Storm: The Naval War in Northern Europe September 1939 – April 1940. Barnsley: Seaforth. ISBN 9781848321403.
- Hawkins, D. (1943). Atlantic Torpedo: The record of 27 days in an open boat following a U-boat sinking. London: Victor Gollancz Ltd. OCLC 669028193.
- Hood, J. (2006). Come Hell and High Water: Extraordinary Stories of Wreck, Terror and Triumph on the Sea. Ithaca: Burford Books. ISBN 9781580801430.
- Mallison, Sally V.; Mallison, W. Thomas (1993). "The Naval Practices of Belligerents in World War II: Legal Criteria and Development". In Grunawalt, Richard J. (ed.). Targeting Enemy Merchant Shipping. Proceedings of the Symposium on the Law of Naval Warfare, Newport, R.I., Feb. 1990 (PDF). International Law Studies "Blue Book" series, № 65. Newport, R.I.: Naval War College. pp. 87–103.
- Maurer, M.; et al. (1964). "Origin of the Laconia Order". Royal United Serv. Inst. J. 109 (636): 338–344. doi:10.1080/03071846409419737.
- McLoughlin, J. (2006). One Common Enemy: The Laconia Incident: A Survivor's Memoir. Adelaide: Wakefield Press. ISBN 9781862546905.
- Peillard, L. (1983) [1963]. U-boats to The Rescue: The Laconia Affair (repr. Bantam Books, NY ed.). New York: G. P. Putnam's Sons. ISBN 9780553230703.

Other sources

- "Casualty Details: Readman, Sally Kay". Commonwealth War Graves Commission.
