= Erich Würdemann =

German World War II U-boat commander

- Born: 15 January 1914; Hamburg, German Empire
- Died: 14 July 1943 (aged 29); U-506, North Atlantic off Vigo, Spain
- Military career
- Allegiance: Nazi Germany
- Branch: Kriegsmarine
- Service years: 1933–43
- Rank: Kapitänleutnant
- Units: Paul Jacobi; U-43; 10th U-boat Flotilla
- Commands: U-506
- Awards: Knight's Cross of the Iron Cross

Erich Würdemann (15 January 1914 – 14 July 1943) was a German submarine commander in World War II and recipient of the Knight's Cross of the Iron Cross of Nazi Germany.

== Career ==
In April 1933, Würdemann joined the Reichsmarine, which became the Kriegsmarine two years later. During the first year of the war he served on the destroyer Paul Jacobi, before transferring to the U-boat force in November 1940. After the usual training he served for one patrol aboard U-43 under Wolfgang Lüth, before commissioning the Type IXC U-boat U-506 in September 1941. He sailed on 5 war patrols, sank 15 merchant ships for a total of 76,714 gross register tons (GRT) and damaged 3 ships of a combined 23,358 GRT.

Würdemann's most successful patrol (his second) took him into the Gulf of Mexico in May 1942, where he sank nine ships and damaged three. His next patrol took him to the waters off West Africa, where he sank another five ships and was involved in the Laconia incident. After U-156 sank the passenger liner RMS Laconia, which was carrying 450 British and Polish soldiers and about 1,800 Italian prisoners of war, the U-boat commenced rescue operations, and was joined by others in the area, including U-506; but the U-boats were later attacked by an American aircraft, which resulted in Admiral Dönitz issuing an order to the Navy not to pick up survivors.

Würdemann sailed to the waters off South Africa in early 1943 and sank two more ships. Finally, on 14 July 1943, six days into his fifth patrol, Würdemann was killed, along with all but six of his crew, when U-506 was sunk in the Atlantic west of Vigo, Spain by depth charges dropped from a Consolidated B-24 Liberator of the United States Army Air Forces' 1st Antisubmarine Squadron.

== Awards ==
- Wehrmacht Long Service Award 4th Class (1 April 1937)
- Iron Cross (1939)
  - 2nd Class (16 April 1940)
  - 1st Class (18 June 1942)
- Destroyer War Badge (23 October 1940)
- U-boat War Badge (1939) (26 March 1942)
- Knight's Cross of the Iron Cross on 14 March 1943 as Kapitänleutnant and commander of U-506
