= German submarine U-506 =

German World War II submarine

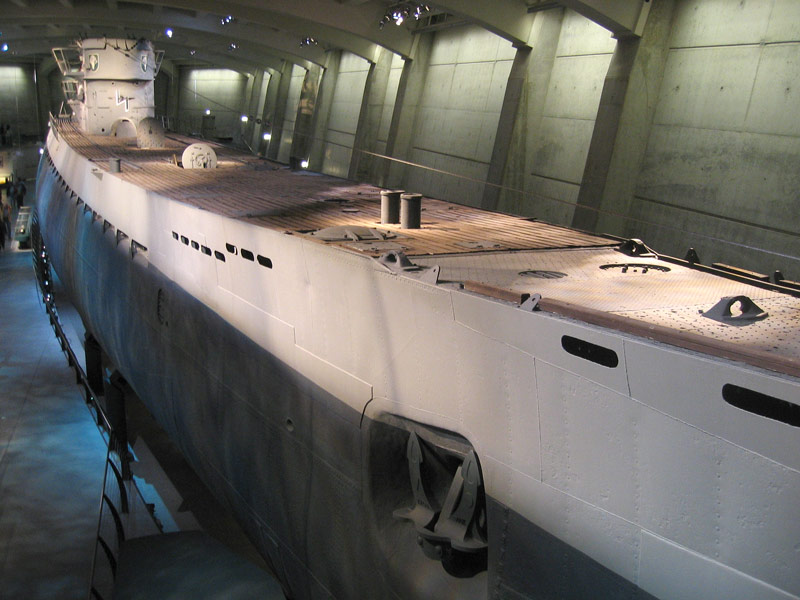
- U-505, a typical Type IXC boat

History

Nazi Germany
- Name: U-506
- Ordered: 25 September 1939
- Builder: Deutsche Werft, Hamburg
- Yard number: 296
- Laid down: 11 July 1940
- Launched: 20 June 1941
- Commissioned: 15 September 1941
- Fate: Sunk on 12 July 1943

General characteristics
- Class & type: Type IXC submarine
- Displacement: 1,120 t (1,100 long tons) surfaced; 1,232 t (1,213 long tons) submerged
- Length: 76.76 m (251 ft 10 in) o/a; 58.75 m (192 ft 9 in) pressure hull
- Beam: 6.76 m (22 ft 2 in) o/a; 4.40 m (14 ft 5 in) pressure hull
- Height: 9.60 m (31 ft 6 in)
- Draught: 4.70 m (15 ft 5 in)
- Installed power: 4,400 PS (3,200 kW; 4,300 bhp) (diesels); 1,000 PS (740 kW; 990 shp) (electric)
- Propulsion: 2 shafts; 2 × diesel engines; 2 × electric motors
- Speed: 18.2 knots (33.7 km/h; 20.9 mph) surfaced; 7.7 knots (14.3 km/h; 8.9 mph) submerged
- Range: 13,450 nmi (24,910 km; 15,480 mi) at 10 knots (19 km/h; 12 mph) surfaced; 64 nmi (119 km; 74 mi) at 4 knots (7.4 km/h; 4.6 mph) submerged
- Test depth: 230 m (750 ft)
- Complement: 4 officers, 44 enlisted
- Armament: 6 × torpedo tubes (4 bow, 2 stern); 22 × 53.3 cm (21 in) torpedoes; 1 × 10.5 cm (4.1 in) SK C/32 deck gun (180 rounds); 1 × 3.7 cm (1.5 in) SK C/30 AA gun; 1 × twin 2 cm FlaK 30 AA guns

Service record
- Part of: 4th U-boat Flotilla; 15 September 1941 – 31 January 1942; 10th U-boat Flotilla; 1 February 1942 – 12 July 1943
- Identification codes: M 18 799
- Commanders: Kptlt. Erich Würdemann; 15 September 1941 – 12 July 1943
- Operations: 5 patrols: 1st patrol: 9 – 25 March 1942; 2nd patrol: 6 April – 15 June 1942; 3rd patrol: 28 July – 7 November 1942; 4th patrol: 14 December 1942 – 8 May 1943; 5th patrol: 6 – 12 July 1943
- Victories: 14 merchant ships sunk (69,893 GRT); 1 merchant ship total loss (6,821 GRT); 3 merchant ships damaged (23,358 GRT)

German submarine U-506 was a Type IXC U-boat of Nazi Germany's Kriegsmarine during World War II. The submarine was laid down on 11 July 1940 at the Deutsche Werft yard in Hamburg as yard number 296, launched on 20 June 1941 and commissioned on 15 September 1941 under the command of Kapitänleutnant Erich Würdemann.

After completing her training with the 4th U-boat Flotilla based at Stettin, U-506 was transferred to the 10th U-boat Flotilla for front-line service on 1 February 1942. She sank 14 ships, three were classified as 'damaged' another vessel was declared a 'total loss'. The submarine's missions, particularly the sinking of the merchant ship Heredia and later involvement in the so-called Laconia Incident is chronicled in the 2016 book So Close to Home.

She was sunk in the Atlantic on 12 July 1943 by depth charges dropped by a US B-24 Liberator.

== Design ==
German Type IXC submarines were slightly larger than the original Type IXBs. U-506 had a displacement of 1,120 tonnes (1,100 long tons) when at the surface and 1,232 tonnes (1,213 long tons) while submerged. The U-boat had a total length of 76.76 m (251 ft 10 in), a pressure hull length of 58.75 m (192 ft 9 in), a beam of 6.76 m (22 ft 2 in), a height of 9.60 m (31 ft 6 in), and a draught of 4.70 m (15 ft 5 in). The submarine was powered by two MAN M 9 V 40/46 supercharged four-stroke, nine-cylinder diesel engines producing a total of 4,400 metric horsepower (3,240 kW; 4,340 shp) for use while surfaced, two Siemens-Schuckert 2 GU 345/34 double-acting electric motors producing a total of 1,000 shaft horsepower (1,010 PS; 750 kW) for use while submerged. She had two shafts and two 1.92 m (6 ft) propellers. The boat was capable of operating at depths of up to 230 metres (750 ft).

The submarine had a maximum surface speed of 18.3 knots (33.9 km/h; 21.1 mph) and a maximum submerged speed of 7.3 knots (13.5 km/h; 8.4 mph). When submerged, the boat could operate for 63 nautical miles (117 km; 72 mi) at 4 knots (7.4 km/h; 4.6 mph); when surfaced, she could travel 13,450 nautical miles (24,910 km; 15,480 mi) at 10 knots (19 km/h; 12 mph). U-506 was fitted with six 53.3 cm (21 in) torpedo tubes (four fitted at the bow and two at the stern), 22 torpedoes, one 10.5 cm (4.13 in) SK C/32 naval gun, 180 rounds, and a 3.7 cm (1.5 in) SK C/30 as well as a 2 cm (0.79 in) C/30 anti-aircraft gun. The boat had a complement of forty-eight.

== Service history ==
=== First patrol ===
U-506 first departed Hamburg on 2 March 1942 and sailed to Heligoland, leaving there on 9 March for her first patrol, which took her around the British Isles to Lorient in occupied France via the gap between the Shetland and Faeroe Islands, by 25 March.

=== Second patrol ===
The U-boat sailed from Lorient on 6 April 1942, crossed the Atlantic, and entered the Gulf of Mexico to operate off the Mississippi River Delta against the crucial oil trade. En route she sank a Nicaraguan merchant ship off the southern tip of Florida. Between 10 and 20 May she sank three American oil tankers and a banana boat, and damaged four other oil tankers, one so badly it was declared a total loss. On the return journey she sank two British merchant ships off the Bahamas, eventually returning to Lorient on 15 June.

=== Third patrol ===
U-506 sailed from Lorient once again on 28 July 1942 and headed south to the coast of West Africa, operating against ships sailing from Freetown, Sierra Leone. There she sank five more merchant ships, four British, one Swedish. On the return journey the U-boat took part in the rescue operations after the sinking of the RMS Laconia, before returning to Lorient on 7 November after 103 days at sea.

=== Fourth patrol ===
The U-boat sailed from Lorient on 14 December 1942 and again headed south, this time to the coast of South Africa, where she sank two merchant ships, one British, the other Norwegian, before returning to base on 8 May. She was away even longer than on her third patrol-146 days.

=== Fifth patrol ===
U-506's final voyage began on 6 July 1943. On 12 July the U-boat was attacked by a USAAF B-24 Liberator bomber of the 1st Anti-Submarine Squadron in the North Atlantic west of Vigo, Spain, in position 42°30′N 16°30′W. The U-boat was located by the aircraft's SC137 10 cm radar, which the Germans could not detect, and was attacked with seven depth charges. The U-boat broke in two, and about 15 men were seen in the water by the pilot, who dropped a liferaft and a smoke flare. Only six men were rescued by a British destroyer three days later.

== Summary of raiding history ==
Date	Ship Name	Nationality	Tonnage (GRT)	Fate
3 May 1942	Sama	Nicaragua	567	Sunk
10 May 1942	Aurora	United States	7,050	Damaged
13 May 1942	Gulfpenn	United States	8,862	Sunk
14 May 1942	David McKelvy	United States	6,821	Total loss
16 May 1942	Sun	United States	9,002	Damaged
16 May 1942	William C. McTarnahan	United States	7,306	Damaged
17 May 1942	Gulfoil	United States	5,189	Sunk
19 May 1942	Heredia	United States	4,732	Sunk
20 May 1942	Halo	United States	6,986	Sunk
20 May 1942	Yorkmoor	United Kingdom	4,457	Sunk
31 May 1942	Fred W. Green	United Kingdom	2,292	Sunk
21 August 1942	City of Wellington	United Kingdom	5,733	Sunk
23 August 1942	Hamla	United Kingdom	4,416	Sunk
5 September 1942	Myrmidon	United Kingdom	6,278	Sunk
13 September 1942	Lima	Sweden	3,764	Sunk
23 September 1942	Siam II	United Kingdom	6,637	Sunk
7 March 1943	Sabor	United Kingdom	5,212	Sunk
9 March 1943	Tabor	Norway	4,768	Sunk

== Bibliography ==
- Busch, Rainer; Röll, Hans-Joachim (1999). German U-boat commanders of World War II : a biographical dictionary. Translated by Brooks, Geoffrey. London, Annapolis, Md: Greenhill Books, Naval Institute Press. ISBN 1-55750-186-6.
- Busch, Rainer; Röll, Hans-Joachim (1999). Deutsche U-Boot-Verluste von September 1939 bis Mai 1945 [German U-boat losses from September 1939 to May 1945]. Der U-Boot-Krieg (in German). Vol. IV. Hamburg, Berlin, Bonn: Mittler. ISBN 3-8132-0514-2.
- Gröner, Erich; Jung, Dieter; Maass, Martin (1991). U-boats and Mine Warfare Vessels. German Warships 1815–1945. Vol. 2. Translated by Thomas, Keith; Magowan, Rachel. London: Conway Maritime Press. ISBN 0-85177-593-4.
- Kemp, Paul (1999). U-Boats Destroyed - German Submarine Losses in the World Wars. London: Arms & Armour. ISBN 1-85409-515-3.
- Tougias, Michael (3 May 2016). So Close to Home: The True Story of an American Family's Fight for Survival in WWII. New York: Pegasus Books. ISBN 978-1681771304.
