= Wolfpack Eisbär =

German U-boat force

Atlantic campaign
- Part of Second World War
- South Africa in the South Atlantic and Indian Ocean (Ascension Island in the Atlantic Ocean in red)
Date	23 August 1942 – January 1943
Location	South Atlantic; Indian Ocean
Result	Axis victory

Belligerents
Germany; Kingdom of Italy	United Kingdom; Union of South Africa

Commanders and leaders
Karl Dönitz	Sir Campbell Tait

Units involved
Gruppe Eisbär; 4 × Type IXD2 submarines; 1 × Regia Marina Cagni-class submarine	South African and British air and naval forces

Strength
9 submarines	Eastern Fleet: 4 destroyers, several corvettes; 4 Catalina ASW aircraft; +6 more destroyers, 4 corvettes; Western Approaches: 12 ASW trawlers; US waters: 18 ASW trawlers (December)

Casualties and losses
67 killed; 1 U-boat	c. 2,690 killed; 28 Merchant ships

Gruppe Eisbär
- Operational scope: Operation
- Planned by: Kriegsmarine
- Objective: Attacks on merchant ships off South Africa
- Date: Began 23 August 1942
- Executed by: Gruppe Eisbär

Gruppe Eisbär (Group Polar Bear) was a force of German U-boats that operated from 23 August 1942 in the South Atlantic during the Second World War. The group was to operate off Cape Town, which was considered to be vulnerable. Some of the most experienced U-boat commanders including Harald Gelhaus, Werner Hartenstein and Carl Emmermann participated in the operation.

During the voyage south, the group temporarily was diverted to attack Convoy SL 119 that had been attacked by gruppe Iltis. U-156 sank Clan Macwhirter (5,941 GRT) on 27 August and sank the liner RMS Laconia on 12 September, which began the Laconia Incident. U-156 was replaced in gruppe Eisbär by U-159 and the group was redirected to the waters around South Africa.

The Allies were preoccupied with Operation Torch and the campaign in north-west Africa, giving priority to the protection of troop convoys that left the Allied navies with few escort vessels to reinforce the South Atlantic Station. Merchant ships were sent to Durban instead of Cape Town and routed far to the south, across the South Atlantic to South America, thence to sail up the east coast, crossing the Atlantic from the US to Britain.

Gruppe Eisbär sank 23 ships (155,335 GRT) off Cape Town and Durban along and eleven ships (60,829 GRT) in transit, for the loss of U-179. The 34 ships sunk (216,164 GRT) averaged 8.5 ships (54,041 GRT) per boat, one of the most successful U-boat operations of the war. The U-cruisers sank 27 ships of 161,407 GRT, an average of 6.75 ships per U-boat (40,350 GRT). Ammiraglio Cagni sank one ship making 28 ships and 163,400 GRT. About 2,690 crew, passengers, Italian internees and military personnel on the ships were killed.

== Background ==
=== Kriegsmarine ===
From mid-July 1942, to tie down Allied convoy escorts and to sink more ships in distant waters, four to six U-boats and a U-tanker operated in the middle-Atlantic, west of Freetown in Sierra Leone. On 7 August, a U-boat was allowed freedom of manoeuvre to commit reprisals against Brazil for its support of the Allied naval war, despite its neutral status but this gave Brazil a pretext to declare war on 28 August. As in 1941, an extension of operations to the South Atlantic was planned by the Naval War Staff (Seekriegsleitung, SKL) for the summer of 1942, to exert strategic pressure.

5th parallel south (interactive map)

The sudden appearance of a U-boat group off South Africa was to inhibit the transport of Allied reinforcements to the Middle East and interrupt trade with India. To deny the Allies time for counter-measures, SKL wanted to conceal the voyage of the boats to the south for as long as possible. The U-boat commanders received orders to avoid contact with all merchant ships south of the Equator and only to attack valuable targets such as big warships.

Rear-Admiral (Konteradmiral) Karl Dönitz the commander, U-boats (Befehlshaber der U-Boote BdU) disagreed with SKL because the strategic pressure that could be exerted was insufficient justification for a long-range operation. Dönitz wanted priority to remain with the tonnage war, with sinkings as the measure of success. The southern voyage of the boat should be used offensively, as far as 15° South. SKL, basing its strategic calculations on the widening war, refuse to relent until 6 September, when gruppe Eisbär received freedom of action against merchant shipping as far as 5° South.

At a review of naval operations in September 1942, Dönitz described to Hitler the declining prospects for U-boat operations off the east coast of the US, due to the introduction of convoys and increased air reconnaissance. The U-boats were to return to the North Atlantic, the coast of West Africa and to Cape Town in the South Atlantic. In 1941 the Germans had attempted to attack ships around South Africa but were defeated by the interception of German U-boat supply ships. For operations in 1942, Dönitz had available long-range Type IX submarines and supply boats to substitute for commerce raiders used earlier in the war. In mid-August the four Type IXC U-boats of gruppe Eisbär had sailed from France, followed at intervals by a second wave of four of the new and larger Type IXD2 submarines.

==== German plan ====
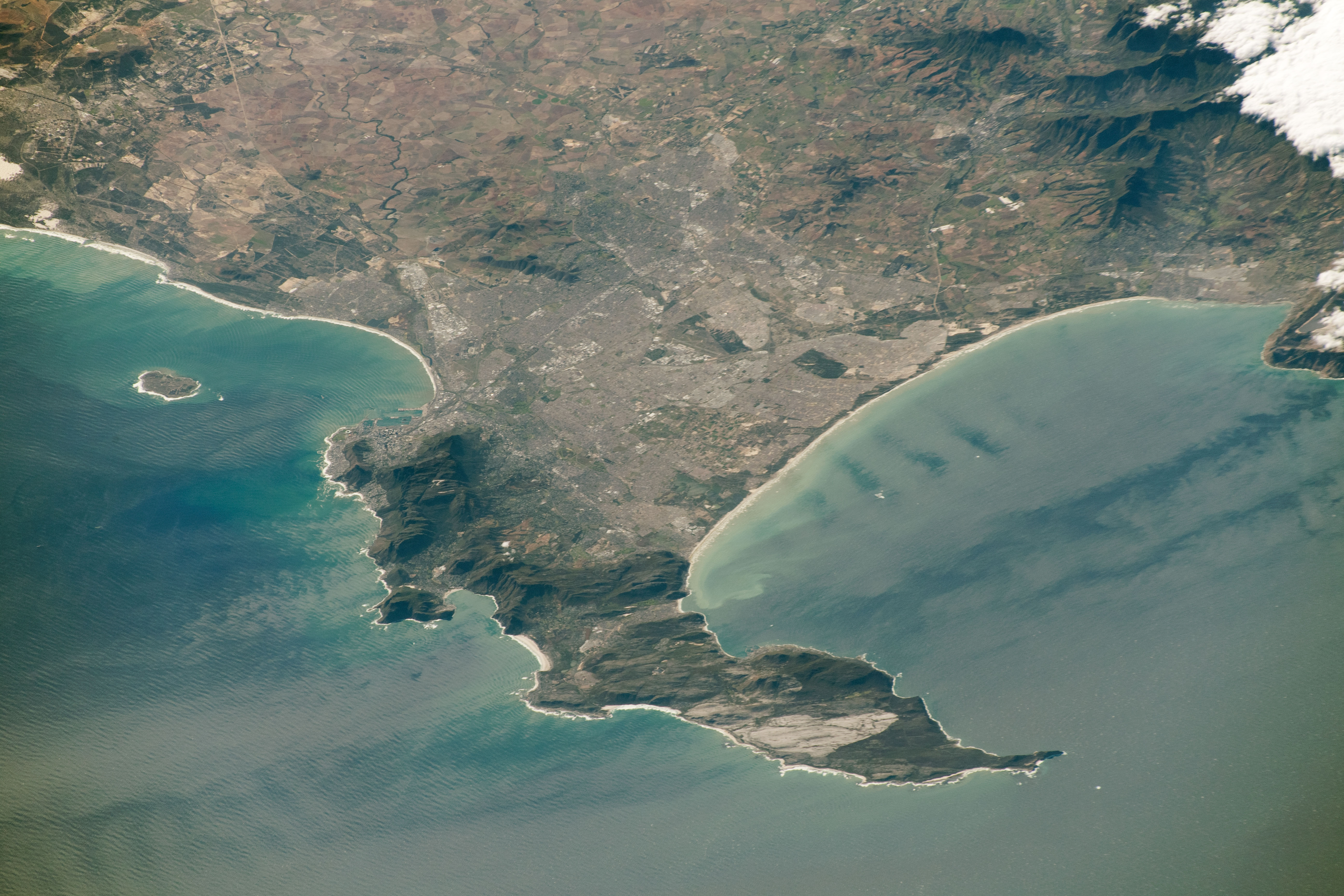
Photograph of Cape Town showing the Cape Peninsula and Table Bay (centre left) from the International Space Station

Dönitz and the commanders due to operate in Gruppe Eisbär intended that around 5 October 1942, U-68 (Karl-Friedrich Merten) and U-172 (Carl Emmermann) would conduct a reconnaissance of Table Bay near Cape Town, getting past the minefield sown by the German commerce raider Doggerbank (Schiff 53) earlier in the year and the defensive minefields laid by the British, using captured charts. In the early hours of 8 October, during the new moon, an attack on the expected 50 ships anchored there would be made. Outside the bay, U-159, U-504 and U-179 would lie in ambush for fleeing ships. The boats might then raid the Indian Ocean, depending on circumstances.

=== Royal Navy ===
==== Submarine Tracking Room ====
At the tracking room at the Admiralty, Commander Rodger Winn, kept watch over the deployment of U-boats and on 2 August, before the departure of the four Type IXC U-boats of Gruppe Eisbär, Winn speculated that the U-boats off Freetown and a possible move to Ascension Island might foreshadow a move further south. Winn thought that the departure of Gruppe Eisbär and its Milch Cow support boat, was for operations in far waters; Winn guessed that they were bound for the waters off South Africa. The departure of Gruppe Eisbär in mid-August and the sailing at intervals of four of the new and larger U-cruisers of the Type IXD2 class from 21 September, bore out Winn's analysis when RMS Laconia was sunk on 12 September and U-156 began signalling for assistance on the international frequency. Survivors rescued by U-boats were transferred to Vichy rescue ships; Winn thought that the attack on Laconia was not conclusive but on 21 September, he warned the Commander-in-Chief South Atlantic, that the arrival of U-boats in the south 'seemed imminent'. On 28 September Winn reported that the whereabouts of the U-boats was unknown but that two fishermen had reported seeing the landing of men from a U-boat about 200 nmi (370 km; 230 mi) north of Cape Town.

In early October, in a blunder by the censor, German news reported that U-boats were operating in the Far East. On 5 October, Winn reported that by mid-October, U-boats might operate in the Mozambique Channel and two days later a ship was sunk off Cape Town. The Admiralty and the Commander-in-Chief South Atlantic had reduced the shipping at Cape Town by making Durban, on the east coast, the last stop for ships bound for Britain from the Indian Ocean. For the duration of Operation Torch (8–12 November), ships were routed far to the south of Cape Town and then north-west to Brazil, Trinidad and the US, to join convoys across the north Atlantic. Unknown to the British, gruppe Eisbär was not going to operate as a rudel (pack) in the South Atlantic but to disperse after the raid on Table Bay.

==== South Atlantic Station ====
In late 1942, the demands of Operation Torch, especially the duration of the campaign in Algeria and Tunisia, that ended in May 1943 and required more supplies from more convoys, stretched the Allied escort effort. The west Africa–south Africa–east Africa route continued without convoy for much longer; ships were sent on devious courses to evade U-boats but they had eventually to cross the South Atlantic. The naval forces of the Commander-in-Chief, South Atlantic (Vice-Admiral Sir Campbell Tait) were not adequate for an anti-U-boat campaign. Four destroyers and a few corvettes were based at Cape Town on loan from the Eastern Fleet based at Mombasa. There were not enough escorts or aircraft to convoy ships on the Cape to Freetown route up the west coast of Africa or the Cape to Suez route up the east coast. The British and the Americans diverted 12 British anti-submarine warfare (ASW) trawlers from the Western Approaches and 18 from US waters, along with six more destroyers and four corvettes from the Eastern Fleet. Four Catalina flying boats of 209 Squadron were transferred to Cape Town and Durban. The transfers took time and the trawlers from US waters did not arrive until December.

== Prelude ==
=== Convoy SL 119 ===
Convoy SL 119 was found by U-214 of gruppe Iltis (ex-gruppe Blücher) and directed the rest of the wolfpack, U-566, U-406 and U-107, along with the gruppe Eisbär boats in the vicinity, diverted by Dönitz (BdU) from the voyage to the South African coast, comprising the Type IXC U-boats U-68, U-156, U-172 and U-504. U-566 sank two ships with a total of 14,085 GRT on 28 August before being damaged by depth charges; U-107 was forced to retire and on 29 August the other boats were also ended their attacks. U-156 sank Clan Macwhirter (5,941 GRT) on 27 August and on 12 September sank Laconia causing the Laconia incident.

=== Raeder and SKL ===
Dönitz was overruled by Generaladmiral Erich Raeder, the Oberbefehlshaber Der Kriegsmarine and SKL. Gruppe Eisbär was redirected southwards to Cape Town, refuelling from the Type XIV tanker U-459 south of Ascension Island. U-68 had sunk the British ship SS Trevilley (5,300 GRT) on 12 September and the Dutch ship SS Breedijk (6,861 GRT) on 14 September; U-159 took over from U-156. A second wave of four long-range Type IXD2 boats, U-177, U-178, U-179, U-181 and an Italian U-cruiser, Ammiraglio Cagni, were close behind. The rest of the boats had not expended any torpedoes, leaving the other Type IXC boats with 22 torpedoes each, the IXD2s with 24 each and Cagni with 42).

== Operations ==
=== Cape Town ===
Map of South Africa and coastal ports

On the night of 6/7 October, U-68 had been in position for five days, photographing the bay. Emmermann in U-172 had a Metox radar detector and moved towards Table Bay on the surface, placing most of the crew on the deck, wearing life jackets, in case a mine was set off. Emmermann kept the boat on the surface for several hours so that the crew could take turns on deck to watch the peaceful scene as the other boats lay in wait outside the bay. The bay was seen to be empty and covered by searchlights and radar, precluding the likelihood of the attack achieving surprise. Emmermann submerged U-172 before dawn and watched through the periscope in brilliant sunshine.

Outside the bay, U-159 sank the British SS Boringia. The captains of U-68 and U-172 contacted BdU to request that the plan be abandoned but Dönitz wanted them to continue. At midnight on 8 October when the attack was due to begin, Cape Town had not been blacked out and the authorities were ignorant of the attack on Boringia. Having received a garbled reply, Emmermann 'assumed that BdU had agreed to the cancellation and that he had freedom of action' from 4:00 a.m. on 7 October.

U-172 sank the US ship Chickasaw City and then the Panamanian Firethorn. U-172 sank Pantelis with a torpedo and U-68 used seven torpedoes to sink the Greek freighter Koumoundouros and the Dutch Gaasterkirk, both of which managed to transmit distress signals. At dawn the destroyers HMS Active, Arrow and Foxhound and HMAS Nizam, with the corvette HMS Rockrose sailed and spent much of the day rescuing survivors. Every aircraft that was airworthy went aloft to reconnoitre. The next morning, when Clan Mactavish tried to rescue the 28 survivors of Boringia, she was torpedoed, and another seven members of the crew of Boringia were killed along with 53 from Clan Mactavish. Aircraft on anti-submarine patrol guided Matheran to the area to rescue survivors who were landed at Cape Town.

=== Other attacks ===
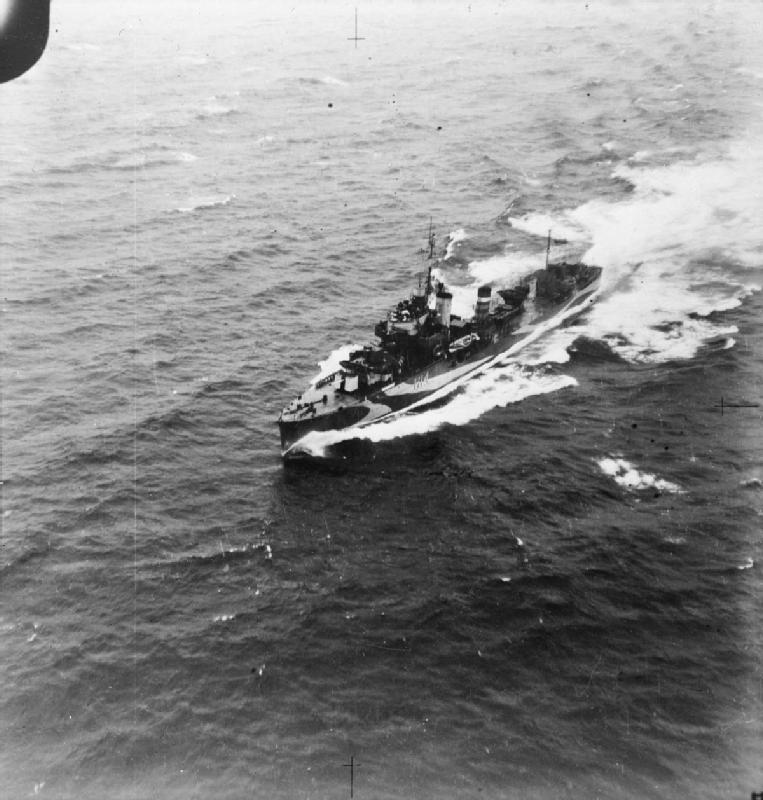
HMS Active photographed under way in 1944

U-159 had gone into action off Cape Town on and sank the US ship Coloradan on 9 October then survived a depth-charge attack by a South African aircraft. U-159 moved to the south-east and sank Empire Nomad, Ross and Laplace, all British, by the end of the month. On 7 November, the US ship, La Salle, 350 nmi (650 km; 400 mi) to the south-east of the Cape of Good Hope, was destroyed when its cargo of ammunition exploded, the sound being heard 300 nmi (560 km; 350 mi) away at the Cape Point lighthouse. The next ship sunk was a US schooner, Star of Scotland, by gunfire, the survivors making a 1,040 nmi (1,930 km; 1,200 mi)-voyage to Angola.

By this time, U-159 was on the return leg of its voyage and refuelled from U-461 before sailing for St Paul's Rocks, about 510 nmi (940 km; 590 mi) to the north-east of Brazil, then raiding along the Brazilian coast. U-159 sank the liner City of Bombay, from which 120 of the 130 crew and passengers survived, 12 of whom were rescued by Star of Suez, which U-159 sank on 15 December. East Wales was sunk on 16 December and then U-159 sailed for Lorient in France.

On 8 October, U-172 had sunk the Panamanian MV Firethorn and the Greek Pantelis. Anti-submarine vessels from Cape Town attacked the U-boat, which escaped with minor damage. On 10 October the troopship Orcades, en route from Suez to Britain, was sunk in a storm. BdU sent U-172 to Brazilian coastal waters and in mid-November, it sank Aldington Court and Llandilo in the South Atlantic, then Benlomond off the Brazilian coast then sank the US Alaskan off St Paul's Rocks, before refuelling for the voyage home.

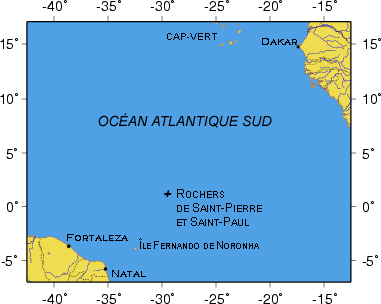
Location map of the Saint Peter and Paul Rocks (00°55′1″N 29°20′45″W)

On 8 October, after U-68 had sunk the Greek Koumoundouros and the Dutch Gaasterkerk, it sank the US tanker Swiftsure and the British liner Sarthe. On 9 October, the US ship Examelia was sunk, followed by the emigré-manned Belgian Fighter. On 29 October, short of fuel, U-68 began the journey home and on 6 November, about 500 nmi (930 km; 580 mi) south of Saint Helena sank City of Cairo with the loss of 104 crew and passengers. The captain, Karl-Friedrich Merten, surfaced and gave the survivors a compass course for Saint Helena.

U-504 commenced operations off Cape Town on 17 October then headed up the east coast of South Africa and sank Empire Chaucer. All but three of the crew of Empire of Chaucer survived, the captain and 11 men being rescued by Empire Squire, after 23 days 15 men were rescued by SS Nebraska and another 14 landed at Bredasdorp in the Western Cape, after a two-week voyage. On 23 October, City of Johannesburg was sunk off East London and on 26 October U-504 sank the US ship Anne Hutchinson, followed on 31 October by the British Empire Guidon east of Durban and Reynolds off Madagascar. U-504 sank the Brazilian SS Porto Alegre east of Port Elizabeth on its return voyage.

=== U-cruiser attacks ===
Southern Africa and the island of Madagascar

On 10 October 1942, U-178 sank the troopship RMS Duchess of Atholl (20,119 GRT) on the voyage to the south, rounded the cape and began operations off Durban. After failing to catch a tanker and using two torpedoes to no effect on a freighter, the U-boat barely escaped an attack from an aircraft. On 1 November an attack on what was thought to be Laurentic (18,700 GRT) but was the British Mendoza (8,200 GRT) succeeded, in which 150 of the 400 people on board were killed. Ibbeken circumnavigated Madagascar, sinking the Norwegian Hai Hing (2,600 GRT) and the 5,200 GRT British ship Trekieve but engine trouble led to less success than anticipated. Off Durban, the British Louise Moller (3,800 GRT) was sunk but the British 6,300 GRT Adviser was damaged and later towed into Durban. ASW aircraft made two attacks on U-178, after which the captain sailed far offshore to repair its engines, then began the return journey to France. As U-178 rounded the Cape an attack sank the US ship Jeremiah Wadsworth (7,200 GRT), returning on 9 January 1943 with six recognised sinkings of 47,000 GRT.

U-177 and U-181 reached Cape Town at about the same time and on 2 November, U-177 attacked the Greek Aegeus (4,500 GRT) with four torpedoes, missing with two but the two that hit set off the cargo of ammunition and the ship exploded, showering the submarine with débris, injuring a lookout. For the next ten days the submarines searched off Cape Town. U-177 attacked the 2,600 GRT US freighter Cerion during a five-hour chase and missed with five torpedoes. U-177 surfaced and engaged the ship with its deck gun but the Americans fired back and escaped. From 19 November U-177 patrolled off Lourenço Marques and over 26 days sank six ships and a tanker, a total of 44,800 GRT. A troopship, RMS Nova Scotia (6,796 GRT) carrying 899 passengers, made up of 765 interned Italian civilians and 134 South African troops, was torpedoed on 18 November. When Gysae realised he signalled Dönitz who forbade rescue attempts. Two passengers were taken prisoner and about 400 survivors were in boats and on rafts. Dönitz notified the Portuguese who sent NRP Afonso de Albuquerque from Mozambique, that rescued 192 people, 43 of them South African troops. About 750 people were killed; 120 bodies were washed ashore at Durban and many of the 630 missing died in shark attacks. U-177 returned to France on 22 January after 128 days, with eight ships confirmed sunk of 49,371 GRT.

On 3 November, U-181 sank the US motor ship East Indian with two of four torpedoes, killing 34 of the crew of 50. U-181 sank the Panamanian Plaudit (5,060 GRT) with three crew killed and 46 rescued on 8 November, sank the Norwegian vessel K.G. Meldahl (3,799 GRT) on 10 November and the US Excello (4,969 GRT) on 13 November. Two days later the destroyer HMS Inconstant forced U-181 to dive to 573 ft (175 m), b dropping 30 depth charges over a nine-hour attack. The corvettes HMS Jasmine and Nigella arrived and continued the hunt, Jasmine dropping five depth charges, before U-181 escaped in the noise of the depth charge explosions and the dark, later to make repairs. After repairing the damage U-181 moved about 250 nmi (460 km; 290 mi) to Lourenço Marques and from 19 November to 2 December sank eight ships of 23,800 GRT, using all 355 rounds of deck gun ammunition, that caused many casualties and risked U-181 being caught on the surface. Lüth kept back two torpedoes and reached France on 18 January after a voyage of 129 days, 21,369 nmi (39,575 km; 24,591 mi) having sunk 12 ships of 58,381 GRT.

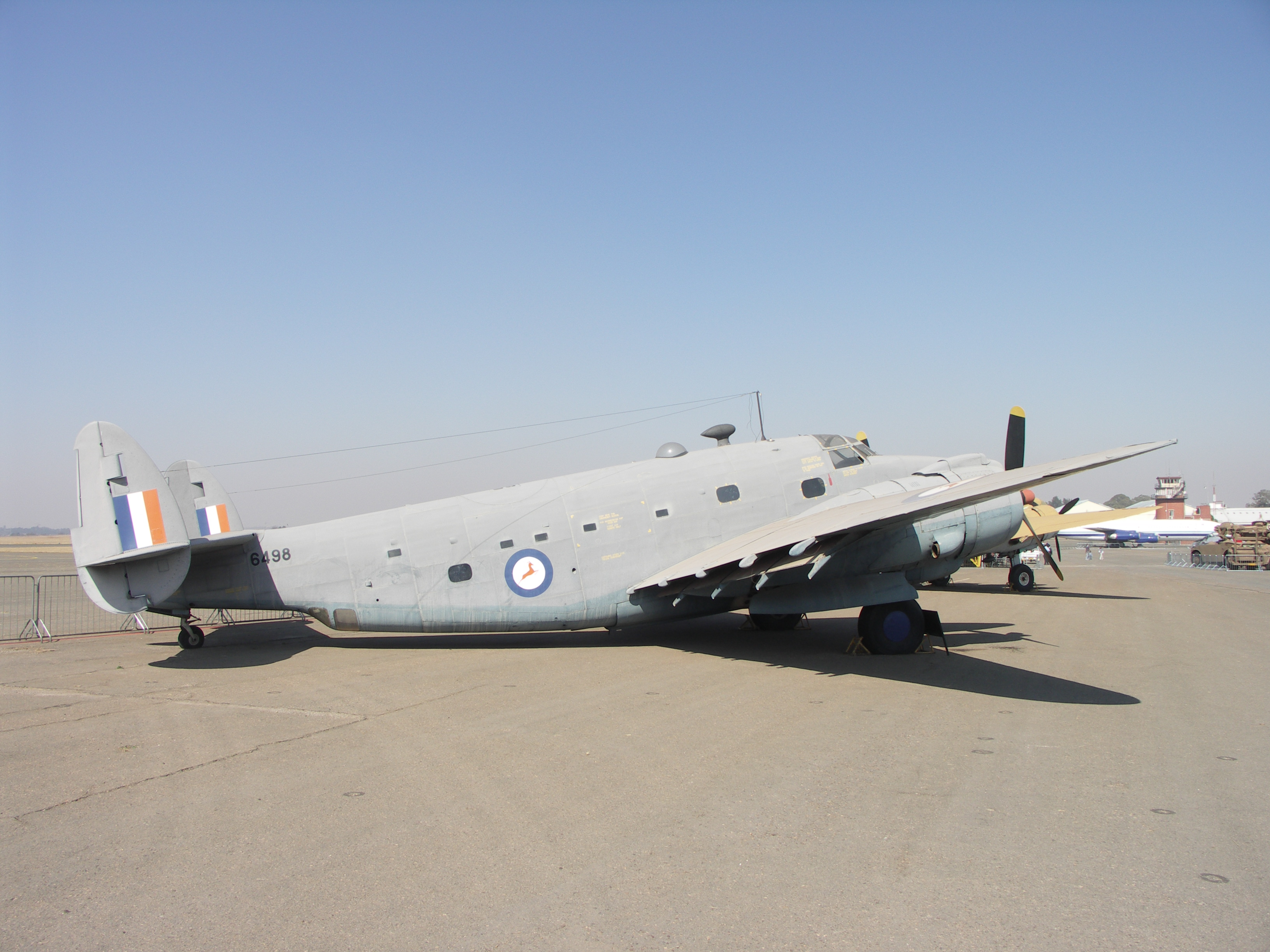
SAAF Lockheed PV1 Ventura

U-179 had not been diverted to Convoy SL 119 and on the afternoon of 8 October, while 60 nmi (110 km; 69 mi) south of Cape Town, dived to avoid a Ventura maritime reconnaissance bomber of the South African Air Force (SAAF). Before night fell City of Athens was torpedoed then U-179 dived to 80 m (260 ft) after seeing another aircraft. The crew of the freighter managed to launch all six lifeboats that were spotted by another Ventura. Many other ships were under attack and sending distress calls but HMS Activewas diverted to rescue the survivors and took on board the crew, less one man, by 11:30 a.m. The destroyer got a radar contact 2,500 yd (2,300 m) to the south-east, followed by an Asdic contact then a sighting. Active accelerated to 25 kn (46 km/h; 29 mph), opened fire and then dropped depth-charges that brought the U-boat to the surface, after which it sank out of view. No wreckage was found but a large oil slick formed.

Ammiraglio Cagni sank the Greek merchant ship Argo (2,000 GRT) on 29 November but a greater ASW effort being made off the Cape of Good Hope led the commander, Carlo Liannazza, to sail for home, refuelling near the equator from U-459 and returning to BETASOM at Bordeaux.

== Aftermath ==
=== Analysis ===
In 2000, Clay Blair called the gruppe Eisbär operation one of the most successful U-boat efforts of the war. Four Type IX boats sank 23 ships (155,335 GRT) off Cape Town and Durban along with eleven ships (60,829 GRT) in transit to and from the cape for a total of 34 ships (216,164 GRT), an average of 8.5 ships (54,041 GRT) per boat, a greater monthly success than the best month of attacks off the US coast. The U-cruisers that operated off Cape Town and Durban sank 27 ships of 161,407 GRT, an average of 6.75 ships per U-boat (40,350 GRT). The ship sunk by Ammiraglio Cagni raised the total to 28 ships and 163,400 GRT.

In the latter half of 1942, about 50 U-boats operated around the Azores, Canary Islands, Freetown Sierra Leone, further south and around Cape Town and Durban. The U-boats sank about 150 ships of around 900,000 GRT for the loss of three U-boats and their crews, 50 ships for each U-boat, that was called an "extraordinary achievement" by Blair and an embarrassing failure for the British anti-submarine effort in southern waters. Since the positions of ship losses were not disclosed by the Allies, the impression that north Atlantic convoys were being massacred was increased.

In 2000, Werner Rahn, a German military historian and one of the authors of "Germany and the Second World War" (1979 to 2008) wrote that though the British had discovered the southward movement of the U-boats and had taken such defensive measures as they could by rerouting ships, the U-boats sank 15 ships (108,070 GRT) in five days from 7 October. By November, 156,235 GRT had been sunk, 28 per cent of all U-boat sinkings in October. The U-boats began their return journeys from the South Atlantic in early November. Gruppe Eisbär was followed by a second wave of Type IXD2 U-cruisers, with a range of 31,000 nmi (57,000 km; 36,000 mi) at 10 kn (19 km/h; 12 mph) obviating the need to refuel and take on supplies.

The U-cruisers sailed along the African coast into the Indian Ocean as far north as Lourenço Marques (now Maputo) and by mid-December 1942, had sunk 25 ships (134,780 GRT). BdU tried to keep a standing patrol in the area for the next few months but the British introduction of convoy made it impossible to maintain the rate of sinking. Rahn wrote that strategically, Gruppe Eisbär and the U-cruisers were at least six months too late. The sinkings off Cape Town and in the Indian Ocean did little to obstruct the reinforcement of the British in Egypt and the offensive that followed the defence of El Alamein, because the bulk of it has already arrived.

In 2005, Richard Woodman wrote that for the loss of U-179 the German long-range submarines exposed the vulnerability of British shipping, that was necessarily dispersed all over the globe. Woodman speculated about what might have happened if Dönitz had had the bigger, long-range U-boats at the start of the war. The sinking of U-179 from gruppe Eisbär was the only result of the anti-submarine effort made in the region, because the U-boats did not follow Rudeltaktik (wolfpack tactics) but operated individually in an orgy of destruction.

== German order of battle ==
=== Group Polar Bear (Eisbär) ===
Gruppe Eisbär
Boat	Captain	Flag	Type	Notes
U-68	Karl-Friedrich Merten	Kriegsmarine	Type IXC submarine	
U-156	Werner Hartenstein	Kriegsmarine	Type IXC submarine	Replaced by U-159 after the Laconia incident
U-159	Helmut Witte	Kriegsmarine	Type IXC submarine	Replaced U-156 after the Laconia incident
U-172	Carl Emmermann	Kriegsmarine	Type IXC submarine	
U-459	Wilamowitz-Moellendorff	Kriegsmarine	Type XIV submarine	Tanker and supply boat
U-504	Fritz Poske	Kriegsmarine	Type IXC submarine	

== Ships attacked ==
=== gruppe Eisbär ===
Date order list of merchant ships attacked by gruppe Eisbär
Ship	Year	Flag	GRT	Notes
Trevilley	1940	Merchant Navy	5,296	Sunk U-68, 12 September, 04°30′S, 07°50′W, 2†, 49 resc.
Breedijk	1922	Netherlands	6,861	Sunk U-68, 15 September, 5°05′S, 8°54′W, 2† 50 resc.
Koumoundouros	1925	Greece	3,598	Sunk, U-68, 8 October, 34°10′S, 17°07′E, 5† 26 resc.
Gaasterkerk	1922	Netherlands	8,679	Sunk, U-68, 8 October, 34°20′S, 18°10′E, all 64 resc.
Swiftsure	1921	United States	8,207	Sunk, U-68, 8 October, 34°40′S, 18°25′E, all 33 resc.
Sarthe	1920	Merchant Navy	5,271	Sunk, U-68, 8 October, 34°50′S, 18°40′E, all 57 resc.
Examelia	1920	United States	4,981	Sunk, U-68, 9 October, 34°52′S, 18°30′E, 11† 40 resc.
Belgian Fighter	1921	Belgium	5,403	Sunk, U-68, 9 October, 35°00′S, 18°30′E, 5† 49 resc.
City of Cairo	1915	Merchant Navy	8,034	Sunk, U-68, 6 November, 23°30′S, 05°30′W, 104† 192 resc.
Clan Macwhirter	1918	Merchant Navy	5,941	Sunk U-156, 26 August, 35°45′N, 18°45′W, 11†, 77 resc.
RMS Laconia	1922	Merchant Navy	19,695	Sunk U-156, 12 September, 5°05′S, 11°38′W, 1,658† 1,083 resc.
Quebec City	1927	Merchant Navy	4,745	Sunk U-156, 19 September, 2°12′S, 17°36′W, 1† 41 resc.
Boringia	1930	Denmark	5,821	Sunk U-159, 7 October, 35°09′S, 16°32′E, 32† 33 resc.
Clan Mactavish	1921	Merchant Navy	7,631	Sunk U-159, 8 October, 34°53′S, 16°45′E, 61† 75 resc.
Coloradan	1920	United States	6,557	Sunk U-159, 9 October, 35°47′S, 14°34′E, 6† 48 resc.
Empire Nomad	1942	Merchant Navy	7,167	Sunk U-159, 37°50′S, 18°16′E 7† 46 resc.
Ross	1936	Merchant Navy	4,978	Sunk U-159, 29 October, 38°51′S, 21°40′E, 1† 39 resc.
Laplace	1919	Merchant Navy	7,327	Sunk U-159, 29 October, 40°33′S, 21°35′E, all 63 resc.
La Salle	1920	United States	5,462	Sunk U-159, 7 November, 40°00′S, 21°30′E, all 60†
Star of Scotland	1887	United States	2,290	Sunk U-159, 13 November, 26°30′S, 00°20′W, 1† 16 resc.
City of Bombay	1937	Merchant Navy	7,410	Sunk U-159, 13 December, 02°43′S, 29°06′W, 20† 130 resc.
Star of Suez	1926	Egypt	4,999	Sunk U-159, 15 December, 00°42′S, 29°34′W, 2† 40 resc.
East Wales	1925	Merchant Navy	4,358	Convoy Trin-27, sunk U-159, 16 Dec, 00°24′N, 31°27′W, 17† 28 resc.
Chickasaw City	1920	United States	6,296	Sunk, U-172, 7 October, 34°05′S, 17°16′E, 7† 43 resc.
Firethorn	1937	Panama	4,700	Sunk U-172, 7 October, 34°13′S, 17°21′E, 12† 49 resc.
Pantelis	1911	Greece	3,845	Sunk U-172, 8 October, 34°20′S, 17°50′E, 28† 5 resc.
Orcades	1927	Merchant Navy	23,456	Sunk U-172, 10 October, 35°51′S, 14°40′E, 48† 1,016 resc.
Aldington Court	1929	Merchant Navy	4,982	Sunk U-172, 31 October, 30°20′S, 02°10′W, 34† 10 resc.
Llandilo	1928	Merchant Navy	4,966	Sunk U-172, 2 November, 27°03′S, 02°59′W, 24† 20 resc.
Benlomond	1922	Merchant Navy	6,630	Sunk U-172, 23 November, 0°30′N, 38°45′W, 55† 1 resc.
Alaskan	1918	United States	5,364	Sunk U-172, 28 November, 03°58′N, 26°19′W, 7† 39 resc.
Empire Chaucer	1942	Merchant Navy	5,970	Sunk U-504, 17 October, 38° 12'S, 20° 04'E, 3† 47 resc.
City of Johannesburg	1920	Merchant Navy	5,669	Sunk U-504, 23 October, 33°20′S, 29°30′E, 2† 87 resc.
Anne Hutchinson	1942	United States	7,176	Sunk U-504, 26 October, 33°10′S, 28°30′E, 3† 54 resc.
Empire Guidon	1942	Merchant Navy	7,041	Sunk U-504, 31 October, 30° 48'S, 34° 11'E, 2† 52 resc.
Reynolds	1927	Merchant Navy	5,024	Sunk U-504, 31 October, 30°02′S, 35°02′E, all 47†
Porto Alegre	1921	Brazil	5,187	Sunk U-504, 3 November, 35°27′S, 28°02′E, 1†, 57 resc.

=== U-cruisers ===
U-cruiser force
Boat	Name	Flag	Type	Notes
U-177	Robert Gysae	Kriegsmarine	Type IXD2 submarine	17 September 1942 to 22 January 1943
U-178	Hans Ibbeken	Kriegsmarine	Type IXD2 submarine	8 September 1942 to 9 January 1943
U-179	Ernst Sobe	Kriegsmarine	Type IXD2 submarine	15. 8. 1942, sunk, 8. 10. 42, 33°28′S, 17°05′E, 67†
U-181	Wolfgang Lüth	Kriegsmarine	Type IXD2 submarine	12 September 1942 to 18 January 1943
Ammiraglio Cagni	Carlo Liannazza	Kingdom of Italy	Cagni-class submarine	

=== U-cruiser attacks ===
Merchant ships attacked (in date order)
Ship	Year	Flag	GRT	Notes
Aegeus	1920	Greece	4,538	Sunk U-177, 2 November, 32°30′S, 16°00′E, all 29†
Cerion	1938	Merchant Navy	2,558	Damaged U-177, 9 November, 35°58′S, 26°37′E, 2† 44 resc.
Scottish Chief	1928	Merchant Navy	7,006	Sunk U-177, 19 November, 30°39'S, 34°41'E, 36† 12 resc.
Pierce Butler	1942	United States	7,191	Sunk U-177, 20 November, 29°40′S, 36°35′E, all 62 resc.
RMS Nova Scotia	1926	Merchant Navy	6,796	Sunk U-177, 28°30′S, 33°00′E, 858† 194 resc.
Llandaff Castle	1926	Merchant Navy	10,799	Sunk U-177, 30 November, 27°20′S, 33°40′E, 3† 310 resc.
Saronikos	1912	Greece	3,548	Sunk U-177, 7 December, 24°46′S, 35°30′E, 31† 2 resc.
Empire Gull	1919	Merchant Navy	6,408	Sunk U-177, 12 December, 26°15′S, 34°40′E, 2† 44 resc.
Sawahloento	1921	Netherlands	3,085	Sunk U-177, 14 December, 31°02′S, 34°00′E, 53† 19 resc.
RMS Duchess of Atholl	1928	Merchant Navy	20,119	Sunk U-178, 10 October, 07°03′S, 11°12′W, 4† 821 resc.
Mendoza	1919	Merchant Navy	8,233	Sunk U-178, 1 November, 29°20′S, 32°13′E, 26† 380 resc.
Hai Hing	1929	Norway	2,561	Sunk U-178, 4 November, 25°55′S, 33°10′E 25† 42 resc.
Trekieve	1919	Merchant Navy	5,244	Sunk U-178, 4 November, 25°46′S, 33°48′E, 3† 47 resc.
Louise Moller	1907	Merchant Navy	3,764	Sunk U-178, 13 November, 30°50′S, 35°54′E. 11† 52 resc.
Adviser	1939	Merchant Navy	6,348	Damaged U-178, 15 November, 32°03′S, 33°52′E, all 66 resc.
Jeremiah Wadsworth	1942	United States	7,176	Sunk U-178, 27 November, 39°25′S, 22°23′E, all 57 resc.
City of Athens	1923	Merchant Navy	6,558	Sunk U-179, 8 October, 33°40′S, 17°03′E, 1† 90 resc.
East Indian	1918	United States	8,159	Sunk U-181, 3 November, 37°23′S, 13°34′E, 58† 16 resc.
Plaudit	1913	Panama	5,060	Sunk U-181, 8 November, 36°00′S, 26°32′E, 3† 46 resc.
K.G. Meldahl	1938	Norway	3,799	Sunk U-181, 10 November, 34°59′S, 29°45′E, 2† 31 resc.
Excello	1919	United States	4,969	Sunk U-181, 13 November, 32°23′S, 30°07′E, 2† 49 resc.
Gunda	1919	Norway	2,241	Sunk U-181, 19 November, 25°48′S, 33°15′E, 38† 8 resc.
Corinthiakos	1910	Greece	3,562	Sunk U-181, 20 November, 25°42′S, 33°27′E, 11† 21 resc.
Alcoa Pathfinder	1941	United States	6,797	Sunk U-181, 22 November, 26°45′S, 33°10′E, 6† 55 resc.
Mount Helmos	1923	Greece	6,481	Sunk U-181, 24 November, 26°38′S, 34°59′E, 1† 34 resc.
Dorington Court	1939	Merchant Navy	5,281	Sunk U-181, 24 November, 27 00′S, 34°45′E, 4† 39 resc.
Evanthia	1915	Greece	3,551	Sunk U-181, 28 November, 25°13′S, 34°00′E, all 32 resc.
Cleanthis	1911	Greece	4,153	Sunk U-181, 30 November, 24°29′S, 35°44′E, 12† 22 resc.
Amarylis	1918	Panama	4,328	Sunk U-181, 2 December, 28°14′S, 33°24′E, 29† 8 resc.
Dagomba	1928	Merchant Navy	3,845	Sunk Ammiraglio Cagni, 3 November, 02°35′S, 18°31′W, 10† 44 resc. (Note: The ship was sunk in the Gulf of Guinea en route to South Africa.)
Argo	1920	Greece	1,995	Sunk Ammiraglio Cagni, 29 November, 34°45′S, 17°42′E, 18† 18 resc.

== Bibliography ==
- Beesly, Patrick (2015) [1977]. Very Special Intelligence: The Story of the Admiralty's Operational Intelligence Centre 1939–1945 (ePUB, Frontline Books (Pen & Sword) Barnsley ed.). London: Hamish Hamilton. ISBN 978-1-78-438156-1.
- Behrens, C. B. A. (1955). Hancock, K. (ed.). Merchant Shipping and the Demands of War. History of the Second World War United Kingdom Civil Series. London: HMSO. OCLC 498039 – via Archive Foundation.
- Blair, Clay (2000) [1999]. Hitler's U-Boat War: The Hunted 1942–1945. London: Cassell. ISBN 0-304-35261-6.
- Boog, H.; Rahn, W.; Stumpf, R.; Wegner, B. (2001) [1990]. Der globale Krieg: Die Ausweitung zum Weltkrieg und der Wechsel zur Initiative 1941 bis 1943 [Widening of the Conflict into a World War and the Shift of the Initiative 1941–1943]. Das Deutsche Reich und der Zweite Weltkrieg (Germany and the Second World War). Vol. VI. Translated by Osers, Ewald; Brownjohn, John; Crampton, Patricia; Willmot, Louise (eng. trans. Cambridge University Press, London ed.). Stuttgart: Deutsche Verlags-Anstalt for the Militärgeschichtlichen Forschungsamt. ISBN 0-19-822888-0.
  - Rahn, W. "The War at Sea in the Atlantic and in the Arctic Ocean Part III The Conduct of the War in the Atlantic and the Coastal Area 1. The U-boat War (d) The Fifth Phase, August 1942 – May 1943: Climax and Collapse of the U-boat War". In Boog et al. (2001), pp. 379–388.
- Helgason, Guðmundur (2025). "WWII U-boat Successes: Ships hit by U-181". U-boat.net.
- Jordan, Roger W. (2006) [1999]. The World's Merchant Fleets 1939: The Particulars and Wartime Fates of 6,000 Ships (2nd ed.). London: Chatham/Lionel Leventhal. ISBN 978-1-86176-293-1.
- Niestlé, Axel (2014). German U-Boat Losses during World War II: Details of Destruction. Barnsley: Frontline Books. ISBN 978-1-84832-210-3.
- Roskill, S. W. (1956). The Period of Balance. History of the Second World War: The War at Sea 1939–1945. Vol. II (3rd impr. ed.). London: HMSO. OCLC 174453986.
- Rohwer, Jürgen; Hümmelchen, Gerhard (2005) [1972]. Chronology of the War at Sea, 1939–1945: The Naval History of World War Two (3rd rev. ed.). London: Chatham. ISBN 978-1-86176-257-3.
- Woodman, Richard (2005) [2004]. The Real Cruel Sea: The Merchant Navy in the Battle of the Atlantic 1939–1943. London: John Murray. ISBN 0-7195-6599-5.
