= U68 =

U68 may refer to:

- German submarine U-68, various vessels
- Great truncated icosidodecahedron
- Small nucleolar RNA SNORA68
- WFUT-DT, a television station licensed to Newark, New Jersey
