= Ben Lomond (disambiguation) =

Ben Lomond is a mountain in Scotland, east of Loch Lomond.

Ben Lomond may also refer to:

== Places ==
=== Australia ===
- Ben Lomond bioregion, a biogeographic region in Tasmania
  - Ben Lomond (Tasmania), a mountain located in the biogeographic region
- Ben Lomond, New South Wales, a town in Australia's New England region
- Ben Lomond, Tasmania, a locality

=== Canada ===
- Ben Lomond (North Shore Mountains), a mountain in British Columbia, Canada

=== New Zealand ===
- Ben Lomond (Waikato), a lava dome in Waikato in the North Island of New Zealand
- Ben Lomond (Otago), a mountain in the South Island of New Zealand

=== United States ===
- Ben Lomond, Arkansas, a town in Sevier County, Arkansas
- Ben Lomond, California, a census-designated place (CDP) in Santa Cruz County, California
- Ben Lomond Mountain AVA, a wine region in Santa Cruz County, California
- Ben Lomond High School, a secondary school in Ogden, Utah
- Ben Lomond Mountain (Utah), a mountain peak in the Wasatch Range of northern Utah
- Ben Lomand, a small mountain in the vicinity of Palmer Lake, Colorado
- Ben Lomond, West Virginia, an unincorporated community in Mason County, West Virginia
- Ben Lomond Plantation, an 1832 plantation near Manassas, Virginia, used as a hospital during the American Civil War

== Other uses ==
- SS Ben Lomond (1872) a vessel which operated on Lake Wakatipu in New Zealand
- SS Benlomond, one of a number of merchant vessels including
  - SS Benlomond (1922), a merchant vessel sunk in World War II
- Ben Lomond, a village in Aberdeen District, Saint Elizabeth Parish, Jamaica
- Ben Lomond Village, a hamlet located in the metropolitan area of San Fernando, Trinidad and Tobago
