= Ben Lomond Mountain =

Ben Lomond Mountain may refer to:

- Ben Lomond Mountain AVA, California wine region in Santa Cruz County
- Ben Lomond Mountain (California), a mountain in the Santa Cruz Mountains in Santa Cruz County, California
- Ben Lomond Mountain (Utah), Ogden, Utah
- Ben Lomond (North Shore Mountains), formerly Ben Lomond Mountain, a mountain in British Columbia, Canada
