= German submarine U-156 =

U-156 may refer to one of the following German submarines:

- SM U-156, a Type U 151 submarine launched in 1917; served in World War I until sunk on 25 September 1918
- German submarine U-156 (1941), a Type IXC submarine that served in World War II until sunk on 8 March 1943
