= VP-AM-1 =

Amphibian Patrol Squadron 1
- Active: 1 May 1942 – 5 May 1948
- Country: United States of America
- Branch: United States Navy
- Type: squadron
- Role: Maritime patrol
- Engagements: World War II

Aircraft flown
- Patrol: PBY-5/5A/6A

VP-AM-1 was an Amphibian Patrol Squadron of the U.S. Navy. The squadron was established as Patrol Squadron 53 (VP-53) on 1 May 1942, redesignated Patrol Bombing Squadron 53 (VPB-53) on 1 October 1944, redesignated Patrol Squadron 53 (VP-53) on 15 May 1946, redesignated Amphibious Patrol Squadron 1 (VP-AM-1) on 15 November 1946 and disestablished on 5 May 1948.

== Operational history ==
- 1 May 1942: VP-53 was established at NAS Norfolk, Virginia, under the operational control of PatWing-5 and assigned a complement of 12 PBY-5 Catalinas. The squadron commenced training and equipping over the next two months, operating from a field at NAF Breezy Point, near NAS Norfolk.
- 1–24 July 1942: VP-53 flew to NAS Banana River, Florida, to conduct night flight training and then to NAS Quonset Point, Rhode Island, for torpedo training.
- 25 July 1942: VP-53 returned to NAS Norfolk, departing for NAS Key West, Florida the next day. The squadron conducted operational combat patrols from this site off the coast of Florida, providing coverage for convoy routes.
- 24 September 1942: VP-53 departed NAS Key West for its new base of operations via NAS Guantanamo Bay, Cuba, and NAS San Juan, Puerto Rico. Upon arrival in Cuba the squadron came under the operational control of PatWing-11. The squadron left Guantanamo Bay the next day for NAS San Juan, P.R., then on to NAS Trinidad, British West Indies, arriving on 1 October 1942.
- 1 October 1942: NAS Trinidad was the base of operations for the squadron over the next seven months. During this time VP-53 conducted routine Anti-submarine warfare (ASW) searches and convoy protection patrols.
- 8 March 1943: Lieutenant J. E. Dryden attacked and sank U-156 east of Barbados with the loss of the entire crew of 52 officers and enlisted ratings aboard. The submarine had been responsible for the sinking of the Allied liner RMS Laconia west of Africa on 12 September 1942, in what became known as the Laconia incident.
- 13 July 1943: VP-53 was relieved from duty in the Caribbean. Immediately after returning to NAS Norfolk, the squadron was given a brief period of leave, then transferred to NAS San Diego, California, under the operational control of FAW-14.
- 30 September – December 1943: VP-53 began the trans-Pacific flight to NAS Kaneohe Bay, Hawaii. The last aircraft arrived on 5 October and the squadron was under the operational control of FAW-2. A six-week period of training followed, including operational patrols off the coasts of the islands. By 1 December VP-53 was en route to Funafuti.
- January – May 1944: During the squadron’s deployment to Funafuti, Gilbert Islands and Marshall Islands it conducted a minimum of two patrols a day. Although these search patrols produced negative results they provided the fleet with the knowledge that its flank and rear sections were free of enemy forces. Besides the routine patrols the squadron also flew Dumbo (air-sea rescue) missions. While deployed the squadron maintained detachments in Nouméa, Apanama, Tarawa, Majuro and Makin.
- May – June 1944: The squadron operated a six-plane detachment from Kwajalein and engaged in night harassment bombing of Wotje, Mille, Maloelap and Jaluit. The bombing was designed to annoy the Japanese garrisons and keep them from repairing the airstrips.
- June – July 1944: VP-53 was relieved and returned to NAS Kaneohe Bay, for a short rest period prior to embarking aboard USS Barnes on 2 July for the trip back to the U.S. and a period of home leave.
- 15 August 1944: VP-53 was reformed at NAS Whidbey Island, Washington, under the operational control of FAW-6. Training of new personnel and refitting with new equipment and aircraft continued through the end of the year.
- 27 January 1945: VPB-53 began preparations for the trans-Pacific flight to NAS Kaneohe Bay, arriving there and reporting to FAW-2 in early February. The squadron was given the customary period of combat training through the end of March.
- 31 March 1945: VPB-53 deployed in three-aircraft elements to Palmyra Island for duty with the 7th Fleet at Manus Island. The last element arrived on 14 April and the squadron was given orders to proceed to Green Island.
- April – June 1945: VPB-53 arrived at Green Island, coming under the operational control of FAW-10. Squadron operations were primarily air-sea rescue missions in connection with the daily strikes on Bougainville Island and Rabaul, New Britain. The squadron also conducted some night harassment attacks on Rabaul, Buka and Bougainville.
- 15 June – September 1945: VPB-53 maintained a six-plane detachment at Samar for Dumbo missions and routine patrols. On 22 June the rest of the squadron joined the detachment at Samar, which operated there through September 1945. On 1 August the squadron’s primary mission became ASW patrols both day and night.
- October 1945: VPB-53 was relocated to Tinian under the operational control of FAW-18 and received new PBY-6A Catalinas.
- February 1946: VPB-53 maintained detachments at: Guam, Marcus, Iwo Jima, Peleliu (one plane each); Yokosuka, Japan (four planes) and Saipan (two planes). The squadron still operated under the control of FAW-18.
- 15 May 1946: VPB-53 was redesignated VP-53, and remained under the operational control of FAW-18. At this time the squadron was maintaining detachments at: Shanghai, Truk, Iwo Jima, Majuro (one aircraft each); Yokosuka, Japan (three aircraft); and Saipan (two aircraft).
- 6 September 1946: VP-53 was relieved of its duties in the Pacific and ordered to report to NAS Whidbey Island. Upon arrival it came under the operational control of FAW-4 with an aircraft allowance of 9 PBY-6A aircraft.
- 15 November 1946: VP-53 was redesignated VP-AM-1. The squadron’s aircraft allowance was reduced to 7 PBY-6A aircraft. The complement continued to be reduced and by June 1947 there were only two PBY-5As on hand.
- November 1947 – Apr 1948: VP-AM-1 relieved VP-AM-2 at NAS Adak, Alaska. The squadron conducted operations with only three aircraft on hand. VP-AM-1 returned to NAS Whidbey Island by 22 April 1948.
- 5 May 1948: VP-AM-1 was disestablished.

== Aircraft assignments ==
The squadron was assigned the following aircraft, effective on the dates shown:

- PBY-5 - May 1942
- PBY-6A - October 1945
- PBY-5A - June 1947

== Home port assignments ==
The squadron was assigned to these home ports, effective on the dates shown:

- NAS Norfolk, Virginia - 1 May 1942
- NAS Key West, Florida - 26 July 1942
- NAS Trinidad, British West Indies - 1 October 1942
- NAS San Diego, California - July 1943
- NAS Kaneohe Bay, Hawaii - October 1943
- NAS Whidbey Island, Washington - August 1944
- NAS Kaneohe Bay - February 1945
- NAS Whidbey Island - September 1946

== See also ==
- Maritime patrol aircraft
- List of inactive United States Navy aircraft squadrons
- List of United States Navy aircraft squadrons
- List of squadrons in the Dictionary of American Naval Aviation Squadrons
- History of the United States Navy
