= SS Anne Hutchinson =

World War II Liberty ship of the United States

- A Liberty ship at sea

History

United States
- Name: Anne Hutchinson
- Namesake: Anne Hutchinson
- Operator: Sudden and Christenson Steamship Company
- Builder: Oregon Shipbuilding Company, Portland, Oregon
- Laid down: 23 April 1942
- Launched: 31 May 1942
- Identification: 241814* Call sign: KEVQ
- Fate: Torpedoed off South Africa 1942. Stern section sunk, bow section scrapped.

General characteristics
- Class & type: Type EC2-S-C1 Liberty ship
- Displacement: 14,245 long tons (14,474 t)
- Length: 441 ft 6 in (134.57 m) o/a; 417 ft 9 in (127.33 m) p/p; 427 ft (130 m) w/l
- Beam: 57 ft (17 m)
- Draft: 27 ft 9 in (8.46 m)
- Propulsion: Two oil-fired boilers; Triple-expansion steam engine; 2,500 hp (1,900 kW); Single screw
- Speed: 11 knots (20 km/h; 13 mph)
- Range: 20,000 nmi (37,000 km; 23,000 mi)
- Capacity: 10,856 t (10,685 long tons) deadweight (DWT)
- Crew: 81
- Armament: Stern-mounted 4 in (100 mm) deck gun; Variety of anti-aircraft guns

SS Anne Hutchinson (MC hull number 238) was a Liberty ship built by the Oregon Shipbuilding Company of Portland, Oregon, and launched on 31 May 1942 The ship was named after the Anne Hutchinson, a 1600 Massachusetts Bay Colony Puritan.

The ship was operated by the Sudden and Christenson Steamship Company of San Francisco, under contract from the War Shipping Administration (WSA) during World War II. On 26 October 1942, she was torpedoed and sunk by the German submarine U-504 off South Africa, in the Indian Ocean at position 33.12°S 28.03°E.

== Sinking ==
Anne Hutchinson was traveling unescorted from Aden, Yemen, to Cape Town, South Africa. She had passed through the Suez Channel and was 59 miles (95 km) off East London Harbour on 26 October 1942 when the German submarine U-504 torpedoed her at about 7:00pm. U-504 fired a group of torpedoes. Anne Hutchinson lookouts saw one torpedo and it passed ahead of the ship. There was no time to avoid the other torpedoes. Two torpedoes hit near the engine room and the cargo hold number 4. The explosion blew the cargo hold number 4 hatch covers off and killed three men sitting on it. The explosion created a 16-foot (4.9 m) hole in the side of the ship, that broke the propeller shaft and stopped all the ship's power. The bulkheads of cargo hold number 4 stopped the flooding of the ship and she remained afloat. Some of her cargo of 8,000 US gallons (30,000 L; 6,700 imp gal) of oil leaked out. All the crew and United States Navy Armed Guards loaded into four lifeboats. The lifeboats rigged the sails to sail to South Africa. One lifeboat lost the group and was separated, but the crew of ten was rescued by the merchant ship SS Steel Mariner and were taken to Durban, South Africa, arriving on 28 October, having only been in the lifeboat for six hours. The other three lifeboats were spotted by a fishing boat near Port Alfred and rescued on 27 October. After resting at Port Alfred the 44 men traveled to Port Elizabeth.

On 29 October, HMSAS David Haigh, a South African naval armed trawler and a harbour tug tried to tow Anne Hutchinson. Due to her partial flooding, the ships were not able to move her. With no other ships available to help, explosives were set to break Anne Hutchinson in two. The forward section was towed to Algoa Bay, making port on 1 November. The explosives sank the aft section of the ship. The forward section was scrapped as it was a total loss. The crew of David Haigh were able to retrieve confidential papers from Anne Hutchinson that the ship's captain should have removed before abandoning ship.
