= SS Hoihow =

History

United Kingdom
- Name: SS Hoihow
- Owner: China Navigation Company Ltd., London
- Builder: Taikoo Dockyard & Engineering Company of Hong Kong Ltd., Hong Kong
- Completed: 1933
- Fate: Sunk 2 July 1943

General characteristics
- Type: Passenger ship
- Tonnage: 2,798 gross register tons
- Propulsion: Steam engine

SS Hoihow was a British passenger ship built in 1933 in Hong Kong by the Taikoo Dockyard & Engineering Company of Hong Kong Ltd. in 1933 for The China Navigation Company of London to operate on the Indochina trade.

During World War II, Hoihow was used to carry food to the United Kingdom.

At 02:00 on 1 July 1943, the German submarine U-181 sighted three Allied merchant ships – Hoihow, under Master William Mackensie Christie, among them – in port at Port Louis, Mauritius. U-181′s commanding officer, Korvettenkapitän Wolfgang Lüth, decided to loiter offshore and wait for them to leave port. On the morning of 2 July 1943, two of them put to sea, and U-181 set out in pursuit of the second to leave, which was Hoihow. After a 10-hour chase, at 21:07 on 2 July U-181 hit Hoihow with two torpedoes in the Indian Ocean 105 nautical miles (194 km) north-northwest of Mauritius. Hoihow sank by the bow at 19°30′S 55°30′E with the loss of 145 of the 149 people aboard, including Christie, 90 crew members, seven naval gunners, and 47 passengers. The four survivors – three crew members and a passenger – were rescued by the American merchant ship SS Mormacswan, which put them ashore at Montevideo, Uruguay, on 25 July 1943.
