= German submarine U-504 =

German World War II submarine

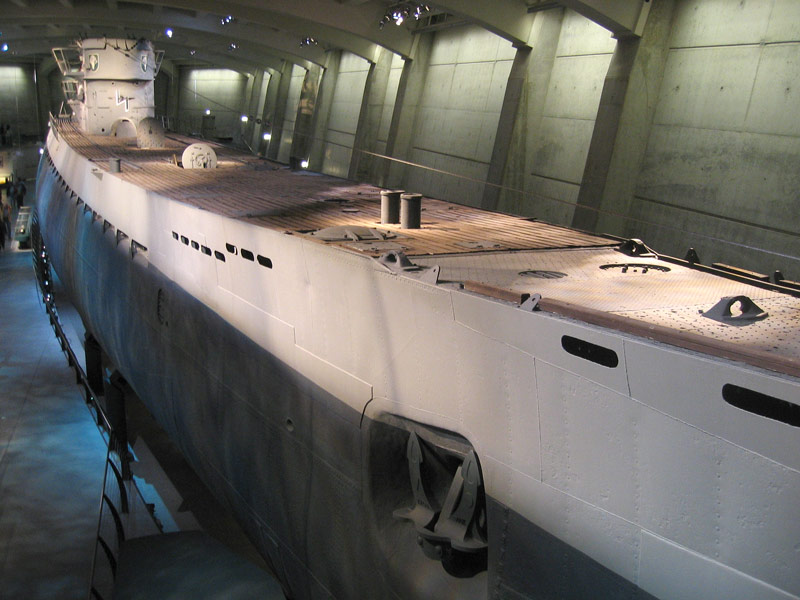
- U-505, a typical Type IXC boat

History

Nazi Germany
- Name: U-504
- Ordered: 25 September 1939
- Builder: Deutsche Werft, Hamburg
- Yard number: 294
- Laid down: 29 April 1940
- Launched: 24 April 1941
- Commissioned: 30 July 1941
- Fate: Sunk on 30 July 1943

General characteristics
- Class & type: Type IXC submarine
- Displacement: 1,120 t (1,100 long tons) surfaced; 1,232 t (1,213 long tons) submerged
- Length: 76.76 m (251 ft 10 in) o/a; 58.75 m (192 ft 9 in) pressure hull
- Beam: 6.76 m (22 ft 2 in) o/a; 4.40 m (14 ft 5 in) pressure hull
- Height: 9.60 m (31 ft 6 in)
- Draught: 4.70 m (15 ft 5 in)
- Installed power: 4,400 PS (3,200 kW; 4,300 bhp) (diesels); 1,000 PS (740 kW; 990 shp) (electric)
- Propulsion: 2 shafts; 2 × diesel engines; 2 × electric motors
- Speed: 18.2 knots (33.7 km/h; 20.9 mph) surfaced; 7.7 knots (14.3 km/h; 8.9 mph) submerged
- Range: 13,450 nmi (24,910 km; 15,480 mi) at 10 knots (19 km/h; 12 mph) surfaced; 64 nmi (119 km; 74 mi) at 4 knots (7.4 km/h; 4.6 mph) submerged
- Test depth: 230 m (750 ft)
- Complement: 4 officers, 44 enlisted
- Armament: 6 × torpedo tubes (4 bow, 2 stern); 22 × 53.3 cm (21 in) torpedoes; 1 × 10.5 cm (4.1 in) SK C/32 deck gun (180 rounds); 1 × 3.7 cm (1.5 in) SK C/30 AA gun; 1 × twin 2 cm FlaK 30 AA guns

Service record
- Part of: 4th U-boat Flotilla; 30 July – 31 December 1941; 2nd U-boat Flotilla; 1 January 1942 – 30 July 1943
- Identification codes: M 45 926
- Commanders: K.Kapt. Hans-Georg Friedrich Poske; 30 July 1941 – 5 January 1943; K.Kapt. Wilhelm Luis; 6 January – 30 July 1943
- Operations: 7 patrols: 1st patrol: 6 – 20 January 1942; 2nd patrol: 25 January – 1 April 1942; 3rd patrol: 2 May – 7 July 1942; 4th patrol: 19 August – 11 December 1942; 5th patrol: 19 January – 24 March 1943; 6th patrol: 21 April – 29 May 1943; 7th patrol: 27 – 30 July 1943
- Victories: 15 merchant ships sunk (78,123 GRT); 1 merchant ship total loss (7,176 GRT)

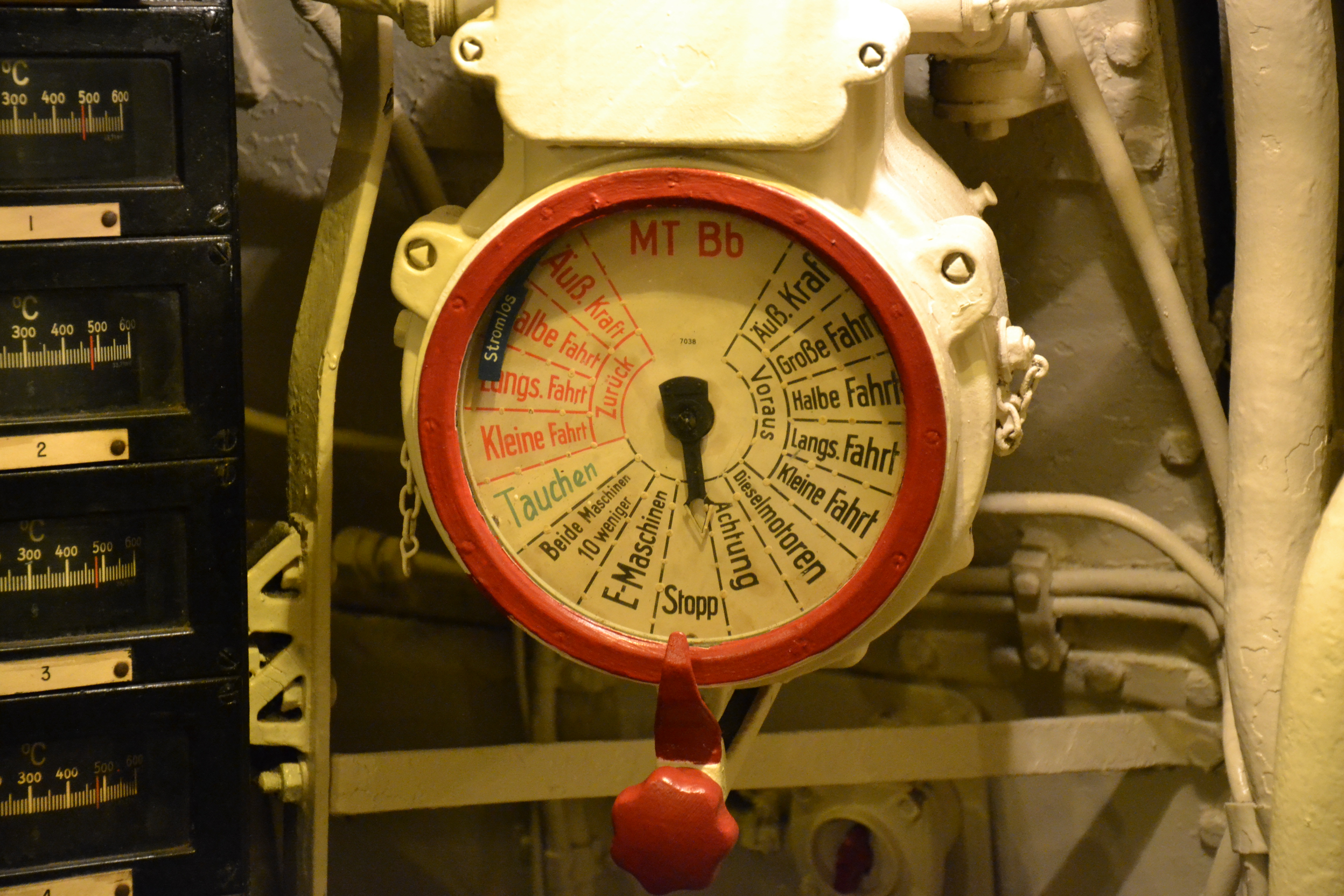
U-504 Submarine Speed Dial

German submarine U-504 was a Type IXC U-boat of Nazi Germany's Kriegsmarine during World War II. The submarine was laid down on 29 April 1940 at the Deutsche Werft yard in Hamburg as yard number 294, launched on 24 April 1941 and commissioned on 30 July 1941 under the command of Korvettenkapitän Hans-Georg Friedrich "Fritz" Poske. Initially attached to the 4th U-boat Flotilla for training, the U-boat was transferred to the 2nd flotilla on 1 January 1942 for front-line service. She was a member of six wolfpacks.

== Design ==
German Type IXC submarines were slightly larger than the original Type IXBs. U-504 had a displacement of 1,120 tonnes (1,100 long tons) when at the surface and 1,232 tonnes (1,213 long tons) while submerged. The U-boat had a total length of 76.76 m (251 ft 10 in), a pressure hull length of 58.75 m (192 ft 9 in), a beam of 6.76 m (22 ft 2 in), a height of 9.60 m (31 ft 6 in), and a draught of 4.70 m (15 ft 5 in). The submarine was powered by two MAN M 9 V 40/46 supercharged four-stroke, nine-cylinder diesel engines producing a total of 4,400 metric horsepower (3,240 kW; 4,340 shp) for use while surfaced, two Siemens-Schuckert 2 GU 345/34 double-acting electric motors producing a total of 1,000 shaft horsepower (1,010 PS; 750 kW) for use while submerged. She had two shafts and two 1.92 m (6 ft) propellers. The boat was capable of operating at depths of up to 230 metres (750 ft).

The submarine had a maximum surface speed of 18.3 knots (33.9 km/h; 21.1 mph) and a maximum submerged speed of 7.3 knots (13.5 km/h; 8.4 mph). When submerged, the boat could operate for 63 nautical miles (117 km; 72 mi) at 4 knots (7.4 km/h; 4.6 mph); when surfaced, she could travel 13,450 nautical miles (24,910 km; 15,480 mi) at 10 knots (19 km/h; 12 mph). U-504 was fitted with six 53.3 cm (21 in) torpedo tubes (four fitted at the bow and two at the stern), 22 torpedoes, one 10.5 cm (4.13 in) SK C/32 naval gun, 180 rounds, and a 3.7 cm (1.5 in) SK C/30 as well as a 2 cm (0.79 in) C/30 anti-aircraft gun. The boat had a complement of forty-eight.

== Service history ==
=== First patrol ===
U-504's first war patrol took her from Kiel in Germany, to her home port of Lorient, in occupied France, between 6 and 20 January 1942 without incident.

=== Second patrol ===
On 25 January 1942 U-504 sailed from Lorient, and headed across the Atlantic to the Florida coast. There, at 04:55 on 22 February, she attacked the unescorted and unarmed American 5,287 GRT tanker Republic about 3.5 nautical miles (6.5 km; 4.0 mi) north-east of Jupiter Inlet Light, Florida. Struck by two torpedoes, the ship settled by the stern, and the crew abandoned ship and rowed to shore. The badly damaged ship eventually drifted onto reefs about five miles (8 km) due east of Hobe Sound, Florida and finally sank on the afternoon of 23 February. Meanwhile, the U-boat sank another ship, torpedoing the unescorted and unarmed American 10,227 GRT tanker W.D. Anderson at 01:32 on 23 February, about 12 nautical miles (22 km; 14 mi) north-east of Jupiter Inlet Light. Loaded with 133,360 barrels (21,203 m^{3}) of crude oil, the ship burst into flames, killing all but one of the crew of 36, and later sank.

U-504 struck again on 26 February sinking the unescorted Dutch 8,245 GRT tanker Mamura about 230 nautical miles (430 km; 260 mi) off the coast of Florida. The ship, loaded with gasoline, was hit by two torpedoes, setting it on fire and breaking it in two. The ship sank within eight minutes, killing all 49 of the crew.

U-504's final victim was the unescorted British 5,966 GRT merchant ship Stangarth, sunk on 16 March, by a single torpedo, north-east of San Juan, Puerto Rico. There were no survivors from her crew of 46. U-504 arrived back at Lorient on 1 April after 67 days at sea.

=== Third patrol ===
The U-boat then sailed for a patrol in the Caribbean Sea, departing Lorient on 2 May 1942. Her first success came on 29 May when she sank the unescorted British 1,597 GRT cargo ship Allister, en route from Kingston, Jamaica, to Tampa, Florida, with a cargo of 500 tons of bananas. The ship was torpedoed 54 nautical miles (100 km; 62 mi) south of Grand Cayman Island, losing 15 of her crew of 23.

On 8 June U-504 struck twice, east of the Yucatán Peninsula. At 06:59 she sank the unescorted 3,901 GRT Honduran merchant ship Tela with two torpedoes, sinking her within five minutes. At 18:06 the U-boat opened fire with her deck gun on the unescorted British 1,512 GRT merchant ship Rosenborg, after missing the ship with two torpedoes. She fired 60 shells, of which about 30 hit. Four of the crew were killed, the remaining 23 were later picked up and landed in Panama.

The U-boat struck again twice in a single day, 11 June, off Honduras. She sank the unescorted Dutch 4,282 GRT passenger ship Crijnssen at 02:10 with three torpedoes, then the unescorted and unarmed American 4,846 GRT merchant ship American at 18:01. The ship, carrying 6,500 tons of manganese ore, coffee, gunny sacks, jute and oil, from Santos, Brazil, to New Orleans, was hit by two torpedoes, and then a third eleven minutes later. The ship sank in 25 minutes. The crew of eight officers and 30 men abandoned ship. Finally, on 14 June, she torpedoed and sank the Latvian 3,280 GRT cargo ship Regent. U-504 arrived back at Lorient on 7 July after 67 days at sea.

=== Fourth patrol ===
U-504 left Lorient again on 19 August 1942 and sailed south to the waters off South Africa as part of Wolfpack Eisbär. There, on 17 October, about 450 nautical miles (830 km; 520 mi) south of Cape Town, she torpedoed and sank the unescorted British 5,970 GRT Empire Chaucer. On the 23rd she sank the British 5,669 GRT City of Johannesburg, and on the 26th she attacked the unescorted American 7,176 GRT Liberty ship Anne Hutchinson. The crew abandoned their vessel after she was hit by two torpedoes and fatally damaged. However the ship remained afloat, and on the 29th was taken in tow by the South African armed trawler HMSAS David Haigh (T13) and a harbour tug. Lacking sufficient power to tow the ship to port explosive charges were set, cutting the ship in two. The aft section sank, and the fore section was towed into Port Elizabeth. Part of the crew were picked up at sea, while the rest made it to land in their lifeboats.

U-504 sank two more British merchant ships on 31 October, about 200 nautical miles (370 km; 230 mi) east of Durban. First the unescorted 7,041 GRT Empire Guidon, then the unescorted 5,113 GRT Reynolds, which, hit amidships and in the stern, capsized and sank within seconds.

Finally on 3 November she sank the unescorted and unarmed Brazilian 5,187 GRT cargo ship Porto Alegre en route from Rio de Janeiro to Durban, off Port Elizabeth. Hit by a single torpedo, the crew abandoned ship before the U-boat delivered the coup de grâce. Only one crew member was lost. The survivors were questioned by the Germans, and later made landfall about 50 nautical miles (93 km; 58 mi) from Port Elizabeth on 7 November. U-504 arrived back at Lorient on 11 December 1942 after a patrol lasting 115 days.

=== Fifth and sixth patrol ===
U-504 left Lorient on 19 January 1943, now under the command of Kapitänleutnant Wilhelm Luis, and headed out into the Atlantic waters south of the Azores. She was subjected to attacks by unidentified Allied aircraft outbound on 21 January and inbound on 12 March, but was not damaged by either. She returned to Lorient on 24 March after 65 days at sea, without making any successful attacks.

Her next patrol took her to the waters south of Greenland between 21 April and 29 May 1943, again without result.

=== Seventh patrol ===
U-504's final patrol began on 27 July 1943 under the newly promoted Korvettenkapitän Wilhelm Luis. On 30 July the U-boat was sunk with all 53 hands, north-west of Cape Ortegal, Spain, at position 45°33′N 10°56′W, by depth charges from the British Black Swan-class sloops HMS Kite, Woodpecker, Wren and Wild Goose.

=== Wolfpacks ===
U-504 took part in six wolfpacks, namely:

- Eisbär (25 August – 1 September 1942)
- Rochen (16 February – 1 March 1943)
- Tümmler (1 – 22 March 1943)
- Amsel 1 (3 – 6 May 1943)
- Elbe (7 – 10 May 1943)
- Elbe 2 (10 – 14 May 1943)

== Summary of raiding history ==
Date	Ship Name	Nationality	Tonnage (GRT)	Fate
22 February 1942	Republic	United States	5,287	Sunk
23 February 1942	W.D. Anderson	United States	10,227	Sunk
26 February 1942	Mamura	Netherlands	8,245	Sunk
16 March 1942	Stangarth	United Kingdom	5,966	Sunk
29 May 1942	Allister	United Kingdom	1,597	Sunk
8 June 1942	Rosenborg	United Kingdom	1,512	Sunk
8 June 1942	Tela	Honduras	3,901	Sunk
11 June 1942	American	United States	4,846	Sunk
11 June 1942	Crijnssen	Netherlands	4,282	Sunk
14 June 1942	Regent	Latvia	3,280	Sunk
17 October 1942	Empire Chaucer	United Kingdom	5,970	Sunk
23 October 1942	City of Johannesburg	United Kingdom	5,669	Sunk
26 October 1942	Anne Hutchinson	United States	7,176	Total loss
31 October 1942	Empire Guidon	United Kingdom	7,041	Sunk
31 October 1942	Reynolds	United Kingdom	5,113	Sunk
3 November 1942	Porto Alegre	Brazil	5,187	Sunk

== Bibliography ==
- Busch, Rainer; Röll, Hans-Joachim (1999). German U-boat commanders of World War II : a biographical dictionary. Translated by Brooks, Geoffrey. London, Annapolis, Md: Greenhill Books, Naval Institute Press. ISBN 1-55750-186-6.
- Busch, Rainer; Röll, Hans-Joachim (1999). Deutsche U-Boot-Verluste von September 1939 bis Mai 1945 [German U-boat losses from September 1939 to May 1945]. Der U-Boot-Krieg (in German). Vol. IV. Hamburg, Berlin, Bonn: Mittler. ISBN 3-8132-0514-2.
- Gröner, Erich; Jung, Dieter; Maass, Martin (1991). U-boats and Mine Warfare Vessels. German Warships 1815–1945. Vol. 2. Translated by Thomas, Keith; Magowan, Rachel. London: Conway Maritime Press. ISBN 0-85177-593-4.
