= German submarine U-181 =

German World War II submarine

History

Germany
- Name: U-181
- Ordered: 15 August 1940
- Builder: DeSchiMAG AG Weser, Bremen
- Yard number: 1021
- Laid down: 15 March 1941
- Launched: 30 December 1941
- Commissioned: 9 May 1942
- Fate: Taken over by Imperial Japanese Navy on 6 May 1945

Japan
- Name: I-501
- Acquired: 6 May 1945
- Commissioned: 15 July 1945
- Fate: Surrendered, August 1945; Sunk on 12 February 1946

General characteristics
- Class & type: Type IXD2 submarine
- Displacement: 1,610 t (1,580 long tons) surfaced; 1,799 t (1,771 long tons) submerged
- Length: 87.58 m (287 ft 4 in) o/a; 68.50 m (224 ft 9 in) pressure hull
- Beam: 7.50 m (24 ft 7 in) o/a; 4.40 m (14 ft 5 in) pressure hull
- Height: 10.20 m (33 ft 6 in)
- Draught: 5.35 m (17 ft 7 in)
- Installed power: 9,000 PS (6,620 kW; 8,880 bhp) (diesels); 1,000 PS (740 kW; 990 shp) (electric)
- Propulsion: 2 shafts; 2 × diesel engines; 2 × electric motors
- Speed: 20.8 knots (38.5 km/h; 23.9 mph) surfaced; 6.9 knots (12.8 km/h; 7.9 mph) surfaced
- Range: 12,750 nmi (23,610 km) at 10 knots (19 km/h) surfaced; 57 nmi (106 km) at 4 knots (7.4 km/h) submerged
- Test depth: Calculated crush depth: 230 m (754 ft 7 in)
- Boats & landing craft carried: 2 dinghies
- Complement: 4-7 officers, 51-57 enlisted
- Armament: 6 × torpedo tubes (four bow, two stern); 24 × 53.3 cm (21 in) torpedoes; 1 × 10.5 cm (4.1 in) SK C/32 deck gun (150 rounds); 1 × 3.7 cm (1.5 in) SK C/30; 2 × 2 cm (0.79 in) C/30 anti-aircraft guns

Service record (Kriegsmarine)
- Part of: 4th U-boat Flotilla; 9 May – 30 September 1942; 10th U-boat Flotilla; 1 – 31 October 1942; 12th U-boat Flotilla; 1 November 1942 – 30 September 1944; 33rd U-boat Flotilla; 1 October 1944 – 5 May 1945
- Identification codes: M 45 435
- Commanders: K.Kapt. Wolfgang Lüth; 9 May 1942 – 31 October 1943; F.Kapt. / Kapt.z.S. Kurt Freiwald; 1 November 1943 – 5 May 1945
- Operations: 4 patrols: 1st patrol: 12 September 1942 – 18 January 1943; 2nd patrol: 23 March – 14 October 1943; 3rd patrol: a. 16 March – 8 August 1944; b. 30 – 31 August 1944; c. 23 – 25 September 1944; 4th patrol: a. 19 October 1944 – 5 January 1945; b. 14 – 16 January 1945
- Victories: 27 merchant ships sunk (138,779 GRT)

Service record (IJN)
- Part of: 1st Southern Expeditionary Fleet; 15 July – August 1945
- Commanders: Kaigun-shōsa Kiyoteru Sato; 15 July – August 1945
- Operations: None
- Victories: None

German submarine U-181 was a Type IXD2 U-boat of Germany's Kriegsmarine during World War II. The submarine was laid down on 15 March 1941 at the DeSchiMAG AG Weser yard at Bremen as yard number 1021. She was launched on 30 December 1941 and commissioned on 9 May 1942 under the command of Kapitänleutnant Wolfgang Lüth. After training with the 4th U-boat Flotilla at Stettin, U-181 was attached to the 10th flotilla for front-line service on 1 October 1942, then transferred to the 12th flotilla on 1 November.

== Design ==
German Type IXD2 submarines were considerably larger than the original Type IXs. U-181 had a displacement of 1,610 tonnes (1,580 long tons) when at the surface and 1,799 tonnes (1,771 long tons) while submerged. The U-boat had a total length of 87.58 m (287 ft 4 in), a pressure hull length of 68.50 m (224 ft 9 in), a beam of 7.50 m (24 ft 7 in), a height of 10.20 m (33 ft 6 in), and a draught of 5.35 m (17 ft 7 in). The submarine was powered by two MAN M 9 V 40/46 supercharged four-stroke, nine-cylinder diesel engines plus two MWM RS34.5S six-cylinder four-stroke diesel engines for cruising, producing a total of 9,000 metric horsepower (6,620 kW; 8,880 shp) for use while surfaced, two Siemens-Schuckert 2 GU 345/34 double-acting electric motors producing a total of 1,000 shaft horsepower (1,010 PS; 750 kW) for use while submerged. She had two shafts and two 1.85 m (6 ft) propellers. The boat was capable of operating at depths of up to 200 metres (660 ft).

The submarine had a maximum surface speed of 20.8 knots (38.5 km/h; 23.9 mph) and a maximum submerged speed of 6.9 knots (12.8 km/h; 7.9 mph). When submerged, the boat could operate for 121 nautical miles (224 km; 139 mi) at 2 knots (3.7 km/h; 2.3 mph); when surfaced, she could travel 12,750 nautical miles (23,610 km; 14,670 mi) at 10 knots (19 km/h; 12 mph). U-181 was fitted with six 53.3 cm (21 in) torpedo tubes (four fitted at the bow and two at the stern), 24 torpedoes, one 10.5 cm (4.13 in) SK C/32 naval gun, 150 rounds, and a 3.7 cm (1.5 in) SK C/30 with 2575 rounds as well as one 2 cm (0.79 in) C/38 anti-aircraft guns with 8100 rounds. The boat had a complement of fifty-five.

== Operational history ==
Under Lüth's command she sailed on two long combat patrols in late 1942 and 1943, patrolling the waters off South Africa and Mozambique. On 15 November 1942, HMS Jasmine, along with HMS Inconstant and HMS Nigella engaged the submarine with depth charges forcing the submarine to a depth of 570ft but failed to destroy her. During the patrol between 1942 and 1943, the submarine was responsible for sinking 22 ships for a total of 103,712 GRT, earning him a promotion to Korvettenkapitän and the Knight's Cross of the Iron Cross with Oak Leaves, Swords and Diamonds. He went on to command the 22nd U-boat Flotilla.

On 1 November 1943 under the command of Fregattenkapitän Kurt Freiwald and part of the 12th U-boat Flotilla. U-181 sailed from her base in Bordeaux, France to Penang, Malaya (now Malaysia) in mid–1944, sinking four ships totalling 24,869 GRT. They carried a Bachstelze and a Naxos radar detector on this trip. On 1 October 1944 the U-boat was transferred to the 33rd U-boat Flotilla. She carried out only one additional patrol in the Indian Ocean, in 1944–1945, on their journey home with 130 tons of tin, 20 tons of molybdenum, 80-100 tons of raw rubber, and the latest radar-detection equipment FUMB26 TUNIS. They ended up sinking a single ship of 10,198 GRT. Because of their cargo, they only had room for two torpedoes, which they used in this sinking. The trip home was aborted when the main bearings started to wear out, prompting a return to Batavia on 6 January 1945, but transferring their fuel to U-843 near the Cocos Islands on the way.

On the 12th, they were ordered to Penang, but only made it as far as Singapore. There they worked on repairing the engines and fitting a Schnorchel, before attempting a renewed trip home starting on 10 May.

=== Wolfpacks ===
U-181 took part in one wolfpack from 27 to 30 March 1943.

=== Fate ===
On 6 May, Otto Giese dropped the two code-key machines into the Singapore harbor, and later that day, the boat was "taken" by the Japanese Captain Marujama. Admiral Paul Wenneker sent the message on 8 May, that Lubeck was in place, "an early agreement between Germany and Japan, if one nation lost and the other continued fighting, the former would render its war material to the latter." The crew was taken to Batu Pahat.

After Germany's surrender in May 1945 the U-boat was taken over by Japan at Singapore and commissioned as I-501 on 15 July 1945. She surrendered to Allied forces there in August 1945, and was sunk on 12 February 1946 in the Strait of Malacca, in position 03°05′50″N 100°41′50″E, by the British frigates HMS Loch Glendhu and HMS Loch Lomond.

== Summary of raiding history ==
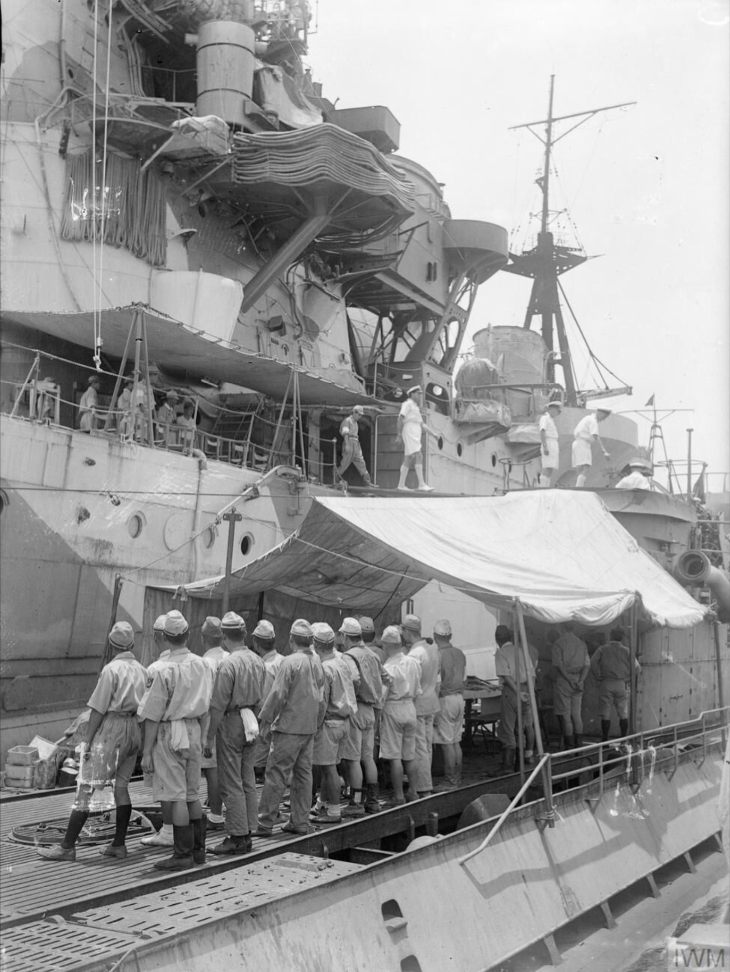
U-boat (either U-181 or U-862) moored next to the Japanese cruiser Myōkō

Date	Ship	Nationality	Tonnage (GRT)	Fate
1st patrol
3 November 1942	East Indian	United States	8,159	Sunk
8 November 1942	Plaudit	Panama	5,060	Sunk
10 November 1942	K.G. Meldahl	Norway	3,799	Sunk
13 November 1942	Excello	United States	4,969	Sunk
19 November 1942	Gunda	Norway	2,241	Sunk
20 November 1942	Corinthiakos	Greece	3,562	Sunk
22 November 1942	Alcoa Pathfinder	United States	6,797	Sunk
24 November 1942	Dorington Court	United Kingdom	5,281	Sunk
24 November 1942	Mount Helmos	Greece	6,481	Sunk
28 November 1942	Evanthia	Greece	3,551	Sunk
30 November 1942	Cleanthis	Greece	4,153	Sunk
2 December 1942	Amarylis	Panama	4,328	Sunk
2nd patrol
11 April 1943	Empire Whimbrel	United Kingdom	5,983	Sunk
11 May 1943	Tinhow	United Kingdom	5,232	Sunk
27 May 1943	Sicilia	Sweden	1,633	Sunk
7 June 1943	Harrier	South Africa	193	Sunk
2 July 1943	Hoihow	United Kingdom	2,798	Sunk
15 July 1943	Empire Lake	United Kingdom	2,852	Sunk
16 July 1943	Fort Franklin	United Kingdom	7,135	Sunk
4 August 1943	Dalfram	United Kingdom	4,558	Sunk
7 August 1943	Umvuma	United Kingdom	4,419	Sunk
12 August 1943	Clan Macarthur	United Kingdom	10,528	Sunk
3rd patrol
1 May 1944	Janeta	United Kingdom	5,312	Sunk
19 June 1944	Garoet	Netherlands	7,118	Sunk
15 July 1944	Tanda	United Kingdom	7,174	Sunk
19 July 1944	King Frederick	United Kingdom	5,265	Sunk
4th patrol
2 November 1944	Fort Lee	United States	10,198	Sunk
