= East Indian (1918 ship) =

US-owned cargo ship sunk in 1942

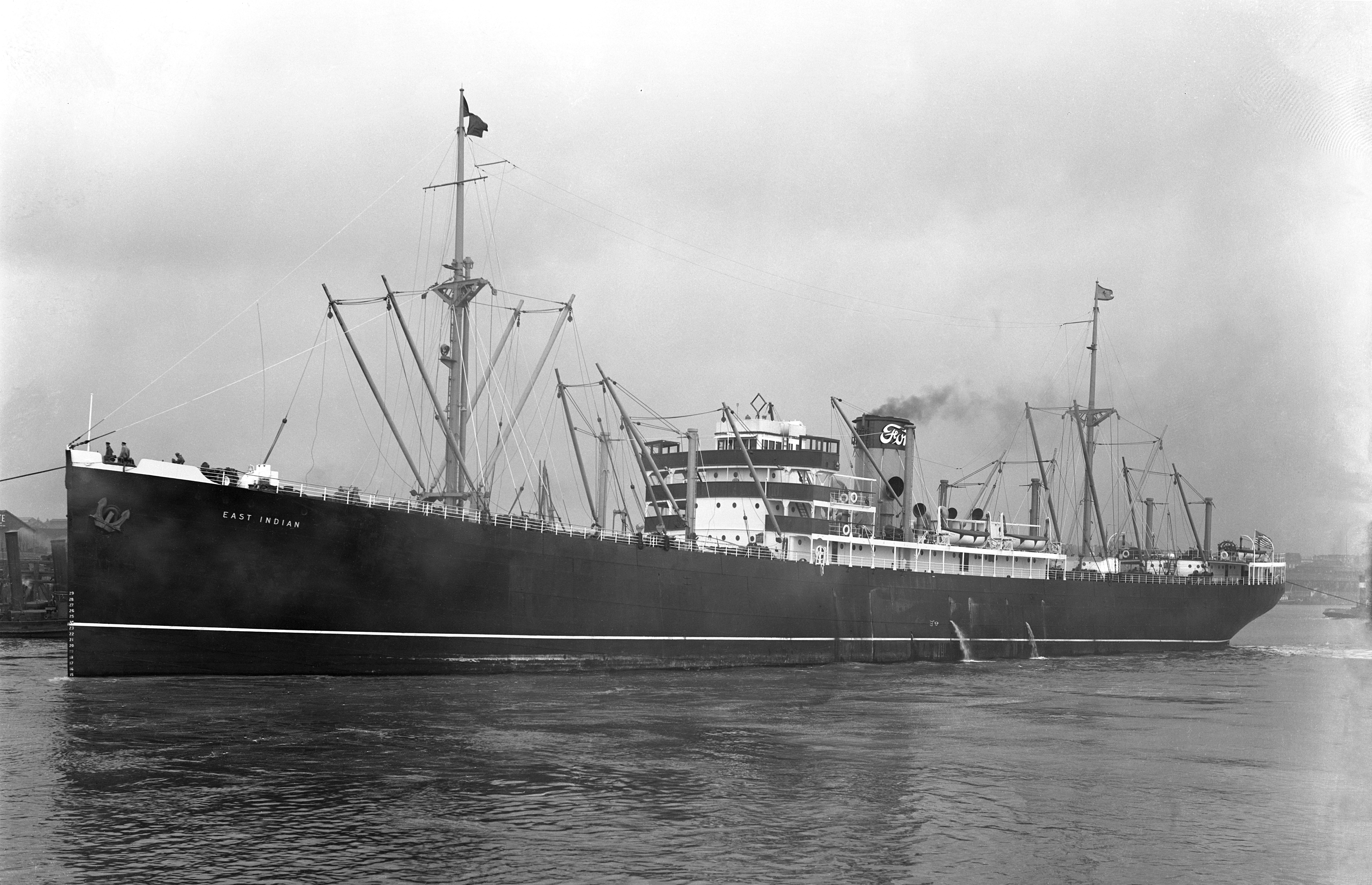
- East Indian, probably in the Scheldt

History

United States
- Name: 1918: Beikoku Maru; 1918: East Indian
- Owner: 1918: US Shipping Board; 1925: Ford Motor Co
- Port of registry: 1918: San Francisco; 1925: Detroit
- Builder: Uraga Dock Co, Uraga
- Yard number: 138
- Completed: July 1918
- Identification: US official number 216802; 1918: code letters LMQC; by 1934: call sign WGEI
- Fate: torpedoed 1942

General characteristics
- Type: cargo ship
- Tonnage: 8,183 GRT, 5,966 NRT
- Length: 461.0 ft (140.5 m) overall; 445.0 ft (135.6 m) registered
- Beam: 58.0 ft (17.7 m)
- Draft: 28 ft 8 in (8.7 m)
- Depth: 29.0 ft (8.8 m)
- Decks: 2
- Installed power: 1918: 2 × triple-expansion engines; 703 NHP; 1926: 2 × two-stroke diesel engines; 1,112 NHP
- Propulsion: 2 × screws
- Speed: 1926: 11 1/2 knots (21 km/h)
- Capacity: 12 passengers
- Crew: 1942: 47 officers & men, + 15 Armed Guards
- Sensors & processing systems: 1926: submarine signalling; wireless direction finding; 1934: as above, plus echo sounding device; gyrocompass
- Armament: in Second World War: 1 × 4-inch (100 mm) naval gun; 2 × .50 caliber machine guns; 2 × .30 caliber machine guns

East Indian was a twin-screw cargo ship that was built in Japan in 1918 as Beikoku Maru. The United States Shipping Board (USSB) bought her that same year and renamed her East Indian. The Ford Motor Company bought her in 1925 to transport Ford products overseas. She was sunk in the South Atlantic in 1942. Only 16 of 74 people aboard survived.

Beikoku Maru was built as a steamship. Ford had East Indian re-engined as a motor ship. When converted, she was the most powerful motor ship in the US merchant fleet.

== Building ==
The Uraga Dock Company in Uraga, Kanagawa built the ship as Beikoku Maru, completing her in July 1918. Her lengths were 461.0 ft (140.5 m) overall and 445.0 ft (135.6 m) registered. Her beam was 58.0 ft (17.7 m), her depth was 29.0 ft (8.8 m) and her draft was 28 ft 8 in (8.7 m). Her tonnages were 8,183 GRT and 5,966 NRT.

As built, the ship had a pair of three-cylinder triple-expansion steam engines, to which four single-ended boilers supplied steam at 200 psi. The combined power of her twin engines was rated at 703 NHP.

== Ownership and registration ==
The USSB bought Beikoku Maru, renamed her East Indian, and registered her at San Francisco. Her US official number was 216802 and her code letters were LMQC. In 1925 the Ford Motor Company bought her and registered her in Detroit.

== Ford fleet ==
Ford had East Indian re-engined with a pair of Sun Shipbuilding & Drydock Co. four-cylinder two-stroke diesel engines. Their combined power was rated at 1,112 NHP, which at that time made her the most powerful motor ship in the US merchant fleet. submarine signalling and wireless direction finding were added to her navigation equipment.

East Indian was too long to pass through the locks of the St. Lawrence Seaway. She joined Ford's ocean-going fleet, exporting vehicles and parts overseas.

In 1934 the call sign WGEI superseded East Indian's code letters. In the same year, an echo sounding device and a gyrocompass were added to her navigation equipment.

== Loss ==
In December 1941 the US entered the Second World War. Early in 1942 the War Shipping Administration time chartered East Indian. She was defensively armed with one four-inch gun on her poop, plus two .50 caliber machine guns and two .30 caliber guns for anti-aircraft defense.

Later that year, East Indian left Calcutta for New York via Cape Town and Punta Arenas. However, a pair of German spies in Panaji in neutral Portuguese Goa was passing details of Allied ship movements to a DDG Hansa cargo ship, Ehrenfels, that was sheltering in the Goanese port of Mormugao. Ehrenfels used a secret radio transmitter to pass the information to U-boats in the Indian Ocean.

East Indian called at Cape Town as planned. She left carrying 3,500 tons of manganese ore, 500 tons of tea, and 560 tons of general cargo. 74 people were aboard: her Master, Captain Ovide Sainte-Marie; seven other officers; 39 enlisted men; 15 Armed Guards; and 12 passengers. She was unescorted; steering a defensive zigzag course; and making 11 1/2 knots (21 km/h).

At 16:22 hrs on 3 November 1942, East Indian was about 300 nautical miles (560 km) southwest of the Cape of Good Hope when U-181 hit her starboard side with two torpedoes. One hit the after bulkhead of her engine room. She sank within two minutes at position 37°23′S 13°34′E, killing Captain Sainte-Marie, 15 of the crew, and seven of the passengers. One lifeboat and four liferafts floated clear. 17 survivors boarded the lifeboat; the remainder boarded the rafts.

== Lifeboat and rafts ==
Ten minutes after the sinking, U-181 surfaced, and a German officer questioned East Indian's Third Officer, Patrick Keenan. The officer told Keenan that the U-boat had sighted East Indian that morning, and had followed her for 100 nautical miles (190 km) before it was able to attack. The German crew gave the survivors water, and a course back to Cape Town.

13 days later a ship found the lifeboat and rescued its occupants 135 nautical miles (250 km) south of Cape Town. After the survivors reached shore, East Indian's wireless operator died of hypothermia. Sources state that a British merchant steamship called Durando rescued the men, and that Durando was later sunk with all hands on her way back to Britain. However, Lloyd's Register of Shipping at that time listed no ship called Durando, British or otherwise. The sources may mean the British India Steam Navigation Company ship Durenda, which called at Cape Town on 17 November 1942. However, Durenda survived the war, and was scrapped in 1960.

None of the men on the rafts was rescued. On 29 June 1943 newspapers including The New York Times, The Washington Daily News and the Imperial Valley Press published a United Press report claiming that one of East Indian's rafts was found ashore near Maceió, Brazil. The report claimed that on the raft were the dead body of one man, and a log written on a sail saying that six men from East Indian had been on the raft.

== Bibliography ==
- Haws, Duncan (1987). British India S.N. Co. Merchant Fleets. Vol. 11. Burwash: Travel Creatours Ltd Publications. ISBN 0-946378-07-X.
- Lloyd's Register of Shipping. Vol. II.–Steamers. London: Lloyd's Register of Shipping. 1919 – via Internet Archive.
- Lloyd's Register of Shipping. Vol. II.–Steamers and Motorships. London: Lloyd's Register of Shipping. 1926 – via Internet Archive.
- Lloyd's Register of Shipping (PDF). Vol. II.–Steamers and Motorships of 300 tons gross and over. London: Lloyd's Register of Shipping. 1934 – via Southampton City Council.
