= German submarine U-156 (1941) =

German World War II submarine

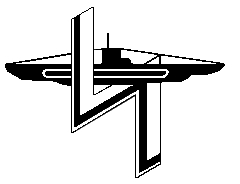
- Conning tower emblem of U-156

History

Nazi Germany
- Name: U-156
- Ordered: 25 September 1939
- Builder: DeSchiMAG AG Weser, Bremen
- Yard number: 998
- Laid down: 11 October 1940
- Launched: 21 May 1941
- Commissioned: 4 September 1941
- Fate: Sunk on 8 March 1943

General characteristics
- Class & type: Type IXC submarine
- Displacement: 1,120 t (1,100 long tons) surfaced; 1,232 t (1,213 long tons) submerged
- Length: 76.76 m (251 ft 10 in) o/a; 58.75 m (192 ft 9 in) pressure hull
- Beam: 6.76 m (22 ft 2 in) o/a; 4.40 m (14 ft 5 in) pressure hull
- Height: 9.60 m (31 ft 6 in)
- Draught: 4.70 m (15 ft 5 in)
- Installed power: 4,400 PS (3,200 kW; 4,300 bhp) (diesels); 1,000 PS (740 kW; 990 shp) (electric)
- Propulsion: 2 shafts; 2 × diesel engines; 2 × electric motors
- Speed: 18.3 knots (33.9 km/h; 21.1 mph) surfaced; 7.3 knots (13.5 km/h; 8.4 mph) submerged
- Range: 13,450 nmi (24,910 km; 15,480 mi) at 10 knots (19 km/h; 12 mph) surfaced; 64 nmi (119 km; 74 mi) at 4 knots (7.4 km/h; 4.6 mph) submerged
- Test depth: 230 m (750 ft)
- Complement: 48 to 56
- Armament: 6 × torpedo tubes (4 bow, 2 stern); 22 × 53.3 cm (21 in) torpedoes; 1 × 10.5 cm (4.1 in) SK C/32 deck gun (180 rounds); 1 × 3.7 cm (1.5 in) SK C/30 AA gun; 1 × twin 2 cm FlaK 30 AA guns

Service record
- Part of: 4th U-boat Flotilla; 4 September – 31 December 1941; 2nd U-boat Flotilla; 1 January 1942 – 8 March 1943
- Identification codes: M 01 308
- Commanders: K.Kapt. Werner Hartenstein; 4 September 1941 – 8 March 1943
- Operations: 5 patrols: 1st patrol: 24 December 1941 – 10 January 1942; 2nd patrol: 19 January – 17 March 1942; 3rd patrol: 22 April – 7 July 1942; 4th patrol: 20 August – 16 November 1942; 5th patrol: 16 January – 8 March 1943
- Victories: 19 merchant ships sunk (97,489 GRT); 3 merchant ships damaged (18,811 GRT); 1 warship damaged (1,190 tons)

German submarine U-156 was a Type IXC U-boat of Nazi Germany's Kriegsmarine built for service during World War II. The keel for this boat was laid on 11 October 1940 at the DeSchiMAG AG Weser yard in Bremen, Germany, as yard number 998. She was commissioned on 4 September 1941 under the command of Kapitänleutnant Werner Hartenstein (Knight of the Iron Cross). The city of Plauen, Hartenstein's home city, adopted the submarine within the then-popular sponsorship programme (Patenschaftsprogramm), organising gifts and holidays for the crew.

The U-boat took part in five patrols, which included attacks on shipping in which she sank 20 merchantmen, damaged another three merchantmen, and damaged the American destroyer USS Blakeley. On February 16th, 1942, her attacks on Aruba’s oil refineries, Lago Oil and Transport Company and Arend Petroleum Company, resulted in four fallen Dutch marines.

U-156 was the main participant in the Laconia incident in September 1942, during which she torpedoed and sank the troopship Laconia west of Africa. Whilst rescuing the survivors and flying the Red Cross flag, the U-boat was attacked by an American aircraft and forced to dive, resulting in the shipwrecked survivors being cast back into the sea. The incident led to the Laconia Order, banning U-boats from attempting rescues, and later caused major embarrassment to the US during the Nuremberg trials. U-156 was attacked with depth charges by an American aircraft east of the island of Barbados on 8 March 1943. She sank with the loss of all hands.

== Design ==
German Type IXC submarines were slightly larger than the original Type IXBs. U-156 had a displacement of 1,120 tonnes (1,100 long tons) when at the surface and 1,232 tonnes (1,213 long tons) while submerged. The U-boat had a total length of 76.76 m (251 ft 10 in), a pressure hull length of 58.75 m (192 ft 9 in), a beam of 6.76 m (22 ft 2 in), a height of 9.60 m (31 ft 6 in), and a draught of 4.70 m (15 ft 5 in). The submarine was powered by two MAN M 9 V 40/46 supercharged, four-stroke, nine-cylinder, diesel engines producing a total of 4,400 metric horsepower (3,240 kW; 4,340 shp) for use while surfaced, and two Siemens-Schuckert 2 GU 345/34 double-acting electric motors producing a total of 1,000 metric horsepower (740 kW; 990 shp) for use while submerged. She had two shafts and two 1.92 m (6 ft) propellers. The boat was capable of operating at depths down to 230 metres (750 ft).

The submarine had a maximum surface speed of 18.3 knots (33.9 km/h; 21.1 mph) and a maximum submerged speed of 7.3 knots (13.5 km/h; 8.4 mph). When submerged, the boat could operate for 63 nautical miles (117 km; 72 mi) at 4 knots (7.4 km/h; 4.6 mph); when surfaced, she could travel 13,450 nautical miles (24,910 km; 15,480 mi) at 10 knots (19 km/h; 12 mph). U-156 was fitted with six 53.3 cm (21 in) torpedo tubes (four fitted at the bow and two at the stern), 22 torpedoes, one 10.5 cm (4.13 in) SK C/32 naval gun, 180 rounds, and a 3.7 cm (1.5 in) SK C/30, as well as a 2 cm (0.79 in) C/30 antiaircraft gun. The boat had a complement of 48.

== Service history ==
Built at DeSchiMAG, Bremen, and commissioned by Kptlt. Werner Hartenstein, the boat was assigned in September 1941 to the 4th U-boat Flotilla for training. She conducted her first patrol from that same month, during which her crew trained, and at the end of which she arrived at her operations base in Lorient, France, in December 1941. From that moment, she was assigned to the 2. Unterseebootsflottille based at that port, from where all her operational patrols departed.

During the three patrols completed in 1942, U-156 sank 19 ships for a total of 97,489 gross register tons (GRT); in addition, three ships were damaged for a total of 18,811 GRT and one warship was damaged for a total of 1,190 tons.

=== Aruba attack ===
During her second patrol, U-156 participated in Operation Neuland, which intended to disrupt traffic in the Caribbean, and included an attack on the oil refinery at Aruba, ordered by Captain Hartenstein.

At the beginning of the attack on the Lago Oil and Transport Company San Nicolaas refinery, the deck gun exploded because the cap or tampion in the muzzle of the gun, which prevented water from entering the barrel, was not removed before firing. This accident saved what was at the time the world's largest refinery.

As a result of the accident, Matrosengefreiter (equivalent to Able Seaman or Leading Seaman) Heinrich Bussinger was killed, and Gunnery Officer Dietrich von dem Borne lost his right leg in the explosion. He was taken below and the boat submerged and left the waters off the coast of Aruba. Von dem Borne was put ashore on the island of Martinique for medical treatment and survived the war. The stop at Martinique, at the time part of Vichy France contributed to the worsening of diplomatic relations between the US and Vichy France.

=== Laconia incident ===
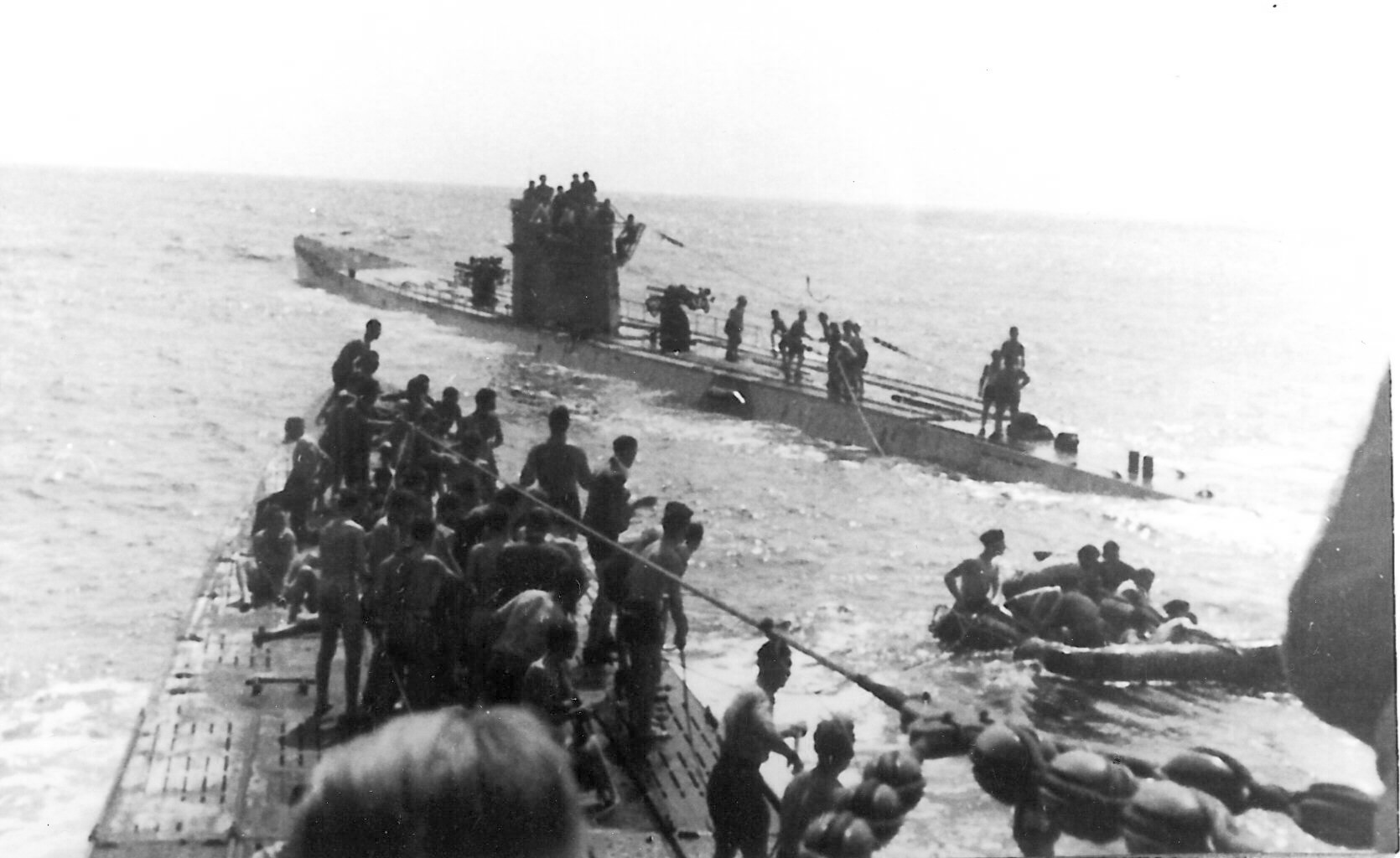
U-156 (foreground) and U-507 picking up shipwrecked RMS Laconia crew and passengers

On 12 September 1942, U-156 hit the British troopship Laconia on the starboard side with a torpedo. The troopship, carrying 463 officers and crew, 80 civilians, 286 British Army soldiers, 1,793 Italian prisoners of war (POWs), and 103 Polish soldiers (guards) off the coast of West Africa, was hit by a second torpedo on Number Two hold and sank. After realising that the passengers were primarily POWs and civilians, the U-boat started rescue operations while flying the Red Cross flag. A U.S. Army Air Corps bomber flying out of a secret South Atlantic airbase on Ascension Island attacked the U-boat. The U-boat abandoned the rescue effort and left the survivors to drift to Africa. Over half the survivors died. This incident led to German Admiral Karl Dönitz issuing the Laconia Order on 17 September 1942, which forbade submarine commanders from rescuing survivors from torpedoed ships.

=== Fate ===
During her fifth patrol, in which she sank no shipping and made no attacks, U-156 was attacked twice. As a result of the second attack, on 8 March 1943, she was sunk approximately 280 nautical miles (520 km; 320 mi) east of the island of Barbados, in position 12°38′N 54°39′W, by a US PBY Catalina aircraft from VP-53. The aircraft dropped four Mark 44 Torpex-filled depth charges at 13:15 from an altitude of 75 to 100 feet (23 to 30 m), which straddled the submarine. Two were observed to hit the water 10 to 15 feet (3.0 to 4.6 m) starboard and just aft of U-156, lifting her and breaking her in two, followed by an explosion. At least 11 survivors were seen swimming in the water. Two rubber rafts and rations were dropped, and five men were seen to reach one of the rafts. USS Barney was dispatched from Trinidad to rescue the survivors, but without success; the search was abandoned on 12 March 1943.

== Patrols ==
	Commander	Departure		Arrival		Duration	Victories
1	Kptlt. Werner Hartenstein	24 December 1941	Kiel	10 January 1942	Lorient	18 days	
2	Kptlt. Werner Hartenstein	19 January 1942	Lorient	17 March 1942	Lorient	58 days	33,492 GRT
3	Kptlt. Werner Hartenstein	22 April 1942	Lorient	7 July 1942	Lorient	77 days	53,617 GRT
4	K.Kapt. Werner Hartenstein	20 August 1942	Lorient	16 November 1942	Lorient	89 days	30,381 GRT
5	K.Kapt. Werner Hartenstein	16 January 1943	Lorient	8 March 1943	sunk	52 days	
Total						294 days	117,490 GRT

Note : Kptlt.=Kapitänleutnant – K.Kapt.=Korvettenkapitän

=== Wolfpacks ===
U-156 took part in one wolfpack, namely:

- Eisbär (25 August – 1 September 1942)

== Summary of raiding history ==
U-156 is credited with the sinking of 19 ships, for a total of 97,489 GRT, further damaging three ships of 18,811 GRT and damaging one warship, USS Blakeley, of 1,190 tons.

Date	Time	Name of Ship	Nationality	Tonnage (Note: Merchant ship tonnages are in gross register tons. Military vessels are listed by tons displacement.)	Fate and location
16 February 1942	08.01	Pedernales	United Kingdom	4,317	Damaged at 12°25′N 69°55′W
16 February 1942	08.03	Oranjestad	United Kingdom	2,396	Sunk at 12°25′N 69°55′W
16 February 1942	09.43	Arkansas	United States	6,452	Damaged at 12°30′N 70°00′W
20 February 1942	11.31	Delplata	United States	5,127	Sunk at 14°55′N 62°10′W
25 February 1942	02.19	La Carrière	United Kingdom	5,685	Sunk at 16°53′N 67°05′W
27 February 1942	10.35	Macgregor	United Kingdom	2,498	Sunk at 19°50′N 69°40′W
28 February 1942	11.17	Oregon	United States	7,017	Sunk at 20°44′N 67°52′W
13 May 1942	03.58	Koenjit	Netherlands	4,551	Sunk at 15°30′N 52°40′W
13 May 1942	22.05	City of Melbourne	United Kingdom	6,630	Sunk at 15°00′N 54°40′W
15 May 1942	02.54	Siljestad	Norway	4,301	Sunk at 15°20′N 52°40′W
15 May 1942	20.59	Kupa	Yugoslavia	4,382	Sunk at 14°50′N 52°20′W
17 May 1942	21.04	Barrdale	United Kingdom	5,072	Sunk at 15°15′N 52°27′W
18 May 1942	10.18	Quaker City	United States	4,961	Sunk at 15°47′N 53°12′W
18 May 1942	18.52	San Eliseo	United Kingdom	8,042	Damaged at 15°30′N 54°16′W
21 May 1942	18.29	Presidente Trujillo	Dominican Republic	1,668	Sunk at 14°38′N 61°11′W
25 May 1942	15.52	USS Blakeley	United States Navy	1,190	Damaged at 14°36′N 61°11′W
29 May 1942	01.03	Norman Prince	United Kingdom	1,913	Sunk at 14°40′N 62°15′W
1 June 1942	23.51	Alegrete	Brazil	5,970	Sunk at 13°40′N 61°30′W
3 June 1942	09.26	Lillian	United Kingdom	80	Sunk at 12°25′N 59°30′W
24 June 1942	08.10	Willimantic	United Kingdom	4,857	Sunk at 25°55′N 51°58′W
27 August 1942	01.00	Clan Macwhirter	United Kingdom	5,941	Sunk at 35°45′N 18°45′W
12 September 1942	22.07	RMS Laconia	United Kingdom	19,695	Sunk at 05°05′S 11°38′W
19 September 1942	15.46	Quebec City	United Kingdom	4,745	Sunk at 02°12′S 17°36′W

== Bibliography ==
- Busch, Rainer; Röll, Hans-Joachim (1999). German U-boat commanders of World War II : a biographical dictionary. Translated by Brooks, Geoffrey. London, Annapolis, Md: Greenhill Books, Naval Institute Press. ISBN 1-55750-186-6.
- Busch, Rainer; Röll, Hans-Joachim (1999). Deutsche U-Boot-Verluste von September 1939 bis Mai 1945 [German U-boat losses from September 1939 to May 1945]. Der U-Boot-Krieg (in German). Vol. IV. Hamburg, Berlin, Bonn: Mittler. ISBN 3-8132-0514-2.
- Gröner, Erich; Jung, Dieter; Maass, Martin (1991). U-boats and Mine Warfare Vessels. German Warships 1815–1945. Vol. 2. Translated by Thomas, Keith; Magowan, Rachel. London: Conway Maritime Press. ISBN 0-85177-593-4.
- Röll, Hans-Joachim (2011). Korvettenkapitän Werner Hartenstein: Mit U 156 auf Feindfahrt und der Fall "Laconia" (in German). Würzburg, Germany: Flechsig. ISBN 978-3-8035-0012-0.
