= SS City of Johannesburg =

British cargo steamship sunk during World War II

Coordinates: 33°20′S 29°30′E

History

United Kingdom
- Name: Melford Hall; City of Johannesburg
- Operator: Ellerman Lines Ltd, London
- Port of registry: (United Kingdom) Liverpool
- Builder: Barclay, Curle & Co, Whiteinch, Glasgow
- Yard number: 581
- Launched: 23 May 1920
- Completed: 1920, as the Melford Hall
- Identification: UK official number 143712
- Fate: Sunk on 23 October 1942

General characteristics
- Class & type: cargo steamship
- Tonnage: 5,669 GRT; tonnage under deck 5,394; 3,583 NRT
- Length: 417.2 ft (127.2 m)
- Beam: 54.8 ft (16.7 m)
- Depth: 29.0 ft (8.8 m)
- Propulsion: 2 steam turbines double-reduction geared onto a single shaft
- Crew: 89

SS City of Johannesburg was a British cargo steamship that was sunk in 1942. She was built by Barclay, Curle & Co, of Whiteinch, Glasgow in 1920, for Hall Lines of Liverpool, a subsidiary of Ellerman Lines, being launched as SS Melford Hall. She was renamed SS City of Johannesburg in 1926.

== Sinking ==
Her final voyage was to take her from Calcutta to the United Kingdom, calling at Colombo on 6 October 1942 and later at Cape Town on the way. She carried 7,750 tons of general cargo, including pig iron, cotton, jute and tea, under the command of her master, Walter Armour Owen.

At 2312 hours on 23 October she was travelling unescorted off East London South Africa, when she was sighted by German submarine U-504 commanded by Fritz Poske. The U-boat torpedoed the City of Johannesburg, and succeeded in sinking her. Two of the 89 crew were lost, but the master and 12 crew members were rescued by the Dutch cargo ship Zypenberg, which took them to Durban. Another 54 crew members were rescued by the British cargo ship Fort George and landed at Port Elizabeth, with the final 20 crew members being picked up by King Edwin, which took them to Cape Town.
