= SS Empire Chaucer =

World War II merchant ship of the United Kingdom

History
- Name: Empire Chaucer
- Owner: Ministry of War Transport
- Operator: W J Tatem Ltd
- Port of registry: (United Kingdom) Sunderland
- Builder: W Pickersgill & Sons Ltd
- Launched: 18 March 1942
- Completed: May 1942
- Out of service: 17 October 1942
- Identification: Code Letters BDVX; United Kingdom Official Number 169018
- Fate: Torpedoed and sunk 17 October 1942

General characteristics
- Tonnage: 5,970 GRT; 3,501 NRT
- Length: 401 ft 0 in (122.22 m)
- Beam: 54 ft 0 in (16.46 m)
- Depth: 33 ft 2 in (10.11 m)
- Installed power: Triple expansion steam engine
- Propulsion: Screw propeller
- Crew: 49

Location of the sinking of Empire Chaucer.

Empire Chaucer was a 5,970 GRT cargo ship which was built in 1942 by William Pickersgill & Sons Ltd, Sunderland. She was built for the Ministry of War Transport (MoWT). Completed in May 1942, she had a short career, being torpedoed and sunk by U-504 on 17 October 1942.

== Description ==
The ship was built by William Pickersgill & Sons Ltd, Sunderland. She was launched on 18 March 1942 and completed in May 1942.

The ship was 401 feet 0 inches (122.22 m) long, with a beam of 54 feet 0 inches (16.46 m) and a depth of 33 feet 2 inches (10.11 m). She had a GRT of 5,970 and a NRT of 3,501.

The ship was propelled by a triple expansion steam engine, which had cylinders of 23 1/2 inches (60 cm), 38 inches (97 cm) and 66 inches (170 cm) diameter by 45 inches (110 cm) stroke.

== History ==
Empire Chaucer was built for the MoWT. She was placed under the management of W J Tatem Ltd, Cardiff. Her port of registry was Sunderland. The Code Letters BDVX and United Kingdom Official Number 169018 were allocated.

In October 1942, Empire Chaucer departed Calcutta, India bound for the United Kingdom via Durban and Cape Town, South Africa and then via Trinidad. She was carrying a cargo of 2,000 tons of pig iron and 6,500 tons of general cargo, including mail and tea.

Empire Chaucer departed Durban on 13 October bound for Cape Town. At 06:15 on 17 October, Empire Chaucer was torpedoed and sunk 450 nautical miles (830 km) south of Cape Town (38°12′S 20°04′E) by U-504 with the loss of three crew. The remaining 46 crew and a passenger took to the lifeboats. Twelve survivors, including the Captain, were rescued by Empire Squire and landed at Trinidad. Fifteen survivors spent 23 days in a lifeboat before being rescued by Nebraska. They were landed at Cape Town. The remaining 20 survivors landed at Bredasdorp on 31 October. Those lost on Empire Chaucer are commemorated at the Tower Hill Memorial, London.
