= Orcades =

Orcades can refer to:

== Geography ==
- Orcades (islands), the ancient name of the Orkney Islands
- Orcades (Roman province), an apocryphal Roman province over Orkney

== Transportation ==
- SS Orcades (1921), a ship formerly named Prinz Ludwig (1906)
- SS Orcades (1936), a ship torpedoed and sunk during the Second World War
- SS Orcades (1947), a cruise ship in service until 1972
