= Ben Lomond (North Shore Mountains) =

Mountain in British Columbia, Canada

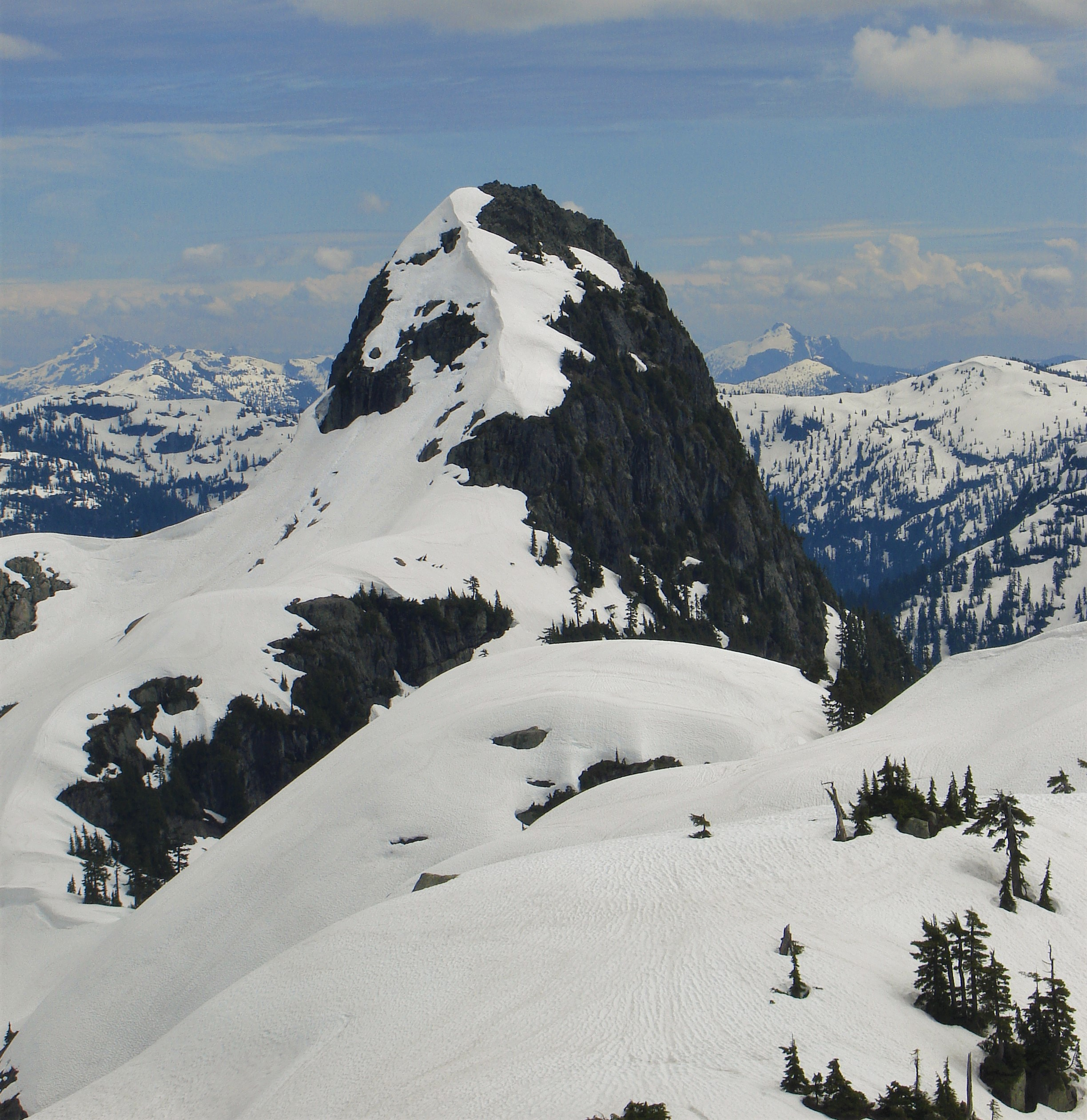
- West aspect

Highest point
- Elevation: 1,654 m (5,427 ft)
- Prominence: 189 m (620 ft)
- Listing: Mountains of British Columbia
- Coordinates: 49°35′51″N 123°03′01″W

Geography
- Location within British Columbia
- Interactive map of Ben Lomond
- Location: British Columbia, Canada
- District: New Westminster Land District
- Parent range: North Shore Mountains
- Topo map: NTS 92G11 Squamish

Climbing
- First ascent: 1908

Ben Lomond, formerly Ben Lomond Mountain, elevation 1,654 metres (5,427 ft), is a mountain in the North Shore Mountains of southwestern British Columbia, Canada. It is located southeast of the town of Squamish and immediately west of Loch Lomond and was named in association with that lake, both mountain and lake being named in reference to the mountain and lake of that name in Scotland.

== Climbing history ==
The first recorded ascent of Ben Lomond was in 1908 by F. Perry and W. J. Gray.

== Climate ==
Based on the Köppen climate classification, Ben Lomond is located in the marine west coast climate zone of western North America. Most weather fronts originate in the Pacific Ocean, and travel east toward the Coast Mountains where they are forced upward by the range (Orographic lift), causing them to drop their moisture in the form of rain or snowfall. As a result, the Coast Mountains experience high precipitation, especially during the winter months in the form of snowfall.

== See also ==
- Ben Lomond
- Ben Lomond (disambiguation)
