= SS Clan Macwhirter =

British cargo steamship sunk during World War II

Coordinates: 35°45′N 18°45′W

History

United Kingdom
- Name: Ypresville (1918); Halizones (1918–20); Willcasino (1920–23); Clan Macwhirter (1923–42)
- Owner: UK Shipping Controller (1918); British & S American SN Co (1918–20, 1921–24); Convoy SS Co Ltd (1920–21); Clan Line Steamers Ltd (1924–42)
- Operator: James Gardiner & Co (1918); RP Houston & Co (1918–20, 1921–24); HD Kempt (1920–21); Cayzer, Irvine & Co Ltd (1923–42)
- Port of registry: Glasgow
- Builder: Lloyd Royal Belge (Great Britain) Ltd, Whiteinch, Glasgow
- Launched: 26 April 1918
- Completed: July 1918
- Out of service: 27 August 1942
- Identification: UK official number 142598; code letters JVBM (1924–33); Call sign GDLY (1934–42)
- Fate: Sunk by torpedo

General characteristics
- Class & type: cargo steamship
- Tonnage: 5,941 GRT; tonnage under deck 5,509; 3,702 NRT
- Length: 424.4 feet (129.4 m)
- Beam: 55.8 feet (17.0 m)
- Draught: 26 feet 7 inches (8.10 m)
- Depth: 28.8 feet (8.8 m)
- Installed power: 549 NHP
- Propulsion: steam triple expansion engine
- Speed: 14 knots (26 km/h)
- Crew: 77, plus (in wartime) 9 DEMS gunners
- Armament: 1 × QF 4" gun; 5 × machine guns

SS Clan Macwhirter was a British cargo steamship. She was built in 1918 as Ypresville in the First World War and sunk by enemy action in 1942 in the Second World War. In her 24-year career she also carried the names Halizones and Willcasino.

== Building ==
Lloyd Royal Belge (Great Britain) Ltd built the ship at Whiteinch, Glasgow, launching her on 26 April 1918 as Ypresville. She was completed that July.

She had nine corrugated furnaces with a combined grate area of 186 square feet (17 m^{2}) that heated three 180 lb_{f}/in^{2} single-ended boilers with a combined heating surface of 8,151 square feet (757 m^{2}). They supplied steam to one three-cylinder steam triple expansion engine rated at 549 NHP.

== Peacetime career ==
Ypresville was built for the UK Government's Shipping Controller, a wartime agency that contracted James Gardiner and Company of Liverpool to manage her. By the end of 1918 the Shipping Controller had sold the ship to the British and South American Steam Navigation Company, which renamed her Halizones and contracted RP Houston and Company of Liverpool to manage her. In 1920 the Convoy Steam Ship Company Ltd of Halifax, Nova Scotia bought the ship, renamed her Willcasino and contracted HD Kempt of Liverpool to manage her. In 1921 Convoy SS Co sold the ship back to British and South American, who returned her to RP Houston's management but kept her name as Willcasino. In 1924 Clan Line Steamers Ltd bought the ship, renamed her Clan Macwhirter and appointed Cayzer, Irvine and Company Limited (who were part of the same group) to manage her.

== Wartime career ==
On 1 September 1939, the day that the UK and France declared war against Germany, Clan Macwhirter sailed unescorted from Majunga in Madagascar bound for Colombo in Ceylon. She continued to trade unescorted in the Indian Ocean and South Atlantic until 1 February 1940, when she reached Freetown in Sierra Leone with a cargo of wheat and maize from Rosario and Buenos Aires in Argentina. From Freetown she sailed on 5 February with Convoy SL 19F, reaching Liverpool on 20 February.

Macwhirter sailed in home waters, including with Convoy FN 102 from Southend to Methil, until she arrived off Southend on 15 March with Convoy FS 120. She left Southend on 5 April carrying general cargo with convoy OG 24, which reached Gibraltar on 8 November.

From Gibraltar Macwhirter sailed unescorted via Malta to Port Said and through the Suez Canal to Suez. She then traded in the Indian Ocean between ports in Ceylon, India and South Africa until she reached Cape Town on 30 July. On 31 July she sailed unescorted with general cargo, arriving at Freetown on 13 August. She left Freetown on 26 August with Convoy SL 45, which reached Liverpool on 15 September.

Macwhirter left Liverpool on 29 October with Convoy OB 236. After the convoy dispersed at sea as planned, she continued unescorted to Cape Town, Durban, Mombasa and Mauritius. On 17–18 February 1941 she called at Cape Town and on 3 March she reached Freetown again. On 13 March 1941 she left Freetown with Convoy SL 68, and when it dispersed at sea as planned she continued unescorted to Halifax, Nova Scotia.

Macwhirter loaded a cargo of sugar and iron and left Halifax on 10 April with Convoy HX 120, reaching Liverpool on 29 April. She then sailed independently to the Firth of Clyde and back to Liverpool. On 11 June she sailed from Liverpool with convoy OB 334 to Halifax, where she arrived on 26 June. From there she sailed unescorted to Trinidad, Cape Town, Durban, Lourenço Marques, Beira, Mauritius and back to Cape Town, where she arrived on 13 October.

Macwhirter left Cape Town on 16 October with a cargo of sugar for Britain. On 30 October she reached Freetown, where she left on 6 November with Convoy SL 92 to Liverpool. She then sailed in home waters with convoys WN 212, FS 667, FN 998, FN 612 and EN 43 until February 1942. On 6 February 1942 she left Methil with a general cargo, sailing with Convoy EN 43 which reached Oban on 8 February.

Macwhirter left Oban with a cargo of stores on 11 February, sailing with convoy OS 19 which reached Freetown on 3 March. She continued unescorted to Durban, and then sailed in the Indian Ocean to Karachi, Bombay, Durban, Lourenço Marques and Cape Town, where she arrived on 17 July. On 20 July she sailed independently to Bathurst, Gambia, where she arrived on 14 August.

=== Loss ===
Macwhirter left Bathurst on 16 August, sailing to Freetown where she joined Convoy SL 119. Her Master was Roderick Sutherland Masters and she was carrying 2,000 tons of manganese ore, 3,500 tons of linseed, 2,200 tons of pig iron and assorted general cargo. However, from 20 August she suffered engine trouble, eventually falling behind the convoy.

On 27 August at 0100 hours German submarine U-156, commanded by Werner Hartenstein, torpedoed Clan Macwhirter about 190 miles northwest of Madeira. Two torpedoes hit her port side, and 11 of her crew, including Captain Masters, eight crew members and two DEMS gunners were killed. Macwhirter listed to port, and her crew managed to launch three of her six boats before she sank in about 10 minutes.

The three boats remained in the area until daybreak, rescuing survivors who were in the water or clinging to floating wreckage. They then set sail for Madeira, but on 28 August a gale separated them. On 30 August second officer sent an emergency radio message. The Portuguese Navy responded by sending the aviso NRP Pedro Nunes, which rescued 67 crew members and seven gunners and landed them at Funchal.
