= SS Mendoza =

A number of steamships have been named Mendoza, including –

- SS Mendoza (1896), An Argentine cargo liner wrecked in 1914.
- SS Mendoza (1905), An Italian ocean liner in service 1905–14
- SS Mendoza (1919), A French passenger ship and British troopship in service 1919–43
- SS Mendoza (1920), A German cargo ship in service 1937–42
