= SS Benlomond =

A number of ships have been named SS Benlomond, after Ben Lomond, a mountain in Scotland. Seven were operated by the Ben Line, or its predecessors:

== Ships of Ben Line ==
- SS Benlomond was a cargo ship launched in 1890. She was renamed Asahi Maru in 1910, Mercator in 1920, and was scrapped in 1923.
- SS Benlomond was a cargo ship launched in 1911 and scrapped in 1932.
- SS Benlomond was a cargo ship launched in 1914 as Roman Prince. She was renamed Berwick Law in 1926, Benlomond in 1933 and Chrysopolis in 1935. She was wrecked in 1936.
- SS Benlomond was a cargo ship launched in 1922 as Cynthiana. She was renamed Hoosac later in 1922, London Corporation in 1923, Marionga J. Goulandris in 1937 and Benlomond in 1938, and was sunk by a German submarine in 1942.
- SS Benlomond was an Ocean-type cargo ship launched in 1942 as Ocean Valentine. She was renamed Benlomond in 1946, Yangos in 1956, and was scrapped in 1966.
- SS Benlomond was a cargo ship launched in 1957 and scrapped in 1977.
- MV Benlomond was a drillship built in 1975 as Fredericksburg, renamed Benlomond in 1981 and Deepsea Lomond in 1992.

== See also ==
- PS Benlomond was a wooden paddle steamer launched in 1825.
- Benlomond was a three-masted sailing ship launched in 1862, and later renamed Sophie Wilhelmine.
- SS Ben Lomond was a New Zealand steam ship launched in 1872.
- SS Ben Lomond was a cargo ship launched in 1906 and sunk by a German submarine in 1918.
- HMS Ben Lomond was an LST (3)-class tank landing ship of the Royal Navy.
