= German submarine U-68 =

U-68 may refer to one of the following German submarines:

- SM U-68, a Type U 66 submarine launched in 1915 and that served in the First World War until sunk 22 March 1916
  - During the First World War, Germany also had these submarines with similar names:
    - SM UB-68, a Type UB III submarine launched in 1917 and sunk on 4 October 1918
    - SM UC-68, a Type UC II submarine launched in 1916 and sunk on 17 March 1917
- German submarine U-68 (1940), a Type IXC submarine that served in the Second World War until sunk on 10 April 1944
