= List of shipwrecks in May 1942 =

The list of shipwrecks in May 1942 includes all ships sunk, foundered, grounded, or otherwise lost during May 1942.

== 1 May ==
List of shipwrecks: 1 May 1942
Ship	State	Description
Angarstroy	Soviet Union	World War II: The cargo ship was torpedoed and sunk in the Pacific Ocean 32 nautical miles (59 km) off the coast of Japan by USS Grenadier (United States Navy). All aboard, 46 crew and 14 passengers, were rescued by Kayo Maru (Japan).
Calcutta Maru	Imperial Japanese Army	World War II: The Somedono Maru-class transport ship (5,339 GRT) was torpedoed and sunk in the East China Sea (28°11′N 123°55′E) off Wenchow, China by USS Triton (United States Navy). Four crewmen and 50 passengers were killed. Survivors were rescued by Boko Maru and Kaisoku Maru (both Japan).
Edmond René	France	World War II: The fishing trawler (288 GRT) was sunk by a mine off San Sebastián, Spain. 12 of her 16 crew were lost.
James E. Newsom	Canada	World War II: The schooner (671 GRT) was shelled and sunk in the Atlantic Ocean 370 nautical miles (690 km) north east of Bermuda (35°50′N 59°40′W) by U-69 (Kriegsmarine). Her nine crew survived.
La Paz	United Kingdom	World War II: The cargo ship (6,548 GRT) was torpedoed and damaged off Cape Canaveral, Florida, United States (28°30′N 80°10′W) by U-109 (Kriegsmarine) and was beached. All 57 crewmen survived. She was repaired, and returned to service on 7 October 1942 as a ship of the United States Maritime Commission.
Mizuho	Imperial Japanese Navy	World War II: The seaplane tender (10,930 GRT) was torpedoed in the Pacific Ocean 40 miles (64 km) off Omae Zaki by USS Drum (United States Navy) before midnight. She sank in the early hours of 2 May. with the loss of 101 of her 574 crew. Survivors were rescued by Takao (Imperial Japanese Navy).
Parnahyba	Brazil	World War II: The cargo ship (6,692 GRT) was torpedoed, shelled and sunk in the Caribbean Sea off Trinidad (10°12′N 57°16′W) by U-162 (Kriegsmarine) with the loss of seven of her 72 crew. Survivors were rescued by Turret Cape (Canada).
HMS Punjabi	Royal Navy	World War II: The Tribal-class destroyer (1,891 GRT) was rammed and sunk in the Greenland Sea by HMS King George V (Royal Navy) with the loss of 49 of her 258 crew.
Tsiolkovsky	Soviet Union	World War II: Convoy QP 11: The cargo ship (2,847 GRT) was torpedoed and sunk by Z24 and Z25 (both Kriegsmarine) in the Barents Sea, 100 miles north of Kola Bay (71°46′N 34°30′E). Depending on sources there were between 27 and 33 dead, and 13 or 14 survivors. The names of 29 dead and 12 survivors are known. Some sources say that she was torpedoed and damaged some hours before by U-589 (Kriegsmarine) but it is not confirmed by British and Soviet reports.
U-573	Kriegsmarine	World War II: The Type VIIC submarine was depth charged and damaged in the Mediterranean Sea (approximately 37°N 1°E) by a Lockheed Hudson aircraft of 233 Squadron, Royal Air Force with the loss of one of her 44 crew. She put into Cartagena due to damage received and was interned. She was sold to the Spanish Navy in August 1942, serving until 1970 as G-7 and S-01.

== 2 May ==
List of shipwrecks: 2 May 1942
Ship	State	Description
Botavon	United Kingdom	World War II: Convoy PQ 15: The cargo ship was torpedoed by aircraft of 1 Staffeln, Kampfgeschwader 26, Luftwaffe whilst anchored at 73°02′N 19°46′E. She was on a voyage from Middlesbrough, Yorkshire, via Reykjavík, Iceland, to Murmansk, Soviet Union with government stores. Twenty-one of her 73 crew were killed. The wreck was sunk by a convoy escort the next day.
Calderon	United Kingdom	World War II: The cargo ship was bombed and sunk in the Mediterranean Sea (31°05′30″N 29°07′00″E) by Axis aircraft. Her crew survived.
Cape Corso	United Kingdom	World War II: Convoy PQ 15: The cargo ship was sunk in the Norwegian Sea (73°02′N 19°46′E) by Luftwaffe torpedo bomber aircraft whilst in a convoy to the Soviet Union. Of her complement of 56, only 6 survived.
USS Cythera	United States Navy	World War II: The naval yacht was torpedoed and sunk in the Atlantic Ocean 115 nautical miles (213 km) east of Cape Fear, North Carolina (33°15′N 75°26′W), by U-402 (Kriegsmarine) with the loss of 69 of her 71 crew. Survivors were taken on board U-402 as prisoners of war.
HMS Edinburgh	Royal Navy	World War II: Convoy QP 11: The Town-class cruiser was torpedoed and sunk in the Kola Inlet by the destroyer Z24 (Kriegsmarine) with the loss of 58 of her 750 crew. Survivors were rescued by HMS Gossamer and HMS Harrier (both Royal Navy).
ORP Jastrząb	Polish Navy	World War II: The S-class submarine was shelled and damaged in the Barents Sea by HMS Seagull (Royal Navy) and HNoMS St. Albans (Royal Norwegian Navy) with the loss of five crew. Once the error was realised, both ships rescued the survivors, and Jastrząb was scuttled by HMS Seagull at 71°30′N 12°32′E.
Jutland	United Kingdom	World War II: Convoy PQ 15: The cargo ship straggled behind the convoy. She was torpedoed and damaged in the Barents Sea by an aircraft of Kampfgeschwader 26, Luftwaffe with the loss of one of the 62 people on board. Survivors abandoned ship and were rescued by HMS Badsworth (Royal Navy). Jutland was torpedoed and sunk on 3 May at 73°02′N 19°46′E by U-251 (Kriegsmarine).
USS Mindanao	United States Navy	World War II: The gunboat was scuttled in Manila Bay, Philippines.
Otto Leonhardt	Germany	World War II: The cargo ship was torpedoed and damaged in the Mediterranean Sea off Sfax, Tunisia by HMS Proteus (Royal Navy). She was beached and did not see further service at sea.
RFA Sandar	Royal Fleet Auxiliary	World War II: The tanker was torpedoed and sunk in the Atlantic Ocean (11°42′N 61°10′W) by U-66 (Kriegsmarine) with the loss of three of her 37 crew. Survivors were rescued by Alcoa Pilot (United States). Sandar was on a voyage from Trinidad to Gibraltar.
U-74	Kriegsmarine	World War II: The Type VIIB submarine was depth charged and sunk in the Mediterranean Sea off Cartagena, Spain (37°16′N 00°01′E) by HMS Wishart and HMS Wrestler (both Royal Navy) with the loss of all 47 crew.
Uzan Maru	Japan	World War II: The cargo ship was torpedoed and sunk in the Pacific Ocean off the south east coast of Honshū (33°26′N 135°52′E) by USS Trout (United States Navy).
Z7 Hermann Schoemann	Kriegsmarine	World War II: The Type 1934A-class destroyer was shelled and damaged in the Barents Sea off Bear Island, Norway by HMS Edinburgh (Royal Navy) and was consequently scuttled by her crew. Most of her crew rescued by Z24, with 56 being rescued by U-88 (both Kriegsmarine).

== 3 May ==
List of shipwrecks: 3 May 1942
Ship	State	Description
British Workman	United Kingdom	World War II: Convoy ON 89: The tanker straggled behind the convoy. She was torpedoed and sunk in the Atlantic Ocean south east of Cape Race, Dominion of Newfoundland (44°07′N 51°53′W) by U-455 (Kriegsmarine) with the loss of six of her 53 crew. Survivors were rescued by HMCS Alberni and HMCS Assiniboine (both Royal Canadian Navy).
Col. George F. E. Harrison	United States Army	World War II: The Speedwell-class mine planter was bombed and damaged off Corregidor, Philippines. Four of her crew were killed. She was scuttled the next day in Mariveles Bay She was raised, repaired and put into Imperial Japanese Navy service as Harushima.
El Lago	United States	The tanker ran aground on Execution Rock in Long Island Sound. She received assistance from vessels of the Eastern Sea Frontier and was refloated at 02:15 on 4 May.
Konsul Karl Fisser	Germany	World War II: The cargo ship was bombed and sunk in the Norwegian Sea off Ålesund, Norway by aircraft of 608 Squadron, Royal Air Force. Her crew survived. She was refloated on 30 September 1957 and re-sunk in deeper water.
Laertes	Netherlands	World War II: The cargo ship was torpedoed and sunk in the Atlantic Ocean south east of Cape Canaveral, Florida, United States (28°21′N 80°23′W) by U-109 (Kriegsmarine) with the loss of eighteen of her 66 crew. Survivors either reached land in their lifeboat, or were rescued by a United States Navy aircraft. The wreck was partially demolished to provide 38 feet (12 m) of clearance.
Ocean Venus	United Kingdom	World War II: The Ocean ship was torpedoed and sunk in the Atlantic Ocean 12 nautical miles (22 km) east south east of Cape Canaveral (28°23′N 80°21′W) by U-564 (Kriegsmarine) with the loss of five of her 47 crew. The wreck was later partially demolished to provide 40 feet (12 m) of clearance.
Sama	Nicaragua	World War II: The cargo ship was torpedoed and sunk in the Atlantic Ocean (25°04′N 79°45′W) by U-506 (Kriegsmarine). Her fourteen crew were rescued by Athelregent (United Kingdom).
San Rafael	Dominican Republic	World War II: The cargo ship was torpedoed and sunk in the Caribbean Sea (18°36′N 79°12′W) by U-125 (Kriegsmarine) with the loss of one of her 38 crew.

== 4 May ==
List of shipwrecks: 4 May 1942
Ship	State	Description
Eastern Sword	United States	World War II: The cargo ship was torpedoed and sunk in the Atlantic Ocean 12 nautical miles (22 km; 14 mi) off the Georgetown Lighthouse, British Guiana (7°10′N 57°58′W) by U-162 (Kriegsmarine) with the loss of sixteen of her 29 crew. One survivor was rescued by the fishing vessel Ocean Star (British Guiana), the rest made land in their lifeboat.
Eclipse	United Kingdom	World War II: The tanker was torpedoed and sunk in the Atlantic Ocean off Fort Lauderdale, Florida, United States (26°30′N 80°00′W) by U-564 (Kriegsmarine) with the loss of two of her 47 crew. She was later salvaged and repaired. Eclipse returned to service in December 1942.
Empire Story	United Kingdom	The cargo ship ran aground on Briar Island, Nova Scotia, Canada, and was abandoned. She refloated herself and was later taken in tow by Foundation Franklin ( Canada) with the intention of taking her to Digby, Nova Scotia, but she capsized and sank at 44°35′N 66°19′W.
Florence M. Douglas	United Kingdom	World War II: The schooner was shelled and sunk in the Atlantic Ocean (7°55′N 58°10′W) by U-162 (Kriegsmarine). Her crew survived.
Herrenwyk	Germany	World War II: The cargo ship struck a mine and sank in the Bay of Kiel.
Kikuzuki	Imperial Japanese Navy	Kikuzuki World War II: Operation Mo: The Mutsuki-class destroyer was torpedoed in Tulagi Harbor, Solomon Islands by aircraft from USS Yorktown (United States Navy). Twelve of her 154 crew were killed, and 22 were wounded. Kikuzuki was beached on Florida Island to avoid sinking, but slid off the beach during the next high tide on 5 May and sank. Her wreck later was refloated and beached again by United States Army engineers.
Kinjosan Maru	Imperial Japanese Navy	World War II: The armed merchant cruiser was torpedoed and sunk in the Pacific Ocean (09°25′N 151°51′E) off Truk, South Seas Mandate by USS Greenling (United States Navy). On 7 May twenty-three survivors were rescued from a raft by Hokkai Maru (Imperial Japanese Navy). On 13 May three survivors were rescued by Yamasimo Maru (Imperial Japanese Navy).
Klaus Fritzen	Germany	World War II: The cargo ship was bombed and sunk at Måløy, Norway by aircraft of Coastal Command, Royal Air Force.
Kongosan Maru	Imperial Japanese Navy	World War II: The auxiliary gunboat was torpedoed and sunk in the Pacific Ocean south east of Honshū (33°32′N 136°05′E) by USS Trout (United States Navy).
Norlindo	United States	World War II: The Design 1074 ship was torpedoed and sunk in the Gulf of Mexico 80 nautical miles (150 km) north west of Dry Tortugas Island (24°57′N 84°00′W) by U-507 (Kriegsmarine) with the loss of five of her 28 crew. Survivors were rescued by San Blas (Panama).
USS Pigeon	United States Navy	World War II: The submarine rescue vessel, a former Lapwing-class minesweeper was bombed and sunk at Corregidor, Philippines, by a Japanese dive bomber.
Sizilien	Germany	World War II: The cargo ship was bombed and sunk in the North Sea off Borkum by aircraft of Coastal Command, Royal Air Force.
Tama Maru	Imperial Japanese Navy	World War II: Operation Mo: The auxiliary minesweeper was damaged in Purvis Bay, Florida Island, Solomon Islands, by aircraft from USS Yorktown (United States Navy), sinking on 6 May. Four of her crew were killed and seven were wounded. (Look 06/05/1942)
USS Tanager	United States Navy	World War II: The Lapwing-class minesweeper was sunk at Corregidor by Japanese shore-based artillery.
Tuscaloosa City	United States	World War II: The cargo ship was torpedoed and sunk in the Caribbean Sea 200 nautical miles (370 km) west of Negrit, Jamaica (18°25′N 81°31′W) by U-125 (Kriegsmarine). Her 34 crew were rescued by Falcon (United States).
Wa-1	Imperial Japanese Navy	World War II: Operation Mo: The Wa-1-class auxiliary minesweeper (215 t, 1942) was sunk in Purvis Bay, Florida Island, Solomon Islands, by aircraft from the aircraft carrier USS Yorktown (United States Navy).
Wa-2	Imperial Japanese Navy	World War II: Operation Mo: The Wa-1-class auxiliary minesweeper (215 t, 1942) was sunk in Purvis Bay, Florida Island, Solomon Islands by aircraft from the aircraft carrier USS Yorktown (United States Navy).
Wartenfels	Germany	World War II: The cargo ship was scuttled at Diégo-Suarez, Madagascar. She was later raised and repaired, and entered British service as Empire Tugela.
Four unnamed barges	Imperial Japanese Navy	World War II: Operation Mo: Four barges, probably landing barges, were sunk in Purvis Bay, Florida Island, Solomon Islands, by aircraft from USS Yorktown (United States Navy),

== 5 May ==
List of shipwrecks: 5 May 1942
Ship	State	Description
Afoundria	United States	World War II: The Design 1022 cargo ship was torpedoed and sunk in the Atlantic Ocean 8 nautical miles (15 km) north of the Le Male Lighthouse, Haiti (19°59′N 73°26′W). All 46 people on board were rescued by USS Mulberry (United States Navy).
HMS Auricula	Royal Navy	World War II: Battle of Madagascar: The Flower-class corvette struck a mine in the Indian Ocean off the northern tip of Madagascar. She was taken in tow by HMS Freesia (Royal Navy) but sank the next day. Her crew survived.
Bévéziers	Vichy France	World War II: Battle of Madagascar: The Agosta-class submarine was bombed and sunk in Currier Bay, Diego Suarez, Madagascar (12°16′S 49°17′E). Her crew lost two killed and one wounded in the sinking, and then took part in the land battle in the next days with the loss of five more killed and eight wounded.
Bougainville	Vichy France	World War II: Battle of Madagascar: The armed merchant cruiser was bombed and sunk at Diego Suarez by Royal Navy aircraft.
Delisle	United States	World War II: The cargo ship was torpedoed and damaged in the Atlantic Ocean 15 nautical miles (28 km) off the Jupiter Inlet, Florida (27°06′N 80°03′W) by U-564 (Kriegsmarine) with the loss of two of the 38 people on board. Survivors abandoned ship, but the crew reboarded her the next day and she was towed to Miami, Florida by a United States Navy tug. Delisle was later repaired and returned to service.
D'Entrecastreax	Vichy France	World War II: Battle of Madagascar: The Bougainville-class aviso was bombed and sunk in the Indian Ocean off Madagascar by aircraft from HMS Illustrious and gunfire from HMS Active and HMS Panther (all Royal Navy). She was raised, repaired and put into Free French service.
Fisheries II	United States Navy	World War II: The United States Navy-requisitioned patrol yacht was scuttled off Corregidor, Philippines.
USS Genesee	United States Navy	World War II: The fleet tug was scuttled off Corregidor Island, Philippines. She was subsequently salvaged by the Imperial Japanese Navy, repaired, and entered Japanese service as Patrol Boat No. 107.
John Adams	United States	World War II: The Liberty ship was torpedoed and sunk in the Pacific Ocean off the coast of New Caledonia (23°30′S 164°35′E) by I-21 (Imperial Japanese Navy) with the loss of five of her 50 crew. Thirteen of the survivors were rescued by USS Helm (United States Navy).
Joseph M. Cudahy	United States	World War II: The tanker was torpedoed and damaged in the Gulf of Mexico 125 nautical miles (232 km) west of Naples, Florida (25°57′N 83°57′W) by U-507 (Kriegsmarine) with the loss of 27 of her 37 crew. Survivors were rescued by Consolidated PBY Catalina aircraft of the United States Navy. The burned out hulk was scuttled by USS Coral (United States Navy) on 7 May as a hazard to navigation.
HMS LCM 46	Royal Navy	The landing craft mechanized capsized and sank in the East Indies.
Lady Drake	Canada	World War II: The passenger ship was torpedoed and sunk in the Atlantic Ocean 90 nautical miles (170 km) north of Bermuda (35°43′N 64°43′W) by U-106 (Kriegsmarine) with the loss of twelve of the 268 people aboard. Survivors were rescued by USS Owl (United States Navy).
Magnhild	Norway	The cargo ship ran aground on Virgin Rocks, Placentia Bay, Dominion of Newfoundland. Her twenty crew were rescued by USS Brant (United States Navy). Magnhild was declared a total loss on 23 May.
Maryann	USA c	World War II: The United States Navy-requisitioned converted yacht, neither commissioned nor assigned a hull number, was scuttled off Corregidor.
Munger T. Ball	United States	World War II: The tanker was torpedoed and sunk in the Gulf of Mexico 80 nautical miles (150 km) northwest of Dry Tortugas Island (25°17′N 83°57′W) by U-507 (Kriegsmarine) with the loss of 30 of her 34 crew. Survivors were rescued by Katy (Norway).
Perry	United States Navy	World War II: The United States Navy-requisitioned auxiliary patrol boat was scuttled off Corregidor.
Potemkin	Soviet Union	World War II: The cargo liner was sunk at Kamysh Buran by Luftwaffe aircraft with the loss of 30 of her crew. There were at least 25 survivors, all of whom were wounded.
Q-111 Luzon	Philippine Army	World War II: The enlarged Thornycroft 55-foot-class motor torpedo boat was scuttled in Manila Bay. She was raised by the Japanese in 1941, repaired and taken into Imperial Japanese Navy service as Gyoraitei 114
Sperrbercher 36 Eider	Kriegsmarine	World War II: The Sperrbrecher struck a mine and was severely damaged in the North Sea off Heligoland. She was consequently withdrawn from service.
Stanbank	United Kingdom	World War II: The cargo ship was torpedoed and sunk in the Atlantic Ocean (34°55′N 61°47′W) by U-103 (Kriegsmarine) with the loss of nine of her 48 crew. Survivors were rescued by Rhexenor (United Kingdom).
USS Vaga	United States Navy	World War II: The harbour tug was scuttled off Corregidor (14°25′N 120°30′E).
Zabern	Germany	World War II: The tanker struck a mine and sank in the Bay of Kiel.
Two unnamed ships	Flags unknown	World War II: Two "ships for channel cleaning" (dredgers?) were sunk in the Neretva Delta by partizans.

== 6 May ==
List of shipwrecks: 6 May 1942
Ship	State	Description
Abgara	Latvia	World War II: The cargo ship was torpedoed and sunk in the Atlantic Ocean south east of Great Inagua Island, Bahamas (20°45′N 72°55′W) by U-108 (Kriegsmarine). Her 34 crew reached land in her lifeboats. More: Latvian Mercantile Marine during World War II
Alcoa Puritan	United States	World War II: The Type C1-B cargo ship was torpedoed and sunk in the Gulf of Mexico 15 nautical miles (28 km) off the mouth of the Mississippi River (28°35′N 88°22′W) by the submarine U-507 (Kriegsmarine). All 54 people on board were rescued by the cutter USCGC Boutwell ( United States Coast Guard).
Amazone	Netherlands	World War II: The cargo ship was torpedoed and sunk in 13 fathoms (24 m) of water off Fort Pierce, Florida, United States (27°21′N 80°04′W) by U-333 (Kriegsmarine) with the loss of fourteen of her 25 crew. Survivors were rescued by USS PC-484 (United States Navy). Her wreck was demolished in 1944.
D'Entrecasteaux	French Navy	World War II: Operation Ironclad: The Bougainville-class aviso was badly damaged by Fleet Air Arm aircraft and was beached on the coast of Madagascar.
Empire Buffalo	United Kingdom	World War II: Convoy SC 71: The Design 1105 ship was torpedoed and sunk in the Caribbean Sea west of the Cayman Islands (19°14′N 82°34′W) by U-125 (Kriegsmarine) with the loss of thirteen of her 42 crew. Survivors were rescued by Caique (United States).
Green Island	United States	World War II: The cargo ship was torpedoed and sunk in the Caribbean Sea 80 nautical miles (150 km) south of Grand Cayman Island (18°25′N 81°30′W) by U-125 (Kriegsmarine). Her 22 crew were rescued by Fort Qu'Appelle (United Kingdom).
Halsey	United States	World War II: The tanker was torpedoed twice and sunk off St. Lucie Inlet (27°14′N 80°03′W) or (27°23′N 80°03′W) by U-333 (Kriegsmarine) in eight fathoms (48 ft; 15 m) of water with her two masts rising above water. Her 32 crew survived in two lifeboats. They were rescued by USS PC-451 (United States Navy) and towed to land by two fishing vessels.
Java Arrow	United States	World War II: The tanker was severely damaged by war causes. She was declared a constructive total loss. She was subsequently repaired and returned to service in 1943 as Kerry Patch.
Kanan Maru	Japan	World War II: The cargo ship was torpedoed and sunk in the South China Sea by USS Skipjack (United States Navy).
Laida	United States	World War II: The motor boat was sunk by Japanese forces 30 nautical miles (56 km; 35 mi) north east of Port Moller, Territory of Alaska (55°53′N 160°28′W).
USS Luzon	United States Navy	World War II: The Luzon-class gunboat was scuttled in Manila Bay off Corregidor, Philippines (14°23′N 120°35′E). She was salvaged by the Imperial Japanese Navy later that month, repaired, and entered service as Karatsu.
HMS ML 160	Royal Navy	World War II: The Fairmile B motor launch was bombed and sunk at Brixton, London.
USS Oahu	United States Navy	World War II: The Panay-class gunboat was sunk in Manila Bay off Corregidor (14°23′N 120°35′E) by Imperial Japanese Navy ships, or was scuttled.
USS Quail	United States Navy	World War II: The Lapwing-class minesweeper was scuttled at Corregidor (14°23′N 120°35′E).
HMT Senateur Duhamel	Royal Navy	World War II: The naval trawler sank in the Atlantic Ocean after colliding with USS Semmes (United States Navy) off Cape Lookout, North Carolina, United States.
Taiei Maru	Japan	World War II: Convoy No. 107: The cargo ship was torpedoed and sunk in the East China Sea (28°25′N 123°37′E) by USS Triton (United States Navy). Four of her 41 crew were killed.
Taigen Maru	Japan	World War II: Convoy No. 107: The cargo ship was torpedoed and sunk in the East China Sea (28°40′N 123°38′E) by USS Triton (United States Navy). Two passengers and 29 of her crew were killed.
Tama Maru	Imperial Japanese Navy	World War II: The auxiliary minesweeper was damaged in Purvis Bay, Florida Island, Solomon Islands, by United States Navy aircraft, sinking on 6 May. Four of her crew were killed and seven were wounded.
Vostok	Soviet Navy	World War II: The transport ship struck a mine and sank in the Black Sea at the entrance of the Kerch Strait. Ten of the 57 people aboard were killed. Survivors were rescued by her escort.

== 7 May ==
List of shipwrecks: 7 May 1942
Ship	State	Description
Chloe	Greece	World War II: The cargo ship was shelled and sunk in the Pacific Ocean 20 miles (32 km) west of Nouméa, New Caledonia (22°59′S 166°29′E) by I-21 (Imperial Japanese Navy). Her 35 crew survived.
Frank Seamans	Norway	World War II: The cargo ship was torpedoed and sunk in the Atlantic Ocean (6°21′N 55°38′W) by U-162 (Kriegsmarine). Her 27 crew were rescued by Koningin Emma (Netherlands).
Le Héros	Vichy France	World War II: Battle of Madagascar: The Redoutable-class submarine was depth-charged and sunk in the Indian Ocean off Diego-Suarez, Madagascar, by Fairey Swordfish aircraft of the Fleet Air Arm, based on Illustrious (Royal Navy). with the loss of 24 lives.
HMML 130	Royal Navy	World War II: The Fairmile B motor launch was sunk off Malta by gunfire from S 31, S 34 and S 61 (all Kriegsmarine). Four of her thirteen crew were killed. Survivors were captured by the German ships.
USS Neosho	United States Navy	World War II: Battle of the Coral Sea: The Cimarron-class oiler was bombed and damaged in the Coral Sea by Japanese aircraft. She was scuttled on 11 May by USS Henley (United States Navy) after rescuing survivors still aboard along with survivors of USS Sims (United States Navy) who were also aboard.
Ontario	Honduras	World War II: The cargo ship was torpedoed and sunk in the Gulf of Mexico (28°11′N 87°32′W) by U-507 (Kriegsmarine). Her 45 crew were rescued by USS Onyx (United States Navy).
Ruth	Sweden	World War II: The cargo ship was bombed and damaged off Den Helder, North Holland, Netherlands by aircraft of Coastal Command, Royal Air Force while carrying a cargo of coal. She was beached, but was declared a constructive total loss.
Shōhō	Imperial Japanese Navy	Shōhō World War II: Battle of the Coral Sea: The Zuihō-class aircraft carrier was bombed and sunk in the Coral Sea (16°07′14″S 151°54′47″E) by aircraft based on USS Lexington and USS Yorktown (both United States Navy) with the loss of 631 of her 833 crew. Survivors were rescued by Suzinami and Yūbari (both Imperial Japanese Navy).
USS Sims	United States Navy	World War II: Battle of the Coral Sea: The Sims-class destroyer was torpedoed and sunk in the Coral Sea by Japanese Aichi D3A Val aircraft with the loss of 177 of her 192 crew.

== 8 May ==
List of shipwrecks: 8 May 1942
Ship	State	Description
Bujun Maru	Japan	World War II: The cargo ship was torpedoed and sunk in the South China Sea by USS Skipjack (United States Navy).
Duca degli Abruzzi	Italy	World War II: The cargo ship was scuttled at Diégo Suarez, Madagascar.
USS Lexington	United States Navy	World War II: Battle of the Coral Sea: The Lexington-class aircraft carrier was scuttled in the Coral Sea (15°20′S 155°30′E) by USS Phelps (United States Navy) following battle damage. Around 300 of her 2,122 crew were killed. The wreck was discovered in March 2018.
Mildred Pauline	Canada	World War II: The schooner was shelled and sunk in the Atlantic Ocean off the coast of Nova Scotia by U-136 (Kriegsmarine) with the loss of all seven crew.
Monge	Vichy France	World War II: Battle of Madagascar: The Redoutable-class submarine was sunk in the Indian Ocean off the coast of Madagascar by HMS Active and HMS Panther (both Royal Navy) with the loss of all 69 hands.
Ohioan	United States	World War II: The Design 1015 ship was torpedoed and sunk in the Atlantic Ocean 10 nautical miles (19 km) off Boynton Beach, Florida (26°31′N 79°59′W) in 92 fathoms (552 ft; 168 m) of water by U-564 (Kriegsmarine) with the loss of fifteen of her 37 crew. Survivors were rescued by United States Coast Guard ships.
HMS Olympus	Royal Navy	World War II: The Odin-class submarine struck a mine and sank in the Mediterranean Sea off Malta (35°55′N 14°35′E) with the loss of 89 of the 98 people on board.
Somalia	Italy	World War II: The cargo ship was scuttled at Diégo Suarez. The wreck was later raised and scrapped.
Taiyo Maru	Imperial Japanese Army	World War II: Convoy No. 109: The Taiyo Maru-class transport ship was torpedoed by USS Grenadier (United States Navy), setting her afire and igniting her cargo of calcium carbide, in turn detonating hand grenades and illumination rounds in her cargo. She sank in the Pacific Ocean 170 km (92 nmi) southwest of Me Shima, Nannyo Gunto, Kyushu. A total of 656 passengers, 156 crew and 4 gunners were killed. Fifteen survivors were rescued by Peking Maru, 480 by Minekaze and Tomitsu Maru, (all Imperial Japanese Navy). Another 48 were rescued by the fishing vessel Genshin Maru No. 1 (Japan) on 10 May.
Torny	Norway	World War II: The cargo ship was torpedoed and sunk in the Gulf of Mexico (26°45′N 86°40′W) by U-507 (Kriegsmarine) with the loss of two of her 26 crew. Survivors were rescued by two United States Navy aircraft.

== 9 May ==
List of shipwrecks: 9 May 1942
Ship	State	Description
Calgarolite	Canada	World War II: The tanker was torpedoed, shelled and sunk in the Caribbean Sea 50 nautical miles (93 km) south west of Grand Cayman Island (19°24′N 82°30′W) by U-125 (Kriegsmarine). Her 45 crew survived.
Douro	Norway	World War II: The cargo ship was bombed and sunk in the Atlantic Ocean (60°41′N 12°58′W) by Luftwaffe aircraft with the loss of ten of her 20 crew. Survivors were rescued by the fishing trawler Gyllir ( Iceland).
Lise	Norway	World War II: The tanker was torpedoed, shelled and sunk in the Atlantic Ocean (13°53′N 68°20′W) by U-69 (Kriegsmarine) with the loss of twelve of her 33 crew. Some of the survivors were rescued by HNLMS Femern (Royal Netherlands Navy) and Socrates (Netherlands), others reached land in their lifeboat.
Lubrafol	Panama	Lubrafol sinking World War II: The tanker was torpedoed and set afire in the Atlantic Ocean 3 nautical miles (5.6 km) off Delray Beach, Florida, United States (26°26′N 80°00′W) by U-564 (Kriegsmarine) with the loss of thirteen of her 44 crew. Survivors were rescued by the United States Coast Guard. The burning Lubrafol drifted until 11 May when she finally sank at 26°41′N 80°01′W or 29°14′N 80°10′W. The wreck was broken up for scrap in 1954.
M-533	Kriegsmarine	The Type 1916 minesweeper was sunk in a collision with R-45 (Kriegsmarine) north west of Boulogne, Pas de Calais, France.
Mont Louis	Canada	World War II: The cargo ship was torpedoed and sunk in the Atlantic Ocean south of Trinidad (8°23′N 58°44′W) by U-162 (Kriegsmarine) with the loss of thirteen of her 21 crew. Survivors were rescued by Mona Marie ( Canada).
R-45	Kriegsmarine	The Type R-41 minesweeper was sunk in a collision with Raule (Kriegsmarine) off Dunkerque, Nord, France.
U-352	Kriegsmarine	World War II: The Type VIIC submarine was depth charged and sunk in the Atlantic Ocean south of Morehead City, North Carolina, United States (34°21′N 76°35′W) by USCGC Icarus ( United States Coast Guard) with the loss of fifteen of her 48 crew.

== 10 May ==
List of shipwrecks: 10 May 1942
Ship	State	Description
Aurora	United States	World War II: The tanker was torpedoed and damaged in the Gulf of Mexico 40 nautical miles (74 km) off the Southwest Pass, Louisiana (28°35′N 90°00′W) by U-506 (Kriegsmarine) with the loss of one of her 50 crew. Survivors abandoned ship, and were rescued by USS Onyx and USS YP-157 (both United States Navy). Aurora was taken in tow by Robert W. Wilmot (United States) and USS Tuckahoe (United States Navy) but ran aground at the entrance to the Mississippi River. She was refloated and taken to Algiers, Louisiana, where she was declared a total loss. She was subsequently repaired, and returned to service in 1943 as Jamestown.
Chernomorets	Soviet Union	World War II: The transport ship was bombed and sunk in the Black Sea by Luftwaffe aircraft with the loss of 500 lives. She was on a voyage from Kerch to Novorossiysk.
Clan Skene	United Kingdom	World War II: The cargo ship was torpedoed and sunk in the Atlantic Ocean (31°43′N 70°43′W) by U-333 (Kriegsmarine) with the loss of nine of her 82 crew. Survivors were rescued by USS McKean (United States Navy).
Kitty's Brook	United Kingdom	World War II: The cargo ship was torpedoed and sunk in the Atlantic Ocean 35 nautical miles (65 km) south east of Cape Sable, Nova Scotia, Canada (42°56′N 63°59′W) by U-588 (Kriegsmarine) with the loss of nine of her 34 crew.
Oridono Maru	Japan	World War II: The cargo ship struck a mine and sank in the South China Sea (7°00′S 112°40′E).
HMHS Ramb IV	Royal Navy	World War II: The hospital ship was bombed and set afire off Alexandria, Egypt by Junkers Ju 88 aircraft of Lehrgeschwader I1, Luftwaffe. Of the 360 wounded and staff aboard, 155 wounded and 10 of her crew were lost. The ship was scuttled by Royal Navy ships at 31°17′N 29°23′E.
S 31	Kriegsmarine	World War II: The Type 1939 Schnellboot was sunk by a mine off Malta. Eight of her crew were killed and another died of wounds. Survivors were rescued by S 61 (Kriegsmarine).
Warmia	Kriegsmarine	World War II: The replenishment oiler struck a mine in the Bay of Biscay and was severely damaged.

== 11 May ==
List of shipwrecks: 11 May 1942
Ship	State	Description
Anakriya	Soviet Navy	World War II: The barge was bombed and sunk in the Black Sea by Luftwaffe aircraft while evacuating wounded from Crimea.
HMT Bedfordshire	Royal Navy	World War II: The naval trawler was torpedoed and sunk in the Atlantic Ocean off Cape Lookout, North Carolina, United States (34°10′N 76°41′W) by U-558 (Kriegsmarine) with the loss of all 37 crew.
C 308	United Kingdom	World War II: The tug was bombed and sunk at Malta by Luftwaffe aircraft. Ten of her crew were killed.
Cape of Good Hope	United Kingdom	World War II: The cargo ship (4,963 GRT) was sunk by torpedo and shellfire in the Atlantic Ocean north east of the Virgin Islands (22°48′N 58°43′W) by U-502 (Kriegsmarine). Her 37 crew all survived.
Empire Dell	United Kingdom	World War II: Convoy ON 92: The CAM ship was torpedoed and sunk in the Atlantic Ocean (53°00′N 29°57′W) by U-124 (Kriegsmarine) with the loss of two of her 48 crew.
HMS Jackal	Royal Navy	World War II: The J-class destroyer was bombed and damaged in the Mediterranean Sea north west of Mersa Matruh, Egypt by Junkers Ju 88 aircraft of I Staffeln, Lehrgeschwader 1, Luftwaffe, with the loss of 77 of her crew. She was subsequently scuttled the next day by HMS Jervis (Royal Navy).
HMS Kipling	Royal Navy	World War II: The K-class destroyer was bombed and sunk in the Mediterranean Sea north west of Mersa Matruh by Junkers Ju 88 aircraft of I Staffeln, Lehrgeschwader 1, Luftwaffe.
HMS Lively	Royal Navy	World War II: The L-class destroyer was bombed and sunk in the Mediterranean Sea 100 nautical miles (190 km) north east of Tobruk, Libya by Junkers Ju 88 aircraft of Lehrgeschwader 1, Luftwaffe, with the loss of 77 of her 221 crew.
Rion	Soviet Navy	World War II: The gunboat was bombed and sunk in the Black Sea by Luftwaffe aircraft while evacuating wounded from Crimea.

== 12 May ==
List of shipwrecks: 12 May 1942
Ship	State	Description
Berezan	Soviet Union	World War II: The auxiliary sailing ship was sunk at Kerch by Luftwaffe aircraft, or by mines.
Brilliant	Soviet Navy	World War II: The Zemchug-class patrol vessel was bombed and sunk by Luftwaffe aircraft at Iokanga. She was raised on 25 September 1942, repaired, and recommissioned in June 1944.
Cocle	Panama	World War II: Convoy ON 92: The cargo ship was torpedoed and sunk in the Atlantic Ocean (52°37′N 29°13′W) by U-94 (Kriegsmarine) with the loss of five of her 42 crew. Survivors were rescued by Bury (United Kingdom).
Cristales	United Kingdom	World War II: Convoy ON 92: The cargo ship was torpedoed and damaged in the Atlantic Ocean (52°55′N 29°50′W) and was abandoned by her 82 crew. They were rescued by USCGC Spencer ( United States Coast Guard) and HMCS Shediac (Royal Canadian Navy). Cristales was scuttled by the latter ship.
K-23	Soviet Navy	World War II: The K-class submarine was sunk in the Barents Sea off Nordkyn, Norway by the auxiliary warships UJ 1101, UJ 1108 and UJ 1110 (all Kriegsmarine). All 71 men aboard were killed.
Krasny Flot	Soviet Union	World War II: The transport ship was bombed and sunk at Yeni-Kale by Luftwaffe aircraft. There were no casualties.
Krasny Moryak	Soviet Union	World War II: The transport ship was bombed and sunk at Temryuk by Luftwaffe aircraft. Four of her crew were killed.
Leto	Netherlands	World War II: The cargo ship was torpedoed and sunk in the Atlantic Ocean 8 nautical miles (15 km) north of Cap-de-la-Madeleine, Quebec, Canada (49°32′N 65°19′W) by U-553 (Kriegsmarine) with the loss of twelve of the 53 people on board, including one or two of the four officer survivors from Oscilla (Netherlands).
SS Llanover (1928)	United Kingdom	World War II: Convoy ON 92: The cargo ship was torpedoed and damaged in the Atlantic Ocean (52°50′N 29°04′W) by U-124 (Kriegsmarine). Her 46 crew were rescued by Bury (United Kingdom). Llanover was scuttled by HMCS Arvida (Royal Canadian Navy).
Mount Parnes	Greece	World War II: Convoy ON 92: The cargo ship was torpedoed and damaged in the Atlantic Ocean (52°31′N 29°20′W) by U-124 (Kriegsmarine). She was later scuttled by one of the convoy escorts. Her 33 crew survived.
Nicoya	United Kingdom	World War II: The cargo ship was torpedoed and sunk in the Gulf of St. Lawrence south of Anticosti Island, Quebec, Canada (49°19′N 64°15′W) by U-553 (Kriegsmarine) with the loss of six of the 88 people on board.
Okinoshima	Imperial Japanese Navy	World War II: The minelayer was torpedoed and damaged in the Bismarck Sea southwest of Buka Island by USS S-42 (United States Navy). She sank under tow in the St. George Channel off of New Ireland, Papua New Guinea (05°06′S 153°48′E).
PK-083	Soviet Navy	World War II: The patrol boat was bombed and sunk at Kerch by Luftwaffe aircraft.
Sansei Maru	Imperial Japanese Navy	The Sansei Maru-class auxiliary transport ran aground off Peleliu. She was refloated on 13 August 1942.
Shoei Maru	Imperial Japanese Navy	World War II: The salvage ship was torpedoed and sunk in the Bismarck Sea (04°51′S 152°15′E) six nautical miles (11 km; 6.9 mi) northeast of Cape St. George, New Ireland, by USS S-44 (United States Navy) while on its way to assist Okinoshima (Imperial Japanese Navy). Her commanding officer was killed.
SKA-0133	Soviet Navy	World War II: The patrol boat was bombed and sunk at Kerch by Luftwaffe aircraft.
SKA-0183	Soviet Navy	World War II: The patrol boat was bombed and sunk at Kerch by Luftwaffe aircraft.
SKA-0411	Soviet Navy	World War II: The patrol boat was bombed and sunk at Kerch by Luftwaffe aircraft.
SKA-0611	Soviet Navy	World War II: The patrol boat was bombed and sunk at Kerch by Luftwaffe aircraft.
SKA-0811	Soviet Navy	World War II: The patrol boat was bombed and sunk at Kerch by Luftwaffe aircraft.
Virginia	United States	World War II: The tanker was torpedoed and sunk in the Gulf of Mexico (28°53′N 89°29′W) by U-507 (Kriegsmarine) with the loss of 27 of her 41 crew. Survivors were rescued by USS PT-157 (United States Navy).

== 13 May ==
List of shipwrecks: 13 May 1942
Ship	State	Description
Batna	United Kingdom	World War II: Convoy ON 92: The cargo ship was torpedoed and sunk in the Atlantic Ocean (52°09′N 33°56′W) by U-94 (Kriegsmarine) with the loss of one of her 42 crew. Survivors were rescued by Bury (United Kingdom).
Brabant	Belgium	World War II: The cargo ship (2,483 GRT) was torpedoed and sunk in the Caribbean Sea (11°32′N 62°43′W) by U-155 (Kriegsmarine) with the loss of 21 of the 33 people on board (16 crew, 3 gunners and 2 passengers).
City of Melbourne	United Kingdom	World War II: The cargo ship was torpedoed and sunk in the Atlantic Ocean west of Barbados (15°00′N 54°40′W) by U-156 (Kriegsmarine) with the loss of one of her 87 crew.
Denpark	United Kingdom	World War II: Convoy SL 109: The cargo ship was torpedoed and sunk in the Atlantic Ocean (22°28′N 28°10′W) by U-128 (Kriegsmarine) with the loss of 21 of her 46 crew. Survivors were rescued by City of Windsor (United Kingdom).
Esso Houston	United States	World War II: The tanker was torpedoed and sunk in the Atlantic Ocean 150 nautical miles (280 km) east of Barbados (12°12′N 57°25′W) by U-162 (Kriegsmarine) with the loss of one of her 42 crew. Survivors were rescued by Havprins (Norway) or reached land in their lifeboats.
Gulfpenn	United States	World War II: The tanker was torpedoed and sunk in the Gulf of Mexico (28°29′N 89°12′W) by U-506 (Kriegsmarine) with the loss of thirteen of her 38 crew. Survivors were rescued by Telde (Honduras).
Hav	Norway	World War II: The cargo ship struck a mine and was damaged in the Mediterranean Sea off Port Said, Egypt with the loss of two of her 38 crew. She was taken in tow and beached (31°17′57″N 32°21′09″E) but was declared a constructive total loss.
Iltis	Kriegsmarine	World War II: The torpedo boat was torpedoed and sunk off Boulogne, Pas-de-Calais, France (50°46′N 01°34′E) by HM MTB 219 and HM MTB 221 (both Royal Navy) with the loss of 118 of her crew.
Koenjit	Netherlands	World War II: The cargo ship was torpedoed and sunk in the Atlantic Ocean 300 nautical miles (560 km) north north east of Barbados (15°30′N 52°40′W) by U-156 (Kriegsmarine). Her 37 crew survived.
Letitia Porter	Netherlands	World War II: The motor launch was being carried as deck cargo on board Koenjit (Netherlands) and was lost when that ship was torpedoed and sunk by U-156 (Kriegsmarine).
HM MTB 220	Royal Navy	World War II: The Vosper 70'-class motor torpedo boat was sunk by gunfire from a Kriegsmarine Schnellboot.
Nagasaki Maru	Japan	World War II: The ocean liner struck a mine and sank in the Pacific Ocean off Nagasaki with the loss of 39 lives. Her captain later committed hara-kiri.
Norlantic	United States	World War II: The Design 1099 ship was torpedoed and sunk in the Atlantic Ocean (12°13′N 66°30′W by U-69 (Kriegsmarine) with the loss of seven of her 29 crew. Survivors were rescued by India, Mississippi (both Netherlands), Marpesia (Norway) and the tug Crusader Kingston (Flag unknown).
Seeadler	Kriegsmarine	World War II: The torpedo boat was torpedoed and sunk off Boulogne(50°46′N 01°34′E) by HM MTB 219 and HM MTB 221 (both Royal Navy) with the loss of 85 of her crew.
Shonan Maru	Japan	World War II: The cargo ship was torpedoed and sunk in the Pacific Ocean by USS Drum (United States Navy).
Tolken	Sweden	World War II: Convoy ON 92: The cargo ship was torpedoed and sunk in the Atlantic Ocean 675 nautical miles (1,250 km) south east of Cape Farewell, Greenland (51°50′N 33°35′W) by U-94 (Kriegsmarine). Her 34 crew were rescued by Bury (United Kingdom).

== 14 May ==
List of shipwrecks: 14 May 1942
Ship	State	Description
British Colony	United Kingdom	World War II: The tanker was torpedoed and sunk in the Atlantic Ocean 90 nautical miles (170 km) north east of Bridgetown, Barbados (13°12′N 58°10′W) by U-162 (Kriegsmarine) with the loss of four of her 47 crew.
Comayagua	Honduras	World War II: The cargo ship was torpedoed and sunk in the Caribbean Sea 14 nautical miles (26 km) south west of Grand Cayman Island (19°00′N 81°37′W) by U-125 (Kriegsmarine) with the loss of seven of her 42 crew. Survivors were rescued by Cimboco (United Kingdom).
David McKelvy	United States	World War II: The tanker was torpedoed and damaged in the Gulf of Mexico 35 nautical miles (65 km) south of the mouth of the Mississippi River (28°30′N 89°55′W) by U-506 (Kriegsmarine) with the loss ofseventeen of her 42 crew. Survivors abandoned ship and were rescued by USCGC Boutwell ( United States Coast Guard) and Norsol (Norway). David McKelvy was beached on the Louisiana coast where she was declared a total loss.
Dzerzhinsky	Soviet Navy	World War II: The Fidonisy-class destroyer was sunk by a mine off Sevastopol with the loss of 260 of her crew.
Isbjørn	Norway	World War II: Operation Fritham: The icebreaker was bombed and sunk in Isfjord, Svalbard by Focke-Wulf Fw 200 Condor aircraft of the Luftwaffe with the loss of seventeen of her 21 crew.
Mount Olympus	Greece	World War II: The cargo ship struck a mine and sank in the Mediterranean Sea off Port Said, Egypt (31°21′N 32°21′E) with the loss of three of her 30 crew.
M 1307 Neufisch I	Kriegsmarine	World War II: The minesweeper struck a mine and sank off Esbjerg, Denmark (55°26′N 08°15′E) with the loss of eight lives.
Potrero del Llano	Mexico	World War II: The tanker was torpedoed and sunk in the Atlantic Ocean off Cape Florida, Florida, United States (25°35′N 80°06′W) by U-564 (Kriegsmarine) with the loss of thirteen of her 35 crew.
San Giusto	Italy	World War II: The schooner was sunk in the Mediterranean Sea by HMS Turbulent (Royal Navy). There was one person reported missing and eleven survivors.
Selis	Norway	World War II: Operation Fritham: The seal catcher was bombed and sunk in Isfjord by Focke-Wulf Fw 200 Condor aircraft of the Luftwaffe with the loss of twelve of the 82 people aboard.
HMS Trinidad	Royal Navy	World War II: Convoy PQ 13: The Crown Colony-class cruiser was bombed and damaged in the Arctic Ocean by Junkers Ju 88 aircraft of the Luftwaffe with the loss of 69 lives, including some survivors of ships sunk previously. She was scuttled the next day by HMS Matchless (Royal Navy).

== 15 May ==
List of shipwrecks: 15 May 1942
Ship	State	Description
Amapala	Honduras	World War II: The cargo ship (4,148 GRT) was torpedoed and damaged in the Gulf of Mexico (26°40′N 88°17′W) by U-507 (Kriegsmarine) with the loss of one of her 57 crew. Survivors were rescued by the fishing schooner Gonzalez (United States) and a United States Navy aircraft. Amapala was taken in tow by USCGC Boutwell ( United States Coast Guard) but foundered on 16 May at 26°30′N 89°12′W.
Kupa	Yugoslavia	World War II: The cargo ship was torpedoed and sunk in the Atlantic Ocean (14°50′N 52°20′W) by U-156 (Kriegsmarine) with the loss of two of her 70 crew.
M 26	Kriegsmarine	World War II: The minesweeper was bombed and sunk off Cap de La Hague, Manche, France by Royal Air Force aircraft.
M 256	Kriegsmarine	World War II: the minesweeper was bombed and severely damaged off Cap de la Hogue by Royal Air Force aircraft. She later sank off Cherbourg, Seine-Inférieure. She was raised, repaired and returned to service.
Selje	Germany	World War II: The cargo ship (6,998 GRT) was bombed and sunk in the North Sea north of Terschelling, Friesland, Netherlands by Lockheed Hudson aircraft of 320 and 407 Squadrons, Royal Air Force with the loss of 15 Norwegian sailors.
Siljestad	Norway	World War II: The cargo ship was torpedoed and sunk in the Atlantic Ocean north-east of Barbados (15°20′N 52°40′W) by U-156 (Kriegsmarine) with the loss of two of her 33 crew.
Soudan	United Kingdom	World War II: Convoy WS 15: The cargo ship struck a mine and sank in the Atlantic Ocean off Cape Agulhas, Union of South Africa (36°10′S 20°22′E. One of her 101 crew was killed.
Toyohara Maru	Japan	World War II: The cargo ship was torpedoed and sunk in the Pacific Ocean off the coast of Honshū by USS Tuna (United States Navy). Twenty-one of her crew were killed.
V 2002 Madeleine Louise	Kriegsmarine	World War II: The vorpostenboot was bombed and sunk in the North Sea off Terschelling by Lockheed Hudson aircraft of 407 Squadron, Royal Air Force.

== 16 May ==
List of shipwrecks: 16 May 1942
Ship	State	Description
Goyo Maru	Imperial Japanese Navy	World War II: The Goyo Maru-class auxiliary transport was torpedoed and damaged by USS Tautog (United States Navy) south of Truk, South Seas Mandate. She was beached on the Royalist Reef to prevent sinking. She was later refloated and taken to Truk.
MTB 338	Royal Navy	The BPB 60'-class motor torpedo boat exploded and burned at Trinidad.
Nicarao	United States	World War II: The cargo ship was torpedoed and sunk in the Atlantic Ocean north of the Bahamas (25°20′N 74°19′W) by U-751 (Kriegsmarine) with the loss of eight of her 39 crew. Survivors were rescued by Esso Augusta (United States).
William C. McTarnahan	United States	World War II: The tanker was torpedoed, shelled and damaged in the Gulf of Mexico 35 nautical miles (65 km) east of the Ship Shoal Lighthouse, Louisiana (28°52′N 90°20′W) by U-506 (Kriegsmarine) with the loss of eighteen of her 45 crew. Survivors abandoned ship and were rescued by the shrimpers Defender, Pioneer and Viscali (all United States). William C. McTarnahan was taken in tow by Baranca (United States) and USS Tuckahoe ( United States Coast Guard). She was subsequently repaired and returned to service in 1943 as St. James.

== 17 May ==
List of shipwrecks: 17 May 1942
Ship	State	Description
Barrdale	United Kingdom	World War II: The cargo ship was torpedoed and sunk in the Atlantic Ocean (15°15′N 52°27′W) by U-156 (Kriegsmarine) with the loss of one of her 53 crew. The 52 survivors were rescued by Rio Iguazu (Argentina) and landed at Recife, Brazil.
RFA Beth	Royal Fleet Auxiliary	World War II: The tanker was torpedoed and sunk in the Caribbean Sea 135 nautical miles (250 km) east south east of Barbados (11°48′N 57°32′W) by U-162 (Kriegsmarine) with the loss of one of her 31 crew.
Challenger	United States	World War II: The cargo ship was torpedoed and sunk in the Caribbean Sea (12°11′N 61°18′W) by U-155 (Kriegsmarine) with the loss of eight of the 64 people on board. Survivors were rescued by USS Turquoise (United States Navy).
Foam	United States	World War II: The fishing trawler was shelled and sunk in the Atlantic Ocean 85 nautical miles (157 km) south of Halifax, Nova Scotia, Canada (43°20′N 63°08′W) by U-432 (Kriegsmarine) with the loss of one of her 21 crew. Survivors either reached the Sambro Lightship ( Canada) in their lifeboats or were rescued by HMCS Halifax (Royal Canadian Navy).
Fort Qu'Apelle	United Kingdom	World War II: The Fort ship was torpedoed and sunk in the Atlantic Ocean (59°50′N 63°30′W) by U-135 (Kriegsmarine) with the loss of thirteen of her 47 crew. Survivors were rescued by HMCS Melville (Royal Canadian Navy).
Gulfoil	United States	World War II: The tanker was torpedoed and sunk in the Gulf of Mexico 75 nautical miles (139 km) south west of the mouth of the Mississippi River (28°08′N 89°46′W) by U-506 (Kriegsmarine) with the loss of 21 of her 40 crew. Survivors were rescued by Benjamin Brewster (United States).
I-28	Imperial Japanese Navy	World War II: The Type B1 submarine was torpedoed and sunk in the Pacific Ocean 2 miles (3.2 km) west of the Royalist Reef, Truk, South Pacific Mandate (06°30′N 152°00′E) by USS Tautog (United States Navy) with the loss of all 88 crew.
I-64	Imperial Japanese Navy	World War II: The Kaidai IV-class submarine was torpedoed and sunk in the Pacific Ocean south south east of Cape Ashizuri, Kyūshū (29°25′N 134°9′E) by USS Triton (United States Navy) with the loss of all 81 hands.
Peisander	United Kingdom	World War II: The cargo ship was torpedoed and sunk in the Atlantic Ocean 350 nautical miles (650 km) off Nantucket Island, Massachusetts, United States (37°24′N 65°38′W) by U-653 (Kriegsmarine). Her 65 crew were rescued by USCGC General Greene ( United States Coast Guard).
Ruth Lykes	United States	World War II: The cargo ship was torpedoed, shelled and sunk in the Caribbean Sea (16°37′N 82°27′W) by U-103 (Kriegsmarine) with the loss of six of the 36 people on board. Survivors were rescued by Somerville (Norway).
S 34	Kriegsmarine	World War II: The S 30 Type E-boat was severely damaged by coastal artillery off the harbour of Valletta, Malta. She was subsequently scuttled by a Messerschmitt Bf 109 aircraft of the Luftwaffe.
SKR-21	Soviet Navy	World War II: The auxiliary guard ship was sunk by Luftwaffe aircraft at Iokanga. Four of her crew were killed. She was raised on 3 July 1944 and repaired, but was not recommissioned by the Soviet Navy.
San Victorio	United Kingdom	World War II: The Empire Pym-type tanker was torpedoed and sunk in the Caribbean Sea (11°40′N 62°33′W) by U-155 (Kriegsmarine) with the loss of 52 of the 53 people on board. She was on her maiden voyage. The survivor was rescued by USS Turquoise (United States Navy).
Skottland	Norway	World War II: The cargo ship was torpedoed and sunk in the Atlantic Ocean (43°06′N 67°20′W) by U-588 (Kriegsmarine) with the loss of one of her 24 crew. Survivors were rescued by the fishing vessel O. K. Service IV ( Canada).
Tazan Maru	Japan	World War II: The cargo liner was torpedoed and sunk in the South China Sea off the coast of French Indochina (6°22′N 108°36′E) by USS Skipjack (United States Navy).
Thames Maru	Japan	World War II: The Daifuku Maru No. 1-class cargo ship was torpedoed and damaged in the Pacific Ocean off Shimonomisaki, Honshu (33°28′N 135°35′E) by USS Silversides (United States Navy). She was beached to prevent sinking. She was refloated, repaired, and returned to service.
Tottori Maru	Japan	World War II: The cargo ship was torpedoed and sunk in the Pacific Ocean by USS Silversides (United States Navy).
No. 0137	Soviet Navy	The KM-2-class motor launch was lost on this date.

== 18 May ==
List of shipwrecks: 18 May 1942
Ship	State	Description
Bolsena	Italy	World War II: The cargo ship was sunk in the Mediterranean Sea off Benghazi, Libya by HMS Turbulent (Royal Navy). Fifty people (33 merchant crew, five armed guards and twelve military passengers) died in the sinking, or from their wounds. There were 36 survivors.
Duatepe	Turkey	World War II: The cargo ship was torpedoed and sunk in the Black Sea 10 nautical miles (19 km) off the coast of Bulgaria by ShCh-205 (Soviet Navy).
Fauna	Netherlands	World War II: The cargo ship was torpedoed and sunk in the Caicos Passage (22°10′N 72°30′W) by U-558 (Kriegsmarine) with the loss of two of her 29 crew.
Kaynardzha	Turkey	World War II: The schooner was shelled and sunk in the Black Sea 10 nautical miles (19 km) off the coast of Bulgaria by ShCh-205 (Soviet Navy).
Mercury Sun	United States	World War II: The tanker was torpedoed and sunk in the Caribbean Sea 125 nautical miles (232 km) south of Cape Corrientes, Cuba (20°01′N 84°26′W) by U-125 (Kriegsmarine) with the loss of six of her 35 crew. Survivors were rescued by SS Howard (United States).
Quaker City	United States	World War II: The cargo ship was torpedoed and sunk in the Atlantic Ocean 300 nautical miles (560 km) east of Barbados (15°47′N 53°12′W) by U-156 (Kriegsmarine) with the loss of eleven of her 40 crew. USS Blakeley (United States Navy) rescued some of the survivors; others reached land in their lifeboats.
Tisnaren	Sweden	World War II: The cargo ship was torpedoed, shelled and set afire in the Atlantic Ocean (3°28′N 32°15′W) by Comandante Cappellini or Mano (both Regia Marina). She consequently sank. Her 41 passengers and crew were rescued by Black Hawk (United States).
William J. Salman	United States	World War II: The cargo ship was torpedoed and sunk in the Caribbean Sea 125 nautical miles (232 km) south of Cape Frances, Cuba (20°08′N 83°46′W) by U-125 (Kriegsmarine) with the loss of six of her 28 crew. Survivors were rescued by Ķegums (Latvia).

== 19 May ==
List of shipwrecks: 19 May 1942
Ship	State	Description
Commandate Lyra	Brazil	World War II: The cargo ship was torpedoed and damaged in the Atlantic Ocean by Barbarigo (Regia Marina)and was abandoned by her crew, two of whom were reported missing. Survivors were rescued by USS Milwaukee and USS Moffett (both United States Navy). A salvage party from USS Omaha (United States Navy was placed on board Commandate Lyra. She was towed to Fortaleza by USS Thrush (United States Navy).
Heredia	United States	World War II: The refrigerated cargo ship was torpedoed and sunk in the Gulf of Mexico 2 nautical miles (3.7 km) south east of the Ship Shoal Buoy, Louisiana (28°53′N 91°03′W) by U-506 (Kriegsmarine) with the loss of 36 of her 62 crew. Survivors were rescued by the shrimpers Conquest, J. Edwin Treakle, Papa Joe and Shellwater (all United States), and an aircraft.
Isabela	United States	World War II: The cargo ship was torpedoed and sunk in the Caribbean Sea 35 nautical miles (65 km) south of the Navassa Island Lighthouse (17°50′N 75°00′W) by U-751 (Kriegsmarine) with the loss of three of her 37 crew.
Ogontz	United States	World War II: The cargo ship was torpedoed and sunk in the Gulf of Mexico 70 nautical miles (130 km) south east of Cozumel, Mexico (23°30′N 86°37′W) by U-103 (Kriegsmarine) with the loss of nineteen of her 41 crew. Survivors were rescued by Esso Dover (United States).
Penelope	Italy	World War II: The cargo ship was sunk in the Mediterranean Sea by HMS Thrasher (Royal Navy).

== 20 May ==
List of shipwrecks: 20 May 1942
Ship	State	Description
Darina	United Kingdom	World War II: The tanker (8,113 GRT) was torpedoed, shelled and sunk in the Atlantic Ocean 500 nautical miles (930 km) south east of Bermuda (29°17′N 54°25′W) by U-158 (Kriegsmarine). Four of her 56 crew were killed and two more died of wounds. Survivors were rescued by British Ardour (United Kingdom), Dagrun (Norway) and Exanthia (United States).
Eocene	United Kingdom	World War II: Convoy AT 46: The tanker was torpedoed and sunk in the Mediterranean Sea off Sollum, Egypt (31°56′N 25°14′E) by U-431 (Kriegsmarine). All 43 people on board were rescued by HMT Cocker (Royal Navy).
George Calvert	United States	World War II: The Liberty ship was torpedoed and sunk in the Caribbean Sea off the coast of Cuba (22°50′N 84°30′W) by U-753 (Kriegsmarine) with the loss of three of her 51 crew.
Halo	United States	World War II: The tanker was torpedoed and sunk in the Gulf of Mexico (28°42′N 90°08′W) by U-506 (Kriegsmarine) with the loss of 39 of her 42 crew. Survivors were rescued by Oaxaca (Mexico) and Otina (United Kingdom).
Kattegat	Norway	World War II: The cargo ship was shelled and sunk in the South Atlantic (28°11′S 11°30′W) by Michel (Kriegsmarine). Her 32 crew were taken on board Michel as prisoners of war.
Norland	Norway	World War II: Convoy ON 93: The tanker was torpedoed, shelled and sunk in the Atlantic Ocean (31°22′N 55°47′W) by U-108 (Kriegsmarine). Her 48 crew were rescued by Polyphemus (Netherlands) and USS PT-453 (United States Navy.
Sylvan Arrow	Panama	World War II: Convoy OT 1: The tanker was torpedoed and damaged in the Caribbean Sea (11°25′N 62°18′W) by U-155 (Kriegsmarine) with the loss of one of her 44 crew. Survivors were rescued by USS Barney (United States Navy). Sylvan Arrow was taken in tow, but sank on 28 May at 12°50′N 67°32′W.
Vestra	Norway	World War II: The cargo ship struck a mine and sank in the Skagerrak off the Falsterbo Lighthouse, Sweden. She was salvaged, repaired and returned to service.
USS YP-387	United States Navy	The yard patrol craft as sunk in a collision with the collier Jason off the coast of Delaware (39°02′N 74°39′W) with the loss of six of her 21 crew. Jason rescued the survivors.

== 21 May ==
List of shipwrecks: 21 May 1942
Ship	State	Description
Clare	United States	World War II: The cargo ship (3,372 GRT) was torpedoed and sunk in the Caribbean Sea 40 nautical miles (74 km) off Cuba (at 21°35′N 84°43′W) by U-103 (Kriegsmarine). All 40 crew survived, some reached land in their lifeboat, others were rescued from their liferafts by a Cuban Navy gunboat.
Elizabeth	United States	World War II: The cargo ship (4,727 GRT) was torpedoed and sunk in the Caribbean Sea 30 nautical miles (56 km) south of Cape Corrientes, Cuba (21°35′N 84°48′W) by U-103 (Kriegsmarine) with the loss of six of her 42 crew.
Faja de Oro	Mexico	World War II: The tanker was torpedoed and sunk in the Gulf of Mexico at 23°30′N 84°24′W by U-106 (Kriegsmarine) with the loss of ten of her 31 crew.
RFA Montenol	Royal Fleet Auxiliary	World War II: Convoy OS 28: The tanker was torpedoed and damaged in the Atlantic Ocean 140 nautical miles (260 km) east south east of Santa Maria Island, Azores, Portugal (36°41′N 22°45′W) by U-159 (Kriegsmarine) with the loss of three of her 64 crew. Survivors were rescued by HMS Woodruff (Royal Navy). RFA Montenol was scuttled by HMS Wellington (Royal Navy).
New Brunswick	United Kingdom	World War II: Convoy OS 28: The cargo ship was torpedoed and sunk in the Atlantic Ocean 140 nautical miles (260 km) east southeast of Santa Maria Island (36°53′N 22°55′W) by U-159 (Kriegsmarine) with the loss of three of her 62 crew. Survivors were rescued by Inchanga (United Kingdom), HMS Totland, HMS Wellington, HMS Weston and HMS Woodruff (all Royal Navy).
Presidente Trujillo	Dominican Republic	World War II: The cargo ship was torpedoed and sunk in the Caribbean Sea off Fort-de-France, Martinique (14°38′N 61°11′W) by U-156 (Kriegsmarine) with the loss of 24 of her 39 crew.
Torondoc	Canada	World War II: The cargo ship was torpedoed and sunk in the Caribbean Sea 60 nautical miles (110 km) north west of Martinique (14°45′N 62°15′W) by U-69 (Kriegsmarine) with the loss of all 22 crew.
Troisdoc	Canada	World War II: The cargo ship was torpedoed, shelled and sunk in the Caribbean Sea (18°15′N 79°20′W) by U-558 (Kriegsmarine). All eighteen crew were rescued by USCGC Mohawk ( United States Coast Guard).

== 22 May ==
List of shipwrecks: 22 May 1942
Ship	State	Description
Asahisan Maru	Imperial Japanese Navy	World War II: The Asahisan Maru-class transport ship was torpedoed and damaged in the Kii Strait by USS Silversides (United States Navy). She lost her bow and was beached. She was refloated on 27 May, then repaired and returned to service on 15 July 1943.
E. P. Theriault	United Kingdom	World War II: The schooner was stopped in the Gulf of Mexico 55 nautical miles (102 km) west of Dry Tortuga by U-753 (Kriegsmarine). After her crew abandoned ship a scuttling attempt by a boarding party failed. E. P. Theriault drifted ashore on 27 May in the Bay of Cárdenas. The crew sailed to Cuba in their lifeboats. After her cargo was salvaged she was refloated on 3 June 1942. She was repaired, sold, and put into Cuban service as Ofelia Gancedo.
Frank B. Baird	Canada	World War II: The cargo ship was torpedoed and sunk in the Atlantic Ocean (28°03′N 58°50′W) by U-158 (Kriegsmarine). Her 23 crew were rescued by Talisman (Norway).
Plow City	United States	World War II: The cargo ship was torpedoed and sunk in the Atlantic Ocean 200 nautical miles (370 km) off Cape May, New Jersey (38°53′N 69°57′W) by U-588 (Kriegsmarine) with the loss of one of her 31 crew. Survivors were rescued by USS Sapphire (United States Navy).
TKA-103	Soviet Navy	World War II: The torpedo boat was shelled and sunk at Leningrad by German artillery.
TKA-123	Soviet Navy	World War II: The torpedo boat was shelled and sunk at Leningrad by German artillery.

== 23 May ==
List of shipwrecks: 23 May 1942
Ship	State	Description
Asuncion	Germany	World War II: The cargo ship struck a mine and sank off the coast of Norway (70°17′N 21°21′E).
Margot	United Kingdom	World War II: The cargo ship was torpedoed and sunk in the Atlantic Ocean south east of Philadelphia, Pennsylvania (approximately 39°N 68°W) by U-588 (Kriegsmarine) with the loss of one of her 45 crew. Survivors were rescued by Sagoland (Sweden).
Safak	Turkey	World War II: The cargo ship was sunk in the Black Sea off Burgas, Bulgaria by ShCh-205 (Soviet Navy).
Samuel Q. Brown	United States	World War II: The tanker was torpedoed and damaged in the Caribbean Sea 100 nautical miles (190 km) south of Cape Corrientes, Cuba (20°15′N 84°37′W) by U-103 (Kriegsmarine) with the loss of two of her 55 crew. Five injured crew were rescued by a United States Navy aircraft based at Upham, Canal Zone. The rest of the survivors were rescued on 25 May by USS Goff (United States Navy), which scuttled the ship.
V 1808 Dortmund	Kriegsmarine	World War II: The Einswarden-class naval trawler/Vorpostenboot struck a mine and sank in the Broad Fourteens.
Watsonville	Panama	World War II: The Design 1049 cargo ship was torpedoed and sunk in Saint Vincent Passage (13°12′N 61°20′W) by U-155 (Kriegsmarine). Her crew survived.
USS YP-277	United States Navy	World War II: The yard patrol craft/naval trawler struck a mine, burned and sank, or was scuttled, at the French Frigate Shoals. There were only two survivors.
Zurichmoor	United Kingdom	World War II: The cargo ship was torpedoed and sunk in the Atlantic Ocean 400 nautical miles (740 km) east of Philadelphia, Pennsylvania, United States (39°30′N 66°00′W) by U-432 (Kriegsmarine) with the loss of all 45 crew.

== 24 May ==
List of shipwrecks: 24 May 1942
Ship	State	Description
Anna Mazaraki	Greece	The cargo ship (5,411 GRT, 1913) was stranded on the East Bar of Sable Island, Nova Scotia, Canada. She was on a voyage from Swansea, Glamorgan, United Kingdom, to Halifax, Nova Scotia.
Bør	Norway	World War II: The coaster struck a mine and sank in the North Sea off the coast of the Netherlands (53°18′N 1°09′E). Seventeen of her crew were rescued by Kong Sigurd (Norway).
Gonçalves Dias	Brazil	World War II: The Design 1022 ship was torpedoed and sunk in the Caribbean Sea 100 nautical miles (190 km) south of Ciudad Trujillo, Dominican Republic (16°09′N 70°00′W) by U-502 (Kriegsmarine) with the loss of six of her 45 crew.
Hector	Netherlands	World War II: The cargo ship was torpedoed and sunk in the Caribbean Sea 60 nautical miles (110 km) north west of Grand Cayman (19°50′N 81°53′W) by U-103 (Kriegsmarine) with the loss of two of her 31 crew. Survivors were rescued by F. Q. Barstow (United States).
L-21	Soviet Union	World War II: While under construction, the Leninets-class submarine was sunk in a German air raid on Leningrad. She was subsequently raised, repaired, and commissioned into the Soviet Navy.

== 25 May ==
List of shipwrecks: 25 May 1942
Ship	State	Description
Asahi	Imperial Japanese Navy	World War II: The Asahi-class repair ship was torpedoed and sunk in the South China Sea 100 miles (160 km) south west of Cape Paderan, French Indochina (10°00′N 110°00′E) by USS Salmon (United States Navy) with the loss of sixteen of her 599 crew.
Beatrice	United States	World War II: The cargo ship was torpedoed and sunk in the Caribbean Sea (17°21′N 76°07′W) by U-558 (Kriegsmarine) with the loss of one of her 31 crew. Survivors were rescued by HMT Hauken (Royal Navy) or reached land in their lifeboat.
Emmy	Greece	The cargo ship was driven ashore in Morien Bay, Cape Breton Island, Nova Scotia, Canada and was wrecked.
Kitakata Maru	Japan	World War II: The cargo ship was torpedoed and sunk in the Pacific Ocean off the coast of Japan by USS Drum (United States Navy).
Persephone	Panama	World War II: The tanker was torpedoed and damaged in the Atlantic Ocean off the Barnegat Lighthouse, New Jersey, United States (39°44′N 73°53′W) by U-593 (Kriegsmarine) with the loss of nine of her 37 crew. She broke in two and sank; however the bow section was later salvaged and its cargo was recovered. The stern section was dispersed by the United States Coast Guard as it was a hazard to navigation.
Shoka Maru	Imperial Japanese Navy	World War II: The Heito Maru-class auxiliary transport was torpedoed and sunk in the Pacific Ocean 190 miles (310 km) south of Woleai, Caroline Islands by USS Tautog (United States Navy). Two of her 65 crew were killed. One of the survivors died while they sailed in their lifeboats to Faraulep Island (07°20′N 143°50′E), where they arrived on 9 June.
Tokyo Maru	Japan	World War II: The tanker was torpedoed and sunk in the East China Sea by USS Pompano (United States Navy).

== 26 May ==
List of shipwrecks: 26 May 1942
Ship	State	Description
Alcoa Carrier	United States	World War II: The cargo ship was torpedoed, shelled and sunk in the Caribbean Sea 125 nautical miles (232 km) north west of Montego Bay, Jamaica (18°45′N 79°50′W) by U-103 (Kriegsmarine). Her 35 crew were rescued by a Cuban Navy gunboat and a United States Navy aircraft.
Carrabulle	United States	World War II: The Design 1022 ship, converted to a tanker, was torpedoed and sunk in the Gulf of Mexico (26°18′N 89°21′W) by U-106 (Kriegsmarine) with the loss of 22 of her 40 crew. Survivors were rescued by Thomson Lykes (United States).
HMS Eddy	Royal Navy	World War II: The naval drifter/minesweeper sank after hitting a mine off Grand Harbour, Malta.
Enseigne Maurice Préchac	France	The cargo ship sprang a leak in the Atlantic Ocean. She foundered the next day (37°55′N 23°40′W).
Syros	United States	World War II: Convoy PQ 16: The cargo ship was torpedoed and sunk in the Norwegian Sea 200 nautical miles (370 km) south west of Bear Island (72°35′N 5°30′E) by U-703 (Kriegsmarine) with the loss of eleven of her 39 crew. Survivors were rescued by HMS Hazard (Royal Navy).
Vardø	Norway	World War II: The coaster was shelled and sunk at Murmansk, Soviet Union by land-based artillery.
No. 916	Soviet Navy	The KM-4-class river minesweeping launch was sunk on this date.

== 27 May ==
List of shipwrecks: 27 May 1942
Ship	State	Description
Alamar	United States	World War II: Convoy PQ 16: The cargo ship was attacked and set afire 100 nautical miles (190 km) east of Bear Island, Norway by Heinkel He 111 or Junkers Ju 88 aircraft of the Luftwaffe. She was scuttled by HMS Trident (Royal Navy). Her 45 crew survived.
Arctic Pioneer	Royal Navy	World War II: The naval trawler was bombed and sunk in Cowes Roads, outside Portsmouth Harbour, Hampshire, by Junkers Ju 87 aircraft of the Luftwaffe with the loss of seventeen of her 33 crew.
Athelknight	United Kingdom	World War II: The tanker was torpedoed and sunk in the Atlantic Ocean (27°50′N 46°00′W) by U-172 (Kriegsmarine) with the loss of nine of her 54 crew. Survivors were rescued by Empire Austen (United Kingdom) or reached land in their lifeboats.
Empire Lawrence	United Kingdom	World War II: Convoy PQ 16: The CAM ship was bombed and sunk in the Barents Sea east of Bear Island by Luftwaffe aircraft.
Empire Purcell	United Kingdom	World War II: Convoy PQ 16: The cargo ship was bombed and sunk in the Barents Sea (74°00′N 26°08′E) by Luftwaffe aircraft. Eight of her crew were killed.
HMS Fitzroy	Royal Navy	World War II: The Hunt-class minesweeper struck a mine and sank in the North Sea off Great Yarmouth, Norfolk with the loss of thirteen of her crew.
Hamlet	Norway	World War II: The tanker was torpedoed and sunk in the Atlantic Ocean (28°25′N 91°00′W) by U-753 (Kriegsmarine). Her 36 crew survived.
USAT Jack	United States Army	World War II: The Design 1093 ship was torpedoed and sunk in the Caribbean Sea 100 nautical miles (190 km) south west of Port Salut, Haiti (17°36′N 74°42′W) by U-558 (Kriegsmarine) with the loss of 37 of her 60 crew. Fourteen of the survivors were rescued by USS Grunion (United States Navy).
K 12	United States	The scow sank 8 nautical miles (15 km; 9.2 mi) west of Cape Saint Elias, Territory of Alaska.
Lowther Castle	United Kingdom	World War II: Convoy PQ 16: The cargo ship was torpedoed and sunk 60 nautical miles (110 km) east south east of Bear Island by Heinkel He 111 or Junkers Ju 88 aircraft of the Luftwaffe with the loss of one of her 54 crew.
Mormacsul	United States	World War II: Convoy PQ 16: The cargo ship was bombed and sunk off North Cape, Norway by Heinkel He 111 or Junkers Ju 888 aircraft of the Luftwaffe with the loss of three of her 48 crew. She was on a voyage from Philadelphia, Pennsylvania to a port in the northern part of the Soviet Union.
Polyphemus	Netherlands	World War II: The cargo ship was torpedoed and sunk in the Atlantic Ocean 340 nautical miles (630 km) north east of Bermuda (38°12′N 63°22′W) by U-578 (Kriegsmarine) with the loss of fifteen of the 75 people on board, but none of the survivors from Norland (Norway) that were on board. Survivors were rescued by Maria Amelia (Portugal) or reached land in their lifeboats.

== 28 May ==
List of shipwrecks: 28 May 1942
Ship	State	Description
Alcoa Pilgrim	United States	World War II: The Type C1 ship was sunk by torpedo in the Caribbean Sea 150 nautical miles (280 km) south of the Mona Passage (16°28′N 67°37′W) by U-502 (Kriegsmarine) with the loss of 31 of her 40 crew. Survivors were rescued by Thomas Nelson (United Kingdom).
Charlbury	United Kingdom	World War II: The cargo ship was torpedoed, shelled and sunk in the South Atlantic north east of Recife, Brazil (6°22′S 29°44′W) by Barbarigo (Regia Marina).
City of Joliet	United States	World War II: Convoy PQ 16: The crgo ship was sunk in the Barents Sea (73°41′N 26°06′E) by Heinkel He 111 or Junkers Ju 88 aircraft of the Luftwaffe. Her 45 crew were rescued.
Ganges Maru	Japan	World War II: The cargo liner was torpedoed and sunk in the South China Sea by USS Salmon (United States Navy).
Mentor	United Kingdom	World War II: The cargo ship was torpedoed and sunk in the Gulf of Mexico (24°11′N 87°02′W) by U-106 (Kriegsmarine) with the loss of four of her 86 crew. Survivors were rescued by Antilochus (United Kingdom).
New Jersey	United States	World War II: The cargo ship was torpedoed and sunk in the Caribbean Sea 90 nautical miles (170 km) south west of Grand Cayman (18°32′N 82°28′W) by U-103 (Kriegsmarine). Her 42 crew were rescued by USS Biddle and USS Tattnall (both United States Navy).
Poseidon	Netherlands	World War II: The cargo ship was torpedoed and sunk in the Atlantic Ocean (14°35′N 58°19′W) by U-155 (Kriegsmarine) with the loss of all 32 crew.
Sperrbrecher 174 Tindefjell	Kriegsmarine	World War II: The Sperrbrecher struck a mine and sank in the North Sea west of Dunkirk, Nord, France.
Western Head	United Kingdom	World War II: The cargo ship (2,599 GRT) was torpedoed and sunk in the Windward Passage 50 nautical miles (93 km) east of Guantánamo Bay, Cuba (19°57′N 74°18′W) by U-107 (Kriegsmarine) with the loss of 24 of her 30 crew. Survivors were rescued by a United States Navy vessel.
Yorkmoor	United Kingdom	World War II: The cargo ship was shelled and sunk in the Atlantic Ocean (29°54′30″N 72°25′30″W) by U-506 (Kriegsmarine). Her 45 crew were rescued by Laguna (United Kingdom and a United States Coast Guard cutter.

== 29 May ==
List of shipwrecks: 29 May 1942
Ship	State	Description
Allister	United Kingdom	World War II: The cargo ship was torpedoed and sunk in the Caribbean Sea 54 nautical miles (100 km) south of Grand Cayman (18°23′N 81°13′W) by U-504 (Kriegsmarine) with the loss of fifteen of her 23 crew.
Capo Arma	Italy	World War II: The cargo ship was torpedoed and sunk in the Mediterranean Sea 33°07′N 19°28′E) by HMS Turbulent (Royal Navy).
Emanuele Pessagno	Regia Marina	World War II: The Navigatori-class destroyer was torpedoed and sunk in the Mediterranean Sea north-northwest of Benghazi, Libya, by the submarine HMS Turbulent (Royal Navy).
Hudavendigar	Turkey	World War II: The sailing ship was sunk by ramming in the Black Sea east south east of Cape Igneada, Turkey (41°50′N 28°14′E) by ShCh-214 (Soviet Navy).
Niels R. Finsen	Denmark	World War II: The cargo ship struck a mine and sank in the North Sea off Ameland, Friesland, Netherlands.
V1103 Nordkap	Kriegsmarine	World War II: The Vorpostenboot truck a mine and sank in the North Sea off Ameland.
Norman Prince	United Kingdom	World War II: The cargo ship was torpedoed and sunk in the Caribbean Sea 60 nautical miles (110 km) west of Saint Lucia (14°40′N 62°15′W) by U-156 (Kriegsmarine) with the loss of sixteen of her 49 crew. Survivors were rescued by Angoulême (France) and USCGC Unalga ( United States Coast Guard). Norman Prince was on a voyage from Liverpool, Lancashire to Saint Lucia.
Sperrbrecher 150 Viriato	Kriegsmarine	World War II: The Sperrbrecher struck a mine and sank in the North Sea off Dunkerque, Nord, France.
Sulina	Romania	World War II: The cargo ship was torpedoed and sunk off Odesa, Soviet Union (46°31′N 30°52′E) by A-3 (Soviet Navy).
Tatsufuku Maru	Japan	World War II: The cargo ship was torpedoed and sunk at the south west entrance to the Balabac Strait (7°33′N 116°18′E) by USS Seal and USS Swordfish (both United States Navy).
U-568	Kriegsmarine	World War II: The Type VIIC submarine was depth charged and sunk in the Mediterranean Sea north east of Tobruk, Libya by HMS Eridge, HMS Hero and HMS Hurworth (all Royal Navy). Her 47 crew survived.

== 30 May ==
List of shipwrecks: 30 May 1942
Ship	State	Description
Alcoa Shipper	United States	World War II: The cargo ship was torpedoed and sunk in the Atlantic Ocean 500 nautical miles (930 km) east of Cape Charles, Virginia (37°49′N 65°15′W) by U-404 (Kriegsmarine) with the loss of seven of her 32 crew. Survivors were rescued by Margrethe Bakke (Norway).
Atuta Maru	Imperial Japanese Army	World War II: Convoy No. 129: The Kamo Maru-class auxiliary transport was torpedoed and sunk in the Pacific Ocean (26°08′N 128°48′E) by USS Pompano (United States Navy) and burned for three days before sinking 50 miles (80 km) east of Chenenzaki, Okinawa on 3 June. Thirty-seven passengers and 39 of her crew were killed.
Baghdad	Norway	World War II: The cargo ship was torpedoed and sunk in the Atlantic Ocean (14°15′N 54°30′W) by U-155 (Kriegsmarine) with the loss of nine of her 30 crew.
British Loyalty	United Kingdom	World War II: The tanker (6,993 GRT) was torpedoed and sunk at Diego Suarez, Madagascar by the midget submarine M-20b (Imperial Japanese Navy) with the loss of five crew and one gunner. She was salvaged in December 1942, repaired and used as a hulk at Addu Atoll, Maldives from March 1943 until the end of the war. She was scuttled there on 15 January 1946.
George Clymer	United States	World War II: The Liberty ship became disabled with engine trouble 600 miles (970 km) south west of Ascension Island. On 6 June, she was torpedoed and damaged in the Atlantic Ocean by a motor torpedo boat launched from Michel (Kriegsmarine). She was scuttled at 14°32′S 20°31′W by HMS Alcantara (Royal Navy) on 7 June.
Oi Maru No. 2	Imperial Japanese Navy	World War II: The Kitakami Maru-class auxiliary storeship (488 GRT) was sunk by a defensive mine at Maloelap Atoll, Marshall Islands.
Orkan	Germany	World War II: The cargo ship struck a mine and sank in the Baltic Sea off Greifswald.
St. Angelo	United Kingdom	World War II: The Admiralty tug was sunk after hitting a mine off Grand Harbour, Malta.
Sperrbrecher 166 Schirmeck	Kriegsmarine	The Sperrbrecher was sunk in a collision with Obra (Kriegsmarine).
Värmdö	Sweden	World War II: The ore carrier was bombed and sunk in the North Sea off Den Helder, North Holland, Netherlands by aircraft of Coastal Command, Royal Air Force with the loss of seven lives.
Unnamed	China	World War II: The junk was sunk by machine gun and rifle fire off Puqi, Yuet Ching Bay by Unkai Maru No. 10 (Imperial Japanese Navy).

== 31 May ==
List of shipwrecks: 31 May 1942
Ship	State	Description
Bravo	Italy	World War II: The cargo ship was sunk in the Mediterranean Sea by HMS Proteus (Royal Navy).
Bushranger	Panama	World War II: The cargo ship (4,536 GRT) was torpedoed and sunk in the Caribbean Sea (18°15′N 82°25′W) by U-107 (Kriegsmarine) with the loss of seventeen of her 43 crew. Survivors were rescued by USCGC Nike ( United States Coast Guard).
RFA Dinsdale	Royal Fleet Auxiliary	World War II: The landing ship, gantry/tanker was torpedoed and sunk in the Atlantic Ocean north east of Pernambuco, Brazil (0°45′S 29°50′W) by Comandante Cappellini (Regia Marina) whilst on her maiden voyage. Five of her 57 crew were killed.
Fred W. Green	United Kingdom	World War II: The Design 1042 ship was torpedoed and sunk in the Atlantic Ocean 200 nautical miles (370 km) north east of Bermuda (30°20′N 62°00′W) by U-506 (Kriegsmarine) with the loss of five of her 46 crew. Survivors were rescued by USS Ludlow (United States Navy).
Gino Allegri	Italy	World War II: The cargo ship was torpedoed and damaged in the Mediterranean Sea (33°34′N 18°30′E) by HMS Taku (Royal Navy). She was then torpedoed and sunk (32°27′N 18°54′E) by HMS Proteus (Royal Navy.
Liverpool Packet1926	Canada	World War II: The cargo ship was torpedoed and sunk in the Atlantic Ocean 15 nautical miles (28 km) west of Seal Island, Nova Scotia (43°20′N 66°20′W) by U-432 (Kriegsmarine) with the loss of two of her 21 crew.
M-16b	Imperial Japanese Navy	World War II: Attack on Diego Suarez: The Type A Ko-hyoteki-class submarine disappeared after leaving her mother submarine.
M-20b	Imperial Japanese Navy	World War II: Attack on Diego Suarez: The Type A Ko-hyoteki-class submarine was beached at Nosy Antalikely islet. Her crew attempted to scuttle their craft, but the charge failed to explode. On 2 June both crew were killed by Royal Marines Commando No. 5 48 miles (77 km) from the grounding location, A Marine was killed.
M-27b	Imperial Japanese Navy	World War II: Attack on Sydney Harbour: The Type A Ko-hyoteki-class submarine was scuttled by her two-man crew, killing them both, after fouling a steel anti-submarine net whilst trying to enter the harbour.
Mahbubdihan	Turkey	World War II: The sailing ship was shelled and sunk in the Black Sea east south east of Cape Igneada (41°55′N 28°15′E) by ShCh-214 (Soviet Navy).
Shunsei Maru No. 5	Imperial Japanese Navy	World War II: The guard ship was torpedoed and sunk in the Pacific Ocean by USS Pollack (United States Navy).

== Unknown date ==
List of shipwrecks: Unknown date 1942
Ship	State	Description
MTSM 204, MTSM 206, MTSM 208, MTSM 210, and MTSM 216	Regia Marina	The MTSM-class motor torpedo boats were lost some time in May.
Tai Shan	Norway	The cargo ship sank at Liverpool, Lancashire, United Kingdom, some time after 15 May, when she had arrived with Convoy HX 188. She was subsequently repaired and returned to service.
