= Pacific Route =

Delivery route of goods between the United States and Russia in WWII

The Pacific Route was a delivery route used during World War II to move goods, particularly Lend-Lease goods from the United States to the Soviet Union.

This commenced in October 1941, though some goods had been moved prior to this under the "cash and carry" agreement. The route was affected by the start of hostilities between Japan and the US in December 1941, but was not interrupted as Japan and the Soviet Union maintained a strict neutrality towards each other for the duration of the conflict, changing only in August 1945. Due to this neutrality the goods could be moved only in Soviet-flagged ships, and, as they were inspected by the Japanese, could not include war materials. The route was therefore used to transport foods, raw materials and non-military goods such as lorries and other road vehicles, railway locomotives and rolling stock. It was also the most practical route for goods and materials produced in the US western states.

During the conflict the Pacific Route saw a steady stream of goods moved from the west coast of the United States and overall accounted for some 50% of all Lend-lease goods to the Soviet Union. The route closed in September 1945 with the end of the conflict and the cessation of the Lend-Lease scheme.

== Ships ==
Pacific Route cargo to Vladivostok was transported exclusively aboard independently routed Soviet ships. In 1942, twenty-seven United States cargo ships, built around 1919, were transferred to the Soviet Far East State Shipping Company (FESCO) as Lend-Lease provisions. Older Soviet ships had been excluded from the arctic JW convoys of faster Liberty ships to minimize travel time through the dangerous Barents Sea but were suitable for the Pacific route, and were later augmented by Liberty ships supplied to the Soviet Union.

== Routing ==
The operations of the Pacific Route were organized by Leonid Belakhov, Deputy Commissar and Chief Political Officer of the Ministry of the Maritime Fleet (MorFlot). Goods were moved from US west coast ports (principally Los Angeles, San Francisco, Seattle, and Columbia River ports) and moved via the Great circle route across the Pacific, skirting the Aleutians and the Kuriles. From there they passed via the Perouse strait to Vladivostok. When the Perouse strait was frozen, Soviet ships traveled south of Kyushu and entered the Sea of Japan through the Tsushima Strait to reach Vladivostok. Cargoes including military goods avoided Japanese inspection during the summer months by partially unloading in Petropavlovsk-Kamchatsky to reduce their draught to cross the shallow Amur River estuary and enter the Sea of Japan via the Strait of Tartary.

A branch of the Pacific Route began carrying goods through the Bering Strait to the Soviet Arctic coast in June, 1942. From July through September convoys of shallow draught ships and icebreakers assembled in Providence Bay, Siberia to sail north through the Bering Strait and west along the Northern Sea Route. Total westbound tonnage through the Bering Strait was 452,393 in comparison to 8,243,397 tons through Vladivostok. Part of this northern tonnage was fuel for the Alaska-Siberia Air Route airfields described below. Provisions for the airfields were transferred to river vessels and barges on the estuaries of large Siberian rivers.

== Trans-Siberian Railway ==
The total distance to the Trans-Siberian Railway transfer wharves was 6,000 miles (9,700 km) and took 18–20 days From Vladivostok nearly 400,000 railway car loads of goods were transhipped via the Trans-Siberian Railway to the industrial heart of the Soviet Union, a further 5,000 miles (8,000 km)

An Anglo-American delegation visited Moscow in October 1944 to discuss the Soviet Union joining the war against Japan, Russia required 60 divisions to counter the expected 45 Japanese divisions in Manchuria, and Alan Brooke (who was impressed by Stalin’s knowledge of technical detail) asked whether they could maintain 60 divisions and their strategic air force over the TSR. General Antonov (standing in for Marshal Aleksandr Vasilevsky, the CGS) replied in the affirmative, but Stalin himself said it was doubtful, and considered that assistance from America across the Pacific would be required. The capacity of the TSR was 36 pairs of trains per day, but only 26 could be counted on for military traffic. The capacity of each train was from 600 to 700 tons.

== Submarine danger ==
Even though Japan had been at war with the USA since December 1941, it was anxious to preserve good relations with the USSR, and, despite German complaints, usually allowed Soviet ships to sail between the USA and Soviet Union's Pacific ports unmolested. This contrasts with Germany and Britain's behavior, whose navies would often destroy or capture neutrals' ships sailing to their respective adversaries. As a result, during most of the war the Pacific Route became the safest path between the USA and the USSR.

Nonetheless, several Soviet ships were torpedoed by submarines in the western Pacific. Japanese submarine I-180 probably sank Pavlin Vinogradov in the Alaska Gulf on 22 April 1944; and the United States Navy sank six. USS Grenadier sank SS Angarstroy in the East China Sea on 1 May 1942. USS Sawfish sank Ilmen and Kola off Kyushu on 17 February 1943. Kola was the former United States flagged Pacific Northwest Orient Line Satartia transferred as Lend-Lease on 14 December 1942. Both ships were lighted, but Sawfish was unaware of the Soviet winter routing change. Sawfish was later able to identify five other ships as Soviet, and let them pass. In July USS Pompon launched torpedoes at a ship known to be "Russian" but alleged to have been improperly marked. The torpedoes missed. Soviet Lend-Lease Liberty ship Odessa was torpedoed near Akhomten Bay on 4 October 1943. Odessa was repaired, but USS S-44 was sunk in the area three days later, and is thought to have launched the torpedo. On 3 March 1944 USS Sand Lance torpedoed a ship off Kamchatka "positively identified" as Florida Maru. The torpedoes sank Belorussia. USS Sunfish sank Ob in the Sea of Okhotsk on 6 July 1944. USS Spadefish sank Transbalt near the Perouse strait on 13 June 1945 because the ship was unlighted and allegedly "not following a designated Russian route."

== The air route ==
The Pacific Route was augmented by the Alaska-Siberia Air Route (ALSIB), which was used to fly combat aircraft and goods from North America to Siberia and beyond. This route was safe from Japanese interference, as it was undertaken by Soviet pilots based in western Alaska. ALSIB was used to deliver nearly 8,000 aircraft, air cargo, and passengers from 7 October 1942 to the end of hostilities.

== Warehousing ==
Lend-Lease shipments were supported by holding and reconsignment points in Auburn, Washington and Lathrop, California where cargo that could not be promptly moved overseas was held until called to the ports. These facilities constructed with Lend-Lease funds contained single-story warehouses, 960 feet (290 m) long and 180 feet (55 m) wide, with platforms for loading and unloading railway tracks running the full length of each side and a platform for handling truck freight at one end. Nearby open storage areas were available for freight unloaded from railway cars with cranes. These 600-acre sites employed thousands of civilians and hundreds of Italian prisoners of war and included shops, roundhouses, a mess hall, fire station, dispensary, cafeteria, bachelor officers’ quarters and administration buildings. Fuels, explosives and refrigerated cargoes were handled elsewhere.

== Sources ==
- Blair, Clay (1975). Silent Victory. New York: J.B.Lippincott. ISBN 9780397007530.
- Ruge, Friedrich (1957). Der Seekreig. Annapolis, Maryland: United States Naval Institute.
- Vail Motter, T.H. (1952). The Persian Corridor and Aid to Russia. Washington DC: U.S. Government Printing Office.
