= German submarine U-588 =

German World War II submarine

History

Nazi Germany
- Name: U-588
- Ordered: 16 January 1940
- Builder: Blohm & Voss, Hamburg
- Yard number: 564
- Laid down: 31 October 1940
- Launched: 23 July 1941
- Commissioned: 18 September 1941
- Fate: Sunk on 31 July 1942

General characteristics
- Class & type: Type VIIC submarine
- Displacement: 769 tonnes (757 long tons) surfaced; 871 t (857 long tons) submerged
- Length: 67.10 m (220 ft 2 in) o/a; 50.50 m (165 ft 8 in) pressure hull
- Beam: 6.20 m (20 ft 4 in) o/a; 4.70 m (15 ft 5 in) pressure hull
- Height: 9.60 m (31 ft 6 in)
- Draught: 4.74 m (15 ft 7 in)
- Installed power: 2,800–3,200 PS (2,100–2,400 kW; 2,800–3,200 bhp) (diesels); 750 PS (550 kW; 740 shp) (electric)
- Propulsion: 2 shafts; 2 × diesel engines; 2 × electric motors
- Speed: 17.7 knots (32.8 km/h; 20.4 mph) surfaced; 7.6 knots (14.1 km/h; 8.7 mph) submerged
- Range: 8,500 nmi (15,700 km; 9,800 mi) at 10 knots (19 km/h; 12 mph) surfaced; 80 nmi (150 km; 92 mi) at 4 knots (7.4 km/h; 4.6 mph) submerged
- Test depth: 230 m (750 ft); Crush depth: 250–295 m (820–968 ft)
- Complement: 4 officers, 40–56 enlisted
- Armament: 5 × 53.3 cm (21 in) torpedo tubes (four bow, one stern); 14 × torpedoes or 26 TMA mines; 1 × 8.8 cm (3.46 in) deck gun (220 rounds); 1 x 2 cm (0.79 in) C/30 AA gun

Service record
- Part of: 6th U-boat Flotilla; 18 September 1941 – 31 July 1942
- Identification codes: M 19 687
- Commanders: Kptlt. Victor Vogel; 18 September 1941 – 31 July 1942
- Operations: 4 patrols: 1st patrol: 8 – 30 January 1942; 2nd patrol: 12 February – 27 March 1942; 3rd patrol: 19 April – 7 June 1942; 4th patrol: 19 – 31 July 1942
- Victories: 7 merchant ships sunk (31,492 GRT); 2 merchant ships damaged (13,131 GRT)

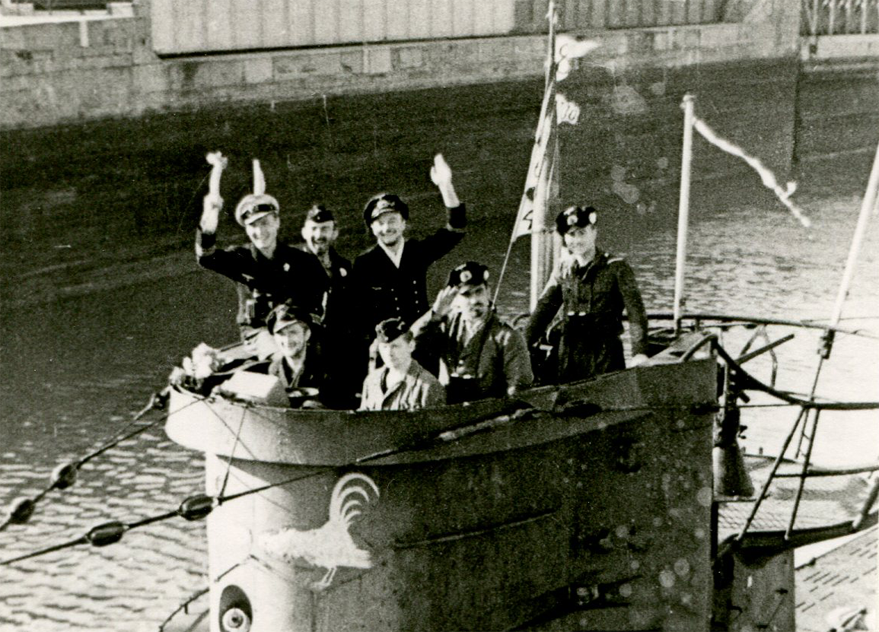
KptLt. Viktor Vogel with his crew entering St. Nazaire on the U-588

German submarine U-588 was a Type VIIC U-boat of Nazi Germany's Kriegsmarine during World War II.

She carried out four patrols, was a member of two wolfpacks, sank seven ships of 31,492 GRT and damaged two vessels of 13,131 GRT.

The boat was sunk by depth charges dropped by Canadian warships, east northeast of St. John's on 31 July 1942.

== Design ==
German Type VIIC submarines were preceded by the shorter Type VIIB submarines. U-588 had a displacement of 769 tonnes (757 long tons) when at the surface and 871 tonnes (857 long tons) while submerged. She had a total length of 67.10 m (220 ft 2 in), a pressure hull length of 50.50 m (165 ft 8 in), a beam of 6.20 m (20 ft 4 in), a height of 9.60 m (31 ft 6 in), and a draught of 4.74 m (15 ft 7 in). The submarine was powered by two Germaniawerft F46 four-stroke, six-cylinder supercharged diesel engines producing a total of 2,800 to 3,200 metric horsepower (2,060 to 2,350 kW; 2,760 to 3,160 shp) for use while surfaced, two Brown, Boveri & Cie GG UB 720/8 double-acting electric motors producing a total of 750 metric horsepower (550 kW; 740 shp) for use while submerged. She had two shafts and two 1.23 m (4 ft) propellers. The boat was capable of operating at depths of up to 230 metres (750 ft).

The submarine had a maximum surface speed of 17.7 knots (32.8 km/h; 20.4 mph) and a maximum submerged speed of 7.6 knots (14.1 km/h; 8.7 mph). When submerged, the boat could operate for 80 nautical miles (150 km; 92 mi) at 4 knots (7.4 km/h; 4.6 mph); when surfaced, she could travel 8,500 nautical miles (15,700 km; 9,800 mi) at 10 knots (19 km/h; 12 mph). U-588 was fitted with five 53.3 cm (21 in) torpedo tubes (four fitted at the bow and one at the stern), fourteen torpedoes, one 8.8 cm (3.46 in) SK C/35 naval gun, 220 rounds, and a 2 cm (0.79 in) C/30 anti-aircraft gun. The boat had a complement of between forty-four and sixty.

== Service history ==
The submarine was laid down on 31 October 1940 at Blohm & Voss, Hamburg as yard number 564, launched on 23 July 1941 and commissioned on 18 September under the command of Kapitänleutnant Viktor Vogel.

She served with the 6th U-boat Flotilla from 18 September 1941 for training and stayed with that organization for operations until her loss, from 1 January until 31 July 1942.

=== First patrol ===
U-588's first patrol began when she left Kiel on 8 January 1942 and headed for the Atlantic Ocean via the gap separating the Faroe and Shetland Islands. She sank Caledonian Monarch on the 22nd, 30 nautical miles (56 km; 35 mi) north northwest of Lewis. There was some confusion over the ships' fate; she was reported missing on the seventh, considered lost on the 14th, but it was not known if her loss was due to the weather or enemy action.

The U-boat arrived at Lorient in occupied France, on 30 January.

=== Second patrol ===
The boat's second foray took her toward the Canadian east coast, where she sank Caperby on 1 March 1942 about 520 nautical miles (960 km; 600 mi) southeast of Halifax, Nova Scotia.

She sank Gulftrade on 10 March, just 3 nautical miles (5.6 km; 3.5 mi) off the Barnegat Light. The ship was loaded with 80,000 barrels of 'Bunker C' oil. She broke in two on the impact of the torpedo, but the resulting fire was quickly extinguished by the high seas.

=== Third patrol ===
Staying inshore, U-588 damaged Greylock on 9 May 1942 about 10 nautical miles (19 km; 12 mi) from the Sambro Lightship, (itself off Halifax Harbour).

The next day, she sank Kitty's Brook 35 nautical miles (65 km; 40 mi) southeast of Cape Sable, Nova Scotia.

A steady stream of successes followed; i.e. Skottland on 17 May, Plow City on the 22nd and Margot on the 23rd. As far as Plow City was concerned, one survivor was taken aboard the U-boat for questioning but returned with cigarettes and rum. The German submariners also helped to right one of the ship's lifeboats. U-588 also damaged Fort Binger on 18 May 1942.

=== Fourth patrol and loss ===
By now based at St Nazaire, which the submarine left on 19 July 1942, U-588 was sunk on the 31st by depth charges dropped by Canadian warships, the corvette HMCS Wetaskiwin and the destroyer HMCS Skeena east northeast of St. John's, Newfoundland.

Forty-nine men died with U-588; there were no survivors.

=== Wolfpacks ===
U-588 took part in two wolfpacks, namely:

- Robbe (15 – 24 January 1942)
- Pirat (29 – 31 July 1942)

== Summary of raiding history ==
Date	Ship Name	Nationality	Tonnage (GRT)	Fate
22 January 1942	Caledonian Monarch	United Kingdom	5,851	Sunk
1 March 1942	Caperby	United Kingdom	4,890	Sunk
10 March 1942	Gulftrade	United States	6,776	Sunk
9 May 1942	Greylock	United States	7,460	Damaged
10 May 1942	Kitty's Brook	United Kingdom	4,031	Sunk
17 May 1942	Skottland	Norway	2,117	Sunk
18 May 1942	Fort Binger	United Kingdom	5,671	Damaged
22 May 1942	Plow City	United States	3,282	Sunk
22 May 1942	Margot	United Kingdom	4,545	Sunk

== Bibliography ==
- Busch, Rainer; Röll, Hans-Joachim (1999). German U-boat commanders of World War II : a biographical dictionary. Translated by Brooks, Geoffrey. London, Annapolis, Md: Greenhill Books, Naval Institute Press. ISBN 1-55750-186-6.
- Busch, Rainer; Röll, Hans-Joachim (1999). Der U-Boot-Krieg, 1939-1945: Deutsche U-Boot-Verluste von September 1939 bis Mai 1945 [German U-boat losses from September 1939 to May 1945] (in German). Vol. IV. Hamburg, Berlin, Bonn: Mittler. ISBN 3-8132-0514-2.
- Gröner, Eric; Jung, Dieter; Maass, Martin (1991). German Warships 1815-1945: U-boats and Mine Warfare Vessels. Vol. 2. Translated by Thomas, Keith; Magowan, Rachel. London: Conway Maritime Press. ISBN 0-85177-593-4.
- Kemp, Paul (1997). U-Boats Destroyed - German Submarine Losses in the World Wars. Arms & Armour. ISBN 1-85409-515-3.
