= German submarine U-125 (1940) =

German World War II submarine

Coordinates: 52°30′N 45°20′W

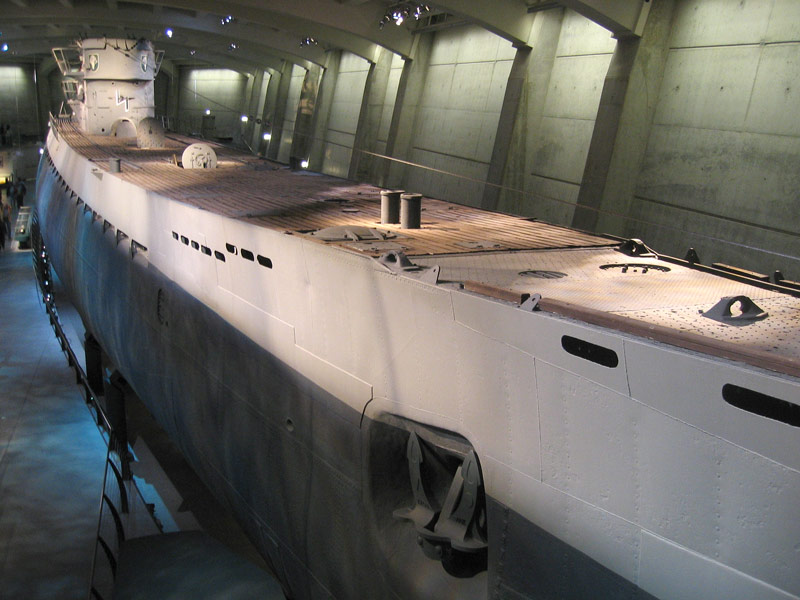
- U-505, a typical Type IXC boat

History

Nazi Germany
- Name: U-125
- Ordered: 7 August 1939
- Builder: DeSchiMAG AG Weser, Bremen
- Yard number: 988
- Laid down: 10 May 1940
- Launched: 10 December 1940
- Commissioned: 3 March 1941
- Fate: Sunk, 6 May 1943

General characteristics
- Class & type: Type IXC submarine
- Displacement: 1,120 t (1,100 long tons) surfaced; 1,232 t (1,213 long tons) submerged
- Length: 76.76 m (251 ft 10 in) o/a; 58.75 m (192 ft 9 in) pressure hull
- Beam: 6.76 m (22 ft 2 in) o/a; 4.40 m (14 ft 5 in) pressure hull
- Height: 9.60 m (31 ft 6 in)
- Draught: 4.70 m (15 ft 5 in)
- Installed power: 4,400 PS (3,200 kW; 4,300 bhp) (diesels); 1,000 PS (740 kW; 990 shp) (electric)
- Propulsion: 2 shafts; 2 × diesel engines; 2 × electric motors
- Speed: 18.3 knots (33.9 km/h; 21.1 mph) surfaced; 7.3 knots (13.5 km/h; 8.4 mph) submerged
- Range: 13,450 nmi (24,910 km; 15,480 mi) at 10 knots (19 km/h; 12 mph) surfaced; 64 nmi (119 km; 74 mi) at 4 knots (7.4 km/h; 4.6 mph) submerged
- Test depth: 230 m (750 ft)
- Complement: 4 officers, 44 enlisted
- Armament: 6 × torpedo tubes (4 bow, 2 stern); 22 × 53.3 cm (21 in) torpedoes; 1 × 10.5 cm (4.1 in) SK C/32 deck gun (180 rounds); 1 × 3.7 cm (1.5 in) SK C/30 AA gun; 1 × twin 2 cm FlaK 30 AA guns

Service record
- Part of: 2nd U-boat Flotilla; 3 March 1941 – 6 May 1943
- Identification codes: M 32 765
- Commanders: Kptlt. Günter Kuhnke; 3 March – 15 December 1941; Kptlt. Ulrich Folkers; 15 December 1941 – 6 May 1943
- Operations: 7 patrols: 1st patrol: 15 – 28 July 1941; 2nd patrol: 12 August – 5 November 1941; 3rd patrol: 18 December 1941 – 23 February 1942; 4th patrol: 4 April – 13 June 1942; 5th patrol: 27 July – 6 November 1942; 6th patrol: 9 December 1942 – 19 February 1943; 7th patrol: 13 April – 6 May 1943
- Victories: 17 merchant ships sunk (82,873 GRT)

German submarine U-125 was a Type IXC U-boat of Nazi Germany's Kriegsmarine during World War II. She was laid down at the DeSchiMAG AG Weser as yard number 988 on 10 May 1940, launched on 10 December and commissioned on 3 March 1941. In seven patrols, she sank 17 ships for a total of 82,873 gross register tons (GRT). The boat was a member of three wolfpacks. She was sunk on 6 May 1943. All 54 men on board died.

== Design ==
German Type IXC submarines were slightly larger than the original Type IXBs. U-125 had a displacement of 1,120 tonnes (1,100 long tons) when at the surface and 1,232 tonnes (1,213 long tons) while submerged. The U-boat had a total length of 76.76 m (251 ft 10 in), a pressure hull length of 58.75 m (192 ft 9 in), a beam of 6.76 m (22 ft 2 in), a height of 9.60 m (31 ft 6 in), and a draught of 4.70 m (15 ft 5 in). The submarine was powered by two MAN M 9 V 40/46 supercharged four-stroke, nine-cylinder diesel engines producing a total of 4,400 metric horsepower (3,240 kW; 4,340 shp) for use while surfaced, two Siemens-Schuckert 2 GU 345/34 double-acting electric motors producing a total of 1,000 metric horsepower (740 kW; 990 shp) for use while submerged. She had two shafts and two 1.92 m (6 ft) propellers. The boat was capable of operating at depths of up to 230 metres (750 ft).

The submarine had a maximum surface speed of 18.3 knots (33.9 km/h; 21.1 mph) and a maximum submerged speed of 7.3 knots (13.5 km/h; 8.4 mph). When submerged, the boat could operate for 63 nautical miles (117 km; 72 mi) at 4 knots (7.4 km/h; 4.6 mph); when surfaced, she could travel 13,450 nautical miles (24,910 km; 15,480 mi) at 10 knots (19 km/h; 12 mph). U-125 was fitted with six 53.3 cm (21 in) torpedo tubes (four fitted at the bow and two at the stern), 22 torpedoes, one 10.5 cm (4.13 in) SK C/32 naval gun, 180 rounds, and a 3.7 cm (1.5 in) SK C/30 as well as a 2 cm (0.79 in) C/30 anti-aircraft gun. The boat had a complement of forty-eight.

== Service history ==
=== First and second patrols ===
U-125 departed Kiel on 15 July 1941 on her first patrol, under the command of Kapitänleutnant Günter Kuhnke, arriving in the recently captured French Atlantic port of Lorient fourteen days later. Her route took her along the Norwegian coast, through the gap separating the Faroe and Shetland Islands and into the Atlantic Ocean.

Her second patrol took her down the coast of West Africa, then through the Atlantic and back to her home-port without making any attacks. She ranged far and wide, heading for Brazil and back to Africa, toward Sierra Leone and Liberia.

=== Third patrol ===
U-125 had her first success on her third patrol, under her new commander Kapitänleutnant Ulrich Folkers, sinking the American merchant ship West Ivis off Cape Hatteras, North Carolina on 26 January 1942. The ship broke in two and went down after 14 minutes. The crew of 36 and the nine Armed Guards (the ship was armed with a 4-inch (100mm) gun, four .50 cal. and four .30 cal. machine guns) were lost.

=== Fourth patrol ===
U-125 sailed on her fourth and most successful patrol from Lorient on 4 April 1942. She made her first attack on the 23rd, sinking the American merchant ship Lammot Du Pont, about 500 nmi (930 km; 580 mi) south-east of Bermuda. Between 3 – 18 May, she sank a further eight merchant ships, in the Caribbean, south of Cuba, returning to her home port on 13 June. One victim, Calgarolite, was hit by two torpedoes but despite settling, did not sink. The boat's AA guns were used to shoot holes in the hull. Following the demise of Camayagua, a US Navy aircraft unsuccessfully searched for the U-boat; then flew to Georgetown where it dropped a note in the Commissioner's garden with information on the survivors.

=== Fifth and sixth patrols ===
U-125's next patrol, the fifth, beginning on 27 July 1942, took her to the coast of West Africa, where she sank six merchant ships between 1 September and 8 October, returning to Lorient on 6 November 1942. Following the sinking of Baron Ogilvy on 29 September, the survivors sighted a small convoy on 1 October and succeeded in attracting their attention with flares. Unfortunately, one of them ignited in the Chief Officer's hand, causing severe burns.

The Glendene went to the bottom 90 seconds after being hit. Despite this rapidity, 38 of the 43-man crew survived the sinking.

U-125 sailed on her sixth patrol on 9 December 1942, out into the central Atlantic, south-west of the Azores, but she made no attacks before returning to Lorient on 19 February 1943.

=== Seventh patrol and loss ===
U-125 left Lorient for the last time on her seventh patrol on 13 April 1943. She joined the "wolfpack" "Fink" (English: Finch) of 28 U-boats which were attacking the convoy ONS 5 between 26 April and 6 May 1943. This was during a period when the British code-breakers were unable to read German U-boat signals while they could read British convoy signals, and ONS 5 was intercepted by a strong U-boat force during an Atlantic storm. Nevertheless, the boat only sank one ship, on 4 May south of Cape Farewell (Greenland), she was perhaps ironically called Lorient, a straggler from ONS 5; there were no survivors.

ONS 5 was a 43-ship convoy, nine miles wide by two long, with one destroyer, one frigate, three corvettes and two rescue tugs to defend it. It was attacked by around thirty U-boats, and lost thirteen ships in total, while seven U-boats were sunk by the escorts and supporting aircraft. It was a particularly bloody battle which marked the turning point in the Battle of the Atlantic, showing that while determined mass attack by U-boats could break through convoy defences, this would prove too expensive a tactic to make U-boat warfare a winning strategy for Germany. Admiral Karl Dönitz lost his son in this battle.

==== Fate ====
At 03:00 on 6 May 1943 U-125 was located by radar in thick fog, rammed by HMS Oribi and disabled, she was unable to dive. At 03:54 the U-boat was sighted by the Flower-class corvettes Snowflake and Sunflower, and as Snowflake manoeuvred to attack, closing to 100 yards, the crew of U-125, realising their indefensible position, scuttled the boat. The captain of Snowflake signalled the Senior Officer Escort, Lieutenant Commander Robert Sherwood, proposing to pick them up, and received the response: "Not approved to pick up survivors." Snowflake and Sunflower thereupon resumed their positions around the convoy, while the crew of U-125 died in the Atlantic over the next few hours.

== Summary of raiding history ==
Date	Name	Nationality	Tonnage	Fate
26 January 1942	West Ivis	United States	5,666	Sunk
23 April 1942	Lammot Du Pont	United States	5,102	Sunk
3 May 1942	San Rafael	Dominican Republic	1,973	Sunk
4 May 1942	Tuscaloosa City	United States	5,687	Sunk
6 May 1942	Empire Buffalo	United Kingdom	6,404	Sunk
6 May 1942	Green Island	United States	1,946	Sunk
9 May 1942	Calgarolite	Canada	11,941	Sunk
14 May 1942	Comayagua	Honduras	2,493	Sunk
18 May 1942	Mercury Sun	United States	8,893	Sunk
18 May 1942	William J. Salman	United States	2,616	Sunk
1 September 1942	Ilorin	United Kingdom	815	Sunk
23 September 1942	Bruyère	United Kingdom	5,335	Sunk
29 September 1942	Baron Ogilvy	United Kingdom	3,391	Sunk
30 September 1942	Empire Avocet	United Kingdom	6,015	Sunk
30 September 1942	Kumsang	United Kingdom	5,447	Sunk
8 October 1942	Glendene	United Kingdom	4,412	Sunk
4 May 1943	Lorient	United Kingdom	4,737	Sunk

== See also ==
- List of successful U-boats
- Black May (1943)

== Bibliography ==
- Busch, Rainer; Röll, Hans-Joachim (1999). German U-boat commanders of World War II : a biographical dictionary. Translated by Brooks, Geoffrey. London, Annapolis, Md: Greenhill Books, Naval Institute Press. ISBN 1-55750-186-6.
- Busch, Rainer; Röll, Hans-Joachim (1999). Deutsche U-Boot-Verluste von September 1939 bis Mai 1945 [German U-boat losses from September 1939 to May 1945]. Der U-Boot-Krieg (in German). Vol. IV. Hamburg, Berlin, Bonn: Mittler. ISBN 3-8132-0514-2.
- Edwards, Bernard (1996). Dönitz and the Wolfpacks – The U-boats at War. Cassell Military Classics. pp. 198, 199. ISBN 0-304-35203-9.
- Gröner, Erich; Jung, Dieter; Maass, Martin (1991). U-boats and Mine Warfare Vessels. German Warships 1815–1945. Vol. 2. Translated by Thomas, Keith; Magowan, Rachel. London: Conway Maritime Press. ISBN 0-85177-593-4.
