= SS Empire Buffalo =

World War II merchant ship of the United Kingdom

History
- Name: Eglantine (1919-40); Empire Buffalo (1940-42)
- Owner: United States Shipping Board (1919-33); Lykes Brothers-Ripley Steamship Co (1933-40); Ministry of War Transport (1940-42)
- Operator: United States Shipping Board (1919-33); Lykes Brothers-Ripley Steamship Co (1933-40); Lyle Shipping Co Ltd (1940-42)
- Port of registry: (United States) Seattle (1919-33); (United States) New Orleans (1933-40); (United Kingdom) London (1940-42)
- Builder: Skinner & Eddy, Seattle
- Yard number: 68
- Launched: 25 October 1919
- Completed: November 1919
- Out of service: 6 May 1942
- Identification: US Official Number 219278 (1919-40); UK Official Number 168018 (1940-42); Code Letters LTVD (1919-34); Code Letters KOPT (1934-40); Code Letters GLRR (1940-42)
- Fate: Torpedoed and sunk by U-125

General characteristics
- Type: Design 1105 cargo ship
- Tonnage: 6,325 GRT (1919-37); 6,312 GRT (1937-40); 6,404 GRT (1940-42); 3,972 NRT (1919-37); 4,454 NRT (1937-40); 4,618 NRT (1940-42)
- Length: 405 ft 6 in (123.60 m)
- Beam: 54 ft 3 in (16.54 m)
- Depth: 32 ft 7 in (9.93 m)
- Propulsion: 1 x triple expansion steam engine
- Speed: 11.5 knots (21.3 km/h)
- Crew: 36, plus six DEMS gunners

Location of the sinking of Empire Buffalo.

Empire Buffalo was a 6,404 GRT Design 1105 cargo ship which was built in 1919 as Eglantine by Skinner & Eddy for the United States Shipping Board (USSB). She was sold in 1933 to the Lykes Brothers-Ripley Steamship Corporation. In 1940 she was sold to the Ministry of War Transport (MoWT) and renamed Empire Buffalo. She was torpedoed and sunk by U-125 in 1942.

== Description ==
Eglantine was built by Skinner & Eddy. She was yard number 68. Eglantine was launched on 25 October 1919 and completed in November 1919.

As built, the ship was 402 feet 6 inches (122.68 m) long, with a beam of 54 feet 8 inches (16.66 m) and a depth of 32 feet 1 inch (9.78 m). She was propelled by a triple expansion steam engine which had cylinders of 24 1/2 inches (62 cm), 41 1/2 inches (105 cm) and 72 inches (180 cm) bore by 48 inches (120 cm) stroke. The engine was built by Hooven, Owens & Rentschler, Hamilton, Ohio. The ship had a speed of 11.5 knots (21.3 km/h).

In 1930, Eglantine was recorded on Lloyd's Register as having a GRT of 6,325 with a NRT of 3,972. In 1938, she was recorded as having a GRT of 6,312 and a NRT of 4,456. In 1940, Empire Buffalo was recorded on Lloyds Register as having a GRT of 6,404 and a NRT of 4,618. Other sources list her as having a GRT of 6,374.

== Career ==
Eglantine's port of registry was Seattle. She was operated by the USSB until 1933 when she was sold to Lykes Brothers-Ripley Steamship Corporation. Her port of registry was changed to New Orleans. Eglantine served with Lykes Brothers until 1940 when she was sold to the MoWT and renamed Empire Buffalo.

She was operated under the management of Lyle Shipping Co Ltd. Her port of Registry was London. Empire Buffalo was a member of a number of convoys during the Second World War.

SC 34

Convoy SC 34 departed Sydney, Nova Scotia on 10 June 1941 and arrived at the Clyde on 29 June. Empire Buffalo was carrying a cargo of bombs, shells, steel, trucks and a general cargo. She was to proceed to the Mersey for orders.

SC 46

Convoy SC 46 departed Sydney on 24 September 1941. Empire Buffalo was carrying a cargo of phosphates. The convoy arrived at Liverpool on 10 October.

SC 71

Convoy SC 71 departed Halifax, Nova Scotia on 22 February 1942 and arrived at Liverpool on 10 March. Empire Buffalo was carrying general cargo bound for Newport, Monmouthshire.

At 22:25 German time on 6 May 1942, Empire Buffalo was torpedoed by U-125 and sunk west of the Cayman Islands (19°14′N 82°34′W). Thirteen of the crew were killed, including the Captain, John Hill. Twenty-nine survivors were rescued by SS Cacique and landed at Kingston, Jamaica. Empire Buffalo was on a voyage from Kingston to New Orleans in ballast. Those lost on Empire Buffalo are commemorated at the Tower Hill Memorial, London.

== Official Numbers and Code Letters ==
Official Numbers were a forerunner to IMO Numbers. Eglantine had the United States Official Number 219278. Empire Buffalo had the UK Official Number 168018.

Eglantine used the Code Letters LTVD until 1934, when they were changed to KOPT. Empire Buffalo used the Code Letters GLRR.
