= USS Turquoise =

Patrol vessel of the United States Navy

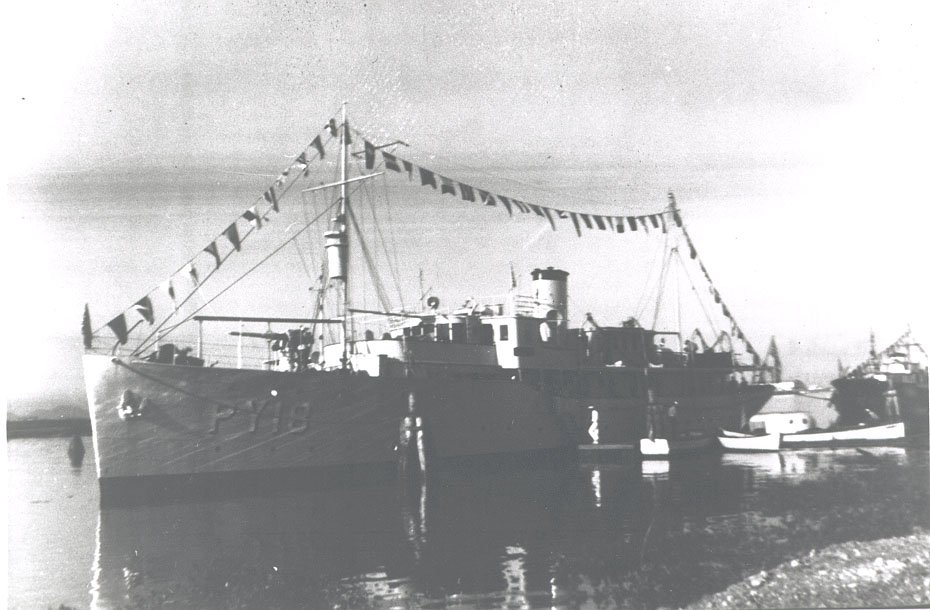
- USS Turquoise (PY-18)

History

United States
- Name: Ohio; Maramichi; Walucia III; Kallisto; Entropy
- Owner: Scripps-Howard Newspapers, Chicago, Illinois
- Builder: Newport News Shipbuilding and Dry Dock Company, Newport News, Virginia
- Laid down: 1 August 1922
- Launched: 16 September 1922
- Completed: November 1922
- Fate: Acquired by the Navy 21 August 1940

History

United States
- Name: Turquoise
- Namesake: Turquoise
- Acquired: 21 August 1940
- Commissioned: 5 December 1940
- Decommissioned: 24 December 1943
- Renamed: Turquoise, 1 February 1941
- Reclassified: Patrol Yacht, 1 February 1941
- Refit: Gibbs Gas Engine Works, Jacksonville, Florida, 25 September 1940
- Stricken: 7 June 1949
- Identification: Hull symbol:PC-459; Hull symbol:PY-18; Code letters:NPBX
- Fate: Transferred to Ecuador under the Lend-Lease Program 29 January 1944

History

Ecuador
- Name: Nueve de Octobre
- Acquired: 29 January 1944, sold outright to Ecuador 13 May 1949
- Renamed: 1949, Esmeraldas
- Fate: Ran aground in Gunyas River, near Guayaquil, Ecuador 9 September 1953 and declared a total loss

General characteristics
- Type: Yacht (1922–1940); Patrol Yacht (1940–1953)
- Displacement: 565 long tons (574 t)
- Length: 172 ft (52 m)
- Beam: 26 ft (7.9 m)
- Draft: 11 ft (3.4 m)
- Installed power: 2 × diesel engines; 1,500 bhp (1,100 kW)
- Propulsion: 2 × screws
- Speed: 14 knots (26 km/h; 16 mph)
- Complement: 60
- Armament: 1 × 3 in (76 mm)/50 caliber gun; 2 × depth charge tracks

USS Turquoise (PY-18), was a yacht in commission in the United States Navy as a Patrol Yacht from 1940 to 1943.

== Construction, acquisition, and commissioning ==
Ohio-a diesel yacht built in 1922 at Newport News, Virginia, by the Newport News Shipbuilding and Dry Dock Company-was laid down on 1 August 1922; launched on 16 September 1922; and delivered exactly two months later to Edward Willis Scripps, the publisher of the Scripps-Howard Newspapers. After Scripps died on board the yacht on 12 March 1926, as she lay anchored in Monrovia Bay, Liberia, the yacht served a succession of owners under the names Maramichi, Walucia III, Kallisto, and Entropy.

On 21 August 1940, as America girded for World War II, the United States Navy purchased Entropy from Robert V. G. Furman of Schenectady, New York, classified her a submarine chaser, and designated her PC-459. Since American submarine chasers were unnamed during World War II, the ship was known simply by her hull number, PC-459. The luxury craft entered the Gibbs-Jacksonville Yard at Jacksonville, Florida, on 25 September 1940 for conversion for naval use. On 5 December 1940, PC-459 was placed in commission at Jacksonville.

== Service history ==
Following commissioning, PC-459 put into Charleston Navy Yard, Charleston, South Carolina, on 9 December for fitting out. After spending the remainder of December 1940 and the better part of January 1941 in training exercises and shakedown, she got underway for Cuban waters in company with Seminole on 21 January. After a brief stay at Guantanamo Bay, PC-459 set out on 30 January for Puerto Rico.

Upon arrival at San Juan, Puerto Rico on 1 February 1941, PC-459 was reclassified a patrol yacht, designated PY-18, and named Turquoise. Operating under the Commandant of the 10th Naval District, Turquoise patrolled Caribbean waters through July as the Battle of the Atlantic moved ever closer to neutral waters on the American coast. On 1 August, when the Navy commissioned the Naval Operating Base at Trinidad, British West Indies, the patrol yacht received orders to report there for duty as temporary station ship.

She remained in the vicinity of Trinidad until early December, when she returned to Charleston for refit. On 7 December, the day after she entered the navy yard, the Empire of Japanese attacked Pearl Harbor. Four days later, on 11 December, Italy and Germany declared war on the United States.

Her refit shortened, Turquoise steamed back to Puerto Rico and arrived on 20 December. She operated in the Caribbean on local patrols into the early spring, when she returned to Charleston for availability. Upon the conclusion of the overhaul, she set out for San Juan on 9 April 1942. Upon arrival, she received orders to escort a YP and a dredge to Trinidad and then to report to the Commandant of the Naval Operating Base there for orders.

Besides inshore patrol duties out of Trinidad, she also escorted local convoys in the Caribbean area, called at such ports as Gonaives and Port-au-Prince, Haiti, besides the already-frequented San Juan, Trinidad, Key West, Florida, and Guantanamo Bay. But for occasional refits at Charleston, she continued such operations through most of 1943. In December 1943, she received orders to proceed to the Canal Zone.

== Transfer to the Ecuadorian Navy ==
Arriving on 24 December 1943, she was transferred under lend-lease to the Ecuadorian Navy on 29 January 1944. The yacht operated under the Ecuadorian flag as Nueve de Octobre (9 October) through 1949. She was sold to the Ecuadorian government on 13 May 1949 and was struck from the Navy list on 7 June 1949.

Renamed Esmeraldas, after a port city in Ecuador, she served with the Ecuadorian Navy into 1953. Esmeraldas ran aground in the Guayas River, near Guayaquil, and was declared a total loss on 9 September 1953.

Turquoise did not receive any battle stars for her World War II service.
