= USS Onyx (PYc-5) =

Patrol vessel of the United States Navy

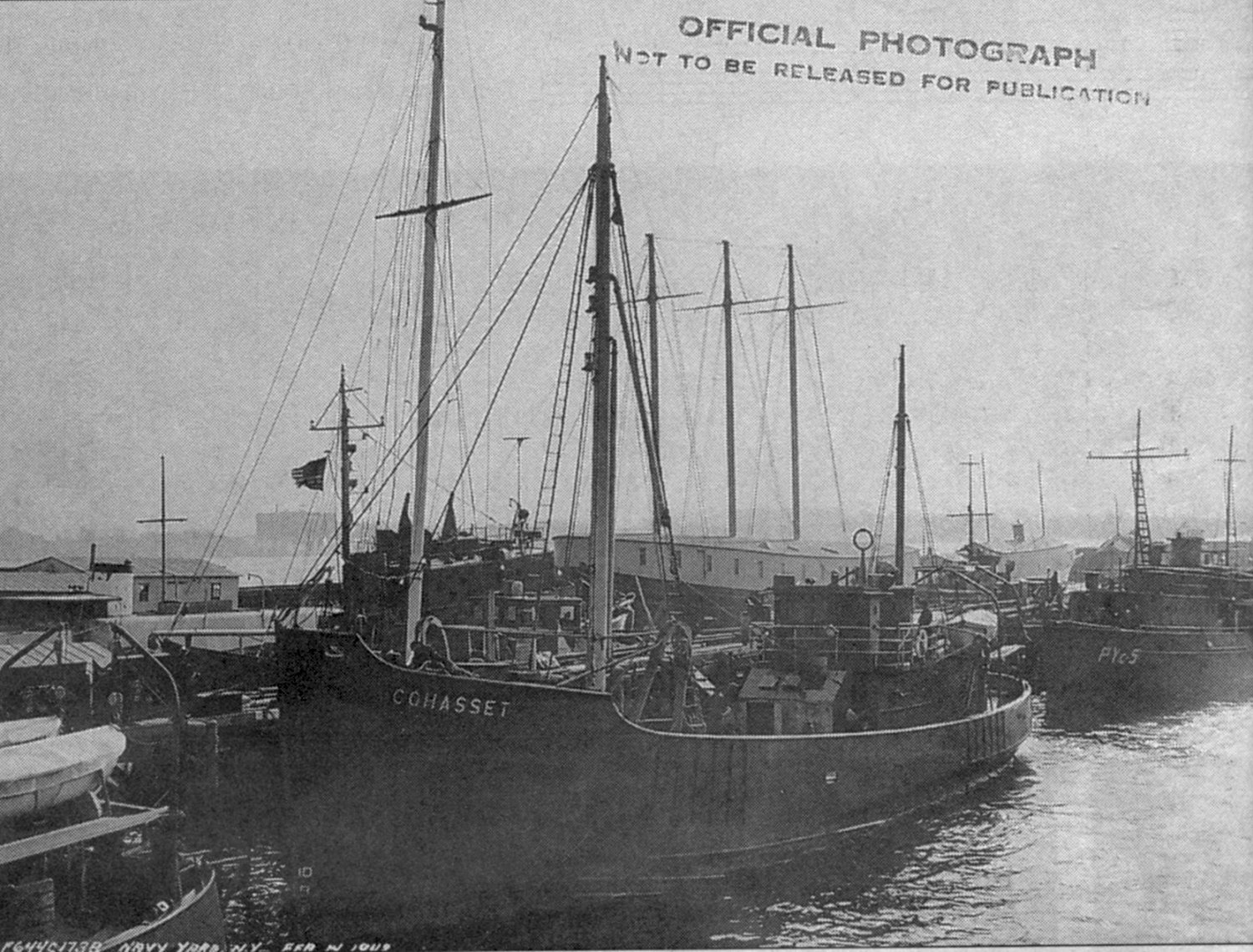
- USS Onyx (PYc-5) astern of Cohasset

History

United States
- Name: USS Onyx
- Namesake: Onyx
- Builder: Consolidated Shipbuilding Corp., Morris Heights, New York
- Launched: 1924
- Acquired: by purchase, 3 December 1940
- Commissioned: 27 February 1941
- Decommissioned: 15 May 1944
- In service: 15 May 1944
- Out of service: 1 February 1945
- Stricken: 5 February 1945
- Fate: Returned to War Shipping Administration, 2 February 1945

General characteristics
- Type: Coastal Patrol Yacht
- Displacement: 190 long tons (193 t)
- Length: 118 ft 7 in (36.14 m)
- Beam: 21 ft 6 in (6.55 m)
- Draft: 8 ft (2.4 m)
- Speed: 12 knots (22 km/h; 14 mph)
- Armament: 1 × 3"/50 caliber gun; 6 × .30 cal (7.62 mm) machine guns; 2 × Depth charge tracks

USS Onyx (PYc-5), was a diesel coastal patrol yacht of the United States Navy during World War II.

The ship was built in 1924 as Janey III by Consolidated Shipbuilding Corp. of Morris Heights, New York, and was subsequently renamed Rene and Pegasus.

Purchased by the Navy on 3 December 1940 from Clifford C. Hemphill, of New York City, converted to Navy use and named Onyx, she was classified as a coastal yacht on 13 December 1940, and commissioned on 27 February 1941.

== Service history ==
After conversion she departed New York for Norfolk, arriving on 22 March. Sailing again, she reached New Orleans on 5 April to report for duty to Commandant 8th Naval District. Onyx performed services for ComEight as a coastal patrol vessel around the Gulf area until January 1942. On 22 January she departed Key West, Florida to return to New York and arrived there on 31 January.

Onyx was again ordered to report to the 8th Naval District at New Orleans and was underway by 13 March, arriving on 27 March. She resumed services and continued in this capacity until February 1944 when she was extensively damaged in a collision. Beyond economic repair, her ordnance was removed and she was placed out of commission, in service, retaining her name and designation, on 15 May 1944. She was designated a target vessel on 31 May, the same year, and made available for disposition on 31 October.

Considered for conversion to a fuel barge in November, her conversion never materialized and Onyx was placed out of service on 1 February 1945 and returned to War Shipping Administration on 2 February. She was struck from the U.S. Naval Vessel Register on 5 February 1945.
