= SS Presidente Trujillo =

Dominican-owned cargo ship sunk in World War II

History
- Name: Gouverneur Jaeschke (1900–1917); Watauga (1917–1920); Guantanamo (1920–1933); Presidente Trujillo (1933–1942)
- Owner: 1900: Hamburg America Line; 1917: US Shipping Board; 1920: Empresa Naviera de Cuba; 1933: Cia Naviera Dominicana
- Port of registry: 1900: (German Empire) Hamburg; 1917: (United States) San Francisco; 1920: (Cuba) Havana; 1933: (Dominican Republic) Ciudad Trujillo
- Builder: Howaldtswerke, Kiel
- Yard number: 373
- Launched: 12 October 1900
- Completed: December 1900
- Identification: 1900 code letters LMRC; 1917: US official number 215609; 1917: code letters LHVF; by 1934: call sign HIFS
- Fate: sunk by torpedo, 21 May 1942

General characteristics
- Type: cargo ship
- Tonnage: 1,668 GRT, 917 NRT
- Length: 240.4 ft (73.3 m)
- Beam: 36.0 ft (11.0 m)
- Depth: 20.9 ft (6.4 m)
- Decks: 1
- Installed power: 1 × triple-expansion engine: 204 NHP
- Propulsion: 1 × screw
- Speed: 11 knots (20 km/h)
- Crew: 39
- Armament: 1 x 75mm deck gun; 3 x AA machine guns

SS Presidente Trujillo was a cargo steamship that was torpedoed by U-156 in the Caribbean Sea off Fort-de-France, Martinique on 21 May 1942 while she was travelling from Fort-de-France to San Juan, Puerto Rico carrying a cargo of beer, machinery and forage.

== Building ==
The ship was built by Howaldtswerke in Kiel, Germany as yard number 373. She was launched on 12 October 1900 as Gouvereur Jaeschke, and completed that December. Her registered length was 240.4 ft (73.3 m); her beam was 36.0 ft (11.0 m); and her depth was 20.9 ft (6.4 m). Her tonnages were 1,668 GRT and 917 NRT. She had a single screw, driven by a three-cylinder quadruple-expansion engine that was rated at 204 NHP, and gave her a speed of 11 knots (20 km/h). By 1942, she was defensively armed with a 75 mm deck gun and three AA machine guns.

== Sinking ==
Presidente Trujillo was steaming unescorted from Fort-de-France to San Juan, carrying a general cargo of beer, machinery and forage, when on 21 May 1942 at 18:29 hrs, she was hit aft by a G7e torpedo from U-156 in the Caribbean Sea off Fort-de-France, at position 14°38′N 61°11′W. She sank in four minutes, killing 24 members of her crew. The 15 survivors were rescued soon after.
