= SS Angarstroy =

Cargo ship

History
- Name: SS Grantleyhall; SS Angarstroy
- Owner: West Hartlepool Steam Navigation Co. Ltd., West Hartlepool; Sovtorgflot
- Port of registry: United Kingdom West Hartlepool; Soviet Union
- Builder: Harland and Wolff, Belfast
- Launched: 16 June 1927
- Acquired: 1931
- Identification: Code Letters UOWK
- Fate: Torpedoed and sunk, 1 May 1942

General characteristics
- Tonnage: 4,761 GRT
- Length: 412 ft 3 in (125.65 m)
- Depth: 25 ft (7.6 m)
- Installed power: Triple expansion steam engine
- Crew: 46 crew and 14 passengers

SS Angarstroy or Angastroi was a cargo ship built by Harland and Wolff shipyards, Belfast in 1927. Originally named Grantleyhall, the ship had a length of 412 ft 3 in (125.65 m) and a depth of 25 ft (7.6 m). Her gross register tonnage (GRT) was 4,761.

Grantleyhall was acquired by Soviet shipping company Sovtorgflot in 1931 and was put into use by the Soviet government after Operation Barbarossa in 1941. On 27 April 1942, whilst sailing under the name Angarstroy 130 miles off the Japanese coast, a Japanese warship intercepted her and forced her crew to proceed to the nearest Japanese port.

After examination, Angarstroy was released, sailing on a course given to the crew by the Japanese. On 1 May, she was struck by two torpedoes in the East China Sea and sank. The 60 crew and passengers on board were picked up by two nearby Japanese submarines and taken to a Soviet steamer in the area. On 27 June, Radio Moscow reported the sinking of the cargo ship, announcing that the Japanese "have produced a version to the effect that the sinking was the work of not a Japanese but of an American submarine. The crew of the Angastroi state that this version can not be substantiated because circumstances of the sinking of the Soviet steamer show that it was sunk by a Japanese submarine."
