= List of Congressional Gold Medal recipients =

Below is a list of recipients of the Congressional Gold Medal, the highest civilian honor bestowed by the United States Congress.

== Recipients of Continental Congress Gold Medals ==
Recipient(s)	Date of approval	Public law	Notes	Medal
George Washington	March 25, 1776	Continental Congress	Awarded to Washington "and the officers and soldiers under his command" in honor of the liberation of Boston, first major city liberated from British occupation. Later led the Continental Army to victory in the American Revolutionary War (1775–1783). Presented to Washington March 21, 1790 and currently resides at the Boston Public Library. See also: Washington Before Boston Medal	
Major General Horatio Gates	November 4, 1777	Continental Congress	Victor in Saratoga campaign. The medal is currently in the possession of the New York Historical Society.	
Major General Anthony Wayne	July 26, 1779	Continental Congress	Commander at the Battle of Stony Point. The medal is currently in the possession of the Pennsylvania Society of Sons of the Revolution.	
Major Henry "Light Horse Harry" Lee	September 24, 1779	Continental Congress	Commander at the Battle of Paulus Hook. Only non-general to receive a gold medal during the American Revolutionary War	
Brigadier General Daniel Morgan	March 9, 1781	Continental Congress	Commander at the Battle of Cowpens. In 1836 Congress (5 Stat. 66) authorized a duplicate be struck to replace the lost original, and be presented to Morgan Neville, his lineal heir	
Major General Nathanael Greene	October 29, 1781	Continental Congress	Commander at the Battle of Eutaw Springs	
Captain John Paul Jones	October 16, 1787	Continental Congress	"For his 'valor and brilliant services' during the Battle of Flamborough Head eight years earlier. Jones became the first and only Continental Navy officer to receive this distinction for his service during the American Revolution."	

== Recipients of Congressional Gold Medals ==
Recipient(s)		Date of approval	Public law	Notes	Medal
	Captain Thomas Truxtun	March 29, 1800	2 Stat. 87	Commander of the USS Constellation during the battle against the French frigate La Vengeance	
	Commodore Edward Preble	March 3, 1805	2 Stat. 346–347	For 1804 attacks on Tripoli during the First Barbary War	
	Captain Isaac Hull; Captain Stephen Decatur; Captain Jacob Jones	January 29, 1813	2 Stat. 830	For action against the Guerriere, Macedonian, and Frolic during the War of 1812. Silver duplicates awarded to their commissioned officers on board.	
	Captain William Bainbridge	March 3, 1813	2 Stat. 831	Commander of the USS Constitution during her capture of HMS Java. Silver duplicates awarded to his commissioned officers on board. The medal is currently possessed by the USS Constitution Museum.	
	Captain Oliver Hazard Perry; Captain Jesse D. Elliott	January 6, 1814	3 Stat. 141	Victors of the Battle of Lake Erie. Silver medals authorized for their commissioned officers on board.	
	Lieutenant William W. Burrows II and Lieutenant Edward McCall	January 6, 1814	3 Stat. 141–142	For capture of HMS Boxer; awarded posthumously to Burrows, who was killed in action. Silver duplicates awarded to his commissioned officers on board.	
	Captain James Lawrence	January 11, 1814	3 Stat. 142	Awarded posthumously for capture of HMS Peacock. Silver medals awarded to his commissioned officers on board.	
	Captain Thomas Macdonough; Captain Robert Henley; Lieutenant Stephen Cassin	October 20, 1814	3 Stat. 245–246	Heroes of Battle of Plattsburgh	
	Captain Lewis Warrington	October 21, 1814	3 Stat. 246	For capture of HMS Epervier. Silver duplicates awarded to his commissioned officers on board.	
	Captain Johnston Blakeley	November 3, 1814	3 Stat. 246–247	For capture of HMS Reindeer. Silver duplicates awarded to his commissioned officers on board.	
	Major General Jacob Brown	November 3, 1814	3 Stat. 247	Commander at the Battles of Chippawa, Niagara, and Erie	
	Major General Winfield Scott	November 3, 1814; March 9, 1848	3 Stat. 247; 9 Stat. 333	For actions at the battles of Chippawa and Niagara (War of 1812); For actions during the Siege of Veracruz (Mexican–American War)	
	Major General Peter Buell Porter; Brigadier General Eleazar Ripley; Colonel James Miller	November 3, 1814	3 Stat. 247	For their actions at the battles of Chippawa, Niagara, and Erie	
	Major General Edmund P. Gaines	November 3, 1814	3 Stat. 247	For his actions on 15 August 1814 at the Battle of Erie (now known as the Siege of Fort Erie)	
	Major General Alexander Macomb	November 3, 1814	3 Stat. 247	For his actions on 11 September 1814 at The Battle of Plattsburgh	
	Major General Andrew Jackson	February 27, 1815	3 Stat. 249	For the defense of New Orleans in the War of 1812	
	Captain Charles Stewart	February 22, 1816	3 Stat. 341	For the capture of HMS Cyane and HMS Levant. Silver medals awarded to his commissioned officers on board.	
	Captain James Biddle	February 22, 1816	3 Stat. 341	For the capture of HMS Penguin. Silver medals awarded to his commissioned officers on board.	
	Major General William Henry Harrison and Governor Isaac Shelby	April 4, 1818	3 Stat. 476	Victors of the Battle of the Thames	
	Colonel George Croghan	February 13, 1835	4 Stat. 792	For the defense of Fort Stephenson	
	Major General Zachary Taylor	July 16, 1846; March 2, 1847; May 9, 1848	9 Stat. 111; 9 Stat. 206; 9 Stat. 334–335	For distinguished achievements during military operations along the Rio Grande; For meritorious achievements at the Battle of Monterrey; For valor at the Battle of Buena Vista; Only individual to be awarded three times, all for his Mexican–American War accomplishments	
	Rescuers of the Officers and Crew of the U.S. Brig Somers	March 3, 1847	9 Stat. 208	Awarded to officers and men of French, British, and Spanish ships who rescued officers and men of the Somers during the Mexican–American War.	
	Commander Duncan Ingraham	August 4, 1854	10 Stat. 594–595	For his role in the Koszta Affair	
	Frederick Rose (surgeon)	May 11, 1858	11 Stat. 369	For caring for, and traveling with, the sailors on his ship suffering from yellow fever.	
	Major General Ulysses S. Grant	December 17, 1863	13 Stat. 399	For gallantry and good conduct of himself and his troops in battles of the rebellion. The medal is currently possessed by the Smithsonian.	
	Cornelius Vanderbilt	January 28, 1864	13 Stat. 401	For donating his steamship Vanderbilt to the Union. The medal was donated to Vanderbilt University by Cornelius Vanderbilt's great-great-great grandson William H. Vanderbilt IV in 2022.	
	Captain Robert Creighton; Captain Edwin J. Low; Captain George C. Stouffer	July 26, 1866	14 Stat. 365–366	For rescuing "about 500" Americans from the wreck of the steamship San Francisco	
	Cyrus West Field	March 2, 1867	14 Stat. 574	For establishing the first Transatlantic telegraph cable	
	George Peabody	March 16, 1867	15 Stat. 20	For giving $2,000,000 for the promotion of education in the more destitute portions of the southern and southwestern States.	
	George F. Robinson	March 1, 1871	16 Stat. 704	For actions to protect William H. Seward during an assassination attempt and save his life afterwards.	
	Captain Jared Crandall and Others	February 24, 1873	17 Stat. 638	For rescue operations involving the steamer Metis. Statute does not specifically call for gold medals to the ten individuals cited (including Crandall), instead leaves it to the discretion of the President. Unclear if any were gold.	
	John Horn Jr.	June 20, 1874; April 28, 1904	18 Stat. 573; 33 Stat. 1684–1685	Noted lifesaver. 1904 medal was a re-issue of the earlier award, which Horn claimed had been stolen. Customarily, the Secretary of the Treasury had issued duplicate medals upon the submission of absolute proof that showed the originals had been irrecoverably lost or destroyed. Since such proof was absent in Horn's case, congressional approval was necessary before the medal could be replaced.	
John Fox Slater	John Fox Slater	February 5, 1883	22 Stat. 636	United States philanthropist known for assisting in the education of emancipated African American slaves.	
Joseph Francis	Joseph Francis	August 27, 1888	25 Stat. 1249	Inventor of life-saving tools. The medal is currently possessed by the Smithsonian.	
	Chief Engineer George Wallace Melville and Others	September 30, 1890	26 Stat. 552–553	To commemorate the perils encountered during the Jeannette Expedition. 8 gold and 25 silver medals were struck, in decoration form, suspended from a ribbon.	
	First Lieutenant Frank H. Newcomb	May 3, 1900	31 Stat. 716	For heroism as commanding officer of USRC Hudson during the Battle of Cardenas, 1898. The officers and men of Hudson received silver and bronze versions of the gold medal.	
	First Lieutenant David H. Jarvis, Second Lieutenant Ellsworth P. Bertholf and Dr. Samuel J. Call	June 28, 1902	32 Stat. 492	Participants in the Overland Relief Expedition of 1897–98	
	Orville and Wilbur Wright	March 4, 1909	35 Stat. 1627	In recognition of their invention of the airplane and contributions to aerial navigation.	
	Captain Arthur Henry Rostron	July 6, 1912	37 Stat. 639	Captain of the RMS Carpathia who rescued the survivors of the sunken RMS Titanic at considerable risk to his own ship.	
	Captain Paul H. Kreibohm and others	March 19, 1914	38 Stat. 769	For participation in the rescue of passengers and crew of the SS Volturno	
	Domício da Gama, Rómulo Sebastián Naón, and Eduardo Suárez Mujica	March 4, 1915	38 Stat. 1228	In recognition of the valuable services of these distinguished statesmen as mediators in the controversy between the government of the United States of America and the leaders of the warring parties in the Republic of Mexico.	
	Charles Lindbergh	May 4, 1928	45 Stat. 490	In recognition of his contributions to aerial navigation by flying solo non-stop from New York to Paris.	
	Lincoln Ellsworth, Roald Amundsen, and Umberto Nobile	May 29, 1928	45 Stat. 2026–2027	In recognition of their contributions to polar exploration.	
	Thomas Edison	May 29, 1928	45 Stat. 1012	For development and application of inventions that revolutionized civilizations.	
	First Successful Trans-Atlantic Flight	February 9, 1929	45 Stat. 1158	See also: NC-4 Medal	
	Major Walter Reed and Associates for Yellow Fever Experimentations in Cuba	February 28, 1929	45 Stat. 1409–1410	For contributions to discovering the transmission of Yellow fever from mosquitos. See also: Walter Reed Medal	
	Officers and Men of the Byrd Antarctic Expedition	May 23, 1930	46 Stat. 379	81 people connected with the expedition were awarded the Byrd Antarctic Expedition Medal: 65 were awarded gold, seven received silver medals, and nine received bronze.	
	Lincoln Ellsworth	June 16, 1936	49 Stat. 2324	To recognize exploration that led to U.S. claims to 350,000 square miles in Antarctica, and for his 2,500-mile aerial survey of Antarctica's interior	
	George Cohan	June 29, 1936	49 Stat. 2371	For contributions to American musical culture through authoring and popularizing patriotic songs in wartime.	
	Mrs. Richard Aldrich and Anna Bouligny	June 20, 1938	52 Stat. 1365	"Gold medals were given to Mrs. Richard Aldrich and Anna Bouligny some four decades after they served wounded soldiers in Puerto Rico. As part of their 'outstanding, unselfish, and wholly voluntary service,' they set up and worked in hospitals 'for the care and treatment of military patients in Puerto Rico' during the War with Spain. Mrs. Aldrich and Ms. Bouligny 'voluntarily went to Puerto Rico and there rendered service of inestimable value to the Army of the United States in the establishment and operation of hospitals.'" May have been the first women awarded this medal.	
	Howard Hughes	August 7, 1939	53 Stat. 1525	For advancing the science of aviation	
	Reverend Francis X. Quinn	August 10, 1939	53 Stat. 1533	Pastor of the Church of the Guardian Angel in New York City. Honored for risking his life in persuading a gunman holding an elderly couple hostage to surrender to police.	
	William Sinnott	June 15, 1940	54 Stat. 1283	In recognition of his actions to protect President-elect Franklin D. Roosevelt during a February 1933 assassination attempt	
	Roland L. Boucher	January 20, 1942	56 Stat. 1099–1100	11-year-old Roland L. Boucher (1929–1978) of Burlington, Vermont made national headlines in February 1941 when he saved five playmates who fell through the ice of Lake Champlain. (One died while being treated after being pulled from the water.) No one else of his age had been awarded the Congressional Gold Medal until the young victims of the 16th Street Baptist church bombing were honored in 2013.	
	Members of the United States Antarctic Expedition of 1939–1941	September 24, 1945	P.L. 79-185, 59 Stat. 536	"The Secretary of the Navy is authorized and directed to cause to be made at the United States mint such number of gold, silver, and bronze medals of appropriate design as he may deem appropriate and necessary, to be presented to members of the United States Antarctic Expedition of 1939–1941, in recognition of their valuable services to the Nation in the field of polar exploration and science." — P.L. 79-185 (Note: It is unclear if the gold version is considered a Congressional Gold Medal, as this award is not listed on the artandhistory.house.gov webpage for recipients, nor is it listed in the Congressional Research Service report (see "Sources"). Compare to 1930 awards of 1st Byrd Expedition.) See also: United States Antarctic Expedition Medal	
	George Catlett Marshall, General of the Army, and Fleet Admiral Ernest Joseph King	March 22, 1946	60 Stat. 1134–1135	In recognition of their leadership in developing the U.S. strategy for fighting in World War II, overseeing the expansion of the Army and Navy to carry it out, and successfully implementing it	
	John J. Pershing, General of the Armies of the United States	August 7, 1946	60 Stat. 1297–1298	For heroic achievements as commander of the American Expeditionary Forces during World War I	
	Brigadier General Billy Mitchell	August 8, 1946	60 Stat. 1319	To recognize his foresight and service to military aviation	
	Vice President Alben W. Barkley	August 12, 1949	P.L. 81-221, 63 Stat. 599	For his distinguished public service and outstanding contribution to improving the country's general welfare	
	Irving Berlin	July 16, 1954	P.L. 83-536, 68 Stat. A120	For contributions to American musical culture services by composing wartime patriotic songs including "God Bless America"	
	Doctor Jonas Salk	August 9, 1955	P.L. 84-297, 69 Stat. 589	In recognition of his discovery of a serum for the prevention of poliomyelitis	
	Surviving Veterans of the American Civil War	July 18, 1956	P.L. 84-730, 70 Stat. 577	"This medal was awarded about 90 years after the Civil War ended. At the time, there were only four veterans of that war known to still be alive. The medal honored the last surviving veterans 'who served in the Union or the Confederate forces.'"	
	Rear Admiral Hyman Rickover	August 28, 1958	P.L. 85-826, 72 Stat. 985	"In recognition of successfully directing the development and construction of the world's first nuclear-powered ships and the first large-scale nuclear power reactor devoted exclusively to the production of electricity" — P.L. 85-826	
	Doctor Robert Goddard	September 16, 1959	P.L. 86-277, 73 Stat. 562–563	"In recognition of his pioneering research on space rockets, missiles, and jet propulsion" (awarded posthumously) — P.L. 86-277	
	Robert Frost	September 13, 1960	P.L. 86-747, 74 Stat. 883	"In recognition of his poetry, which enriched the culture of the United States and the philosophy of the world." — P.L. 86-747	
	Doctor Thomas Anthony Dooley III	May 27, 1961	P.L. 87-42, 75 Stat. 87	For his service in meeting the medical needs of the people of Laos and other developing countries.	
	Bob Hope	June 8, 1962	P.L. 87-478, 76 Stat. 93	For his contributions to entertainment and culture, and the service he rendered his country through his efforts with the United Service Organizations.	
Sam Rayburn	Sam Rayburn, Speaker of the House of Representatives	September 26, 1962	P.L. 87-478, 76 Stat. 605	To acknowledge the accomplishments of his many years in public service.	
	Douglas MacArthur, General of the Army	October 9, 1962	P.L. 87-760, 76 Stat. 760	In recognition of the gallant service he rendered throughout his military career.	
	Walt Disney	May 24, 1968	P.L. 90-316, 82 Stat. 130–131	For outstanding contributions to the entertainment industry, which benefited United States and world culture.	
	Sir Winston Churchill	May 7, 1969	P.L. 91-12, 83 Stat. 8–9	In honor of the dedication of the Winston Churchill Memorial and Library at Westminster College in Fulton, Missouri. To be presented to the widow of Sir Winston, with the marred (to prevent duplication) die donated to the museum for display purposes.	
	Roberto Clemente	May 14, 1973	P.L. 93-33, 87 Stat. 71	The United States has honored several famous sports figures with Congressional Gold Medals among them baseball Hall of Famer Roberto Clemente, a native of Puerto Rico.	
	Marian Anderson	March 8, 1977	P.L. 95-9, 91 Stat. 19	"Marian Anderson was a world-famous singer who was often treated unfairly. The medal honors her 'highly distinguished and impressive career.' She helped the arts to advance in this country and throughout the world, helped world peace through her performances, her recordings, and her work as United States delegate to the United Nations."	
	Lieutenant General Ira Eaker	October 10, 1978	P.L. 95-438, 92 Stat. 1060	To commemorate his distinguished career as an aviation pioneer and Air Force leader.	
	Robert F. Kennedy	November 1, 1978	P.L. 95-560, 92 Stat. 2142	For distinguished and dedicated service to the people of the United States during his career in government.	
	John Wayne	May 26, 1979	P.L. 96-15, 93 Stat. 32	In recognition of his distinguished career as an actor and his service to the Nation.--PL 96-15	
	Ben Abruzzo, Maxie Anderson, and Larry Newman	June 13, 1979	P.L. 96-20, 93 Stat. 45	Awarded for the first manned balloon crossing of the Atlantic ocean in the Double Eagle II	
	Hubert Humphrey	June 13, 1979	P.L. 96-91, 93 Stat. 46	Presented to Mrs. Hubert H. Humphrey, "in recognition of the distinguished and dedicated service which her late husband gave to the Government and to the people of the United States."	
	American Red Cross	December 12, 1979	P.L. 96-138, 93 Stat. 1063	In recognition of its unselfish and humanitarian service to the people of the United States.	
	Canadian Ambassador Kenneth D. Taylor OC	March 6, 1980	P.L. 96-201, 94 Stat. 79	Canadian Ambassador to Iran who was instrumental in the rescue of American diplomatic staff during the Iran Hostage Crisis, this event became commonly known as the Canadian Caper; he is also a recipient of the Order of Canada.	
	Simon Wiesenthal	March 17, 1980	P.L. 96-211, 94 Stat. 101	Presented in "recognition of his contribution to international justice through the documentation and location of war criminals from World War II."	
	1980 US Summer Olympic Team	July 8, 1980	P.L. 96-306 94 Stat. 937	To recognize the athletes of the 1980 US Summer Olympic team, who forfeited the Moscow games due to the United States boycott to protest the Soviet invasion of Afghanistan. Because of the high volume of medals needed, Congress authorized the U.S. Mint to forge gold-plated medals in lieu of standard solid gold medals. The medals' status as official Congressional Gold Medals was unclear until confirmed by the Clerk of the House of Representatives in 2007.	
	Queen Beatrix of the Netherlands	March 22, 1982	P.L. 97-158, 96 Stat. 18–19	In recognition of the 1982 bicentennial anniversary of diplomatic and trade relations between the Netherlands and the United States.	
	Admiral Hyman Rickover (second time)	June 23, 1982	P.L. 97-201, 96 Stat. 126–127	For his world-renowned contributions to the development of nuclear energy and the defense of the United States.	
	Fred Waring	August 26, 1982	P.L. 97-246, 96 Stat. 315–316	In recognition of his contribution to enriching American life.	
	Joe Louis	August 26, 1982	P.L. 97-246, 96 Stat. 315–316	In recognition of his boxing career, which bolstered the spirit of the American people during the Great Depression and World War II.	
	Louis L'Amour	August 26, 1982	P.L. 97-246, 96 Stat. 315–316	To acknowledge his distinguished career as an author and his contributions to the Nation through his historically based works	
	Leo Ryan	November 18, 1983	P.L. 98-159, 97 Stat. 992	On November 18, 1978, Congressman Ryan was murdered in Guyana while on a mission to investigate allegations of abuse at an American camp of cult leader Jim Jones. He was awarded the medal posthumously five years later. Ryan is the only U.S. Member of Congress killed in the line of duty.	
	Danny Thomas	November 29, 1983	P.L. 98-172, 97 Stat. 1119–1120	To recognize his lifetime of humanitarian and charitable works.	
	Harry S. Truman	May 8, 1984	P.L. 98-278, 98 Stat. 173–175	In recognition of the lifetime of outstanding public service.	
	Lady Bird Johnson	May 8, 1984	P.L. 98-278, 98 Stat. 173–175	In recognition of her conservation and beautification efforts, including the Highway Beautification Act.	
	Elie Wiesel	May 8, 1984	P.L. 98-278, 98 Stat. 173–175	For humanitarian leadership in documenting and preserving the memory of The Holocaust.	
	Roy Wilkins	May 17, 1984	P.L. 98-285, 98 Stat. 186	For his incomparable contribution to the struggle for civil rights and equality.	
	George Gershwin and Ira Gershwin	August 9, 1985	P.L. 99-86, 99 Stat. 288–289	In recognition of their contributions to American music, theater, and culture.	
	Natan Sharansky and Avital Sharansky	May 13, 1986	P.L. 99-298, 100 Stat. 432–433	In recognition of their work to advance religious liberty and human rights.	
	Harry Chapin	May 20, 1986	P.L. 99-311, 100 Stat. 464	To recognize his efforts to alleviate world hunger.	
	Aaron Copland	September 23, 1986	Pub. L. 99–418, Stat. 952–953	For incomparable contributions to American musical composition.	
	Mary Lasker	December 24, 1987	Pub. L. 100–210, 101 Stat. 1441	To recognize her work to encourage medical research and raise public awareness of killing and crippling diseases.	
	Jesse Owens	September 20, 1988	Pub. L. 100–437, 102 Stat. 1717	In recognition of the late Jesse Owens' athletic achievements and humanitarian contributions to public service, civil rights, and international goodwill.--PL 100-437 (awarded posthumously)	
	Andrew Wyeth	November 9, 1988	Pub. L. 100–639, 102 Stat. 3331–3332	In recognition of outstanding and invaluable contributions to American art and culture.	
	Laurance Rockefeller	May 17, 1990	Pub. L. 101–296, 104 Stat. 197–199	For contributions to environmental conservation and historic preservation.	
	General Matthew Ridgway	November 5, 1990	Pub. L. 101–510, 104 Stat. 1720–1721	For serving with honor and distinction during a military career of more than 40 years.	
	General H. Norman Schwarzkopf	April 23, 1991	Pub. L. 102–32, 105 Stat. 175–176	In recognition of his exemplary performance in coordinating the US and allied combat action that liberated Kuwait.	
	General Colin Powell	April 23, 1991	Pub. L. 102–33, 105 Stat. 177–178	In recognition of his exemplary performance in planning and coordinating the US military response to the Iraqi invasion of Kuwait.	
	The Lubavitcher Rebbe, Rabbi Menachem Mendel Schneerson	November 2, 1994	Pub. L. 103–457, 108 Stat. 4799–4800	In recognition of his outstanding and enduring contributions toward world education, morality, and acts of charity.--PL 103-457	
	Ruth Graham and Billy Graham	February 13, 1996	Pub. L. 104–111 (text) (PDF), 110 Stat. 772–773	For lasting contributions to racial equality, philanthropy, and religion.	
	Frank Sinatra	May 14, 1997	Pub. L. 105–14 (text) (PDF), 111 Stat. 32–33	In recognition of his outstanding and enduring contributions through his entertainment career and numerous humanitarian activities.--PL 105-14	
	Mother Teresa	June 2, 1997	Pub. L. 105–16 (text) (PDF), 111 Stat. 35–36	To recognize her outstanding humanitarian and charitable activities.	
	Ecumenical Patriarch Bartholomew I	October 6, 1997	Pub. L. 105–51 (text) (PDF), 111 Stat. 117-1171	In recognition of his outstanding and enduring contributions to peace and religious understanding.	
	Nelson Mandela	July 29, 1998	Pub. L. 105–215 (text) (PDF), 112 Stat. 895–896	For dedication to the abolition of apartheid promotion of reconciliation among the people of South Africa.	
	Little Rock Nine	October 21, 1998	Pub. L. 105–277 (text) (PDF), 112 Stat. 2681-597	"To Jean Brown Trickey, Carlotta Walls LaNier, Melba Patillo Beals, Terrence Roberts, Gloria Ray Karlmark, Thelma Mothershed Wair, Ernest Green, Elizabeth Eckford, and Jefferson Thoma...in recognition of the selfless heroism such individuals exhibited and the pain they suffered in the cause of civil rights by integrating Central High School in Little Rock, Arkansas." — P.L. 105-277	
	Gerald Ford and Betty Ford	October 21, 1998	Pub. L. 105–277 (text) (PDF), 112 Stat. 2681-598	"In recognition of their dedicated public service and outstanding humanitarian contributions to the people of the United States." — P.L. 105-277	
	Rosa Parks	May 4, 1999	Pub. L. 106–26 (text) (PDF), 113 Stat. 50–51	Parks defied unjust racial segregation laws on a public transit bus and thus sparked the Montgomery bus boycott, an early victory of the American Civil Rights Movement.	
	Theodore Hesburgh	December 9, 1999	Pub. L. 106–153 (text) (PDF), 113 Stat. 1733–1734	For his outstanding and enduring contributions to civil rights, higher education, and the Catholic Church.	
	John Joseph O'Connor	March 3, 2000	Pub. L. 106–175 (text) (PDF), 114 Stat. 20–21	"To John Cardinal O'Connor, Archbishop of New York, in recognition of his accomplishments as a priest, a chaplain, and a humanitarian." — P.L. 106-175	
	Charles Schulz	June 20, 2000	Pub. L. 106–225 (text) (PDF), 114 Stat. 457–458	"Our country owes Charles Schulz a great deal. His comic art has changed American culture and brightened the lives of millions of Americans. This ceremony today offers one tangible way for our country to express thanks to a truly great American." — United States Senator Dianne Feinstein, sponsor of the bill.	
	Pope John Paul II	July 27, 2000	Pub. L. 106–250 (text) (PDF), 114 Stat. 622–623	Speaker of the House of Representatives Dennis Hastert and Representative John Joseph Moakley led a delegation from the U.S. Congress to bring Pope John Paul II the Congressional Gold Medal on January 8, 2001.	
	Ronald Reagan and Nancy Reagan	July 27, 2000	Pub. L. 106–251 (text) (PDF), 114 Stat. 624–625	"I am sure that each and every one of you have your own special memory of Ronald and Nancy Reagan. I know I do. Many Americans remember how the Reagan's [sic] sparked a renewal of hope and optimism in a nation that was beginning to lose faith in the American dream. This renewed patriotism will always remain one of their most enduring legacies. Ronald and Nancy Reagan shared a remarkable grace, a rare charm that set both the American public and world leaders at ease." — U.S. Rep. Jim Gibbons, Republican of Nevada, statement made at award ceremony at Rotunda on Capitol Hill.	
	Navajo Code Talkers	December 21, 2000	Pub. L. 106–554 (text) (PDF), 114 Stat. 2763	"Today, we marked a moment of shared history and shared victory. We recall a story that all Americans can celebrate and every America should know. It is a story of ancient people called to serve in a modern war. It is a story of one unbreakable oral code of the Second World War, messages traveling by field radio on Iwo Jima in the very language heard across the Colorado plateau centuries ago." — statement by President George W. Bush when presenting the award on July 26, 2001, at the Capitol Rotunda to four of the five living original 29 American Navajo code talkers, and relatives of the 24 others. A gold medal was authorized for each of the original 29 Navajo code talkers or a surviving family member. Silver medals were authorized for anyone who qualified as a Navajo code talker (300+), or a surviving family member.	
	General Hugh Shelton	January 16, 2002	Pub. L. 107–127 (text) (PDF), 115 Stat. 2405–2406	"Throughout his 38 years of service to his country, his ascent through the ranks of the Army, two tours in Vietnam and duty in Operation Desert Storm, Gen. Shelton has carried with him the North Carolina values of service, sacrifice, love of family, faith in God and devotion to country." — U.S. Rep. Bob Etheridge, who helped write the legislation honoring Shelton.	
	British Prime Minister Tony Blair	July 18, 2003	Pub. L. 108–60 (text) (PDF), 117, Stat. 862–863	"America has many allies, but as we have seen in recent months, we can count on Great Britain to fulfill the duties of a true friend in tough times. I applaud Tony Blair's extraordinary leadership and his continued support of the United States." — U.S. Rep. Ginny Brown-Waite, sponsor of the bill in the United States House of Representatives.	(Note: It is unclear if the medal was ever struck, or if Blair ever received it.)
	Jackie Robinson	October 29, 2003	Pub. L. 108–101 (text) (PDF), 117 Stat. 1195–1197	"His story is one that shows what one person can do to hold America to account to its founding promise of freedom and equality. It's a lesson for people coming up to see. One person can make a big difference in setting the tone of this country." — President George W. Bush, on presenting the award to Robinson's widow Rachel Robinson.	
	Dr. Dorothy Height	December 6, 2003	Pub. L. 108–162 (text) (PDF), 117 Stat. 2017	"She's a woman of enormous accomplishment. She's a friend of first ladies like Eleanor Roosevelt, Hillary Rodham Clinton. She's known every president since Dwight David Eisenhower. She's told every president what she thinks since Dwight David Eisenhower. Truth of the matter is, she was the giant of the civil rights movement." — President George W. Bush, on presenting Height with the award.	
	Joseph A. DeLaine, Harry & Eliza Briggs, and Levi Pearson	December 15, 2003	Pub. L. 108–180 (text) (PDF), 117 Stat. 2645–2647	The four filed lawsuits in South Carolina which helped lead to Brown v. Board of Education. "These were ordinary citizens who did an extraordinary thing. Their courage and commitment to fight for a better education for their children in Clarendon County, South Carolina, has benefited generations of children nationwide." — Jim Clyburn, Democratic Congressman, helped push the legislation through along with Democratic Senator Ernest Hollings, both of South Carolina.	
	Dr. Martin Luther King Jr. and Coretta Scott King	October 25, 2004	Pub. L. 108–368 (text) (PDF), 118 Stat. 1746–1748	"Dr. King had a dream of peace and equality and dedicated his life to achieving that dream. Throughout his brief but remarkable life, Dr. King stood for the causes of freedom, justice and equality." — Carl Levin, Democratic Senator from Michigan, pushed through bill in United States Senate.	
	Tuskegee Airmen	April 11, 2006	Pub. L. 109–213 (text) (PDF), 120 Stat. 322–325	"The Tuskegee Airmen were a group of 994 African American pilots who gained fame during WWII for their heroism escorting American bombers in raids over Europe and North Africa. Their distinguished service is credited with influencing President Truman to desegregate the U.S. military." — Congressman Charles B. Rangel, Press Release. A single gold medal was struck, to be retained by the Smithsonian Institution.	
	The 14th Dalai Lama, Tenzin Gyatso	September 27, 2006	Pub. L. 109–287 (text) (PDF), 120 Stat. 1231	In recognition of the Dalai Lama's: "many enduring and outstanding contributions to peace, non-violence, human rights and religious understanding". — (Pub.L. 109-287)	
	Byron Nelson	October 16, 2006	Pub. L. 109–357 (text) (PDF), 120 Stat. 2044	"The Congressional Gold Medal is given to individuals who exemplify the American spirit by serving their community and helping those less fortunate, which is what Byron Nelson devoted his life to doing. The lives of countless Americans were touched because of the compassion, dedication and generosity of this great Texan." — John Cornyn, Republican Senator from Texas.	
	Dr. Norman Borlaug	December 6, 2006	Pub. L. 109–395 (text) (PDF) 120 Stat. 2708	"The most fitting tribute we can offer this good man is to renew ourselves to his life's work, and lead a second Green Revolution that feeds the world, and today we'll make a pledge to do so." — President George W. Bush, statement at Capitol Rotunda ceremony.	
	Dr. Michael E. DeBakey	October 2, 2007	Pub. L. 110–95 (text) (PDF); 121 Stat. 1008	"Dr. DeBakey's medical advances have contributed so much to our country and the world. Not only did he perfect the heart transplant procedure which has saved so many lives, but he also invented the M.A.S.H. unit. As a veteran of World War II, he saw our young men dying on the battlefield and was determined to improve medical care to save lives. Dr. DeBakey will receive the Congressional Gold Medal for these lasting contributions." — Kay Bailey Hutchison Republican Senator who introduced the legislation.	
	Aung San Suu Kyi	May 5, 2008	Pub. L. 110–209 (text) (PDF) 122 Stat. 721	"This is a well-deserved honor for a remarkable woman who has led the struggle for freedom and democracy in her country". — Mitch McConnell, then-leader of Republican United States Senators and sponsor of effort to award the medal to Suu Kyi.	
	Constantino Brumidi	July 1, 2008	Pub. L. 110–259 (text) (PDF); 122 Stat. 2430	Presented on July 11, 2012 (posthumously). "'An answer to a prayer' is how the curator for the Architect of the Capitol has described Brumid's arrival in this city at the end of 1854. And rightly so...today the Capitol stands, in my view, as the finest gallery of art in the country. The art here doesn't sit idle on display – every day, it summons the building to life and replenishes the soul of the Congress." — John Boehner, Speaker of the U.S. House of Representatives, excerpt of remarks made at presentation ceremony at the Rayburn Room of the Capitol.	
	Edward William Brooke III	July 1, 2008	Pub. L. 110–260 (text) (PDF); 122 Stat. 2433	"In recognition of his unprecedented and enduring service to our Nation." — P.L. 110-260	
	Native American code talkers	October 15, 2008	Pub. L. 110–420 (text) (PDF); 122 Stat. 4774	To recognize all Native American code talkers not previously awarded on December 21, 2000, a gold medal of individual design to be struck for every tribe that had members who were code talkers in World War I and World War II. The gold medal representing the tribe to be retained by the Smithsonian Institution, with silver duplicates to each individual code talker. On November 20, 2013, at a ceremony held at Emancipation Hall in the U.S. Capitol Visitor Center, 25 tribes were honored with medals, with an additional 8 tribes honored whose medals had not yet been struck, for a total of 33 tribes that have been so far identified.	See Code Talker Medals
	Women Airforce Service Pilots	July 1, 2009	Pub. L. 111–40 (text) (PDF); 123 Stat. 1958	"Their motives for wanting to fly airplanes all those years ago wasn't for fame or glory or recognition. They simply had a passion to take what gifts they had and use them to help defend not only America, but the entire free world, from tyranny. And they let no one get in their way." — Lt. Col. Nicole Malachowski, first female pilot in the USAF Thunderbirds, remarks made at presentation ceremony on March 10, 2010 in Emancipation Hall of the U.S. Capitol Visitor Center. A single gold medal was struck, to be retained by the Smithsonian Institution. At the ceremony, every attending WASP and a family member of a deceased WASP received a bronze duplicate (bronze duplicates are typically made available for sale through the U.S. Mint) financed through donations.	
	Neil A. Armstrong, Edwin E. "Buzz" Aldrin Jr., Michael Collins, and John Herschel Glenn Jr.	August 7, 2009	Pub. L. 111–44 (text) (PDF); 123 Stat. 1966	In recognition of their significant contributions to society. "We stand on the shoulders of the extraordinary men we recognize today...Those of us who have had the privilege to fly in space followed the trail they forged...When, 50 years ago this year, President Kennedy challenged the nation to reach the moon, to 'take longer strides' toward a 'great new American enterprise,' these men were the human face of those words...From Mercury and Gemini, on through our landings on the Moon in the Apollo Program, their actions unfolded the will of a nation for the greater achievement of humankind." — Charles F. Bolden Jr., Administrator of NASA, excerpt of remarks made at presentation ceremony November 16, 2011, at the Rotunda on Capitol Hill.	
	Arnold Palmer	September 30, 2009	Pub. L. 111–65 (text) (PDF); 123 Stat. 2003	In recognition of his service to the Nation in promoting excellence and good sportsmanship. "Arnold Palmer is a legend both on and off the golf course...His impact on players, tournaments, fans, sponsors, sports television, volunteers and perhaps most importantly on communities where he worked, lived and competed cannot be measured but is deeply felt and will continue have a tremendous impact for generations." — PGA Tour Commissioner Tim Finchem.	
	Muhammad Yunus	October 5, 2010	Pub. L. 111–253 (text) (PDF); 124 Stat. 2635	"Professor Yunus set out to do what may be the biggest thing of all, and that is liberating people to seek a better life. And not just any people, but men and women who had only known misery, who had been told they were no good." — John Boehner, Speaker of the House of Representatives, excerpt of remarks made at presentation ceremony April 17, 2013, at the Rotunda on Capitol Hill.	
	The 100th Infantry Battalion, the 442nd Regimental Combat Team, and the Military Intelligence Service	October 8, 2010	Pub. L. 111–254 (text) (PDF); 124 Stat. 2637	In recognition of their dedicated service during World War II. A single gold medal was struck, and it was first presented collectively at a ceremony at the U.S Capitol Visitor Center on November 2, 2011. The medal will tour various museums in conjunction with further presentation ceremonies and then be put on permanent display at the Smithsonian Institution.	
	Montford Point Marines	November 23, 2011	Pub. L. 112–59 (text) (PDF); 125 Stat. 749	In recognition of their personal sacrifice and service to their country. A single gold medal was struck, and was presented collectively on June 27, 2012, in Emancipation Hall at the U.S. Capitol Visitor Center. The following day, in a ceremony at Marine Barracks, every attending Montford Point Marine and a family member of a deceased Montford Point Marine was presented with a bronze duplicate (bronze duplicates are typically available for sale through the U.S. Mint) financed through donations.	
	In honor of the men and women who perished as a result of the terrorist attacks on the United States on September 11, 2001	December 23, 2011	Pub. L. 112–76 (text) (PDF); 125 Stat. 1275	Three gold medals to be struck, one medal shall be given to each of the Flight 93 National Memorial in Pennsylvania, the National September 11 Memorial and Museum in New York, and the Pentagon Memorial at the Pentagon, with the understanding that each medal is to be put on permanent, appropriate display.	
	Raoul Wallenberg	July 26, 2012	Pub. L. 112–148 (text) (PDF); 126 Stat. 1140	"In recognition of his achievements and heroic actions during the Holocaust." — P.L. 112-148	
	Addie Mae Collins, Denise McNair, Carole Robertson, and Cynthia Wesley	May 24, 2013	Pub. L. 113–11 (text) (PDF)	Congressional gold medal award to victims of the 16th Street Baptist Church bombing (H.R. 360; 113th Congress)	
	First Special Service Force	July 12, 2013	Pub. L. 113–16 (text) (PDF)	Granted collectively in recognition of its superior service during World War II.	
	Members of the Doolittle Tokyo Raiders	May 23, 2014	Pub. L. 113–106 (text) (PDF)	"To award a Congressional Gold Medal to the World War II members of the "Doolittle Tokyo Raiders", for outstanding heroism, valor, skill, and service to the United States in conducting the bombings of Tokyo."	
	American Flying aces	May 23, 2014	Pub. L. 113–105 (text) (PDF)	"To award a Congressional Gold Medal to the American Fighter Aces, collectively, in recognition of their heroic military service and defense of our country's freedom throughout the history of aviation warfare."	
	WWII members of the Civil Air Patrol	May 30, 2014	Pub. L. 113–108 (text) (PDF)	Honoring the services of over 200,000 Civil Air Patrol volunteers during World War II.	
	President of the State of Israel Shimon Peres	June 9, 2014	Pub. L. 113–114 (text) (PDF)	"Shimon Peres has honorably served Israel for over 70 years, during which he has significantly contributed to United States interests and has played a pivotal role in forging the strong and unbreakable bond between the United States and Israel."	
	"Monuments Men" aka members of the Monuments, Fine Arts, and Archives Section under the Allied Armies	June 9, 2014	Pub. L. 113–116 (text) (PDF)	"In recognition of their heroic role in the preservation, protection, and restitution of monuments, works of art, and artifacts of cultural importance during and following World War II." Living recipients who attended the ceremony included Harry Ettlinger and Motoko Fujishiro Huthwaite.	
	65th Infantry Regiment	June 10, 2014	Pub. L. 113–120 (text) (PDF)	The 65th Infantry is the first Hispanic military unit, and the first unit of the Korean War, to be awarded the Congressional Gold Medal.	
	Jack Nicklaus	December 16, 2014	Pub. L. 113–210 (text) (PDF)	In recognition of his service to the Nation in promoting excellence and good sportsmanship (PL 113-210).	
	Selma to Montgomery marchers	March 7, 2015	Pub. L. 114–5 (text) (PDF)	"To the Foot Soldiers who participated in Bloody Sunday, Turnaround Tuesday, or the final Selma to Montgomery Voting Rights March in March of 1965, which served as a catalyst for the Voting Rights Act of 1965."	
	Filipino World War II Veterans	December 14, 2016	Pub. L. 114–265 (text) (PDF)	Senate Bill 1555 was introduced by Senator Mazie Hirono (HI) and the House companion bill was introduced by Representative Tulsi Gabbard (HI-02).	
	Office of Strategic Services	December 14, 2016	Pub. L. 114–269 (text) (PDF)	In commemoration to the members of the Office of Strategic Services (OSS), in recognition of their superior service and major contributions during World War II.--PL 114-269	
	Bob Dole	September 15, 2017	Pub. L. 115–60 (text) (PDF)	In recognition for his service to the nation as a soldier, legislator, and statesman. (PL 115-60).	
	Anwar Sadat Centennial Celebration Act	December 13, 2018	Pub. L. 115–310 (text) (PDF)	To award the Congressional Gold Medal to Anwar Sadat in recognition of his heroic achievements and courageous contributions to peace in the Middle East.	
	Larry Doby	December 17, 2018	Pub. L. 115–322 (text) (PDF)	In recognition of his achievements and contributions to American major league athletics, civil rights, and the Armed Forces during World War II.	
	Chinese American Veterans of World War II	December 20, 2018	Pub. L. 115–337 (text) (PDF)	In recognition of their dedicated service during World War II.	
	The crew of the USS Indianapolis	December 20, 2018	Pub. L. 115–338 (text) (PDF)	In recognition of their perseverance, bravery, and service to the United States. To be given to the Indiana War Memorial Museum in Indianapolis, Indiana for appropriate display.	
	Steve Gleason	January 3, 2019	Pub. L. 115–415 (text) (PDF)	"Following his diagnosis, Steve, with the loving support of his wife, Michel, began a mission to show that patients can not only live but thrive after a diagnosis of ALS and established The Gleason Initiative Foundation also known simply as 'Team Gleason'." Gleason is the first NFL player to receive the award.	
	Katherine Johnson	November 8, 2019	Pub. L. 116–68 (text) (PDF)	In recognition of her service to the United States as a mathematician.	
	Christine Darden	November 8, 2019	Pub. L. 116–68 (text) (PDF)	For her service to the United States as an aeronautical engineer.	
	Dorothy Vaughan	November 8, 2019	Pub. L. 116–68 (text) (PDF)	In recognition of her service to the United States during the Space Race.	
	Mary Jackson	November 8, 2019	Pub. L. 116–68 (text) (PDF)	In recognition of her service to the United States during the Space Race.	
	Unnamed recipients	November 8, 2019	Pub. L. 116–68 (text) (PDF)	In recognition of all the women who served as computers, mathematicians, and engineers at the National Advisory Committee for Aeronautics and the National Aeronautics and Space Administration (NASA) between the 1930s and the 1970s.	
	Merrill's Marauders	October 17, 2020	Pub. L. 116–170 (text) (PDF)	In recognition of their bravery and outstanding service in the jungles of Burma (Myanmar) during World War II.	
	World War II Rosie the Riveters (accepted by Mae Krier)	December 3, 2020	Pub. L. 116–195 (text) (PDF)	"to the women in the United States who joined the workforce during World War II, providing the aircraft, vehicles, weaponry, ammunition and other material to win the war, that were referred to as 'Rosie the Riveter', in recognition of their contributions to the United States and the inspiration they have provided to ensuing generations."	
	Greg LeMond	December 4, 2020	Pub. L. 116–208 (text) (PDF)	In recognition of his service to the Nation as an athlete, activist, role model, and community leader.	
	U.S. Capitol Police and Metropolitan Police Department of the District of Columbia officers	August 5, 2021	Pub. L. 117–32 (text) (PDF)	In recognition of the law enforcement agencies that protected the U.S. Capitol on January 6, 2021.	
	369th Infantry Regiment	August 25, 2021	Pub. L. 117–38 (text) (PDF)	In recognition of the regiment, commonly known as the Harlem Hellfighters, for their bravery and outstanding service during World War I.	
	The 13 servicemembers killed in action at Kabul International Airport	December 16, 2021	Pub. L. 117–72 (text) (PDF)	In recognition for going above and beyond the call of duty to protect citizens of the United States and our allies to ensure they are brought to safety in an extremely dangerous situation as the Taliban regained control over Afghanistan and exemplified extreme bravery and valor against armed enemy combatants. Servicemembers listed: Maxton Soviak, Kareem Nikoui, David Espinoza, Rylee McCollum, Jared Schmitz, Hunter Lopez, Taylor Hoover, Daegan William-Tyeler Page, Nicole Gee, Humberto Sanchez, Dylan Merola, Johanny Rosario Pichardo, and Ryan Knauss.	
	Willie O'Ree	January 31, 2022	Pub. L. 117–84 (text) (PDF)	In recognition of his extraordinary contributions and commitment to hockey, inclusion, and recreational opportunity.	
	The 23rd Headquarters Special Troops and the 3133rd Signal Services Company	February 1, 2022	Pub. L. 117–85 (text) (PDF)	The "Ghost Army," a 1,100-man WW II U.S. Army tactical deception unit officially known as the 23rd Headquarters Special Troops, saved between 20,000 and 30,000 Allied lives. Their activity was kept secret for more than 40-years, until it was declassified in 1996.	
WAC 6888th	The 6888th Central Postal Directory Battalion	March 14, 2022	Pub. L. 117–97 (text) (PDF)	All-female, all-black battalion deployed during World War Two who sorted mail in England and France; includes Romay Davis	
	World War II Merchant Marine	May 19, 2022	Pub. L. 116–125 (text) (PDF)	The Merchant Mariners who delivered 15 million tons of goods in war materials to five continents and who served as part of the U.S. Military to deliver supplies and personnel to foreign countries engulfed in the war. A higher proportion of Merchant Mariners lost their lives between 1939 and 1945 than any military branch.	
	Ben Ferencz	December 29, 2022	Pub. L. 117–328 (text) (PDF)	In recognition of his service to the United States and the international community during the post-World War II Nuremberg trials and his lifelong advocacy for international criminal justice and the rule of law.	
	Emmett Till and Mamie Till-Mobley	January 5, 2023	Pub. L. 117–334 (text) (PDF)	To "honor the legacy of Emmett Till and the incredible suffering and equally incredible courage, resilience, and efforts of Mamie Till-Mobley that led to the civil rights movement that began in the 1950s."	
	Dustoff Crews of the Vietnam War	September 26, 2024	Pub. L. 118–87 (text) (PDF)	In recognition of their extraordinary heroism and life-saving actions in Vietnam.	
	Billie Jean King	September 26, 2024	Pub. L. 118–88 (text) (PDF)	In recognition of her courageous and groundbreaking leadership in advancing equal rights for women in athletics, education, and society.	
	Forgotten Heroes of the Holocaust	December 12, 2024	Pub. L. 118–149 (text) (PDF)	To recognize 60 diplomats from around the world for "their bravery and heroism during the Holocaust.	
	Shirley Chisholm	December 12, 2024	Pub. L. 118–150 (text) (PDF)	To recognize Shirley Chisholm for her public service to the United States and for her contributions to the advancement of African Americans and women in politics.	
	Hello Girls of World War I, Army Signal Corps	December 23, 2024	Pub. L. 118–159 (text) (PDF)	To recognize their roles as communication pioneers who paved the way for all women in uniform, and for service that was essential to victory in World War I.	
	Everett Alvarez Jr.	December 23, 2024	Pub. L. 118–161 (text) (PDF)	To recognize Commander Everett Alvarez, Jr.'s "historic sacrifices for the United States as the first United States pilot shot down and captured during the Vietnam war and the second-longest prisoner of war in United States history, surviving over eight and half years in captivity."	
	1980 United States Olympic Men's National Ice Hockey Team	December 12, 2025	Pub. L. 119–53 (menu; GPO has not yet published law)	In recognition of the 1980 U.S. Olympic men's Ice Hockey Team's achievement at the 1980 Winter Olympics.	

== See also ==
- Congressional Silver Medal
- Congressional Bronze Medal
- Nisei Soldiers of World War II Congressional Gold Medal
- List of Presidential Medal of Freedom recipients
- Awards and decorations of the United States government

== Sources ==
- Office of the Clerk. "Congressional Gold Medal Recipients: (1776 to Present)". United States House of Representatives.
- Glassman, Matthew Eric (January 5, 2012). "Congressional Gold Medals, 1776–2012" (PDF). Congressional Research Service.
