= USS Newcomb =

Fletcher-class destroyer

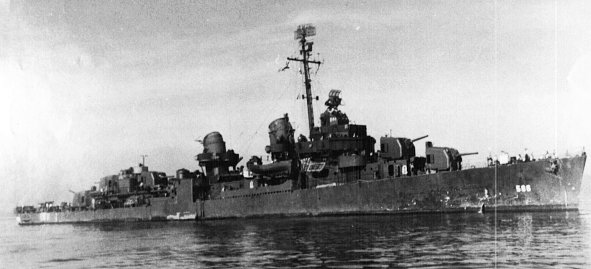
- USS Newcomb at sea

History

United States
- Name: Newcomb
- Namesake: Frank H. Newcomb
- Builder: Boston Navy Yard
- Laid down: 19 March 1943
- Launched: 4 July 1943
- Commissioned: 10 November 1943
- Decommissioned: 20 November 1945
- Stricken: 28 March 1946
- Fate: Scrapped, October 1947

General characteristics
- Class & type: Fletcher-class destroyer
- Displacement: 2,050 tons
- Length: 376 ft 6 in (114.76 m)
- Beam: 39 ft 8 in (12.09 m)
- Draft: 17 ft 9 in (5.41 m)
- Propulsion: 60,000 shp (45,000 kW); 2 propellers
- Speed: 35 knots (65 km/h; 40 mph)
- Range: 6,500 nmi (12,000 km) at 15 kn (28 km/h)
- Complement: 336
- Armament: 5 × single Mk 12 5 in (127 mm)/38 guns; 5 × twin 40 mm (1.6 in) Bofors AA guns; 7 × single 20 mm (0.8 in) Oerlikon AA guns; 2 × quintuple 21 in (533 mm) torpedo tubes; 6 × single depth charge throwers; 2 × depth charge racks

USS Newcomb (DD-586) was a Fletcher-class destroyer in the United States Navy during World War II. She was the only ship named for Commodore Frank H. Newcomb of the United States Revenue Cutter Service, Congressional Gold Medal recipient from the Spanish–American War.

Newcomb was laid down on 19 March 1943 by Boston Navy Yard and launched on 4 July 1943, sponsored by Mrs. C. C. Baughman. The ship was commissioned on 10 November 1943.

== History ==
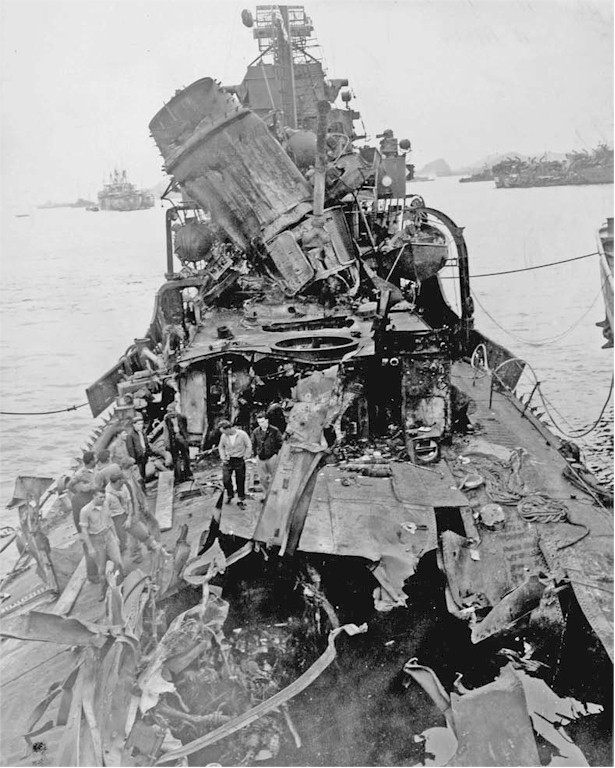
Damage caused by the kamikazes

Newcomb shook down in the West Indies for a month, then made passage to the Marshall Islands, arriving 4 April 1944 for two months duty on antisubmarine patrol off the Japanese held Mille, Wotje, and Jaluit atolls. She next joined the assault on Saipan as flagship for the screen from 29 May until 5 August, serving as fire support and patrol ship at both Saipan and Tinian. On 22 June, while guarding transports, she and Chandler sank Japanese submarine I-185, and on 4 July her well-directed fire broke up a Japanese banzai attack north of Garapan on Saipan.

Operating in the Fire Support and Bombardment Group for the assault on the Palaus 6 September to 1 October, Newcomb fired 23 separate shore bombardments and also covered underwater demolition teams providing bombardment control spotting. As flagship of Destroyer Squadron 56 (DesRon 56), Newcomb joined in the Leyte landings 12 October to 4 December, covering underwater demolition teams and firing preinvasion-bombardment, call-fire, night-harassing and illumination missions.

Her squadron made a night torpedo attack in the Surigao Strait phase of the Battle for Leyte Gulf 25 October. At least one of her five torpedoes struck the battleship Yamashiro, sunk in this action. Closely straddled but not damaged, Newcomb went to the aid of the stricken destroyer Albert W. Grant, providing medical aid and a tow out of the battle area. In this battle, Newcomb and her sister ships played a key role in the victory which insured the success of General Douglas MacArthur's return to the Philippines, and effectively ended major Japanese naval threats for the remainder of the war.

Often under fire from Japanese aircraft, several of which she destroyed, Newcomb continued service in the Philippines, engaging Japanese shore batteries at Ormoc 9 December while screening landing craft, fighting a convoy through heavy enemy air attack to Mindoro 19 through 24 December, and driving off two kamikazes during the Lingayen landing on 6 January 1945. She covered operations in Lingayen Gulf through 24 January, then prepared for duty as fire support ship at Iwo Jima from 10 February, where she covered minesweeping for three days prior to the landing. During the invasion the destroyer engaged shore batteries and fired accurate bombardments of in assistance to troops ashore. She again engaged a Japanese submarine on 25 February, with unknown results.

Departing Iwo Jima on 10 March, Newcomb put in at Ulithi, where she was assigned to Task Force 54 (TF 54) for the invasion of Okinawa. Newcomb again covered underwater demolition and minesweeping operations as well as antiaircraft and shore bombardment until 6 April, when she was screening minesweepers off Ie Shima. At least 40 enemy aircraft were observed in the area during the day, and at 16:00 attacks began. Though handicapped by a low ceiling, her gunners were able to drive off or shoot down several attackers, but over a period of an hour and a half, she was struck five times. With the effort that won them a Navy Unit Commendation, her crew worked furiously to repair engine damage and extinguish fires, while continuing to fight their ship and maneuver to avoid further crashes. Aid was rendered by Leutze, herself struck by the fifth kamikaze skipping across from Newcomb, and Beale. Afloat with fires and power out, the toll for the attack was 18 killed, 25 missing, and 64 wounded; Newcomb was towed to Kerama Retto by Tekesta.

Repairs to her hull were made by Vestal under frequent enemy air attack, and on 14 June she left under tow for Saipan, Pearl Harbor, and San Francisco, arriving 8 August.

== Fate ==
The end of the war ended further repairs, and Newcomb decommissioned on 20 November 1945. Stricken from the Navy List on 28 March 1946, she was scrapped at Mare Island Navy Yard in October 1947.

Newcomb received 8 battle stars for World War II service.

== See also ==
- USS Simon Newcomb (AGSC-14)
