= Congressional Bronze Medal =

The United States Congress awarded its first Gold Medal to George Washington. Silver and Bronze medals have sometimes been awarded in conjunction with the higher award. A Bronze medal should not be confused with a bronze duplicate of a gold medal. Bronze duplicates of gold medals are sometimes offered for sale by the U.S. Mint.

Bronze medals are rarely awarded:

- In 1900, Congress directed that a gold medal be made for First Lieutenant Frank H. Newcomb, U.S. Revenue Cutter Service, and to each of his officers a silver medal, and to each member of his crew a bronze medal. (31 Stat. 716)
- In 1914, Congress directed that gold medals be made for steamship captain Paul H. Kreibohm and four additional officers, with silver and bronze medals awarded to other members of his crew. (38 Stat. 769)
- In 1930, Congress directed that gold, silver, and bronze medals be made for the officers and men of the Byrd Antarctic expedition.
- In 1945, Congress directed that gold, silver, and bronze medals be made for the members of the United States Antarctic Expedition of 1939–1941 (Public Law 79-185, 59 Stat. 536).

Congress may also authorize the U.S. Mint to strike commemorative bronze medals, such as the Pearl Harbor Commemorative Medal.
