= J Horn =

J Horn may refer to:

- Michael "J" Horn
- John A. Horn (born 1968), former United States Attorney
- John Galbraith Horn (1860–1925), British tennis player
- John J. Horn (1917–1999), American labor leader and politician from New Jersey
- John L. Horn (1928–2006), American psychologist
- John Horn (tennis) (1931–2001), British tennis player
- John Horn Jr. (1843–1920), awarded a Congressional Gold Medal in 1874 for a career rescuing people from drowning
- Steve Horn (John Stephen Horn, 1931–2011), American politician from California
