= USS Machias (PG-5) =

United States schooner-rigged gunboat

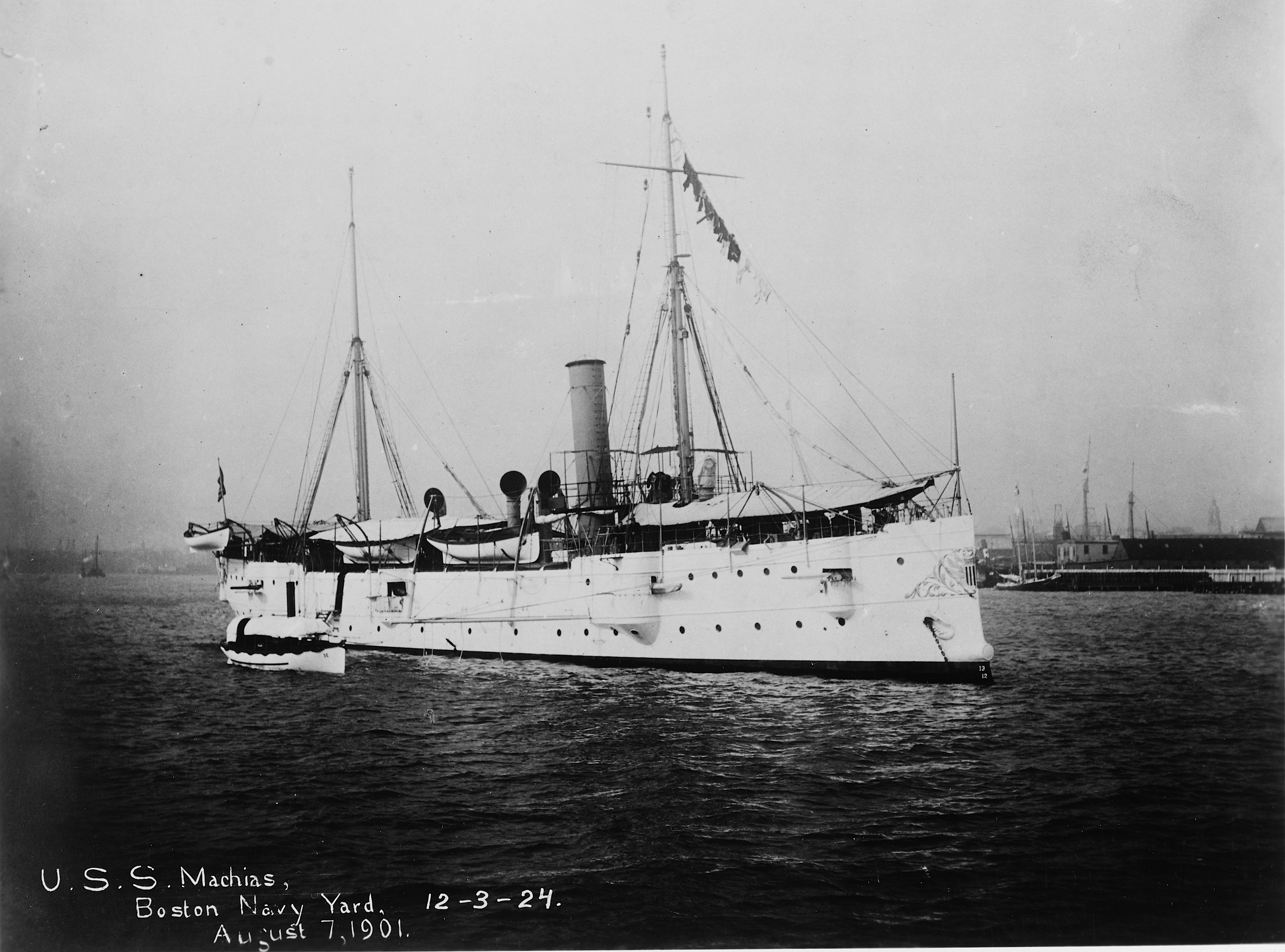
- USS Machias off Boston, 7 August 1901

History

United States
- Name: USS Machias
- Namesake: Machias, Maine
- Builder: Bath Iron Works, Bath, Maine
- Laid down: February 1891
- Launched: 8 December 1891
- Christened: Sponsored by Miss Ethel Hyde, daughter of President Hyde of Bath Iron Works
- Commissioned: 20 July 1893
- Decommissioned: 3 October 1919
- Reclassified: PG-5, 17 July 1920
- Home port: Various
- Fate: Sold to Mexico, 29 October 1920

Mexico
- Name: Agua Prieta
- Acquired: 29 October 1920
- Fate: Disposed of, 1935

General characteristics
- Displacement: 1,177 tons
- Length: 204 ft (62 m)
- Beam: 32 ft 1 in (9.78 m)
- Draft: 14 ft (4.3 m)
- Propulsion: 2 × horizontal triple-expansion engines, 3405 hp, steam and sail, two shafts
- Speed: 15.5 knots (28.7 km/h; 17.8 mph)
- Complement: 154
- Armament: 8 × 4 in (100 mm) guns; 4 × 6-pounder guns; 4 × 1-pounder guns

The first USS Machias (PG-5), a schooner-rigged gunboat, was laid down in February 1891 by Bath Iron Works, Bath, Maine. She was launched on 8 December 1891. She was sponsored by Miss Ethel Hyde, daughter of President Hyde of Bath Iron Works and commissioned at Portsmouth Navy Yard, Kittery, Maine, 20 July 1893, Commander Charles J. Train in command.

== Service ==
Following shakedown along the east coast and service on the North Atlantic station, Machias departed Portsmouth in November 1894 for the Asiatic station, sailing via the Azores, Gibraltar, Malta, Suez, Aden, Ceylon, and Singapore, arriving Hong Kong on 6 March 1895. For the next two years, the gunboat remained in the Far East, protecting American interests in Korea and Japan during the Sino-Japanese War, making intermittent visits to treaty ports up the Yangtze River, and, in general, showing the flag from Port Arthur to Saigon, until departing Hong Kong on 16 December 1897 to return home the way she came, arriving Boston on 18 March.

Sailing for Key West, Florida, on 7 April, the ship joined the North Atlantic Fleet blockading Cuba and participated in the engagement of Cárdenas on 11 May, leading the gunboats Wilmington and Hudson, and torpedo boat Winslow against three Spanish gunboats in the bay. Continuing on blockade duty through September, in addition serving as a transport for Army troops and supplies, Machias sailed north to Boston and then Portsmouth for repairs until 15 January 1899. The gunboat then returned to the Caribbean, operating off Cuba, in the West Indies and along the coast of Central America, showing the flag and protecting American interests until sailing for Washington, D.C., to join in the celebration in honor of Admiral George Dewey on 24 September. She returned to the Caribbean in January 1900, resuming her patrols and, in addition, carrying the U.S. Minister to Venezuela on a diplomatic mission until ordered home on 8 July, arriving at Boston on the 17th, and decommissioning there on 14 August.

Machias was recommissioned on 24 July 1901 and sailed 15 days later to return to the Caribbean on patrol operations off Panama and Colombia during the Panamanian Revolution, protecting American lives and property off Panama through the end of the year; and then, following repairs at Boston, landing troops at Boca del Toro, Colombia, 17 to 19 April 1902. Attached to the Caribbean Patrol Squadron on 4 October, the gunboat remained in Latin American waters until 8 January 1903 when she was assigned to the European Squadron and sailed on the 12th from San Juan, Puerto Rico, for the Mediterranean. Steaming via Bermuda, the Azores, and Gibraltar, she arrived off the Riviera in late March and remained there on patrol until sailing in mid-May for a trip to northern Europe, visiting Southampton, England, and transiting the Kiel Canal, returning to the Mediterranean on 30 June. From 21 November to 18 January 1904 the ship made a good will visit to Djibouti, Abyssinia, and then, 1 March, was detached from the European Squadron and sailed for home, arriving at Pensacola on the 26th. She decommissioned there on 14 May and remained there until assigned to the Connecticut Naval Militia on 19 November 1907.

Machias departed Pensacola on 17 January 1908 for New York and following refit was turned over to the Connecticut Naval Militia on 27 June. Based at New Haven, the gunboat continued on this duty, making a cruise once a year off New England until withdrawn on 25 April 1914 and taken to New York where she once again was placed in full commission on the 27th. Assigned to the Special Service Squadron, the warship sailed on 17 May for the Caribbean, patrolling off the Dominican Republic and Haiti through the end of 1914 when she was placed in reserve at New York on 1 February 1915. (The trip to New York was used to transfer $500,000 in Haitian gold to National City Bank's vaults at the behest of the bank's Vice President Roger Leslie Farnham. ) While in Haiti, she saw active duty, silencing government forces bombarding Puerto Plata.

Reactivated on 1 April, the gunboat sailed for Mexico, arriving at Veracruz on 14 June to join the fleet protecting American lives and property during a revolution. She then returned to Mobile and New Orleans for repairs from October 1915 to February 1916. Repaired, she returned to Mexico and evacuated a number of Americans from Tuxpan, where there were disturbances, and took the evacuees to Tampico.

The ship continued her operations in the Caribbean, basing out of New Orleans and patrolling off Cuba, the Dominican Republic, and the Danish West Indies. The patrols of the Danish West Indies was to protect American neutrality prior to U.S. entry into World War I in April 1917.

Machias departed New Orleans on 22 July for Gibraltar, steaming via Key West, Bermuda, and the Azores, arriving at Gibraltar on 22 August. Assigned to the patrol force in European waters, she operated out of Gibraltar on antisubmarine patrol through July 1918, and was then ordered home, departing for New London on 20 August and then sailing to Charleston where she refitted. The veteran gunboat departed Charleston in April 1919 for the Pacific, transiting the Panama Canal and operating along the west coast of Central America until 27 August when she arrived Mare Island Navy Yard for inactivation.

== Fate ==
Machias was decommissioned there on 3 October 1919 and was sold on 29 October 1920 to the Mexican Navy. Renamed Agua Prieta, the old gunboat served as a transport and coast guard ship along the west coast of Mexico for the next 15 years. The Mexican Navy finally disposed of her in late 1935.

== Awards ==
- Sampson Medal
- Navy Expeditionary Medal
- Spanish Campaign Medal
- Mexican Service Medal
- Dominican Campaign Medal
- World War I Victory Medal with "PATROL" clasp
