= Cardenas Medal =

American award for the crew of the USRC Hudson

Cardenas Medal of Honor
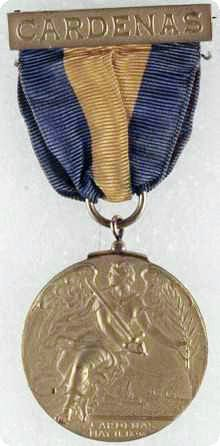
- Obverse
- Type: Medal in Gold, Silver, and Bronze
- Awarded for: The gallantry displayed by Frank H. Newcomb, his officers and the men, for their intrepid and heroic gallantry in the action at Cardenas, Cuba
- Presented by: 56th United States Congress
- Eligibility: Crew of the USRC Hudson
- Established: May 3, 1900
- Service ribbon of the medal

1930 Order of Wear
- Next (higher): Good Conduct Medal
- Equivalent: Dewey Medal
- Next (lower): Sampson Medal

The Cardenas Medal was an award approved by an act of Congress of the United States on May 3, 1900 (31 Stat. 716, 56th Congress). The award recognizes the crew of the USRC Hudson, who showed gallantry in action at the Battle of Cárdenas during the Spanish–American War.

The statute awarding the medal is listed as follows:

Resolved by the Senate and House of Representatives of the United States of America in Congress assembled, That in recognition of the gallantry of First Lieutenant Frank H. Newcomb, of the Revenue-Cutter Service, commanding the revenue cutter Hudson, his officers and the men of his command, for their intrepid and heroic gallantry in the action at Cardenas, Cuba, on the eleventh day of May, eighteen hundred and ninety-eight, when the Hudson rescued the United States naval torpedo boat Winslow in the face of a most galling fire from the enemy's guns, the Winslow being disabled, her captain wounded, her only other officer and half her crew killed. The commander of the Hudson kept his vessel in the very center of the hottest fire of the action, although in constant danger of going ashore on account of the shallow water, until finally he got a line made fast to the Winslow and towed that vessel out of range of the enemy's guns. In commemoration of this signal act of heroism it is hereby enacted that the Secretary of the Treasury be authorized and directed to cause to be and to present to First Lieutenant Frank H. Newcomb, Revenue-Cutter Service, a gold medal, and to each of his officers a silver medal, and to each member of his crew a bronze medal.

== Appearance ==
One medal was struck in gold for Newcomb, four in silver for the officers and 17 in bronze for the men of Hudson. The medal was designed by Charles E. Barber. The obverse of the medal depicts Victory wearing a winged cap. In her right hand she holds a sword and in her left an olive branch. In the background is the scene of Hudson tying up to the Winslow. At the bottom is the inscription CARDENAS MAY 11, 1898.

The reverse of the medal bears the inscription in eleven lines: JOINT RESOLUTIONS OF CONGRESS APPROVED MAY 3, 1900. IN RECOGNITION OF THE GALLANTRY OF THE OFFICERS AND MEN OF THE HUDSON WHO IN THE FACE OF GALLING FIRE TOWED THE WINSLOW OUT OF RANGE OF THE ENEMY'S GUNS. To the right of the inscription is a nude female figure holding a chisel and hammer, to the left is a palm leaf and laurel branch. At the bottom is a tablet flanked by laurels where recipients' names are engraved.

The medal was originally struck as a non-wearable table top medal. It was also accompanied by a wearable medal. Both medals were struck by the U.S. Mint in 1902. The Cardenas Medal of Honor appears in regulations on order of wear as late as 1930.

== See also ==
- Congressional Gold Medal
- Four Chaplains' Medal
- Specially Meritorious Service Medal
