= USRC Hudson =

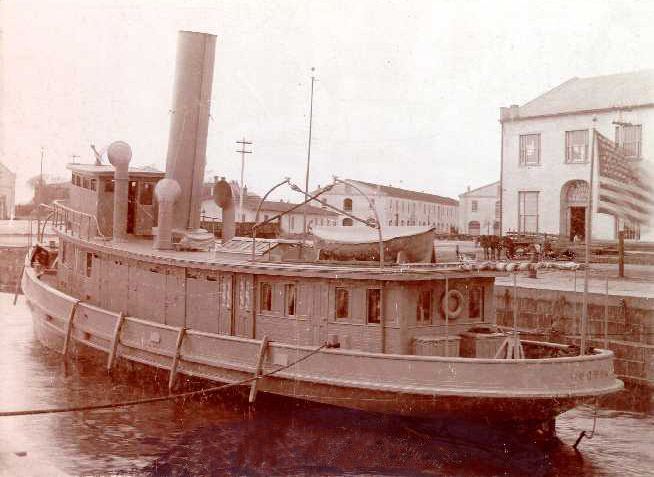
- USRC Hudson

History

United States
- Namesake: Hudson River
- Operator: U.S. Revenue Cutter Service (1893–1915); U.S. Coast Guard (1915–1935)
- Awarded: 18 February 1892
- Builder: John H. Dialogue and Sons, Camden, New Jersey
- Cost: US$36,500
- Completed: 17 August 1893
- Commissioned: 15 September 1893
- Decommissioned: 3 May 1935
- Fate: Sold

General characteristics
- Displacement: 128 tons
- Length: 94 ft 6.25 in (28.8100 m)
- Beam: 20 ft 6 in (6.25 m)
- Height: 10 ft 3 in (3.12 m)
- Draft: 8 ft 4 in (2.54 m)
- Propulsion: Triple-expansion reciprocating steam engine,13 in (0.33 m), 20 in (0.51 m), 31.5 in (0.80 m) diameter X 24 in (0.61 m) stroke, single screw
- Speed: 12 knots maximum
- Complement: 11
- Armament: (1898); 2 × 6-pound Driggs-Schroeder rapid fire guns; 1 × Model 1895 Colt automatic machine gun.

USRC Hudson, known for her service during the Battle of Cárdenas, was the United States Revenue Cutter Service's first vessel to have a steel hull and triple-expansion steam engine.

== Construction ==
Hudson was built in the Camden, New Jersey shipyards of John H. Dialogue and Sons and was one of the first Revenue Cutter Service vessels to be completely designed by the service's recently established office of Superintendent of Construction. All of the blueprints and specifications for Hudson were turned over to the shipyard contractor and they were expected to build the vessel according to plan. Prior to establishment of the Superintendent's office by Commandant Leonard G. Shepard, the general layout of the vessel was left to the contractor. Hudson was the first revenue cutter designed with an all steel hull and triple expansion steam engines. Precise metallurgical specifications were used to construct the boiler plates, allowing a 160-pound boiler pressure that allowed the vessel the power to operate very successfully as a tug. Shepard's successor, Charles F. Shoemaker, noted in his Revenue Cutter Service annual report of 1897 that this was "the first and only effort at modern cutter construction up to 1895." When commissioned on 15 September 1893, Hudson was named for the Hudson River which empties into New York harbor. (Note: DANFS claims that Hudson is named after William Levereth Hudson, a U.S. Navy officer noted for his contributions to the Wilkes Exploring Expedition in 1838–1841 and to the laying of a trans-Atlantic cable in 1858.)

== History ==
=== New York Harbor ===
The crew of the decommissioned New York harbor tug USRC Washington was sent to Hudson as the crew and she immediately sailed for New York to assume the duties of a harbor tug after commissioning on 15 September 1893. Those duties included customs enforcement, checking ship documentation, quarantine enforcement, assistance to merchant ships, and search and rescue.

=== Spanish–American War ===
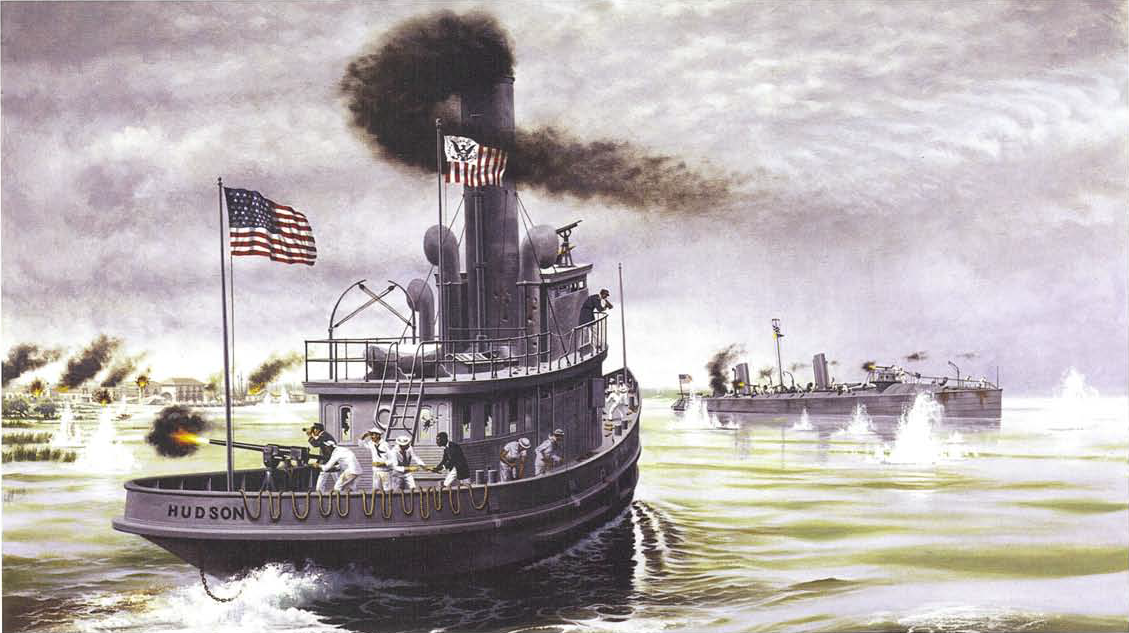
USRC Hudson, led by Frank Hamilton Newcomb, moves to assist a disabled USS Winslow during the Second Battle of Cárdenas.

Hudson was assigned on 24 March 1898 to duty with the U.S. Navy for the Spanish–American War. On 3 April she arrived at the Norfolk Naval Shipyard at Norfolk, Virginia and was outfitted with two six-pound rapid-fire guns and a Colt automatic machine gun. Additionally, the pilothouse was armored with 5/8-inch (16 mm) steel plate. On 11 May 1898 Hudson, along with the U.S. Navy warships USS Winslow, USS Machias, and USS Wilmington, had pursued three Spanish gunboats into the Bay of Cardenas, Cuba. There, shore batteries fired on the U.S. vessels and disabled Winslow, knocking out her steering and a boiler, thereby putting Winslow adrift. The accurate Spanish fire wounded Winslow's commanding officer and killed Ensign Worth Bagley and three crewmen. Although under fire from the Spanish guns for over thirty minutes, Hudson, commanded by First Lieutenant Frank H. Newcomb, sailed into the bay to save the disabled Winslow. Newcomb kept Hudson positioned in shoal waters near Winslow, until a line was passed to Winslow and made fast. Hudson then towed Winslow out of danger. During the time in the bay, both vessels continually fired on the Spanish positions. Hudson carried the bodies of those killed as well as the wounded, along with the dispatches of the squadron off Cardenas, to Havana, Cuba, arriving there on 14 May 1898. She remained there on blockade duty for a short time before departing to Key West, Florida. Another period of patrol ended 10 July as she returned to the blockading fleet with further dispatches. Hudson captured two fishing vessels that attempted to run the blockade off Havana. On 17 August Hudson was returned to Treasury Department control and she then departed for Norfolk, via Key West and Savannah, and arrived there on 21 August 1898.

==== Cardenas Medal ====
On 27 June 1898, President William McKinley recommended to Congress that the officers and crew of Hudson be awarded medals for their heroic actions at the Bay of Cardenas during the rescue of Winslow. Congress passed legislation awarding the Cardenas Medal to the crew of Hudson on 3 May 1900 (31 Stat. 717, 56th Congress).

=== Later service ===
Hudson arrived at New York on 6 October 1898 where she continued with her traditional duties; however, on 24 October she was ordered to Philadelphia, Pennsylvania to participate in a naval parade. She returned to New York after repairs were completed on 27 October. On 26 June she patrolled an intercollegiate regatta at Poughkeepsie, New York returning to New York harbor afterwards. On 26 January 1909 she had a collision with tow steamer Bouker off The Battery, New York City causing considerable damage to Bouker. At the declaration of war on Germany by Congress on 6 April 1917 Hudson was once again assigned to the U.S. Navy for service during World War I. On 6 April, she assisted the Collector of Customs at the Port of New York in transfer of the officers of the seized cruise liner Vaterland to Ellis Island for internment. During the war she was assigned port security and customs boarding duties initially, but later outfitted for minesweeping duties near Port Jefferson, New York. After December 1917, Hudson was used to patrol explosive loading barges near the Port of New York. She continued her service with the Navy until returned to Treasury Department control by Executive Order on 28 August 1919. Hudson was sent to Norfork for repairs in 1922, and to the Coast Guard Depot in Curtis Bay, Maryland in 1928; after each yard availability she returned to New York City for regular duties. She was decommissioned on 3 May 1935 and sold.

== Awards ==
- Sampson Medal
- Spanish Campaign Medal
- World War I Victory Medal

== Notes ==
Footnotes

Citations

References used

- "Annual report of the Supervising Inspector-general Steamboat-inspection Service, Year ending June 30, 1910". Penn State University.
- "Hudson". Dictionary of American Naval Fighting Ships. U.S. Navy Naval History & Heritage Command. Archived from the original on 15 March 2004.
- "Hudson, 1893" (PDF). Cutters, Craft & U.S. Coast Guard-Manned Army & Navy Vessels. U.S. Coast Guard Historian's Office.
- "Record of Movements, Vessels of the United States Coast Guard, 1790–December 31, 1933" (PDF). U.S. Coast Guard, Department of Transportation (1989 reprint).
- Canney, Donald L. (1995). U.S. Coast Guard and Revenue Cutters, 1790–1935. Naval Institute Press, Annapolis, Maryland. ISBN 978-1-55750-101-1.
- Evans, Stephen H. (1949). The United States Coast Guard 1790–1915: A Definitive History. Naval Institute Press, Annapolis, Maryland.
- Glassman, Matthew Eric (29 April 2014). "Congressional Gold Medals, 1776–2014". United States Senate. Congressional Research Service. p. 24.
- King, Irving H. (1996). The Coast Guard Expands, 1865–1915: New Roles, New Frontiers. Naval Institute Press, Annapolis, Maryland. ISBN 978-1-55750-458-6.
