= John Horne (disambiguation) =

John Horne (1848–1928) was a Scottish geologist.

John Horne is also the name of:

- John Horne (botanist) (1835–1905), botanist
- John Horne (footballer) (1862–1926), English soccer player
- John Horne (Governor of Bombay) (died 1755)
- John Horne Tooke (1736–1812), English politician, known as John Horne to 1782
- John R. Horne (born c. 1939), American businessman
- John E. Horne (1908–1985), American political strategist

== See also ==
- John Horn (disambiguation)
