= Washington Before Boston Medal =

1776 award of the Continental Congress

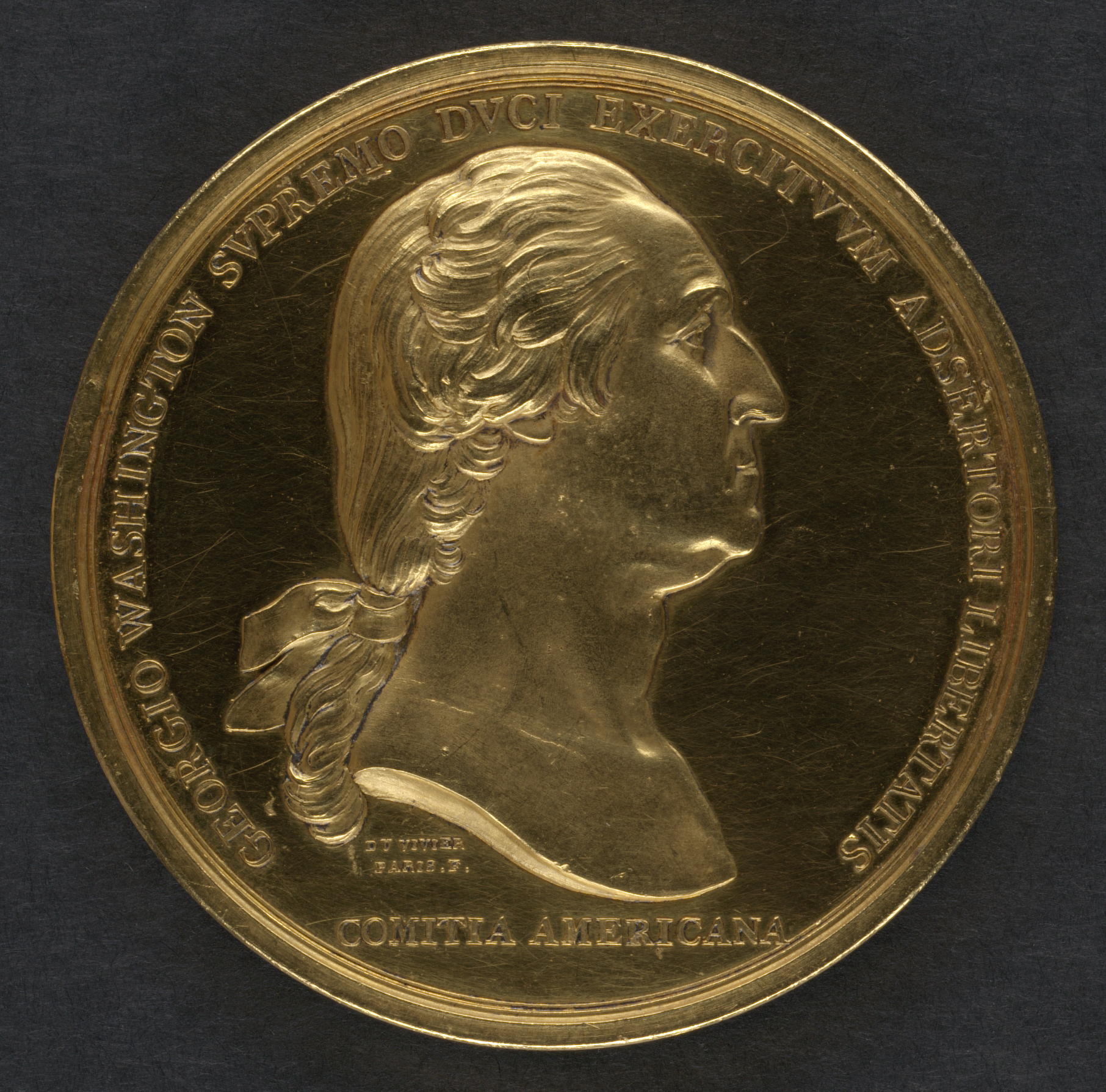
An image of the original gold strike, as presented to George Washington.

The Washington Before Boston Medal was the first medal commissioned by the Continental Congress and being struck in gold, is the first Congressional Gold Medal.

On March 25, 1776, Congress passed a resolution which read:

Resolved, That the thanks of this Congress, in their own name, and in the name of the thirteen United Colonies, whom they represent, be presented to His Excellency General Washington, and the officers and soldiers under his command, for their wise and spirited conduct in the siege and acquisition of Boston; and that a medal of gold be struck in commemoration of this great event, and presented to His Excellency; and that a committee of three be appointed to prepare a letter of thanks and a proper device for the medal.

Pierre-Simon-Benjamin Duvivier was commissioned to design and engrave the medal. Creating a medal during the American Revolutionary War was not a priority, and the medal was eventually struck in Paris and presented to Washington on March 21, 1790.

The medal remained in Washington's family after his death. In 1875, a committee of 50 prominent Boston citizens purchased the medal from the descendants of George Washington's nephew, George Steptoe Washington. The medal was then presented to the City of Boston to commemorate the centennial anniversary of American independence. The medal is now part of the collections of the Boston Public Library.
