= USS Arethusa (1864) =

Collier of the United States Navy

History

United States
- Name: USS Arethusa
- Ordered: as Wabask
- Laid down: date unknown
- Launched: 1864
- Acquired: 1 July 1864
- Commissioned: 29 July 1864
- Decommissioned: 3 January 1866
- Stricken: 1866 (est.)
- Homeport: Port Royal, South Carolina
- Fate: Sold, January 1866

General characteristics
- Type: Collier
- Displacement: 195 long tons (198 t)
- Length: 110 ft (34 m)
- Beam: 22 ft (6.7 m)
- Draft: 8 ft 8 in (2.64 m)
- Depth of hold: 9 ft 6 in (2.90 m)
- Propulsion: steam engine; screw-propelled
- Sail plan: Unknown
- Speed: Unknown
- Complement: 32
- Armament: 1 × 20-pounder Dahlgren rifle; 2 × two heavy 12-pounder smoothbore guns

USS Arethusa was a steamer captured by the Union Navy during the American Civil War. She was used by the Union Navy as a collier in support of the Union Navy blockade of Confederate waterways.

== Commissioned in Philadelphia in 1864 ==
Arethusa – a small screw steamer built in 1864 at Philadelphia as Wabask – was purchased there by the Navy from Messrs. S. and J. M. Flanagan on 1 July 1864; and was commissioned at the Philadelphia Navy Yard on 29 July 1864.

== Assigned to the South Atlantic Blockade ==
Assigned to the South Atlantic Blockading Squadron, Arethusa arrived at Port Royal, South Carolina on 6 August 1864 and served as a collier there through the end of the Civil War, supporting the Union warships which were becoming ever more efficient in then-efforts to enforce the blockade of the Southern coast.

== Post-war operations ==
Following the collapse of the Confederacy, the ship continued to serve at Port Royal assisting the Navy's efforts to demobilize the gigantic Fleet which it had built to prosecute the war.

== Post-war decommissioning and sale ==
When most of the Union warships had returned north, Arethusa was decommissioned at Port Royal on 3 January 1866 and sold there later that month. Unfortunately, all trace of the ship's career after she left the Navy seems to have vanished.
