= Paul H. Kreibohm =

German-American ship captain and rescuer

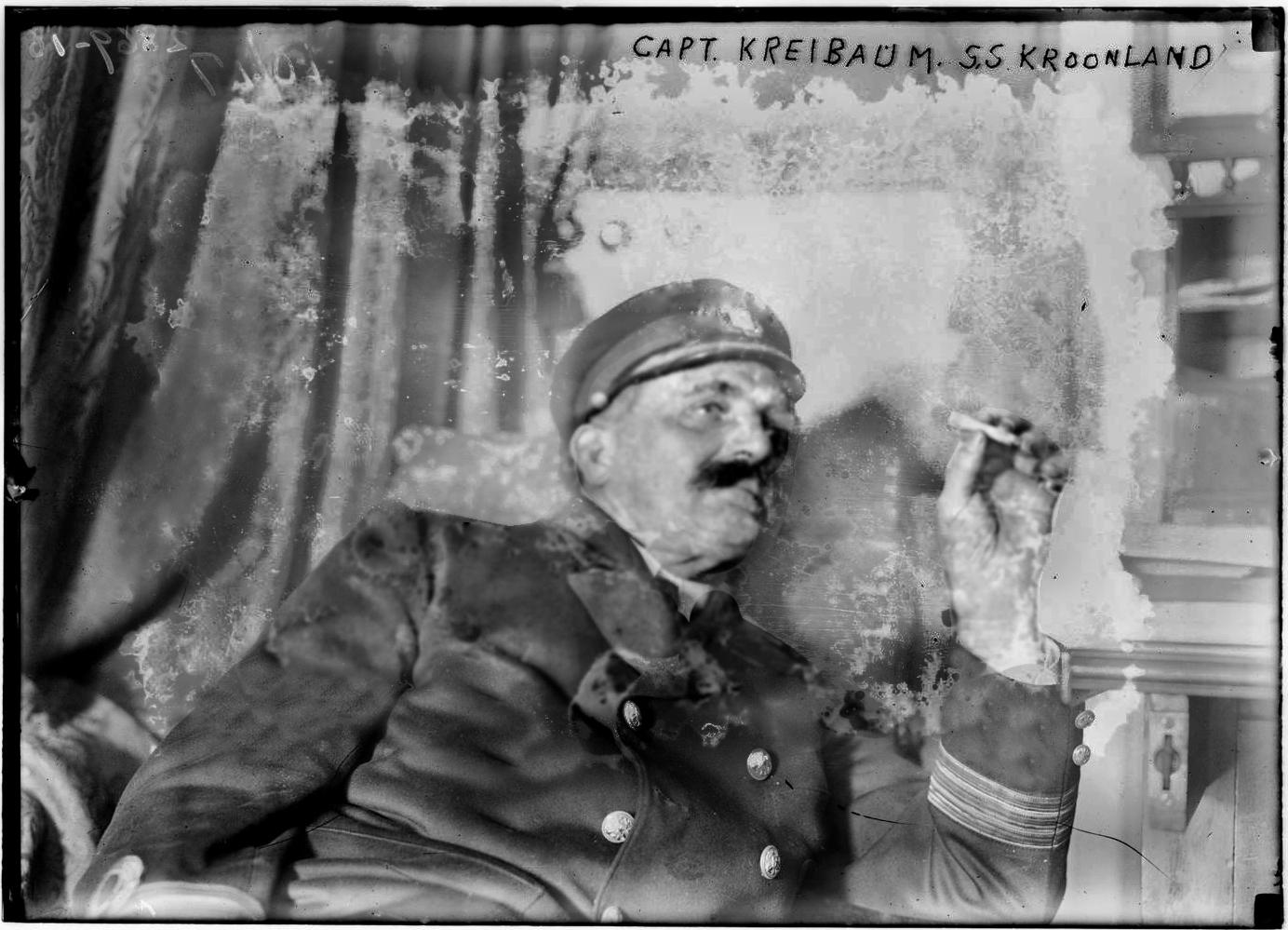
Paul H. Kreibohm, captain of the Red Star ocean liner SS Kroonland, c. 1913.

Paul H. Kreibohm (April 8, 1861 – December 29, 1938) was a German-born, American ship's Captain for the Red Star Line of the International Mercantile Marine Co. (IMM), who received a Congressional Gold Medal for his participation in the rescue of passengers and crew of the SS Volturno.

Born in Schwiegershausen in the Kingdom of Hanover (now Lower Saxony) on April 8, 1861, Kreibohm's family moved to Antwerp, Belgium when he was one year old. He later became an American citizen.

== Rescue of SS Volturno ==
On October 9, 1913, Captain Kreibohm of the SS Kroonland and other ships responded to a distress signal of the SS Volturno, which had caught fire in rough weather in the North Atlantic. The Kroonland saved 89 of the 520 persons rescued from the ship.

== Awards and honors ==
On March 19, 1914, the United States Congress awarded Kreibohm a gold watch and a gold medal, with additional gold, silver, and bronze medals to his officers and crew. The statute (38 Stat. 769) reads as follows:

Resolved by the Senate and House of Representatives of the United States of America in Congress assembled, That the thanks of Congress, and the same are hereby, extended to the captain of the American steamer Kroonland, of the Red Star Line, and through him to the officers and crew of said steamer, for promptly going to the relief of the burning steamer Volturno, in the north Atlantic Ocean on the ninth and tenth days of October, nineteen hundred and thirteen, and heroically rescuing eighty-nine people then on board said burning steamer. (Resolved that) The Secretary of Commerce be, and he is hereby, empowered, and directed to cause to be purchased and presented to Captain Paul H. Kreibohm, of the said steamer Kroonland, a suitable American-made solid gold dial watch and chain; and said Secretary is further authorized, empowered, and directed and cause to be made at the United States Mint five suitable gold, five silver, and twenty-nine bronze medals, which watch and medals shall be appropriately inscribed to express the high admiration in which Congress holds the services of the captain, officers, and crew of the steamer Kroonland, and be presented to the officers and crew, to whose promptness, vigilance, bravery, was due the rescue of eighty-nine lives.

On January 4, 1914, King Albert of Belgium appointed Kreibohm a Chevalier (Knight) of the Order of the Crown for "his bravery in rescuing the passengers of the Volturno"

In April 1914, The Life Saving Benevolent Association of New York awarded its Life Saving Medal to Kreibohm.

In September 1914, Kreibohm received an inscribed silver tray from the British Government acknowledging his humanity and kindness to the shipwrecked crew and passengers of the Volturno.

On June 25, 1916, Kreibohm was presented with the American Cross of Honor by Congressman Henry Bruckner.

== Later life ==
Although born before Hanover was incorporated into the German Empire, Kreibohm's father was German, and shortly after the outbreak of World War I, in September 1914 (only days after he was honored by the British Government with an inscribed silver tray) he was dismissed from IMM. A 1916 article in the New York Times noted that while an American flagged ship, the Kroonland was under British control, and that his being dismissed marked him as being pro-German, and no other shipping companies would hire him. It further noted that Kreibohm was living in New York City and had been unable to find suitable work since his dismissal.

Kreibohm died in Antwerp on December 29, 1938.
