= Battle of Cárdenas =

Naval battle of Spanish-American War

- Part of the Spanish–American War
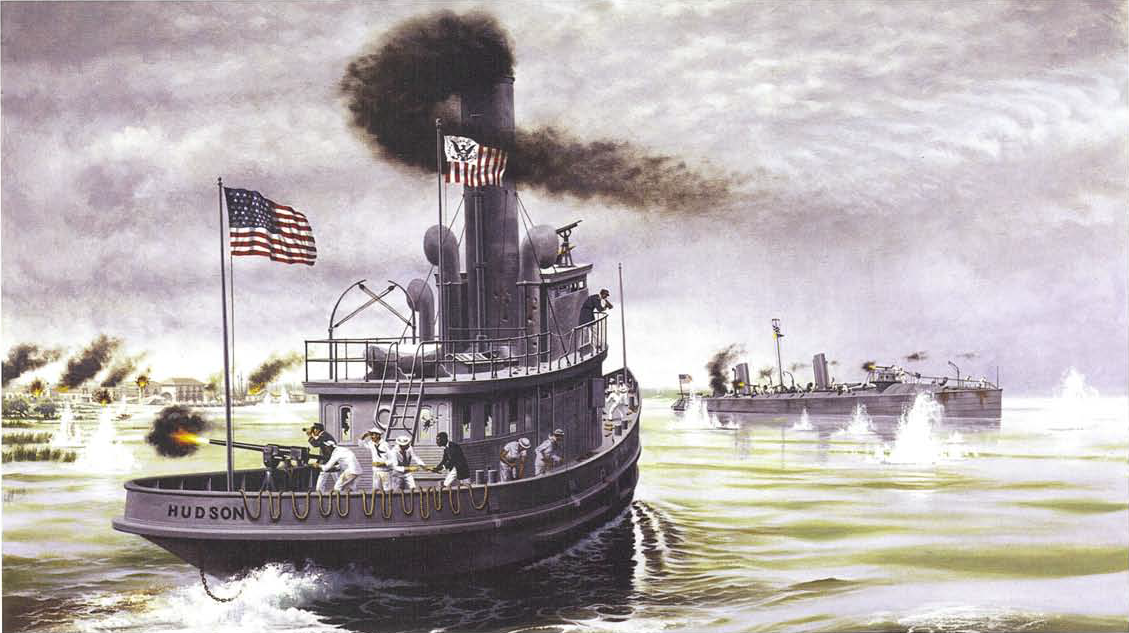
- USRC Hudson and USRC Winslow, Doug Ellis
Date	May 11, 1898
Location	Off Cárdenas, Caribbean Sea
Result	Spanish victory

Belligerents
Spain	United States

Commanders and leaders
Mariano Mateu; Antonio Rendón	John Bernadou; Frank Newcomb

Strength
2 gunboats 1 armed tug	2 torpedo boats 2 gunboats 1 cutter

Casualties and losses
1 wounded	5 killed 3 wounded 1 torpedo boat disabled 1 gunboat damaged

The Battle of Cárdenas was a minor naval engagement of the Spanish–American War fought on 11 May 1898 in the port of Cárdenas, Cuba, between an American squadron of 5 ships under Captain Chapman C. Todd and 3 small Spanish vessels under Mariano Mateu. The battle resulted in an unusually costly American reverse that dissuaded the U.S. Navy from undertaking further attacks on the port.

== Background ==
In May 1898, a small squadron of the United States Navy, consisting of the torpedo boats USS Foote and USS Winslow, the gunboats USS Wilmington and USS Machias, and the U.S. Revenue Cutter Hudson, was operating off the northern coast of Cuba. On May 11, 1898, this fleet entered the Bay of Cárdenas to destroy the three small Spanish gunboats reportedly moored in the harbor. Having swept the area for mines, Captain Todd ordered the Winslow to approach the shore and investigate a steamer moored alongside the wharf to determine whether the vessel was an enemy warship.

The Spanish squadron based on Cárdenas consisted of three ships: Ligera, Alerta and Antonio López, under the command of Teniente de Navío Mariano Mateu. The 42-ton Ligera, which had driven off Foote two weeks earlier in a fortuitous encounter off the harbour's mouth, was under Lieutenant Antonio Pérez Rendón, while Alerta, of the same tonnage, was under Lieutenant Pasquín. Both gunboats mounted a cannon of 42 mm and a Maxim of 37 mm. Antonio López was a small tug armed with a Nordenfelt gun, and under the command of Lieutenant Domingo Montes Reguefeiros. The Spanish Line had transferred the Antonio Lopez to the navy some years before.

== Battle ==
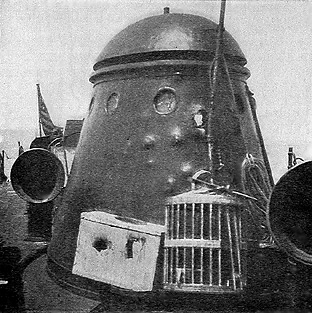
USS Winslow's conning tower, damaged from Spanish gunfire during the battle

By 13:35, Winslow reached a point approximately 1,500 yards from her quarry when a white puff of smoke from Antonio López's bow gun signaled the beginning of an artillery duel which lasted one hour and 20 minutes. Winslow responded with her 1-pounders. The Spanish concentrated their efforts on Winslow, and she soon received several direct hits. The first shot to score on the torpedo boat destroyed both her steam and manual steering gear. Her crew tried to rig an auxiliary steering system, but she swung broadside to the enemy and a shot pierced her hull near the engine room and knocked the port main engine out of commission. She maneuvered with her remaining engine to evade enemy fire and maintained a steady return fire with her 1-pounders. Wilmington and Hudson brought their guns to bear on the Spanish ship and shore, and the combined fire of the three American warships put the Spanish tugboat out of action while several waterfront buildings caught fire.

All but disabled, Winslow requested Hudson to tow her out of action. The revenue cutter approached the stricken torpedo boat and rigged a tow line between the two ships. As Hudson began to tow Winslow out to sea, one of the last Spanish shells to strike the torpedo boat hit her near the starboard gun and killed Ensign Worth Bagley who had been helping to direct the warship's maneuvers by carrying instructions from the deck to the base of the engine room ladder. Ensign Bagley became known as the first U.S. naval officer killed in the Spanish–American War, killed along with four other sailors, John Barberes, John Daniels, George B. Meek and E.B. Tunnell.

== Aftermath ==
Badly damaged, Winslow was towed clear of the action. Her commanding officer and several others in her crew were wounded. Lieutenant John Bernadou saw that the dead and wounded were transferred to Hudson, and he then left the ship after turning command over to Chief Gunner's Mate George P. Brady, who — along with Chief Gunner's Mate Hans Johnsen and Chief Machinist T. C. Cooney — later received the Medal of Honor.

Because at the time members of the Revenue Cutter Service were not eligible for the Navy Medal of Honor, Congress approved a special medal struck for them. Frank Newcomb, the commanding officer of Hudson, received the medal in gold, his officers received it in silver, and the enlisted crewmen in bronze. On the Spanish side, Teniente de Navío Montes, commander of the Antonio López, received the Laureate Cross of Saint Ferdinand.

The Spanish gunboat squadron, made of two steam launches and an armed tug, remained unscathed until the end of the war, when all the units were sold by the Spanish government.

Another outcome was the legal cases initiated due to the damage sustained to private property. The surrounding area of the battle, near the present-day resort town of Varadero, was noted as an elite community that was home to many Cuban aristocratic families of European descent and several took up cases with the post-war Spanish Treaty Committee to receive compensation for damage made to their homes or businesses. The most high-profile of the cases was that of the socialite and heiress Enriqueta García Martín and her husband, landowner Francisco E. Cazañas for damages to their Buena Vista estate grounds near the Bay of Cárdenas, which included extensive farmlands and a major sugar plantation. The couple was awarded a total of $13,138 (over $360,000 in 2020 when adjusted for inflation) by the US Secretary of the Treasury, the second highest sum awarded by the Spanish Treaty Committee and the most to any private citizen not representing a corporation.

== Order of battle ==
Spain

Gunboats

- Ligera
- Alerta

Armed tug

- Antonio López

United States

Gunboats

- USS Wilmington
- USS Machias

Torpedo boats

- USS Foote
- USS Winslow

Cutter

- USRC Hudson
