= John Horn Jr. =

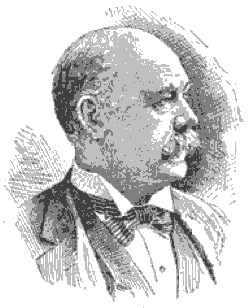
- Born: September 7, 1843; Sidmouth, England
- Died: April 12, 1920 (aged 76); Detroit, Michigan
- Occupation: Boatbuilder
- Spouse: Abbie Osborne (m. 1892)
- Awards: Congressional Gold Medal (1874)

John Horn Jr. (1843–1920) was an English-American boatbuilder who received a Congressional Gold Medal in 1874 for saving more than 100 people from drowning.

== Biography ==
John Horn Jr. was born in Sidmouth, England on September 7, 1843. About 1855, his family moved to Detroit, Michigan, where his father opened a restaurant.

Horn worked at his father's business, and later built, sold, and rented small boats. He also served as an alderman of Detroit.

He married Abbie Osborne on September 6, 1892.

He was awarded a Congressional Gold Medal in 1874 for "a long heroic career in which he rescued more than 100 people from drowning in the Detroit River, many of whom had fallen in while getting on and off ferryboats at the city wharf."

Horn later claimed that the medal was stolen from his house in October 1901, and he was unable to recover it. In previous instances, the Secretary of the Treasury had issued duplicate medals "at the expense of the applicants," upon the submission of absolute proof that showed "the originals had been irrecoverably lost or destroyed." Since such proof was absent in Horn's case, the congressional approval was necessary before a duplicate medal could be issued." Congress authorized a duplicate be made in 1904.

He died at his home in Detroit on April 12, 1920. At the time of his death he was credited with having saved 135 people from drowning.
