= USS Wilmington (PG-8) =

Gunboat of the United States Navy

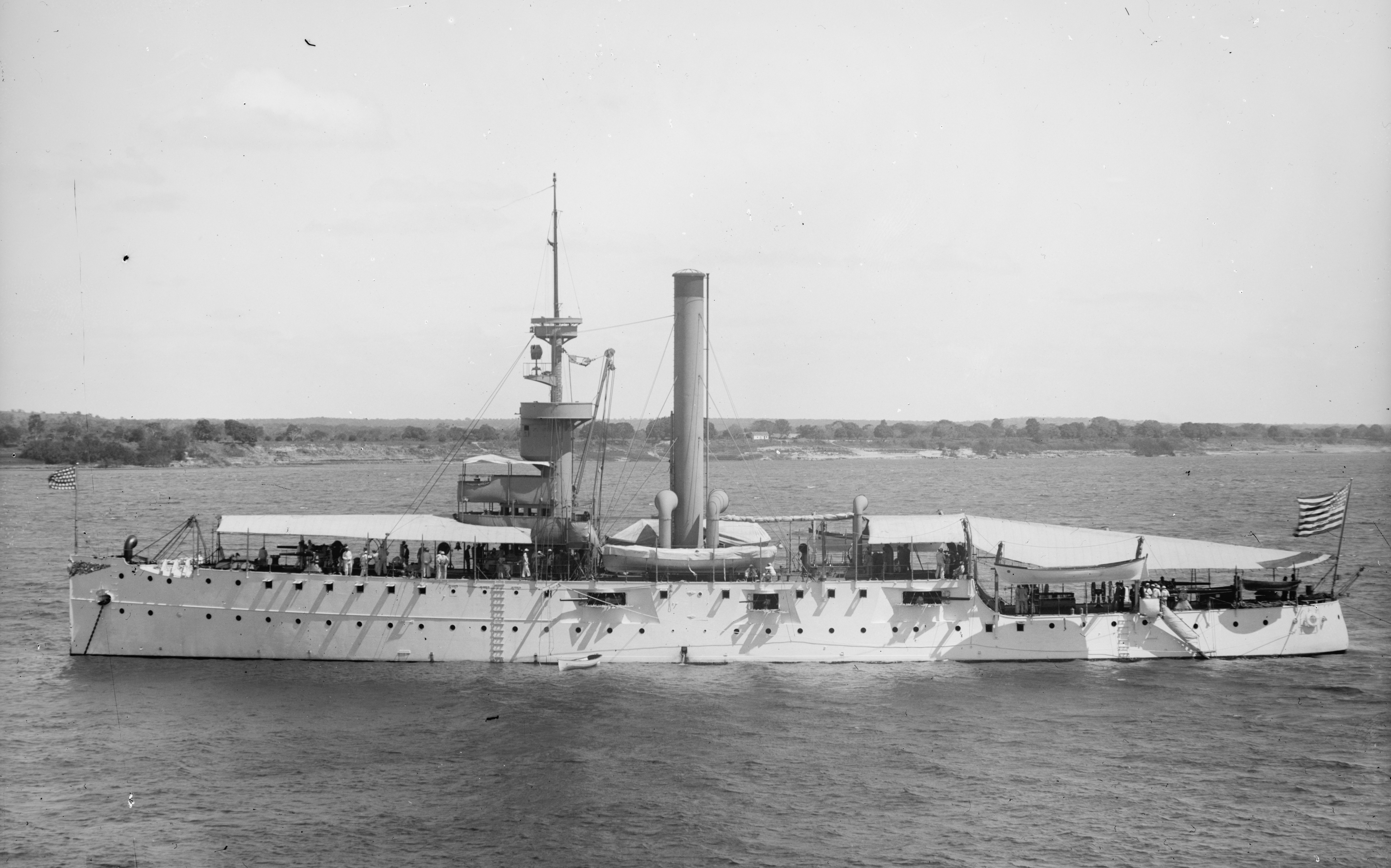
- USS Wilmington

History

United States
- Name: Wilmington
- Namesake: Wilmington, Delaware
- Builder: Newport News Shipbuilding Company, Newport News, Virginia
- Laid down: 8 October 1894
- Launched: 19 October 1895
- Commissioned: 13 May 1897
- Decommissioned: 20 December 1945
- Stricken: 8 January 1946
- Fate: Sold for scrap on 30 December 1946

General characteristics
- Class & type: Wilmington-class gunboat
- Displacement: 1,571 long tons (1,596 t)
- Length: 251 ft 10 in (76.8 m)
- Beam: 39 ft 8 in (12.1 m)
- Draft: 9 ft (2.7 m) (mean)
- Installed power: 1,988 ihp (1,482 kW)
- Propulsion: Four Hohenstein boilers, two 934ihp vertical triple expansion steam engines, two shafts 1921 - Four Babcock and Wilcox boilers.
- Speed: 13 kn (24 km/h; 15 mph)
- Range: 2,200 nmi (4,074 km; 2,532 mi) at 10 kn (19 km/h; 12 mph)
- Complement: 212
- Armament: Armament: Eight 4" gun mounts and four 3-pounders 1905 - Eight 4" rapid fire mounts, four 6-pounder rapid fire mounts, four 1-pounder rapid fire mounts and four 6mm mounts 1914 - Eight 4"/40 rapid fire mounts, and four 3-pounders World War II - One 5"/38 aft gun mount and Two bow 4"/50 gun mounts

USS Wilmington (PG-8) was the lead ship and one of two Wilmington-class gunboats built for the United States Navy. Wilmington was laid down in Newport News, Virginia, launched on October 19,1895 and commissioned on May 13, 1897. Named for Wilmington, Delaware, the ship served the navy for nearly fifty years, including tours in both the Spanish–American War and World War I. She was renamed Dover in 1941 and was mostly used for training and testing during World War II, before decommissioned in 1945.

== Service history ==
=== Pre-Spanish–American War ===
After conducting sea trials and training off the east coast and joined the North Atlantic Squadron at Key West, Wilmington trained and underwent exercises in gunnery and tactics in late 1897 and early 1898 as tension between the United States and Spain was rising steadily closer to open hostilities.

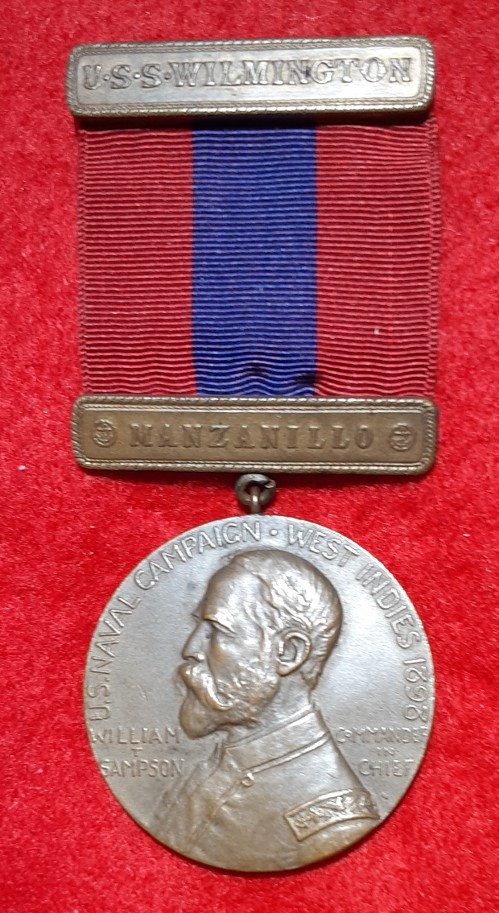

=== Spanish–American War ===
On 21 April 1898, two months after the sinking of the battleship Maine in Havana harbor, Cuba, the U.S. declared war on Spain. Meanwhile, the Navy had moved its warships into position to attack Spanish possessions in the Far East and in the Caribbean. On 11 May 1898, she participated in the Second Battle of Cardenas and was defeated but at the Bombardment of Cárdenas the next morning, she sank two Spanish gunboats and two schooners without a fight. On 15 July 1898, Wilmington arrived off Cape Cruz, near Manzanillo, Cuba, and joined Wompatuck on station with the blockading forces.

The following day, Wilmington overhauled two small charcoal-burning fishing boats off the harbor mouth and questioned their Cuban crews. From the brief interrogation, the Americans learned that a submarine cable connected Santa Cruz and Jucaro. The gunboat then proceeded to the spot mentioned by the fishermen and lowered a grappling hook. Finding the cable, Wilmington cut it and made for Cuarto Reales to join Helena, Wompatuck, and Hist.

On 17 July, Wilmington led the three other ships to El Guayabal, 20 mi (32 km) north of Manzanillo, Cuba, near Santa Cruz del Sur. Upon their arrival at Guayabal, the warships found Scorpion, Hornet, and Osceola. During the afternoon hours, the four commanding officers met in conference and formulated preliminary plans for an expedition to Manzanillo to destroy the Spanish shipping there.

Accordingly, at 03:00 on 18 July, the American ships set out from Guayabal and set course for Manzanillo. At 06:45, the group split up according to plan: Wilmington and Helena made for the north channel; Hist, Hornet, and Wompatuck for the south; Scorpion and Osceola for the central harbor entrance. Fifteen minutes later, the two largest ships entered the harbor with black smoke billowing from their tall funnels and gunners ready at their weapons.

Taking particular care not to damage the city beyond the waterfront, the American gunners directed their gunfire solely at the Spanish ships and took a heavy toll of the steamers congregated there. Spanish supply steamer Purissima Concepcion caught fire alongside a dock and sank at her moorings; gunboat Maria Ponton blew up when her magazines exploded; gunboats Estrella and Delgado Perrado also burned and sank while two transports, Gloria and Jose Garcia, went down as well. Two small gunboats, Guantanamo and Guardian were driven ashore and shot to pieces.

Beyond the effective range of Spanish shore batteries, the Americans emerged unscathed, leaving columns of smoke to mark the pyres of the enemy's supply and patrol vessels. The 20-minute engagement ended with the attackers withdrawing to sea to resume routine patrol duties with the North Atlantic Squadron for the duration of hostilities.

=== Pre-World War I ===
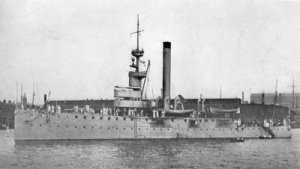
USS Wilmington.

Late in the summer, Wilmington headed home and was drydocked at Boston from 24 September-3 October. Following repairs, she departed the Massachusetts coast on 20 October, bound, via Charleston, South Carolina, for Norfolk. Arriving at Hampton Roads on 31 October, she put into the Norfolk Naval Shipyard on the following day for further repairs, overhaul, and preparation for foreign service.

With the reestablishment of the South Atlantic Squadron, Wilmington got underway on Christmas Eve and set her course for Puerto Rico. She arrived at San Juan on 30 December 1898, but she resumed her voyage south on 2 January 1899 and proceeded via Castries, Saint Lucia, to Port-of-Spain, Trinidad, where she made port on 15 January.

Six days later, Wilmington left Trinidad behind and pointed her straight stem toward Venezuela. On the 23rd, she arrived off Barima Point and stood up the Santa Catalina River, which led to the main branch of the Orinoco. After a brief stop at the town of Las Tablas, she put into Ciudad Bolívar on the 24th where the mayor, the American consul, and a number of city officials came on board the ship for a visit. Diplomatic affairs occupied the officers, with the commanding officer visiting the provincial governor and collector of customs. She was "full-dressed" with flags and appropriate ceremonial trappings on 28 January when she welcomed the citizens of the city on board. Two days later, the gunboat departed Ciudad Bolívar to return to Port-of-Spain.

She was based at Trinidad through February and into March. During this time, she visited Guanta in northern Venezuela; Georgetown, British Guiana; and proceeded up the Surinam River to Paramaribo, Dutch Guiana.

Departing Paramaribo on 6 March, Wilmington commenced the initial leg of her cruise up the Amazon River. Navigable for nearly 2,300 mi (3,700 km) of its 3,200 mi (5,100 km) length during the rainy season, the Amazon and its verdant banks presented the ship's company with interesting and unusual flora and fauna as she proceeded upriver. Calling at Pará and Manaus, Brazil, en route, the ship arrived at the Peruvian border at Leticia, Peru, on 11 April. Heaving-to, the gunboat dropped anchor off Leticia to secure permission from Peruvian authorities to proceed further up the Amazon. With permission granted, she again got underway and arrived at Iquitos on 13 April. While numerous official calls were exchanged during the visit, the gunboat also acquired a small menagerie: three monkeys and one tiger cat which were presented to the ship by the Peruvians.

On 18 April, Wilmington departed Iquitos, headed back down stream, and reached Rio de Janeiro on 28 May, completing a 4,600 mi (7,400 km) round-trip voyage on the Amazon. On 6 June, she entered the Brazilian government drydock at Rio de Janeiro for routine bottom cleaning and remained there until 4 July, when she got underway and cruised south along the coast visiting Brazilian and Uruguayan ports. She arrived at Montevideo on 16 July and spent one month operating out of that port.

On 17 August, she departed Montevideo. However, at 17:50 the following day, the port propeller shaft failed, resulting in a change of course back to Montevideo. After remaining in the Uruguayan port for the days following her arrival on 22 August, she departed on 3 September, steaming by her starboard engine only, for Buenos Aires.

Arriving on 4 September, Wilmington broke the Argentine flag at the main and her saluting guns barked out a 21-gun salute to the Argentine nation as she entered port. After the usual boarding calls and shore visits by the American officers to the American charge d'affairs and consul, the gunboat entered the drydock at Buenos Aires on 8 September.

Unshipping the port propeller shaft and landing the propeller and a section of the shaft on 16 September, she left the drydock the following day with the assistance of two tugs and proceeded to basin number 4 at the Brazilian navy yard.

Wilmington remained incapacitated at the basin until 18 January 1900, when she was moved to Ensenada, Argentina. Eleven days later, the cruiser Chicago passed a towline to the gunboat, and the two ships set out for Montevideo. On 9 February, steamship Corunda arrived with new shafts from the Brooklyn Navy Yard. Subsequently, the gunboat returned to Buenos Aires, under tow from the cruiser Montgomery, and entered drydock on 3 March 1900, nearly six months after having first been crippled by the damaged propeller shaft.

Once the repairs were finally corrected after dockyard overhaul and a trial period, Wilmington continued cruising on the South American station through the summer and early fall of 1900. While en route to Rio de Janeiro on 10 May 1900, her inclinometer recorded 45° rolls in each direction while traversing heavy, choppy seas. On 16 October, she departed Pernambuco, Brazil, bound for the Far East.

Arriving at Gibraltar on 3 November, she pushed on across the Mediterranean and transited the Suez Canal early in December, arriving at Port Said on the 4th. On 21 January 1901, the gunboat made port at Manila, in the Philippines, to commence her Asiatic service.

Departing from Cavite on 10 May, Wilmington headed for the China coast and called at Hong Kong on the 13th. Still nominally attached to the South Atlantic Fleet, she served in Chinese waters through 1904 on routine cruises showing the stars and stripes along the China coast at ports such as Shantou, Xiamen, Fuzhou, Shanghai, and Hong Kong. On 30 June 1904, she was decommissioned at Cavite.

On 2 April 1906, Wilmington was recommissioned there. For the next two years, she served off the China coast, carrying out her routine cruising and "showing the flag". On 17 December 1908, the gunboat commenced her river service, on the Yangtze River as far as Hankou, with the Yangtze Patrol. Ordinary activities included the usual calls and port visits to such places as Hong Kong, Canton, and Swatow. She conducted target practice after constructing her own target rafts and laying out a firing area. On one occasion, Chinese fishermen decided that the raft presented a good perch from which to fish. Repeated attempts by the gun-boaters to shoo away the fishermen only ended in frustration. Finally, as she steamed slowly toward the area, she fired a few blank rounds purposely "over", and the squatters promptly abandoned their erstwhile fishing vantage point.

After repairs while stationed at Hong Kong from 30 June 1912 – 30 June 1914, she resumed her routine cruises, attached to the Far Eastern Squadron, Asiatic Fleet, and continued such duty for the next five years.

=== World War I ===
On 7 April 1917, while at Shanghai, Wilmington received a cable informing the ship that Germany and the U.S. were at war. Events in the Atlantic had resulted in the severing of relations and the commencement of hostilities. In the Far East, the neutral Chinese greeted the news by issuing terms of internment to all belligerent shipping on 5 May. While the gunboats Palos, Monocacy, Quiros, Samar, and Villalobos were directed to stay and be interned, Wilmington got underway on the 6th, within the stated 48-hour limit, and made for the Philippines.

Arriving at Manila on 11 May, Wilmington moored alongside the cruiser Brooklyn. Proceeding first to Cavite and then to Olongapo City, she commenced patrol duties in the Philippine Islands, off Corregidor Island's north channel. Operating from Mariveles Bay, she cruised on patrol duty in the Manila Bay area through the fall of 1917, with occasional overhauls at Cavite. She helped to protect the Philippines for the duration of hostilities, intercepting and escorting various vessels entering Philippine waters while carrying out regular drills and exercises. She remained in the archipelago into February 1919, when she again steamed to Shanghai, China.

Wilmington remained at Shanghai as station ship from 11 February-24 June, when she got underway for Hankou. Five days later, the ship dropped anchor off the American consulate at that port. On 11 July, after weeks of official calls and routine business, she was fouled by a raft of logs; and two Chinese raftsmen fell overboard into the muddy river. She rescued the two men while other members of the crew proceeded to cut away the log raft.

=== Inter-war period ===
Wilmington continued routine patrol and "flag-showing" duties in 1919-1920 and into 1921. On 8 July 1921, the starboard propeller shaft parted, and the propeller was carried away. Proceeding on one engine, the ship finally arrived at Shanghai on 22 July and entered drydock. She operated on the Yangtze through December, when she headed south for duty along the China coast until heading to the Philippines where she operated into the late spring of 1922.

On 2 June of that year, the ship departed Olongapo and set her course for the east coast of the U.S. En route, she called at Singapore; Colombo, Ceylon; Bombay and Karachi; Aden, Arabia; Port Said, Egypt; Gibraltar; and Ponta Delgada, in the Azores. On 20 September 1922, the ship dropped anchor off the Portsmouth (N.H.) Navy Yard.

She remained there in an unassigned state until July 1923, when she was ordered to join the 3d Regiment, United States Navy Reserve Force, 9th Naval District, for the states of Ohio and Kentucky. After repairs and overhaul, Wilmington departed Portsmouth on 19 July, bound for Toledo, Ohio.

Wilmington anchored off Quebec, Canada, on the 25th and proceeded on toward Montreal on the following day, arriving on 27 July. After passing through the Soulanges and Cornwall Canals, she proceeded up the St. Lawrence River to Kingston, Canada, before setting course for the Welland Canal. After coaling at Port Colborne, she entered Lake Erie, stopped briefly at Cleveland, and arrived off Toledo on 1 August 1923.

Wilmington served as a training ship on Lake Erie— operating out of Toledo and calling at Cleveland and Buffalo—well into 1923. On 2 September of that year, she became inactive as her men were released from their training period. She remained in this state until 1 June 1924, when a large draft of reservists reported on board for training.

During that month, she operated in company with the gunboats Paducah, Dubuque, and the unclassified vessel Wilmette. On 10 June, the commanding officer, 7 officers, and 55 men left the ship at Cleveland to participate in a parade in conjunction with the Republican Party's national convention. The following day, Secretary of the Navy Curtis D. Wilbur came on board to inspect the gunboat.

Wilmington remained as training vessel on the Great Lakes for reservists through the 1930s, occasionally calling at Chicago, as well as her normal ports of call – Toledo, Buffalo, and Cleveland. During the winter months, she was laid up at her home base in preparation for spring and summer cruising.

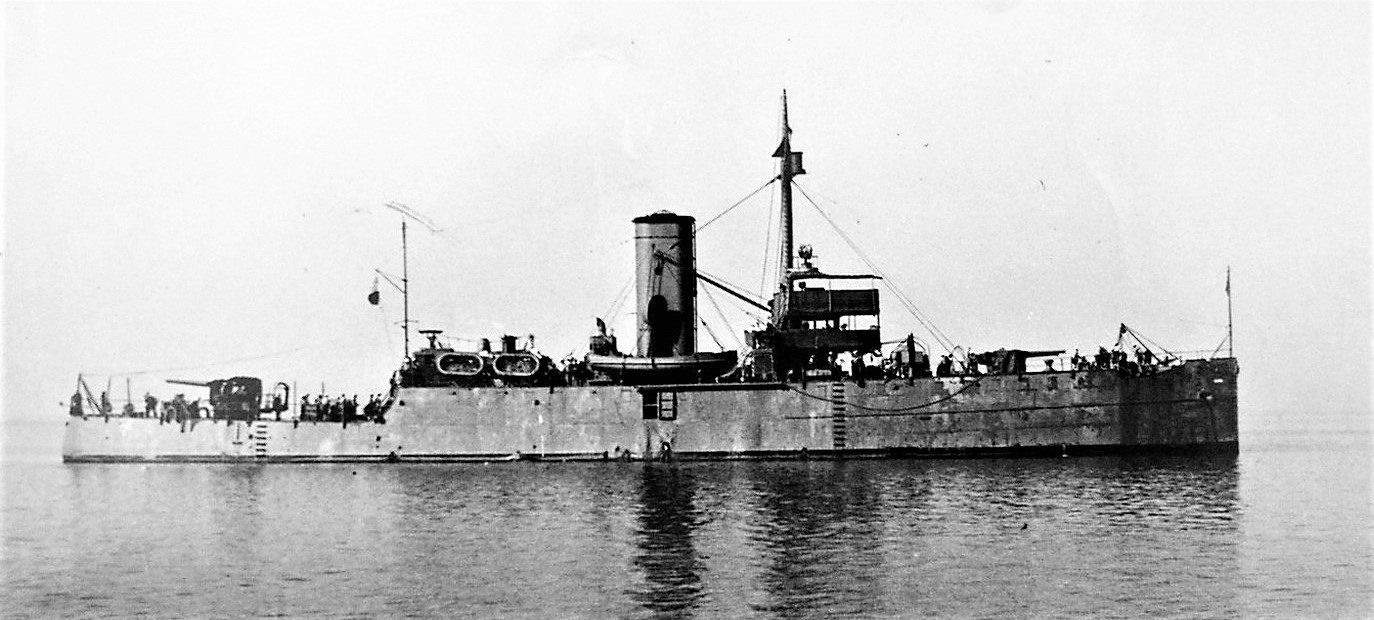
USS Dover IX-30 WWII

On July 3, 1934 "Wilmington" carried the Parliamentary Mace of Upper Canada to Toronto, Ontario. The Mace had been taken as a war prize by American forces in the April 1813 attack on York during the War of 1812, and had been on display at the US Naval Academy in Annapolis. As a goodwill gesture between the two countries, President Franklin D Roosevelt ordered the Mace's return to Canada, which was done by "Wilmington" between the two dates of Canadian (July 1) and American (July 4) independence. The Mace is now on display at the Ontario Parliament buildings in Toronto, Ontario.

=== World War II ===
On 27 January 1941, Wilmington was designated IX-30 and renamed Dover. Based at Toledo, Ohio, the ship cruised on Lake Erie between Toledo and Cleveland until the autumn of 1942, when she headed down the St. Lawrence River toward the Atlantic. She arrived at Quebec on 24 November and began voyage repairs and received a 5 in (38Cal) gun which was installed aft. Dover departed Quebec on 17 December and reached the Gut of Canso the next day.

The Dover operated in the vicinity of Canso and Gaspe Bay from 18 December 1942 and put into Halifax, Nova Scotia, on Christmas Eve. On Christmas Day, 1942, Dover escorted Convoy HF-24 out of the harbor, set course for Boston, and arrived with her charges at the Massachusetts port on 27 December.

USS Dover IX-30 daily report of her Decommissioning.

Following this duty, she put into New York, where she remained until 27 January 1943, at which date she turned her bow south and headed for the warmer climes of the gulf coast. Arriving at Miami on 1 February, she soon departed and made port at Gulfport, Mississippi, three days later.

The Dover now assigned to Eighth Naval District, at New Orleans, La., Gulfport Armed Guard Training School (16) served as an armed guard training ship of the 5in. Gun and smaller calibers and also served as a floating laboratory for the students in the Basic Engineering School until April when the school was disestablished on 14-Dec-44.

The Dover was then reassigned to Twelfth Naval District, at Treasure Island San Francisco, California USNR Armed Guard Center (Pacific).

The Armed Guard Center at Treasure Island had been designated as one of the three schools to give the 5"/38 maintenance course for petty officers. By the end of 1944 more men were being trained in this course at Treasure Island than at any other school. This training followed the Shelton pattern, with instruction not only in the 5"/38 but also in the operation and upkeep of the gasoline or diesel generators which were frequently necessary to furnish power for the operation of the gun. The monthly quota for the 5"/38 maintenance course was set at 60 on 24 July 1944. In addition, 40 gunner's mates were given a general gun maintenance course each month and 10 a week were sent to San Diego to act as leading petty officers until each had completed a month in training two gun crews. These petty officers were then returned to the center for further duty afloat.

Records indicate that 84 officers and 3,370 enlisted men were given refresher training in surface firing aboard the Dover in the San Francisco area.

The Dover continued in the Training of the Armed Guard Gun Crews at Treasure Island until the end of the war.

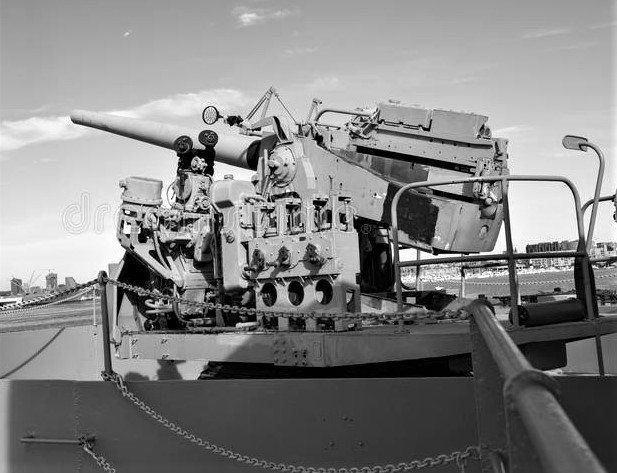
Example of a 5”/38cal Gun installed on the Dover.

Decommissioned on 20 December 1945, she was stricken from the Navy List on 8 January 1946 and sold for scrap on 30 December 1946.

The USS Wilmington / USS Dover served for 59 years as a commissioned ship of the United States Navy.

=== Post World War II ===
The Dover was sold to the San Francisco Barge Company, and in early 1947 they used her to raise a sunken tug off Hunter's Point Naval Shipyard. After raising the hulk the gunboat carried it out to sea, where both tug and gunboat were to be sunk together.

Attached to the right is an article from the “All Hands” 1956 November issue recounting the event.

Article from the “All Hands” 1956 November issue

== Awards ==
- Sampson Medal
- Spanish Campaign Medal
- Philippine Campaign Medal
- World War I Victory Medal
- American Defense Service Medal
- American Campaign Medal
- World War II Victory Medal
