= Frank H. Newcomb =

United States Coast Guard commodore (1846–1934)

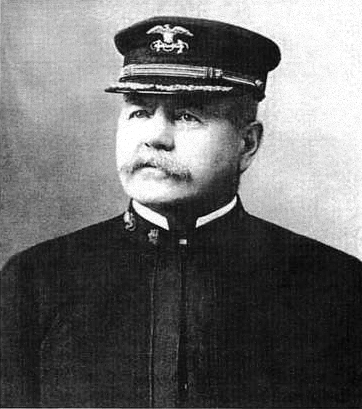
- Born: Frank Hamilton Newcomb; 10 November 1846; Boston, Massachusetts, U.S.
- Died: 20 February 1934 (aged 87) Los Angeles, California, U.S.
- Branch: United States Navy (USN); U.S. Revenue Cutter Service (USRCS)
- Service years: 1863–1865 (USN); 1873–1910 (USRCS)
- Rank: Commodore
- Commands: USRC Hudson
- Conflicts: Spanish–American War; Second Battle of Cárdenas
- Awards: Cardenas Medal
- Spouse: Rose Prioleau Newcomb

Frank Hamilton Newcomb (10 November 1846 – 20 February 1934) was a United States Revenue Cutter Service commodore, best known for his actions at the Battle of Cárdenas during the Spanish–American War.

== Early life and education ==
Newcomb was born in Boston, Massachusetts on 10 November 1846, the oldest of three children. His father, Hiram Newcomb was a merchant sea captain and Frank sailed on his father's ship at an early age. At the age of sixteen he served on another merchant ship that made an around the world trading voyage.

== Career ==
=== U.S. Navy ===
In 1863 at the age of 17, Newcomb received a U.S. Navy officer's appointment as acting master's mate aboard the mortar schooner USS Para. As a part of the Atlantic Blockading Squadron during the American Civil War, Para served through many engagements. In early 1865, Newcomb was transferred to USS Arethusa, which was a coaling vessel home-ported at Port Royal, South Carolina. At the conclusion of the war, Newcomb resigned from the Navy and attempted to make a living as a merchant and as an officer on a merchant ship. He made trips to Europe and the West Coast, but due to a decline in United States merchant shipping after the war he was not able to make a living as a merchant mariner. In 1869, he began working for the Alabama and Chattanooga Railroad and later the Atchison, Topeka, and Santa Fe Railroad.

=== U.S. Revenue Cutter Service ===
Desiring to return to a sea career, Newcomb applied for and received a commission in the United States Revenue Cutter Service. He was commissioned as a third lieutenant on 8 March 1873 and assigned initially to USRC Petrel. (Note: Third Lieutenant was the U.S. Revenue Cutter Service rank equivalent to an Ensign in the U.S. Navy or U.S. Coast Guard.) Petrel was sold on 21 October 1873 and Newcomb was transferred to USRC W.H. Crawford, reporting aboard 25 November 1873. Newcomb was transferred to USRC Andrew Johnson based at Milwaukee, Wisconsin in June 1876. He was promoted to second lieutenant on 25 March 1878. (Note: Second Lieutenant was the U.S. Revenue Cutter Service rank equivalent to a Lieutenant (Junior Grade) in the U.S. Navy or U.S. Coast Guard.) In 1879, Newcomb was appointed as an assistant inspector for the United States Life-Saving Service by USLSS superintendent Sumner I. Kimball. While he served in this capacity he was placed in charge of USRC Saville based in Elizabeth City, North Carolina, and he used the boat to aid in inspecting USLSS stations in south Virginia and North Carolina. The senior inspector, Lieutenant Charles F. Shoemaker and Newcomb helped establish an all black crew located on North Carolina's Outer Banks at Pea Island because some of the white crews didn't want to serve in mixed race crews. Newcomb appointed a locally recognized surfman, Richard Etheridge as the Pea Island Life-Saving Station head keeper. On 1 July 1885, he was assigned to USRC Colfax. On 7 December 1886, he began serving on USRC Gallatin. On 7 November 1889, Newcomb was transferred to USRC Dallas. On 16 May 1891 Newcomb was promoted to first lieutenant. (Note: First Lieutenant was the U.S. Revenue Cutter Service rank equivalent to a Lieutenant in the U.S. Navy or U.S. Coast Guard.) (Note: It is unknown what duty stations Newcomb was assigned after he left Dallas until he reported as commanding officer of Hudson in 1897. One source mentions continuous service on various cutters on the Atlantic and Pacific coasts as well as Alaska for at least part of the period.)

==== Spanish–American War ====
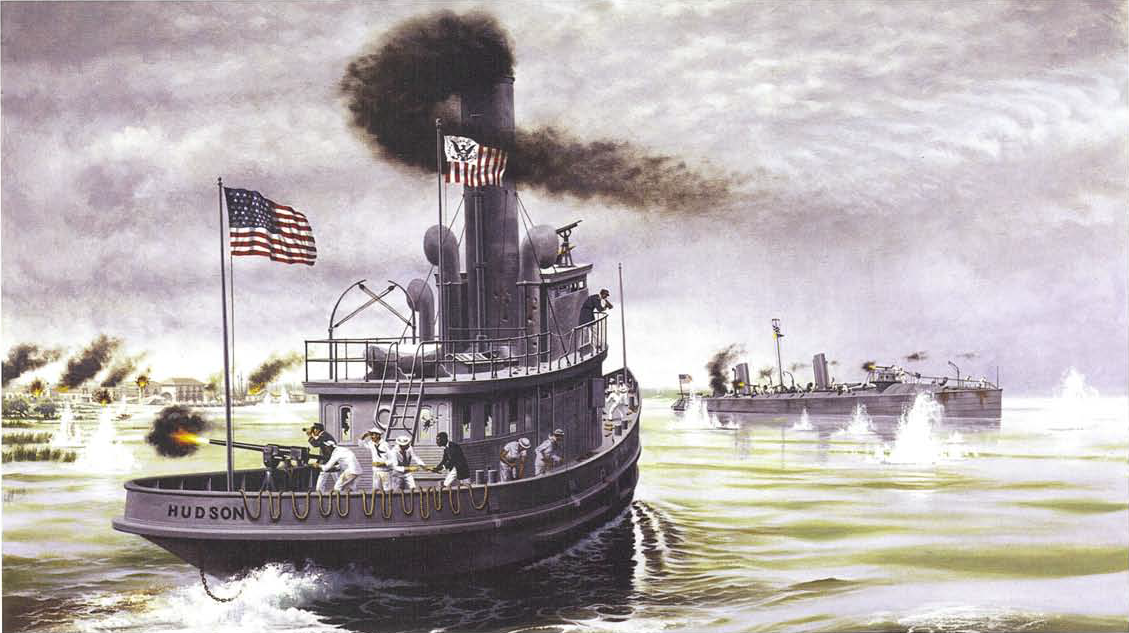
USRC Hudson, led by Newcomb, moves to assist a disabled USS Winslow during the Second Battle of Cárdenas.

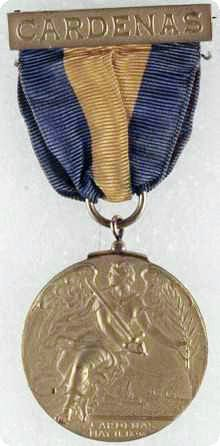
The Cardenas Medal

As a first lieutenant, Newcomb reported aboard USRC Hudson in September 1897 as the commanding officer. Hudson was homeported at New York City's harbor at that time. Newcomb received orders assigning Hudson to the Navy and to report to Norfolk, Virginia, for outfitting because of the growing tensions with Spain over the sinking of the USS Maine on 15 February 1898. Although more of a tugboat than a combat vessel, Hudson was equipped at Norfolk Naval Shipyard with two six-pound rapid fire guns fore and aft and a Colt automatic machine gun on the aft deckhouse. She also received 5/8 inch (16 mm).) armor plating around the pilothouse and deckhouse. (Note: Hudson was a 94 ft 6 in (28.80 m) cutter of a tugboat design displacing 128 tons. She was the Revenue Cutter Service's first steel-hulled cutter and was the first to be powered by a triple-expansion reciprocating steam engine. She was crewed by five officers, two warrant officers, and sixteen enlisted in 1898.) On 23 April, Hudson departed Norfolk with orders to report to the staging area for Cuban operations at Key West, Florida. War with Spain had been declared 21 April while the cutter was in the shipyard.

On 11 May 1898, in one of the first actions off the coast of Cuba, Newcomb distinguished himself and his ship in the Battle of Cárdenas. The U.S. Navy torpedo boat USS Winslow and USRC Hudson had been shelling Spanish positions. Winslow had been hit multiple times. Half her complement was dead or wounded and her captain gravely wounded. Newcomb ordered Hudson to tow Winslow out of harm's way. Under heavy fire, she did just that, despite nearly foundering on shoals trying to fasten a line to Hudson. Newcomb's actions saved Winslow from destruction and possible capture. After the action at Cárdenas, Hudson patrolled the waters near Cárdenas Bay, capturing three vessels carrying stores while destroying a fourth. Newcomb and the crew of Hudson returned to her homeport of New York City in mid-August 1898 and a rousing welcome and a recommendation by President William McKinley to Congress to issue a gold medal for Newcomb, silver medals for his officers, and bronze medals for his enlisted crew.

Executive Mansion

June 27, 1898

To The Congress of the United States:

On the 11th of May, 1898, there occurred a conflict in the Bay of Cardenas, Cuba, in which the naval torpedo boat Winslow was disabled, her commander wounded, and one of her officers and a part of her crew killed by the enemy's fire.

In the face of a most galling fire from the enemy's guns the revenue cutter Hudson, commanded by First Lieutenant Frank H. Newcomb, United States Revenue-Cutter Service, rescued the disabled Winslow, her wounded commander, and the remaining crew. The commander of the Hudson kept his vessel in the very hottest fire of the action, although in constant danger of going ashore on account of the shallow water, until he finally got a line made fast to the Winslow and towed that vessel out of range of the enemy's guns, a deed of special gallantry.

I recommend that, in recognition of the signal act of heroism of First Lieutenant Frank H. Newcomb, United States Revenue-Cutter Service, above set forth, the thanks of Congress be extended to him and to his officers and men of the Hudson; and that a gold medal of honor be presented to Lieutenant Newcomb, a silver medal of honor to each of his officers, and a bronze medal of honor to each member of his crew who served with him at Cardenas.

WILLIAM McKINLEY

A joint resolution by Congress carried out the president's wishes and medals were struck for Newcomb, his officers and men. Newcomb received the only gold medal awarded by Congress for participation in the Spanish–American War. (Note: Three members of the crew of Winslow received the Medal of Honor for their actions at Cárdenas. Receiving Medals of Honor were Navy sailors, Chief Gunners Mate George F. Brady, Chief Machinist Thomas C. Cooney, and Chief Machinist Hans Johnsen.)

=== Later USRCS service ===
After Newcomb's return to New York and the receipt of the Cardenas Medal, he was awarded seven additional points on the Revenue Cutter Service's promotion system which helped him get promoted to captain in 1902. (Note: Captain was the U.S. Revenue Cutter Service rank equivalent to a Commander in the U.S. Navy or U.S. Coast Guard.) He later served as the Supervisor of Anchorages for New York Harbor, and Superintendent of Construction of Life-Saving Stations for the Atlantic Coast and Great Lakes. On 8 May 1908 he was promoted to the rank of senior captain. (Note: Senior Captain was the U.S. Revenue Cutter Service rank equivalent to a Captain in the U.S. Navy or U.S. Coast Guard.) At age 64, Newcomb reached mandatory retirement age and he retired with the rank of captain-commandant on 10 November 1910. (Note: Captain-Commandant was the U.S. Revenue Cutter Service rank that would have been equivalent to a Commodore in the U.S. Navy or U.S. Coast Guard. Although Newcomb never served as Commandant of the Revenue Cutter Service, it was the only rank that he could be promoted to upon his retirement as the RCS was not authorized a rank of commodore at the time.)

== Later life and death ==
In 1927, Newcomb received the rank of commodore on the U.S. Coast Guard Retired List. Newcomb died of natural causes at Los Angeles, California, on 19 February 1934. He is interred at Arlington National Cemetery with his wife, Rose Prioleau Newcomb (1863–1951.

== Legacy ==
The United States Navy destroyer USS Newcomb (DD-586) was named in his honor.

In 2014, the Coast Guard's Command and Operations School renamed its "Top Conn" award to the Newcomb award. It is awarded to the graduate of each Prospective Commanding Officer / Prospective Executive Officer class that best demonstrates the excellence in leadership, mentorship, and inspiration exemplified by Newcomb.

== Notes ==
Footnotes

Citations

References cited

- "Record of Movements, Vessels of the United States Coast Guard, 1790–December 31, 1933 (1989 reprint)" (PDF). U.S. Coast Guard, Department of Transportation.
- Canney, Donald L. (1995). U.S. Coast Guard and Revenue Cutters, 1790–1935. Naval Institute Press, Annapolis, Maryland. ISBN 978-1-55750-101-1.
- Evans, Stephen H. (1949). The United States Coast Guard 1790–1915: A Definitive History. Naval Institute Press, Annapolis, Maryland.
- King, Irving H. (1996). The Coast Guard Expands, 1865–1915: New Roles, New Frontiers. Naval Institute Press, Annapolis, Maryland. ISBN 978-1-55750-458-6.
- Larzelere, Alex (2003). The Coast Guard in World War I: An Untold Story. Naval Institute Press, Annapolis, Maryland. ISBN 978-1-55750-476-0.
- Noble (1990), Dennis L. "Historical Register U.S. Revenue Cutter Service Officers, 1790–1914" (PDF). Coast Guard Personnel. U.S. Coast Guard Historian's Office.
- Thiesen, William H. (Summer 2010). "The Fighting Captain of the United States Revenue Cutter Service" (PDF). The Daybook. 14 (4). Hampton Roads, Virginia: Hampton Roads Naval Museum. Archived from the original (PDF) on 19 December 2015.
