= Congressional Gold Medal =

Joint-highest civilian award in the United States

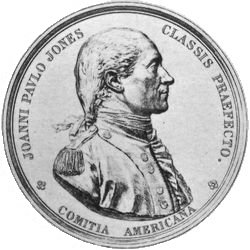
- Etching of medal awarded to John Paul Jones, the only Continental Navy officer to be awarded a gold medal
- Type: Civilian award
- Awarded for: "National appreciation for distinguished achievements and contributions by individuals or institutions".
- Country: United States of America
- Presented by: United States Congress
- First award: 1776

Highlights
- Total recipients: 184

The Congressional Gold Medal is the oldest and joint-highest civilian award in the United States, alongside the Presidential Medal of Freedom. It is bestowed by vote of the United States Congress, signed into law by the president. The Gold Medal expresses the highest national appreciation for distinguished achievements and contributions by individuals or institutions.

The congressional practice of issuing gold medals to occasionally honor recipients began with members of the military during the American Revolution. The practice soon extended to individuals in all walks of life and in the late 20th century also to groups. The congressional medal honors those, individually or as a group, "who have performed an achievement that has an impact on American history and culture that is likely to be recognized as a major achievement in the recipient's field long after the achievement."

There is no general statutory scheme for creation of the award. When a Congressional Gold Medal is deemed appropriate, Congress provides for the creation of each medal by passing a law to that effect. Each chamber of Congress (the House and the Senate) imposes super-majority sponsorship rules to begin consideration. Each medal is ordered to be uniquely designed and cast in gold by the United States Mint. Thus, there are significantly fewer gold medals than presidential medals. U.S. citizenship is not a requirement. As of November 29, 2023, 184 people, events, or institutions have been awarded a Congressional Gold Medal.

== History ==
Since the American Revolution, Congress has commissioned gold medals as its highest expression of national appreciation for distinguished achievements and contributions. The medal was first awarded in 1776 by the Second Continental Congress to General George Washington. Although the first recipients were military figures who participated in the American Revolution, the War of 1812 and the Mexican–American War, Congress broadened the scope of the medal to include actors, authors, entertainers, musicians, pioneers in aeronautics and space, explorers, lifesavers, notables in science and medicine, athletes, humanitarians, public servants, and foreign recipients. The medal is normally awarded to persons, but in 1979 the American Red Cross became the first organization to be honored with a gold medal.

As of 2021, at least seven people had been awarded more than one gold medal: Winfield Scott (1814 for the War of 1812 and 1848 for the Mexican–American War), Zachary Taylor (1846, 1847, and 1848 for the Mexican–American War), Lincoln Ellsworth (1928 and 1936 for polar exploration), Hyman G. Rickover (1958 for the "Nuclear Navy" and 1982 for his entire career), Staff Sergeant Warner Katz (Office of Strategic Services and Merrill's Marauders WW2 also the first Merrill's Marauder to kill a Japanese soldier), Ranger Randall Ching and Ranger Raymond Lee (2020 for serving in WW2 as a Chinese-American and 2022 for serving as a US army ranger).

== Process of awarding ==
A difference between a Congressional Gold Medal and a Presidential Medal of Freedom is that the Presidential Medal of Freedom is awarded in the discretion of the president of the United States, while Congressional Gold Medals are awarded by an Act of Congress which becomes law.

Per committee rules, legislation bestowing a Congressional Gold Medal upon a recipient must be co-sponsored by two-thirds of the membership of both the House of Representatives and the Senate before their respective committees—the House Committee on Financial Services and the Senate Committee on Banking, Housing, and Urban Affairs—will consider it.

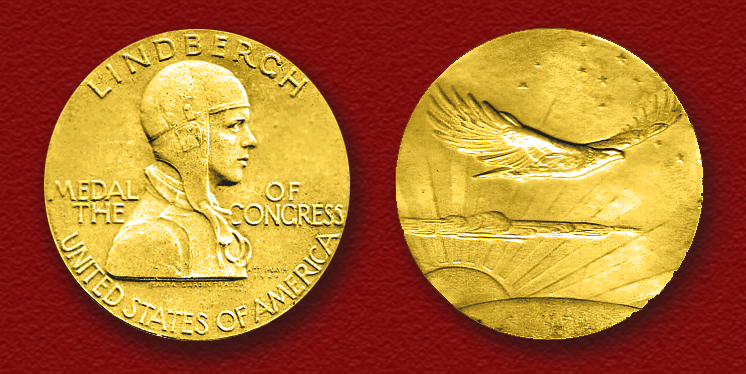
Medal awarded to Charles A. Lindbergh in 1930

A Congressional Gold Medal is designed by the United States Mint to specifically commemorate the person and achievement for which the medal is awarded. Medals are therefore different in appearance, and there is no standard design. Congressional Gold Medals are considered non-portable, meaning that they are not meant to be worn on a uniform or other clothing, but rather displayed.

In rare instances, miniature versions have been made or converted for wear on clothing, suspended from a ribbon. Examples are the Cardenas Medal for Frank H. Newcomb, the Jarvis Medal for David H. Jarvis, the Jeannette Medal for the men of the Jeannette expedition, the Byrd Antarctic Expedition Medal for the men of the First Byrd expedition of 1928–1930, and the NC-4 Medal for the men who completed the first transatlantic flight in May 1919. The latter was authorized in 1935 by Pub. L. 74–43 allowing the Secretary of the Navy to authorize—at his discretion—the wearing of commemorative or other special awards on Navy or Marine Corps uniforms, in military-sized form.

Often, bronze versions of the medals are struck for sale by the U.S. Mint, and may be available in both larger and smaller sizes. In at least one case, the John Wayne Congressional Medal, private dealers bought large numbers of the bronze version. They were then gold plated and resold to the public for a significant profit.

The Congressional Gold Medal is distinct from the Medal of Honor, a military decoration for extreme bravery in action, and from the Congressional Space Medal of Honor, presented by NASA for extraordinary accomplishment in United States space exploration.

== See also ==
- Awards and decorations of the United States government
- Congressional Silver Medal
- Congressional Bronze Medal
- Thanks of Congress
