= List of shipwrecks in February 1942 =

The list of shipwrecks in February 1942 includes all ships sunk, foundered, grounded, or otherwise lost during February 1942.

== 1 February ==
List of shipwrecks: 1 February 1942
Ship	State	Description
Absirtea	Italy	World War II: The cargo ship was torpedoed and sunk in the Adriatic Sea six nautical miles (11 km; 6.9 mi) northwest of Cape Dukato, Albania (37°50′N 15°29′E) by HMS Thunderbolt (Royal Navy). There were two dead and 35 survivors.
Bordeaux Maru	Imperial Japanese Navy	World War II: Marshalls-Gilberts raids: The Nanman Maru-class transport ship was bombed or torpedoed and sunk at the Wotje Atoll, Marshall Islands (9°27′N 170°13′E) by Douglas SBD Dauntless and Douglas TBD Devastator aircraft from USS Enterprise (United States Navy). A gunner and two crewmen were killed.
Hardhausen	Norway	World War II: The motorboat was shelled and sunk in Ofotfjorden off Tjeldodden by German shore-based artillery with the loss of two of her crew.
Kashima Maru	Imperial Japanese Navy	World War II: Marshalls-Gilberts raids: The Fukuei Maru No. 10-class auxiliary netlayer was bombed of torpedoed and sunk one mile (1.6 km) off the Wotje Atoll (9°27′N 170°13′E) by Douglas SBD Dauntless and Douglas TBD Devastator aircraft from USS Enterprise (United States Navy).
Shonan Maru No. 10 Go	Imperial Japanese Navy	World War II: The auxiliary submarine chaser was sunk off the Wotje Atoll by gunfire from USS Dunlap (United States Navy).
Tacoma Star	United Kingdom	World War II: The cargo ship was torpedoed and sunk in the Atlantic Ocean (37°33′N 69°21′W) by U-109 (Kriegsmarine) with the loss of all 97 of her crew.
Toyotsu Maru	Imperial Japanese Navy	World War II: Marshalls-Gilberts raids: The auxiliary gunboat was shelled and sunk off the Wotje Atoll by USS Northampton and USS Salt Lake City (both United States Navy). Seventeen of her crew were killed.
Walter Ohlrogge	Nazi Germany	World War II: The cargo ship was sunk by a mine off the west coast of Norway.

== 2 February ==
List of shipwrecks: 2 February 1942
Ship	State	Description
HMT Cape Spartel	Royal Navy	World War II: The naval trawler was bombed and sunk in the North Sea 7.5 nautical miles (13.9 km) south west of the North Outer Dowsing Lightship ( Trinity House) (53°28′42″N 0°49′12″E) by Luftwaffe aircraft.
HMT Cloughton Wyke	Royal Navy	World War II: The Mersey-class minesweeping naval trawler was bombed and sunk in the North Sea (52°59′00″N 1°18′30″E) by Luftwaffe aircraft with four of her crew were killed and her captain, wounded.
Lisbon Maru	Imperial Japanese Army	World War II: The Lyons Maru-class transport ship was damaged by a Japanese mine while departing Mako, Formosa, and was beached with the loss of nineteen lives. She was refloated on 24 March. In May the vessel was towed to Hong Kong, and then Singapore for repairs. She returned to service on 15 September.
USS Magdelena	United States Navy	World War II: The yard ferry was destroyed by enemy action at Mariveles, Luzon, Philippines.
HNLMS OJR-2, and HNLMS OJR-3	Royal Netherlands Navy	The OJR-1-class anti-submarine boats were destroyed in a fire at Soerabaja, Netherlands East Indies.
Tamagawa Maru	Imperial Japanese Army	World War II: The Shinko Maru-class auxiliary transport ship was torpedoed and sunk in the South China Sea off Cape Bolinao, Philippines (17°16′N 119°48′E) by USS Seadragon (United States Navy) with the loss of 48 lives.
U-581	Kriegsmarine	World War II: The Type VIIC submarine was depth charged and sunk in the Faial Channel 6 kilometers (3.2 nmi) southwest of Pico Island in the Azores (39°00′N 30°00′W) by HMS Westcott (Royal Navy) with the loss of four of her 45 crew. Her commanding officer swam to shore and returned to Germany via Spain.
W. L. Steed	United States	World War II: The tanker was torpedoed, shelled and sunk in the Atlantic Ocean 90 nautical miles (170 km) off the mouth of the Delaware River (38°25′N 73°00′W) by U-103 (Kriegsmarine) with the eventual loss of 34 of her 38 crew. Survivors were rescued by HMS Alcantara (Royal Navy) three on 4 February, Hartlepool (United Kingdom) two on 6 February with one dying on 10 February, and Raby Castle (United Kingdom) rescued one, but he died on 15 February.
W-9	Imperial Japanese Navy	World War II: The W-7-class minesweeper was sunk by a mine in Ambon Bay (03°42′S 128°10′E).

== 3 February ==
List of shipwrecks: 3 February 1942
Ship	State	Description
Amerikaland	Sweden	World War II: The ore carrier was torpedoed and sunk in the Atlantic Ocean off the east coast of the United States (36°36′N 74°10′W) by U-106 (Kriegsmarine) with the loss of five of her 39 crew. Survivors were rescued by Castor (Netherlands), Port Halifax (United Kingdom) and Taubate ( Brazil).
Hermann	Nazi Germany	World War II: The auxiliary schooner was sunk by Royal Navy motor torpedo boats.
Katong	United Kingdom	World War II: The cargo ship was bombed and sunk by Japanese aircraft west of Palembang, Netherlands East Indies with the loss of all but five of her crew.
Loch Ranza	United Kingdom	World War II: The cargo ship was bombed and damaged south of Singapore (0°37′N 104°14′E) by Japanese aircraft. She was beached at Pulau Abang whilst burning and exploded. Of a crew of 50, including nine gunners, and four Royal Air Force passengers, five crew were killed. The survivors were taken to Palembang byr Subadar (United Kingdom). One crewman and one gunner died later, and two crew were taken prisoner.
Napoli	Italy	World War II: The cargo ship was torpedoed and damaged in the Mediterranean Sea about 30 nautical miles (56 km) east of Sousse, Tunisia by HMS Umbra (Royal Navy). Napoli was towed and then beached the next day at (35°27′N 11°03′E). Her crew were rescued. She was destroyed by aircraft on 11 February.
Norah Moller	United Kingdom	World War II: The cargo liner with refugees from Singapore via Java, Netherlands East Indies, was bombed and sunk in the Bangka Strait by Japanese aircraft. Fifty-seven women and children survivors, 28 of whom were wounded, were rescued by HMAS Hobart (Royal Australian Navy) and thirteen of the ship's crew were rescued by HMS Tenedos (Royal Navy). There were 57 casualties.
Pinna	United Kingdom	World War II: The tanker was bombed and damaged south of Singapore, off Sumatra, Netherlands East Indies (0°52′S 104°19′E) by Japanese aircraft. She was attacked again the next day and was beached and abandoned with the loss of 20 of the 53 people aboard. Survivors were rescued by Subadar (United Kingdom), and later made prisoners of war.
Q-114 Danday	United States Army	World War II: The Philippine Army Thornycroft 65-foot-class motor torpedo boat, serving with the United States Army Forces in the Far East was bombed and destroyed in Manila Bay near Lamao, Limay by Japanese aircraft. There were no casualties as the crew was taking lunch onshore.
SKA-0111	Soviet Navy	The torpedo boat collided with the minesweeper Zashchitnik (Soviet Navy) and was severely damaged. She put back to Gelendzhik.
Schleswig-Holstein	Nazi Germany	World War II: The coaster was sunk by Royal Navy motor torpedo boats.
Subadar	United Kingdom	World War II: The cargo ship was bombed and damaged by Japanese aircraft in the Berhala Strait, Dutch East Indies and was beached. She was refloated and arrived at Palembang on 11 February.
Talthybius	United Kingdom	The cargo liner was bombed and sunk at Singapore by Japanese aircraft. She was later salvaged and passed to the Imperial Japanese Navy as Taruyasu Maru.

== 4 February ==
List of shipwrecks: 4 February 1942
Ship	State	Description
HNLMS Deneb	Royal Netherlands Navy	World War II: The Bellatrix-class patrol vessel was sunk in the Doerian Strait off Riau Island by Japanese aircraft. Three of her crew were killed.
Dvinoles	Soviet Union	World War II: Convoy HX 173:The Volgoles-class cargo ship was sunk in a collision in the Atlantic Ocean (47°14′N 50°44′W) with the tanker Havprins (Norway). Her whole crew were rescued by USS Lea (United States Navy).
India Arrow	United States	World War II: The Arrow-class tanker was torpedoed, shelled, and sunk in the Atlantic Ocean (38°48′N 72°34′W) by U-103 (Kriegsmarine) with the loss of 26 of her 38 crew. Survivors, all in one lifeboat, were rescued by the fishing skiff Gitana (United States) on 6 February.
San Gil	Panama	World War II: The cargo ship was torpedoed, shelled, and sunk in the Atlantic Ocean (38°05′N 74°40′W) by U-103 (Kriegsmarine) with the loss of two of the 42 people aboard. Survivors were rescued by USCGC Nike (United States Navy).
Silveray	United Kingdom	World War II: The cargo ship was torpedoed and sunk in the Atlantic Ocean (43°54′N 64°16′W) by U-751 (Kriegsmarine) with the loss of eight of her 58 crew. Survivors were rescued by USCGC Campbell ( United States Coast Guard) and the fishing vessel Lucille M ( Canada).
Togian	Netherlands	World War II: The cargo ship was shelled and damaged in the Timor Sea off Koepang, Netherlands East Indies by I-56 (Imperial Japanese Navy). She was scuttled off Koepang (10°11′46″N 123°31′32″E) on 22 February.
Van Lansberge	Netherlands	World War II: The cargo ship was torpedoed and damaged in the Java Sea south of Makassar, Netherlands East Indies by I-55 (Imperial Japanese Navy). She was scuttled by HNLMS Pieter de Bitter (Royal Netherlands Navy).

== 5 February ==
List of shipwrecks: 5 February 1942
Ship	State	Description
HMS Arbutus	Royal Navy	World War II: Convoy ONS 63: The Flower-class corvette was torpedoed and sunk in the Atlantic Ocean (55°05′N 18°43′W) by U-136 (Kriegsmarine) with the loss of her 87 crew.
China Arrow	United States	World War II: The Arrow-class tanker was torpedoed, shelled, and sunk in the Atlantic Ocean (37°44′N 73°18′W) by U-103 (Kriegsmarine). Her 37 crew were rescued by USCGC Nike ( United States Coast Guard).
Corland	United Kingdom	World War II: The cargo ship was bombed and sunk in the North Sea (53°43′N 0°36′E) by Luftwaffe aircraft. Her 27 crew were rescued.
Empress of Asia	Canada	Empress of Asia World War II: The troopship was bombed and sunk off Singapore by Imperial Japanese Navy aircraft with the loss of sixteen of the 1,820 people aboard. One thousand survivors were rescued by HMAS Yarra, others by HMAS Wollongong, HMAS Bendigo, all (Royal Australian Navy), HMIS Sutlej (Royal Indian Navy), and HMS Danae (Royal Navy).
Halcyon	Panama	World War II: The cargo ship (3,531 GRT) was shelled and heavily damaged sunk in the Atlantic Ocean (34°20′N 59°16′W) by U-109 (Kriegsmarine). Three of her 30 crew were killed. She sank in the early hours of 6th.
Konsul Schulte	Germany	World War II: The cargo ship was torpedoed and sunk in the Barents Sea off Honningsvåg, Norway (70°54′N 26°02′E) by ShCh-421 (Soviet Navy). There were two dead and two wounded.
Montrolite	Canada	World War II: The cargo ship was torpedoed and sunk in the Atlantic Ocean (35°14′N 60°05′W) by U-109 (Kriegsmarine) with the loss of 28 of her 45 crew. Survivors were rescued by Winkleigh (United Kingdom).
Tidore	Netherlands	World War II: The cargo ship was bombed and sunk in the Indian Ocean south of Sumbawa, Netherlands East Indies by Japanese aircraft.

== 6 February ==
List of shipwrecks: 6 February 1942
Ship	State	Description
Major Wheeler	United States	World War II: The cargo ship (3,431 GRT) was torpedoed and sunk in the Atlantic Ocean off Cape Hatteras, North Carolina (34°39′N 73°02′W) by U-107 (Kriegsmarine) with the loss of all 35 crew.
Opawa	United Kingdom	World War II: The cargo ship was torpedoed and sunk in the Atlantic Ocean (38°21′N 61°13′W) by U-106 (Kriegsmarine) with the loss of 56 of her 71 crew. Survivors were rescued by Hercules (Netherlands).
U-82	Kriegsmarine	World War II: The Type VIIC submarine was depth charged and sunk in the Atlantic Ocean north of the Azores, Portugal (44°10′N 23°52′W) by HMS Rochester and HMS Tamarisk (both Royal Navy) with the loss of all 45 crew.

== 7 February ==
List of shipwrecks: 7 February 1942
Ship	State	Description
Aosta	Italy	World War II: The coaster was shelled and sunk in the Mediterranean Sea 45 nautical miles (83 km) south of Pantelleria by HMS Lively and HMS Zulu (both Royal Navy). Nine of her 34 crew were killed. Survivors were rescued by MAS 560, MAS 563, and MAS 577 (all Regia Marina).
Empire Sun	United Kingdom	World War II: The cargo ship was torpedoed and sunk in the Atlantic Ocean south of Halifax, Nova Scotia, Canada (43°55′N 64°22′W) by U-751 (Kriegsmarine) with the loss of eleven of the 65 people aboard.
Gertrude Rask	Denmark	World War II: The auxiliary schooner ran aground at Baccaro Point, Nova Scotia and was wrecked.
Grongo	Regia Marina	World War II: The naval trawler was shelled and sunk in the Mediterranean Sea 45 nautical miles (83 km) south of Pantelleria by HMS Lively and HMS Zulu (both Royal Navy). Ten of her seventeen crew were killed. Survivors were rescued by MAS 577 (Regia Marina).
Maurienne	Canada	The cargo ship caught fire and sank partially capsized at Pier 27/28, Halifax, Nova Scotia. She was refloated June–July, 1942, repaired and returned to service.
Van Cloon	Netherlands	World War II: The cargo ship was torpedoed in the Java Sea south of Bawean, Netherlands East Indies by I-55 (Imperial Japanese Navy). She was beached in a sinking condition on the south shore of Bawean. One hundred and eighty-seven survivors were rescued by USS Isabel (United States Navy).

== 8 February ==
List of shipwrecks: 8 February 1942
Ship	State	Description
Duino	Italy	World War II: The cargo ship was sunk in the Adriatic Sea off Bari, probably by a mine. No search operation was launched before 10 February, and only 44 survivors were found. Depending on sources 173 (37 crew, nine gunners and 127 passengers) or 165 lives (37 crew, ten gunners and 118 passengers) were lost in the sinking or at sea in the following days.
Hosang	United Kingdom	The cargo ship ran aground whilst on a voyage from Singapore to Palembang, Netherlands East Indies. She was abandoned on 13 February. She was later salvaged by the Japanese, repaired and entered service as Gyozan Maru.
Ocean Venture	United Kingdom	World War II: The cargo ship was torpedoed and sunk in the Atlantic Ocean (37°05′N 74°46′W) by U-108 (Kriegsmarine) with the loss of 31 of her 43 crew. Survivors were rescued by USS Roe (United States Navy).
West Jaffrey	United States	The Design 1013 cargo ship ran aground on Harriet Ledge, Halfbald Island, or Pease Island (43°36′N 66°30′W) and was a total loss.

== 9 February ==
List of shipwrecks: 9 February 1942
Ship	State	Description
Alysse	Free French Naval Forces	World War II: Convoy ONS 61: The Flower-class corvette was torpedoed and damaged in the Atlantic Ocean 420 nautical miles (780 km) east of Cape Race, Dominion of Newfoundland (46°22′N 43°42′W) by U-654 (Kriegsmarine) with the loss of 36 of her 70 crew. Survivors were rescued by HMCS Hepatica and HMCS Moose Jaw (both Royal Canadian Navy). Alysse foundered on 10 February at 46°34′N 44°10′W.
Anba Maru	Japan	An explosion was heard south east of the Taichow Islands, China. Debris was discovered floating at 27°55′N 121°48′E on 10 February by Shinko Maru No. 1 Go (Imperial Japanese Navy).
Anderson	Norway	World War II: Convoy HX 174: The cargo ship ran aground at Eastern Head, St. Shott's, Dominion of Newfoundland with the loss of eight of her 25 crew. Survivors were rescued by USS Brant (United States Navy). She was a total loss.
Empire Fusilier	United Kingdom	World War II: The cargo ship was torpedoed and sunk in the Atlantic Ocean south east of St John's, Dominion of Newfoundland by U-85 (Kriegsmarine) with the loss of nine of her 41 crew. Survivors were rescued by HMCS Barrie (Royal Canadian Navy).
Frodi	Iceland	The fishing trawler ran aground and sank at Seafellsnes. She was being used as a coaster at the time.
HMS Herald	United Kingdom	World War II: The survey ship was damaged by aircraft and scuttled at Selatar, Singapore. She was later salvaged by the Japanese and entered Imperial Japanese Navy service as the escort ship Heiyo.
Kurama Maru	Imperial Japanese Army	World War II: The Kurama Maru-class auxiliary transport ship was torpedoed and sunk northeast of Formosa by USS Trout (United States Navy) (28°25′N 122°03′E). Fifty-eight of her passengers and crew were killed.
USS Lafayette	United States Navy	USS Lafayette The ocean liner caught fire, capsized and sank at New York whilst under conversion to a troopship. A member of the fire watch died and 285 people were treated for various injuries, burns, smoke inhalation, and exposure. She was salvaged in 1946 and scrapped.
Natsushio	Imperial Japanese Navy	World War II: Macassar invasion convoy escort force: The Kagerō-class destroyer sank due to damage sustained the previous day when she was torpedoed in the Makassar Strait 22 miles (35 km) south of Makassar, Netherlands East Indies (05°10′S 119°24′E) by USS S-37 (United States Navy) with the loss of eight killed and two wounded. Survivors were rescued by Kuroshio and Oyashio (both Imperial Japanese Navy).
Salpi	Italy	World War II: The cargo ship struck a mine (probably laid in October 1941 by HMS Rorqual (Royal Navy)) and sank in the Mediterranean Sea two nautical miles (3.7 km; 2.3 mi) east of Cape Ferrato. Four of her 33 crew were killed.
HMS Tanjong Katong	Royal Navy	World War II: The auxiliary patrol vessel was bombed and sunk in the Sungei Kranji River, Singapore by Japanese aircraft.
Tolosa	Norway	World War II: The cargo ship was torpedoed and sunk in the Atlantic Ocean off the coast of the Carolinas, United States (34°40′N 73°50′W) by U-108 (Kriegsmarine) with the loss of all 22 crew.

== 10 February ==
List of shipwrecks: 10 February 1942
Ship	State	Description
Chuwa Maru	Imperial Japanese Navy	World War II: The Chowa Maru-class auxiliary transport ship was torpedoed and sunk in the East China Sea east of Kirun, China (25°23′N 122°42′E) by USS Trout (United States Navy). There were no fatalities.
Wolfram	Germany	World War II: The cargo ship was torpedoed and sunk in the North Sea north of Vlieland, Friesland, Netherlands by British aircraft.

== 11 February ==
For destruction of the Italian cargo ship Napoli, see the entry for 3 February.

List of shipwrecks: 11 February 1942
Ship	State	Description
Blink	Norway	World War II: The cargo ship was torpedoed and sunk in the Atlantic Ocean (35°00′N 72°27′W) by U-108 (Kriegsmarine) with the loss of 24 of her 30 crew. Survivors were rescued by Monroe (United States).
Doob	Soviet Navy	World War II: The auxiliary minelayer struck a mine and sank in the Black Sea off Sevastopol. Six of her crew were killed.
Heina	Norway	World War II: Convoy SC 67: The cargo ship was torpedoed and sunk in the Atlantic Ocean (56°10′N 21°07′W) by U-136 (Kriegsmarine). Her 30 crew were rescued by HMCS Dauphin (Royal Canadian Navy).
HMS Lipis	Royal Navy	World War II: The armed patrol vessel sank off Singapore with the loss of a crew member, or was attacked by Japanese aircraft and abandoned on fire with steering gear failure off Sultan Shoal, near Singapore, eventually drifting ashore. The wreck was seized by the Imperial Japanese Navy, repaired and returned to service as Risui Maru.
M 1208 Gauleiter Forster	Kriegsmarine	World War II: The auxiliary minesweeper struck a mine and sank in the English Channel off Barfleur, Manche, France.
R-42	Kriegsmarine	The Type R-41 minesweeper struck a wreck and sank in the English Channel.
Rhoda, and Simit III	United Kingdom	World War II: The motor launches were scuttled at Singapore.
USS Shark	United States Navy	World War II: The Porpoise-class submarine was sunk in the Pacific Ocean by the Japanese destroyer Yamakaze (Imperial Japanese Navy) with the loss of all 54 crew.
HMCS Spikenard	Royal Canadian Navy	World War II: Convoy SC 67: The Flower-class corvette was torpedoed and sunk in the Atlantic Ocean (56°10′N 21°07′W) by U-136 (Kriegsmarine) with the loss of 57 of her 65 crew. Survivors were rescued by HMS Gentian (Royal Navy).
Victolite	Canada	World War II: The tanker was torpedoed and sunk in the Atlantic Ocean 260 nautical miles (480 km; 300 mi) north north west of Bermuda (36°12′N 67°14′W) by U-564 (Kriegsmarine) with the loss of all 47 crew.

== 12 February ==
List of shipwrecks: 12 February 1942
Ship	State	Description
Dixie Sword	United States	The cargo ship foundered during a storm without loss of life in 50 feet (15 m) of water on Pollock Rip Shoal off Monomoy Island in Nantucket Sound off the coast of Massachusetts at either (41°35′N 69°59′W) or (41°32′58″N 069°58′50″W).
Giuseppina	Italy	World War II: The auxiliary barquentine was sunk in the Mediterranean Sea west of Kefalonia, Greece by ORP Sokół (Polish Navy). Her crew were rescued.
V 1302 John Mahn	Kriegsmarine	World War II: The Vorpostenboot was bombed and sunk in the English Channel northwest of Zeebrugge, West Flanders, Belgium by Royal Air Force aircraft. Twelve of her 47 crew were killed.
Lucania	Italy	World War II: The tanker was torpedoed and sunk in the Mediterranean Sea (39°20′N 17°25′E) by HMS Una (Royal Navy). Her crew survived.
HMS Maori	Royal Navy	The wreck of Maori World War II: The Tribal-class destroyer was bombed and sunk at Grand Harbour, Malta by Luftwaffe aircraft with the loss of a crew member. She was later raised, and was scuttled off Malta on 15 July 1945.
Mindanao	United States	World War II: The tanker was bombed and sunk off White Beach, northwestern Mindoro, Philippines by Japanese aircraft. She was subsequently salvaged and taken in to Japanese service as Palembang Maru.
Skanderbeg	Italy	World War II: The cargo ship was captured by Yugoslav Partizans and scuttled in Lake Skadar.
Wan Yuan	United Kingdom	World War II: Battle of Singapore:The requisitioned passenger ship was scuttled at Singapore after her stern was demolished and her main engines put out of action by nearby demolition explosions the day before. She was later seized by the Japanese in Keppel Harbour.

== 13 February ==
List of shipwrecks: 13 February 1942
Ship	State	Description
Brunei	United Kingdom	World War II: The coaster was scuttled at Singapore.
HMT Changteh	Royal Navy	World War II: The auxiliary minesweeper was bombed and sunk in the Rhio Strait by Japanese aircraft with the loss of 68 of the 118 people aboard.
Derrymore	United Kingdom	World War II: The former passenger ship, armed and requisitioned in Australia carrying ammunition and many British airmen, was torpedoed and sunk some 50 nautical miles (93 km) north north west of Batavia, Netherlands East Indies (5°18′S 106°20′E by I-55 (Imperial Japanese Navy) with the loss of nine of the 245 people aboard. Survivors (one being future Prime Minister of Australia John Gorton) were rescued by HMAS Ballarat (Royal Australian Navy) and HNLMS Cheribon (Royal Netherlands Navy).
HMS Giang Bee	Royal Navy	World War II: Battle of Singapore: The patrol vessel was bombed and damaged off Berhala Island, Netherlands East Indies by Japanese aircraft. Later, in the evening, she was shelled and sunk by Asagiri or Fubuki (both Imperial Japanese Navy) in the Banka Strait with the loss of 223 of at least 293 people aboard. Fifteen survivors were rescued by HMS Tapah (Royal Navy). One lifeboat with 56 survivors sailed to Banka Island, another lifeboat with 42 survivors sailed to Sumatra, Netherlands East Indies.
Greedir	Iceland	World War II: The fishing trawler was sunk off Hvalfjordur in a collision with USS Ericsson (United States Navy).
HMS Jarak	Royal Navy	World War II: The auxiliary patrol vessel was shelled and damaged in the Rhio Strait by Japanese forces. She was abandoned, but was later reboarded. She developed engine defects on 18 February and was scuttled south of Singkap Island, Netherlands East Indies.
Kuala	Royal Navy	World War II: The auxiliary patrol ship was bombed and sunk in the Bangka Strait off Pom Pong Island by Japanese aircraft. One hundred and fifty survivors were rescued by HMT Tandjong Pinang (Royal Navy).
HMS MMS-180	Royal Navy	The MMS-1-class minesweeper was sunk in a collision off the mouth of the River Tyne.
Manvantara	Netherlands	World War II: The tanker was bombed and sunk in the Java Sea by Japanese aircraft whilst on a voyage from Palembang to Batavia, Netherlands East Indies with the loss of four of the 51 people aboard. Survivors were rescued by HMS Bulan (Royal Navy) and HMAS Toowoomba (Royal Australian Navy).
Merula	Netherlands	World War II: The tanker was bombed and sunk in the Banka Strait by Japanese aircraft with the loss of 42 of the 50 people aboard. Survivors were rescued by Herborg (Norway), or by HMS Bulan (Royal Navy) and HMAS Toowoomba (Royal Australian Navy).
HMS Panglima	Royal Navy	World War II: The patrol boat was scuttled in the Bangka Strait.
Redang	United Kingdom	World War II: The passenger ship was shelled and sunk 50 nautical miles (93 km) east south east of Berhala Island by Japaneses naval vessels with the loss of 58-80 of the 70-110 people aboard. Survivors made it to Sumatra in a lifeboat and were rescued by HMS Tapah (Royal Navy).
HMS Scorpion	Royal Navy	World War II: The Scorpion-class gunboat was shelled and sunk north of the Banka Strait by Yura, Asagiri and all Fubuki (both Imperial Japanese Navy) with the loss of 115 of her 145 crew.
HMS Siang Wo	Royal Navy	World War II: The anti-submarine vessel was bombed and damaged by Japanese aircraft. She was beached on Bangka Island with the loss of two lives. Declared a total loss.
Subadar	United Kingdom	World War II: The cargo shi was bombed and sunk in the Bangka Strait by Japanese aircraft with the loss of five of her 86 crew.
Sui Wo	Royal Navy	World War II: The hospital ship was bombed and sunk off Singapore by Japanese aircraft.
HMS Tempest	Royal Navy	World War II: The T-class submarine was depth charged and sunk in the Gulf of Taranto by Circe (Regia Marina). Thirty-nine of her crew were killed or died of wounds, and the 23 survivors were taken as prisoners of war.
HMS Trang	Royal Navy	World War II: Battle of Singapore:The auxiliary patrol vessel, a naval whaler, ran aground on Peak Island, Singapore. She was refloated and scuttled by burning in Cooper's Channel. Her 26 crew were taken as prisoners of war.

== 14 February ==
List of shipwrecks: 14 February 1942
Ship	State	Description
Ariosto	Italy	World War II: The troopship was sunk by torpedo in the Mediterranean Sea 12 nautical miles (22 km) east of Cape Africa by HMS P38 (Royal Navy), killing 160 of the 410 people aboard, including 138 Allied prisoners of war. Survivors were rescued by Premuda and Polluce (both Regia Marina).
Clan Chattan	United Kingdom	World War II: Convoy MW 9A: The troopship was bombed and sunk in the Mediterranean Sea (35°01′N 20°11′E) by Luftwaffe aircraft. All 358 people aboard were rescued.
HMS Dragonfly	Royal Navy	World War II: The Dragonfly-class gunboat was bombed and damaged off Rusuk Buaja Island, Singapore by Japanese aircraft with the loss of 32 crew and an unknown number of passengers. She was abandoned and later sank. Two of her crew were taken as prisoners of war.
Empire Spring	United Kingdom	World War II: The CAM ship was torpedoed and sunk in the Atlantic Ocean (approximately 42°N 55°W) by U-576 (Kriegsmarine) with the loss of all 55 crew.
HMS Grasshopper	Royal Navy	World War II: The Dragonfly-class gunboat was bombed and sunk off Rusuk Island by Japanese aircraft with the loss of 165 crew. Some of the survivors were rescued by HMS Stronghold (Royal Navy). A crew member was taken as a prisoner of war.
Gwydir	Australia	The coaster drifted onto a reef on the north side of Norah Head, New South Wales after becoming disabled north of Nora Head in a collision with Neo Hebredais (Free France).
Hosang	United Kingdom	World War II: The cargo ship was bombed and damaged by Japanese aircraft. She ran aground in the Moesi River and was abandoned, but was reportedly captured off Muntok two days later and put in Japanese service as Guyozan Maru.
HMS Hua Tong	Royal Navy	World War II: The auxiliary patrol vessel was bombed and sunk at Palembang, Netherlands East Indies by Japanese aircraft. Her crew survived.
Inabasan Maru	Japan	World War II: The cargo ship was bombed and sunk in the South China Sea north of Sumatra, Netherlands East Indies (1°25′S 105°00′E) by Bristol Blenheim aircraft of 211 Squadron, Royal Air Force. Four of her crew were killed.
Kamuning	Straits Settlements	World War II: The cargo ship was shelled and sunk in the Indian Ocean (8°35′N 81°44′E) by I-66 (Imperial Japanese Navy) with the loss of three of her 66 crew. Survivors were rescued by HMS Balta (Royal Navy).
HMS Kuala	Royal Navy	World War II: The auxiliary patrol vessel was bombed and sunk by Japanese aircraft at Pompong Island south of the southern exit of Rhio Strait, about 45 nautical miles (83 km) south east of Singapore. An unknown number of people were killed in the sinking or when the aircraft bombed survivors in the water. Of 500 evacuees and unknown number of crew originally on board, plus survivors of HMS Tien Kwang (Royal Navy), over 200 were rescued by Tandong Pinang (Netherlands), 70 by HMAS Krait (Royal Australian Navy), remaining survivors picked up by four Chinese Junks.
HMS Kung Wo	Royal Navy	World War II: The minelayer was bombed and damaged 6 nautical miles (11 km) off Pompong Island and was abandoned with the loss of a crew member. She later sank. Of the survivors, one crew member was taken as a prisoner of war.
HMS Li Wo	Royal Navy	World War II: The auxiliary patrol vessel attacked a Japanese convoy in the Java Sea off Malaya and was sunk by Yura (Imperial Japanese Navy). Approximately 75-77 people were killed, 7 or 11 survived. Her captain, Thomas Wilkinson was awarded a posthumous Victoria Cross for this action.
HMML 310	Royal Navy	World War II: The Fairmile B motor launch was bombed and damaged by Japanese aircraft. She was scuttled at Tjebia Island, Netherlands East Indies. Three crew and two Javanese set out in a small boat and were rscued by a Royal Australian Navy corvette. Of the 41 others Rear Admiral E J Spooner, Vice Air Marshall C W H Pulford, Cdr P L Frampton and twelve ratings died before the rest were captured on 19 May. HMML 310 was raised, repaired and put into Imperial Japanese Navy service in 1943 as Kusentai 102 Go.
HMML 311	Royal Navy	World War II: The Fairmile B motor launch was shelled and sunk by Japanese warships in the Banka Strait.
HMS Pengawal	Royal Navy	World War II: The tug was bombed and sunk in the Durian Strait near Singapore by Japanese aircraft.
President Taylor	United States	World War II: The American President Lines cargo liner (10,496 GRT, 1920) requisitioned for war service, allocated by War Shipping Administration (WSA) to the United States Army grounded while landing two companies of infantry and two battalions of coastal artillery, about 1,100 men, for the Canton (Kanton) Island garrison (2°30′S 17°05′W). She was attacked and destroyed by Japanese aircraft on 1 March.
Rowallan Castle	United Kingdom	World War II: The cargo liner (7,798 GRT, 1939) was bombed and disabled in the Mediterranean Sea (34°54′N 19°40′E) by Luftwaffe aircraft. The presence at sea of the battleship Duilio (Regia Marina) forced the British escort to scuttle the steamer. All 100 people aboard were rescued.
HMS St Breock	Royal Navy	World War II: The Saint-class tug was bombed and sunk by Japanese aircraft off Sumatra.
HMS St Just	Royal Navy	World War II: The Saint-class tug was scuttled off Palembang, or (420 GRT 1919) sunk by aircraft in the Durian Straits, Singapore.
HMS Shu Kwang	Royal Navy	World War II: The auxiliary patrol vessel, a River-class tanker, was bombed and sunk in the Java Sea (0°35′N 104°00′E) by Japanese aircraft with the loss of 20 of her crew. Around 273 people were rescued. She was salvaged by the Japanese and put in service as Fukuan Maru.
HMS Tien Kwang	Royal Navy	World War II: The auxiliary anti-submarine vessel was bombed and damaged off Pompong Island. She was scuttled the next day. Of over 300 people aboard, only four survived to be taken as prisoners of war.
Vyner Brooke	Sarawak	World War II: Bangka Island massacre: The royal yacht was bombed and sunk in the Bangka Strait 15 nautical miles (28 km) north of Muntok, Netherlands East Indies by Japanese aircraft with the loss of 125 of the 228 people aboard. Two of her crew were taken as prisoners of war.

== 15 February ==
List of shipwrecks: 15 February 1942
Ship	State	Description
Aquarius	Royal Air Force	World War II: The auxiliary seaplane tender was sunk by Japanese ships or aircraft near Bangka Island, Netherlands East Indies. Of the crew of 32 and 60–70 passengers, only 3 were rescued, but they died soon afterwards.
Biela	United Kingdom	World War II: The cargo ship was torpedoed and sunk in the Atlantic Ocean (42°55′N 45°40′W) by U-98 (Kriegsmarine). with the loss of all 50 crew.
Birk	Germany	World War II: The cargo ship struck a mine and sank at Kirkenes, Norway with the loss of 26 of her crew.
Buarque	Brazil	World War II: The Design 1022 cargo ship was torpedoed and sunk in the Atlantic Ocean between Cape May, New Jersey and Cape Hatteras, North Carolina, United States (36°35′N 75°20′W) by U-432 (Kriegsmarine) with the loss of one of the 85 people aboard. Survivors were rescued by USCGC Calypso ( United States Coast Guard), USS Eagle 19 and USS Jacob Jones (both United States Navy).
HMS Chuting	Royal Navy	World War II: Battle of Singapore:The minesweeping tug was sunk by Japanese aircraft at Singapore.
Hong Chuan	United Kingdom	The steamboat was set on fire by burning buildings at Jambi, Netherlands East Indies and sank.
Hung Gao	United Kingdom	World War II: The ship was sunk by enemy action.
HNLMS Iris	Royal Netherlands Navy	World War II: The tanker was scuttled at Palembang, Netherlands East Indies. She was raised on 14 October 1942, repaired, and put into Imperial Japanese Army service as Kikusui Maru.
HMT Jerantut	Royal Navy	World War II: The auxiliary patrol boat was scuttled at Palembang.
Johanne Justesen	United Kingdom	World War II: The cargo ship was torpedoed and sunk in the Indian Ocean (9°04′N 75°58′E) by I-65 (Imperial Japanese Navy) with the loss of one of her 59 crew.
HMT Klias	Royal Navy	World War II: The auxiliary patrol boat/naval trawler was scuttled in the Indragiri River near Palembang.
Laburnum	Straits Settlements	World War II: Battle of Singapore: The Acacia-class sloop-of-war, serving as a drill and training ship, was scuttled at Singapore to prevent her capture by Japanese forces.
HMS ML 169	Royal Navy	The Fairmile B motor launch caught fire at Gibraltar and was destroyed.
HMS ML 433	Royal Navy	World War II: The Fairmile B motor launch was shelled and sunk by Imperial Japanese Navy warships in the Bangka Strait. A passenger was killed.
Makasser	Netherlands	World War II: The cargo ship was scuttled in the Bangka Strait to prevent capture when approached by Yura and Asagiri both (Imperial Japanese Navy).
HMT Mata Hari	Royal Navy	World War II: The anti-submarine vessel was shelled and sunk at Bangka Island by Japanese artillery. Survivors were taken as prisoners of war.
Meropi	Greece	World War II: Convoy ON 60: The cargo ship straggled behind the convoy. She was torpedoed and sunk in the Atlantic Ocean 35 nautical miles (65 km) east of the Sambro Island Lighthouse, Nova Scotia, Canada (44°14′N 62°41′W) by U-566 (Kriegsmarine) with the loss of 26 of the 40 people aboard. Survivors were rescued by HMCS Sherbrooke (Royal Canadian Navy).
Mersing	United Kingdom	World War II: The steamboat was sunk at Singapore by enemy action.
Oscar II	United Kingdom	World War II: Battle of Singapore:The coal hulk was scuttled off Singapore.
HNLMS Pro Patria	Royal Netherlands Navy	World War II: The Pro Patria-class minelayer was scuttled at the mouth of the Musi River near Palembang.
HNLMS Semiramis	Royal Netherlands Navy	World War II: The tanker was scuttled at Palembang. She was raised, repaired, put into Japanese service in late 1942 as Kyoko Maru.
HMY Silvia	Royal Navy	World War II: The yacht was sunk at Singapore by enemy action.
Siushan	United Kingdom	World War II: The coaster was sunk at Singapore by enemy aircraft.
Sungei Pinang	United Kingdom	World War II: The coaster was sunk by enemy action.
HNLMS Van Ghent	Royal Netherlands Navy	World War II: The Admiralen-class destroyer ran aground on Bamidjo Reef in the Stolze Strait between Bangka Island and Billiton Island, Netherlands East Indies (03°02′S 107°21′E). Her crew were rescued by HNLMS Banckert (Royal Netherlands Navy) and HNLMS Van Ghent was scuttled.
HMS Yin Ping	Royal Navy	World War II: The tug was shelled and sunk in the Bangka Strait off Muntok, Netherlands East Indies by Imperial Japanese Navy vessels with the loss of 50 of the 75 people aboard.

== 16 February ==
List of shipwrecks: 16 February 1942
Ship	State	Description
Bagan	United Kingdom	World War II: The ferry was scuttled at Palembang, Netherlands East Indies.
E. H. Blum	United States	World War II: The tanker struck a mine, broke in two, and sank in the Atlantic Ocean off Cape Henry, Virginia. Her crew were rescued by USCGC Woodbury. Both parts were salvaged and she was repaired and returned to service.
HMS Elizabeth	Royal Navy	World War II: The auxiliary patrol vessel was shelled and sunk in the Bangka Strait with the loss of 24 of the 26 people aboard.
HMS Fanling	Royal Navy	World War II: The auxiliary patrol/customs launch was shelled and sunk in the Bangka Strait.
HMT Fuh Wo	Royal Navy	World War II: After being damaged in an air attack the auxiliary minesweeper was beached on Bangka Island, Netherlands East Indies and was destroyed by her crew.
HMML 1062	Royal Navy	World War II: The Harbour Defence Motor Launch was shelled and sunk by Imperial Japanese Navy warships in the Bangka Strait. Four of her crew were killed. She was raised, repaired and put into Japanese service as Suikei 11.
Le Baleina	Italy	World War II: The fishing trawler was sunkin the Bay of Biscay by Royal Air Force aircraft .
Monagas	Venezuela	World War II: The tanker was torpedoed and sunk in the Gulf of Venezuela by U-502 (Kriegsmarine) with the loss of five of her 31 crew.
Oranjestad	United Kingdom	World War II: The tanker was torpedoed and sunk in the Caribbean Sea off San Nicolaas, Netherlands Antilles (12°25′N 69°55′W) by U-156 (Kriegsmarine) with the loss of fifteen of her 25 crew.
HMS Pulo Soegi	Royal Navy	World War II: The small coaster was shelled and sunk in the Bangka Strait by a Japanese cruiser.
Rafaela	Netherlands	World War II: The tanker was torpedoed and damaged in the Caribbean Sea 1 nautical mile (1.9 km) off Willemstad, Netherlands Antilles by U-67 (Kriegsmarine). She was taken in tow by the tugs Mico and Parmo (both Netherlands) but broke in two and sank in Sint Anna Bay. She was raised, repaired and returned to service after about four months.
Ramapo	Panama	World War II: The tanker was torpedoed and sunk in the Caribbean Sea 1 nautical mile (1.9 km) off Curaçao, Netherlands Antilles (35°10′N 65°50′W) by U-108 (Kriegsmarine) with the loss of all 40 crew.
Remi	Germany	The coaster suffered an engine failure and was wrecked near the Norderney Lighthouse.
Rene Cameleyre	Vichy France	World War II: The fishing trawler was sunk in the Bay of Biscay by Royal Air Force aircraft.
San Nicolas	United Kingdom	World War II: The tanker was torpedoed and sunk in the Gulf of Venezuela 25 nautical miles (46 km) off Point Macolla by U-502 (Kriegsmarine) with the loss of seven of her 26 crew.
Tia Juana	United Kingdom	World War II: The tanker was torpedoed and sunk in the Gulf of Venezuela 25 nautical miles (46 km) off Point Macolla by U-502 (Kriegsmarine) with the loss of seventeen of her 26 crew.
Vincent Cameleyre	Vichy France	World War II: The fishing trawler was sunk in the Bay of Biscay by Royal Air Force aircraft.

== 17 February ==
List of shipwrecks: 17 February 1942
Ship	State	Description
USS Detector	United States Navy	The Accentor-class minesweeper (195/221 t, 1941) was sunk in collision with the tanker Oswego (United States) 300 yards (270 m) east north east of the Finn's Ledge Buoy, off Boston, Massachusetts. USS Detector was later raised, repaired, and returned to service.
Empire Comet	United Kingdom	World War II: Convoy HX 174: The cargo ship straggled behind the convoy on the 9th. She was torpedoed and sunk in the Atlantic Ocean (58°15′N 17°10′W) by U-136 (Kriegsmarine) with the loss of all 46 crew.
Hoyo Maru	Japan	World War II: Operation Hailstone: The tanker was sunk in the Truk Atoll (7°23′N 151°50′E) by United States Navy carrier-based aircraft.
NS 21 Eber	Kriegsmarine	World War II: The naval trawler/guard boat was torpedoed and sunk in the North Sea off Skudeneshavn, Norway (59°07′N 5°17′E) by Allied aircraft.
USS Paramount	United States Navy	The Accentor-class minesweeper ran aground off Cape Hatteras, North Carolina and was abandoned. She was later salvaged and returned to service.
Rudnitchar	Bulgaria	The cargo ship was holed by ice in the Bosporus and was beached at Poiras Point, Turkey. She was declared a total loss.
Shinyo Maru No. 5	Imperial Japanese Navy	World War II: The auxiliary gunboat was torpedoed and sunk off Kyūshū by USS Triton (United States Navy).
Sloet van der Beele	Netherlands	World War II: The miscellaneous auxiliary transport ship, under escort by HNLMS Van Nes and bringing a Netherlands East Indies battalion from Billiton Island to Java, was torpedoed and sunk south of Bangka Island, Netherlands East Indies, by Japanese aircraft with the loss of most of the possibly over 1,000 people aboard (38 were rescued by a Dutch minesweeper and 234 by the Dutch Naval Air Service).
Spyros	Greece	The cargo ship struck a rock, broke in two and sank near Lawrencetown, Nova Scotia, Canada.
HMT Tandjong Pinang	Royal Navy	World War II: The auxiliary patrol vessel was shelled and sunk 30 nautical miles (56 km) south of Pulo Ubar by Imperial Japanese Navy vessels. Of 150 passengers and seventeen crew there were only three survivors; two of them were from Kuala (United Kingdom).
Tatung	United Kingdom	World War II: The cargo liner was scuttled south of Singapore to prevent capture. She was raised, repaired and put into Japanese service as Taito Maru.
Tevere	Regia Marina	World War II: The hospital ship struck a mine off Tripoli, Libya and was severely damaged. She put in to Tripoli.
HNLMS Van Nes	Royal Netherlands Navy	World War II: The Admiralen-class destroyer was bombed and sunk south of Bangka Island by Japanese aircraft while escorting the transport Sloet van der Beele with the loss of 68 lives.

== 18 February ==
List of shipwrecks: 18 February 1942
Ship	State	Description
HMT Botanic	Royal Navy	World War II: The 140.3-foot (42.8 m), 348-ton minesweeping naval trawler was bombed and damaged in the North Sea off Buoy 62D 16 miles (26 km) off Spurn Point, sank later under tow, with the loss of one of her crew.
HMS Jarak	Royal Navy	World War II: The auxiliary patrol boat was scuttled south of Singkap Island, Netherlands East Indies after suffering engine failure. She had earlier been shelled and damaged in the Rhio Strait by Imperial Japanese Navy warships and abandoned, but later reboarded.
HNLMS K VII	Royal Netherlands Navy	World War II: Battle of Java: The K V-class submarine was bombed and sunk while lying submerged on the bottom of Surabaya Harbour, Netherlands East Indies by Japanese aircraft. All thirteen crew were lost.
HMT Malacca	Royal Navy	World War II: The auxiliary patrol vessel was scuttled in the Tjemake River, Sumatra, Netherlands East Indies.
Middleton	United Kingdom	The cargo ship collided with Tungsha (United Kingdom) and sank in the Atlantic Ocean (55°07′30″N 5°27′00″W).
Olinda	Brazil	World War II: The cargo ship was torpedoed and sunk in the Atlantic Ocean off the coast of Virginia, United States (37°30′N 75°00′W) by U-432 (Kriegsmarine). Her 47 crew were rescued by USS Dallas (United States Navy) and landed at Norfolk, Virginia.
USS Pollux	United States Navy	World War II: The Castor-class general stores issue ship ran aground at Lawn Point, Placentia Bay, Dominion of Newfoundland and was wrecked with the loss of 93 of her 199 crew.
HNLMS Soerabaja	Royal Netherlands Navy	World War II: Battle of Java: The gunnery training ship was bombed and sunk at Surabaya by Japanese aircraft.
Somme	United Kingdom	World War II: The cargo ship was torpedoed and sunk in the Atlantic Ocean (approximately 40°N 55°W) by U-108 (Kriegsmarine) with the loss of all 59 crew.
Surcouf	Free French Naval Forces	The submarine collided with Thompson Lykes (United States) and sank in the Caribbean Sea 70 nautical miles (130 km) north of Cristóbal, Panama with the loss of all 118 crew.
USS Truxtun	United States Navy	The Clemson-class destroyer ran aground in Placentia Bay at Ferryland Point and was wrecked with the loss of 110 of her 122 crew.
HMT Warland	Royal Navy	World War II: The 117.2-foot (35.7 m), 214-ton anti-submarine naval trawler was bombed and sunk in the North Sea off Spurn Point, Yorkshire.
USS Wilkes	United States Navy	The Gleaves-class destroyer ran aground in Placentia Bay. She was refloated.

== 19 February ==
List of shipwrecks: 19 February 1942
Ship	State	Description
Barossa	Australia	World War II: Bombing of Darwin: The cargo ship was bombed by Imperial Japanese Navy aircraft at Darwin, Northern Territory. She was beached and burned out. She was later refloated and salvaged.
British Consul	United Kingdom	World War II: The tanker was torpedoed and sunk at Port of Spain, Trinidad by U-161 (Kriegsmarine) with the loss of two of her 39 crew. She was later salvaged and repaired.
British Motorist	United Kingdom	World War II: Bombing of Darwin: The tanker was bombed and sunk by Imperial Japanese Navy aircraft at Darwin with the loss of four of her 61 crew.
HMAS Coongoola	Royal Australian Navy	World War II: Bombing of Darwin: The patrol boat was bombed and sunk by Imperial Japanese Navy aircraft at Darwin.
Don Isidro	Philippines	Don Isidro World War II: Bombing of Darwin: The cargo ship, operating as a United States Army transport, was bombed and damaged in the Pacific Ocean north west of Bathurst Island, Northern Territory (approximately 11°S 130°E) by Japanese aircraft and was beached with the loss of eleven of her 84 crew. Survivors were rescued by HMAS Warrnambool (Royal Australian Navy). Don Isidro was declared a total loss.
Empire Seal	United Kingdom	World War II: The cargo ship was torpedoed and sunk in the Atlantic Ocean (43°14′N 64°45′W) by U-96 (Kriegsmarine) with the loss of one of her 56 crew. Survivors were rescued by Empire Flame (United Kingdom).
Florence D.	United States	World War II: Bombing of Darwin: The cargo ship was bombed and sunk in the Pacific Ocean 60 nautical miles (110 km) north west of Bathurst Island (10°56′S 130°07′E) by Japanese aircraft with the loss of three of her 37 crew. Survivors were rescued by HMAS Warrnambool (Royal Australian Navy) or walked to a mission and were transported to Darwin by the lugger St Francis (Australia) .
Kelat	Royal Australian Navy	Kelat World War II: Bombing of Darwin: The coal hulk was bombed and sunk at Darwin by Imperial Japanese Navy aircraft.
HMHS Manunda	Royal Navy	World War II: Bombing of Darwin: The hospital ship was bombed and damaged at Darwin by Imperial Japanese Navy aircraft. Several people were killed.
Mauna Loa	United States	Mauna Loa World War II: Bombing of Darwin: The Design 1013 ship was bombed and sunk at Darwin by Imperial Japanese Navy aircraft. All 44 people aboard survived.
HMAS Mavie	Royal Australian Navy	World War II: Bombing of Darwin: The patrol boat was bombed and sunk at Darwin by Imperial Japanese Navy aircraft. Her four crew survived.
USAT Meigs	United States Army	World War II: Bombing of Darwin: The Design 1133 ship was bombed and sunk at Darwin by Imperial Japanese Navy aircraft with the loss of two of her 62 crew.
Miraflores	United Kingdom	World War II: The cargo ship was torpedoed and sunk in the Atlantic Ocean off southern New Jersey, United States (at 39°21′N 73°18′W), by U-432 (Kriegsmarine) with the loss of all 34 crew.
Mokihana	United States	World War II: The Design 1033 ship was torpedoed and sunk at Port of Spain, Trinidad by U-161 (Kriegsmarine). Her 45 crew survived. She was salvaged, repaired and returned to service in September 1942.
Neptuna	United Kingdom	Neptuna exploding. World War II: Bombing of Darwin: The cargo ship was bombed and sunk at Darwin by Imperial Japanese Navy aircraft when her cargo of 100 depth charges exploded with the loss of 45 of her crew.
Neptune	United States	World War II: The harbor vessel was shelled and sunk in Manila Bay off Fort Frank, Philippines by Japanese artillery.
Pan Massachusetts	United States	World War II: The tanker was torpedoed and sunk in the Atlantic Ocean (28°27′N 80°08′W) by U-128 (Kriegsmarine) with the loss of 22 of her 40 crew. Survivors were rescued by Elizabeth Massey (United Kingdom) with the aid of USCGC Forward ( United States Coast Guard).
USS Peary	United States Navy	USS Peary World War II: Bombing of Darwin: The Clemson-class destroyer was bombed and sunk at Darwin by Imperial Japanese Navy aircraft with the loss of 80 of her 101 crew.
HNLMS Piet Hein	Royal Netherlands Navy	World War II: Battle of Badung Strait: The Admiralen-class destroyer was torpedoed and sunk by Asashio (Imperial Japanese Navy) with the loss of all but 33 of her crew.
Portmar	United States	Portmar World War II: Bombing of Darwin: The cargo ship, chartered by the United States Army, was bombed and damaged at Darwin by Imperial Japanese Navy aircraft. She was beached to prevent her sinking. Two troops and two crewmen were killed. She was refloated, repaired and returned to service.
Zealandia	Australia	World War II: Bombing of Darwin: The cargo liner was bombed and sunk at Darwin by Imperial Japanese Navy aircraft with the loss of two of her 142 crew.

== 20 February ==
List of shipwrecks: 20 February 1942
Ship	State	Description
Berouw	Netherlands	The cargo ship ran aground and was wrecked near Semarang, Netherlands East Indies.
Bhima	United Kingdom	World War II: The cargo ship was torpedoed and sunk in the Pacific Ocean (7°47′N 73°31′E) by I-65 (Imperial Japanese Navy). All 70 people aboard were rescued.
Delplata	United States	World War II: The cargo ship was torpedoed and damaged in the Atlantic Ocean (14°55′N 62°10′W) by U-156 (Kriegsmarine). Her 52 crew were rescued by USS Lapwing (United States Navy), which scuttled the vessel.
Koolama	Australia	World War II: The cargo ship was bombed and damaged in the Pacific Ocean off Wyndham, Western Australia by Japanese aircraft. She was beached, but was refloated the next day and taken in to Wyndham.
Lake Osweya	United States	World War II: The cargo ship was torpedoed and sunk in the Atlantic Ocean (43°14′N 64°45′W) by U-96 (Kriegsmarine) with the loss of all 39 of her crew.
Nordvangen	Norway	World War II: The cargo ship was torpedoed and sunk in the Atlantic Ocean (10°50′N 60°54′W) by U-129 (Kriegsmarine) with the loss of all 24 of her crew.
S 53	Kriegsmarine	World War II: The Type 1939/40 schnellboot was severely damaged in a collision with S-39 (Kriegsmarine) during a battle against Royal Navy ships and was scuttled to avoid capture. Seven of her crew were killed.
Scottish Star	United Kingdom	World War II: The cargo ship was torpedoed and sunk in the Atlantic Ocean (13°24′N 49°36′W) by Luigi Torelli (Regia Marina) with the loss of four of her 73 crew.
Sperrbrecher 171 Jason	Kriegsmarine	World War II: The Sperrbrecher was sunk by mines off Calais, France.
Tobelo	Netherlands	World War II: The coaster was bombed and sunk by Japanese aircraft at Kupang, Netherlands East Indies. She was later salvaged by the Japanese and entered service as Tobi Maru.

== 21 February ==
List of shipwrecks: 21 February 1942
Ship	State	Description
Amerika	Germany	World War II: The cargo ship struck a mine in the North Sea east of Terschelling, Friesland, Netherlands. She sank the next day.
Atlanticos	Greece	World War II: The cargo ship struck a mine and sank in the Thames Estuary (51°48′58″N 1°30′37″E) with the loss of one of her 40 crew.
Azalea City	United States	World War II: The cargo ship was torpedoed and sunk in the Caribbean Sea (38°00′N 73°00′W) by U-432 (Kriegsmarine) with the loss of all 38 crew.
Bellevue	United Kingdom	World War II: The fishing trawler (156 GRT) was lost with all eight hands. She was presumed to have been mined and sunk 5 nautical miles (9.3 km) north west of the Turnberry Lighthouse, Ayrshire.
Circe Shell	United Kingdom	World War II: The tanker was torpedoed and sunk in the Atlantic Ocean (11°03′N 62°03′W) by U-161 (Kriegsmarine) with the loss of one of her 58 crew. Survivors were rescued by Busy (United Kingdom). Circe Shell was on a voyage from Glasgow, Renfrewshire to Curaçao, Curaçao and Dependencies.
Kongsgaard	Norway	World War II: The tanker was torpedoed and sunk by U-67 (Kriegsmarine) 7 nautical miles (13 km) north of Port Curaçao, Curaçao and Dependencies with the loss of 38 of her 46 crew.
Kurtuluş	Turkey	The cargo ship sank after being blown onto rocks the previous day off Marmara Island in the Sea of Marmara. Her 34 crew survived.
J. N. Pew	United States	World War II: The tanker was torpedoed and sunk in the Atlantic Ocean (12°40′N 74°00′W) by U-502 (Kriegsmarine) with the loss of 33 of her 36 crew. Survivors were rescued by Anetta I (Panama).
Shokyu Maru	Imperial Japanese Army	World War II: The Shokyu Maru-class auxiliary transport ship was torpedoed and sunk 60 nautical miles (110 km) south of Saishu To, Korea (32°10′N 126°28′E) by USS Triton (United States Navy). Twelver of her crew were killed. Survivors were rescued the next day by Ukishima Maru (Imperial Japanese Navy).

== 22 February ==
List of shipwrecks: 22 February 1942
Ship	State	Description
Adellen	United Kingdom	World War II: Convoy ON 67: The tanker was torpedoed and sunk in the Atlantic Ocean (49°20′N 38°15′W) by U-155 (Kriegsmarine) with the loss of 36 of her 48 crew. Survivors were rescued by HMCS Algoma (Royal Canadian Navy).
Bintang	United Kingdom	World War II: The cargo ship was bombed and sunk in the Atlantic Ocean (31°50′N 26°01′W) by Luftwaffe aircraft with the loss of twelve of her 42 crew.
Cities Service Empire	United States	World War II: The tanker was torpedoed, broke in two, and sank in the Atlantic Ocean 25 miles (40 km) north of the Bethel Shoals Light, Florida 28°25′N 80°02′W by U-128 (Kriegsmarine) with the loss of thirteen of her 50 crew. Survivors were rescued by USS Biddle (United States Navy) and USCGC Vigilant ( United States Coast Guard). The wreck was demolished in 1944.
HMT Eduoard Vlaanderen	Royal Navy	The naval trawler was wrecked on the coast of Iceland.
George L. Torian	Canada	World War II: The cargo ship was torpedoed and sank in the Atlantic Ocean 125 nautical miles (232 km) south south east of Trinidad by U-129 (Kriegsmarine) with the loss of fifteen of her nineteen crew. Survivors were rescued by a United States Navy flying boat.
Hanne	United Kingdom	World War II: The cargo ship was bombed and sunk in the Atlantic Ocean (31°57′N 25°26′E) by Luftwaffe aircraft with the loss of four of her 25 crew.
Kars	United Kingdom	World War II: Convoy HX 175: The tanker was torpedoed and sunk in the Atlantic Ocean (44°15′N 63°25′W) by U-96 (Kriegsmarine) with the loss of 50 of her 52 crew. The ship broke in two three days later, with the bow section sinking. The stern section was beached at Halifax, Nova Scotia, Canada on 27 February. She was declared a total loss. Her Master, 45 crew and four gunners were killed, two survivors were rescued by HMCS Melville (Royal Canadian Navy).
Luisa	Italy	The cargo ship sank in the Strait of Messina after a collision with Enrico Cosenz (Regia Marina). A crew member was lost.
Mount Mycale	Greece	World War II: Convoy SC 17: The cargo ship straggled behind the convoy. She was torpedoed and sunk in the Atlantic Ocean (52°50′N 30°00′W) by U-413 (Kriegsmarine with the loss of all 30 crew.
Norlavore	United States	The cargo ship departed from Puerto la Cruz, Venezuela. No further trace, possibly torpedoed and sunk by U-432 (Kriegsmarine).
Pijnacker Hordijk	Netherlands	World War II: The cargo ship was torpedoed and sunk in the Java Sea south of Tjilatjap, Netherlands East Indies by I-58 (Imperial Japanese Navy).
Republic	United States	World War II: The tanker was torpedoed and damaged in the Atlantic Ocean 3.5 nautical miles (6.5 km) north east of the Jupiter Inlet Lighthouse, Florida (27°05′N 80°05′W) by U-504 (Kriegsmarine) with the loss of five of her 39 crew. Survivors were rescued by Cities Service Missouri (United States) or reached land in their lifeboats. Republic came ashore off Hobe Sound and broke in two the next day.
Sama	Norway	World War II: Convoy ON 67: The cargo ship was torpedoed and sunk in the Atlantic Ocean (49°20′N 38°15′W) by U-155 (Kriegsmarine) with the loss of 20 of the 39 people aboard. Survivors were rescued by USS Nicholson (United States Navy).
Torungen	Norway	World War II: The cargo ship was torpedoed and sunk in the Atlantic Ocean (44°00′N 63°30′W) by U-96 (Kriegsmarine) with the loss of all nineteen crew.
YM-4	United States Navy	World War II: The self-propelled dredger was lost to enemy action off Luzon, Philippines.

== 23 February ==
List of shipwrecks: 23 February 1942
Ship	State	Description
Çankaya	Turkey	World War II: The cargo ship was shelled and sunk in the Black Sea by Shch-213 (Soviet Navy). Çankaya was on a voyage from Istanbul to Zonguldak and Varna, Bulgaria.
Kommunist	Soviet Union	The cargo ship ran aground and was wrecked between Novorossiisk and Sevastopol.
Lennox	Canada	World War II: The cargo ship was torpedoed and sunk in the Atlantic Ocean north east of Barima, Venezuela (9°15′N 58°30′W) by U-129 (Kriegsmarine) with the loss of two of her twenty crew. Survivors were rescued by Athelrill (United Kingdom).
Lihue	United States	World War II: The cargo ship was torpedoed and damaged in the Caribbean Sea 275 nautical miles (509 km) west of Martinique by U-161 (Kriegsmarine). Her 45 crew abandoned ship and were rescued by British Governor (United Kingdom). An attempt was made by USS Partridge (United States Navy) to tow her to Saint Lucia, but she sank on 26 February.
HMS P38	Royal Navy	World War II: The U-class submarine was depth charged and sunk in the Mediterranean Sea 90 nautical miles (170 km) east of Tripoli, Libya by Circe, Emanuele Pessagno, and Antoniotto Usodimare (all Regia Marina) with the loss of all 32 crew.
Sun	United States	World War II: The tanker was torpedoed and damaged in the Caribbean Sea 54 nautical miles (100 km) north of Aruba, Netherlands Antilles (13°02′N 70°41′W) by U-506 (Kriegsmarine) and was abandoned by her 36 crew. She was later reboarded and sailed to Aruba for temporary repairs. Later repaired and returned to service.
Thalia	Panama	World War II: The tanker was torpedoed, shelled and sunk in the Caribbean Sea off Moncos Island (13°00′N 70°45′W) by U-502 (Kriegsmarine) with the loss of one of her 41 crew.
W. D. Anderson	United States	World War II: The tanker was torpedoed and damaged in the Atlantic Ocean (27°09′N 79°56′W) by U-504 (Kriegsmarine) with the loss of 34 of her 35 crew. The survivor was rescued by an American fishing vessel. W. D. Anderson later sank at 27°09′N 80°15′W.
West Zeda	United States	World War II: The cargo ship was torpedoed and sunk in the Atlantic Ocean 125 nautical miles (232 km) south east of Trinidad (9°13′N 59°04′W) by U-129 (Kriegsmarine). All 35 crew were rescued by the schooner Emeralda ( (Saint Vincent and the Grenadines) Saint Vincent).
Wuchang	United Kingdom	World War II: The cargo ship departed from Tjilatjap, Netherlands East Indies for Colombo, Ceylon. No further trace, presumed lost by enemy action.

== 24 February ==
List of shipwrecks: 24 February 1942
Ship	State	Description
Anadara	United Kingdom	World War II: Convoy ON 67: The tanker was torpedoed and damaged in the Atlantic Ocean east of Halifax, Nova Scotia, Canada (43°45′N 43°15′W) by U-558 (Kriegsmarine). She then straggled behind the convoy and was torpedoed and sunk at 43°57′N 44°45′W on 26 February by U-587 (Kriegsmarine) with the loss of all 62 of her crew.
Columbia	United States	World War II: The dredge was seized by the Japanese after the Battle of Wake Island. Destroyed by naval gunfire from the cruisers Northampton (United States Navy) and Salt Lake City (United States Navy) during a U.S. carrier raid.
Eidanger	Norway	World War II: Convoy ON 67: The tanker was torpedoed and sunk in the Atlantic Ocean (44°11′N 43°25′W) by U-558 (Kriegsmarine). Her 39 crew were rescued by Toward (United Kingdom).
Empire Celt	United Kingdom	World War II: Convoy ON 67: The tanker was torpedoed and damaged in the Atlantic Ocean by U-158 (Kriegsmarine) with the loss of six of her 53 crew. Survivors were rescued by Citadelle ( Canada) and HMT St Zeno (Royal Navy). Empire Celt was taken in tow but later broke in two, with the bow section sinking. The tug Foundation Franklin ( Canada) was sent to salvage the stern section but it also sank at 43°50′N 43°38′W.
Empire Hail	United Kingdom	World War II: The cargo ship was torpedoed and sunk in the Atlantic Ocean east of St John's, Dominion of Newfoundland (44°48′N 40°21′W) by U-94 (Kriegsmarine) with the loss of all 49 of her crew.
RFA Finnanger	Royal Fleet Auxiliary	World War II: Convoy ON 67: The tanker was torpedoed and sunk in the Atlantic Ocean (43°45′N 42°15′W) by U-558 (Kriegsmarine) with the loss of all hands.
Inverarder	United Kingdom	World War II: Convoy ON 67: The tanker was torpedoed and sunk in the Atlantic Ocean (44°34′N 42°37′W) by U-558 (Kriegsmarine). Her 42 crew were rescued by Empire Flame (United Kingdom).
Kota Radja	Netherlands	World War II: The cargo ship was bombed and set afire off Surabaya, Netherlands East Indies by Japanese aircraft. She was scuttled by HNLMS Krakatau (Royal Netherlands Navy).
La Estrella Caltex	Philippines	World War II: The cargo ship was sunk in an air raid off Lubang Island.
Mitakara Maru No.1 Go	Imperial Japanese Navy	The auxiliary guard boat was lost on this date.
Norlavore	United States	The cargo ship apparently sank in a storm. She was on a voyage from Baltimore, Maryland to a port in Venezuela.
Snark	Panama	World War II: The cargo ship struck a mine in the Pacific Ocean off the Amédée Lighthouse, New Caledonia. She was beached near the lighthouse but broke in two and was declared a total loss. Her crew were rescued by USS Worden (United States Navy).
Struma	Panama	World War II: The merchant ship was torpedoed and sunk in the Black Sea off Yam Burnu, Turkey (41°23′N 29°13′E) by Shch-213 (Soviet Navy) with the loss of all ten crew and all but one of at least 768 Jewish refugees aboard.
White Crest	United Kingdom	World War II: Convoy ON 67: The cargo ship straggled behind the convoy. She was torpedoed and sunk in the Atlantic Ocean (47°45′N 38°15′W) by U-162 (Kriegsmarine) with the loss of all 47 of her crew.

== 25 February ==
List of shipwrecks: 25 February 1942
Ship	State	Description
Boero	Netherlands	World War II: The cargo ship was torpedoed and sunk south of the Sunda Strait by I-58 (Imperial Japanese Navy). Her 70 crew made it ashore to Java Head where they were prescued on 28 February by HMAS Bendigo and HMAS Burnie (both Royal Australian Navy).
Esso Copenhagen	Panama	World War II: The tanker was torpedoed and sunk in the Atlantic Ocean (10°32′N 53°20′W) by Luigi Torelli (Regia Marina) with the loss of one of her 39 crew.
La Carriere	United Kingdom	World War II: The tanker was torpedoed and sunk in the Atlantic Ocean (16°35′N 75°20′W) by U-156 (Kriegsmarine) with the loss of fifteen of her 41 crew.
Raritan	United States	The cargo ship was wrecked on the Frying Pan Shoals, off Cape Fear, North Carolina.

== 26 February ==
List of shipwrecks: 26 February 1942
Ship	State	Description
Cabedello	Brazil	World War II: The cargo ship was torpedoed and sunk in the Atlantic Ocean (16°00′N 42°30′W) by Leonardo da Vinci (Regia Marina). All 54 hands were lost.
Cassimir	United States	The Design 1022 ship, converted into a tanker, was sunk in the Atlantic Ocean (33°28′N 77°34′W) 48 miles (77 km) off the Frying Pan Shoals in a collision with freighter Lara (United States). Her crew survived.
Mamura	Netherlands	World War II: The tanker was torpedoed and sunk in the Atlantic Ocean (29°00′N 76°20′W) by U-504 (Kriegsmarine) with the loss of all 49 of her crew.
Monte Sarmiento	Kriegsmarine	World War II: The accommodation ship, a former Monte-class passenger ship, was bombed, set afire and severely damaged at Kiel, Germany by Royal Air Force aircraft. Of the approximately 500 men aboard, there were fifteen killed, 23 missing and 46 wounded. She was refloated in 1943 and consequently scrapped.
Starke	Sweden	World War II: The train ferry struck a mine and sank the next night in the Baltic Sea off Saßnitz, Germany. There were no casualties. She was raised in 1943, and after repairs resumed service in 1946.
Wosung	Flag unknown	World War II: The cargo ship was shelled and sunk in the Java Sea by Imperial Japanese Navy warships.
No. 262	Japan	The fireboat flooded and sank near the Bellaton Square Lighthouse.

== 27 February ==
List of shipwrecks: 27 February 1942
Ship	State	Description
Agios Charalambos	Greece	World War II: The caïque (68 GRT) was shelled and sunk in the Myrtoan Sea north of Monemvasia (36°52′N 23°06′E) by HMS Turbulent (Royal Navy). Of the twenty people aboard (four crew and 16 passengers), only 3 passengers survived.
HNLMS Ben-2	Royal Netherlands Navy	World War II: The auxiliary tanker (913 GRT) was torpedoed and sunk in the Indian Ocean 25 nautical miles (46 km) southwest of Banyuwangi, Java, Netherlands East Indies by I-53 (Imperial Japanese Navy).
HNLMS De Ruyter	Royal Netherlands Navy	World War II: Battle of the Java Sea: The De Ruyter-class cruiser was torpedoed and sunk in the Java Sea by Haguro (Imperial Japanese Navy) with the loss of 345 of her 435 crew.
HMS Electra	Royal Navy	World War II: Battle of the Java Sea: The E-class destroyer was sunk in the Java Sea with the loss of 121 of her 173 crew.
Fernside	United Kingdom	World War II: The coaster was bombed and sunk in the North Sea off Banff, Aberdeenshire.
HNLMS Java	Royal Netherlands Navy	World War II: Battle of the Java Sea: The Java-class cruiser was torpedoed and sunk in the Java Sea by Nachi (Imperial Japanese Navy) with the loss of 500 of her 526 crew.
HMS Jeram	Royal Navy	World War II: The minesweeping naval whaler was sunk in an air raid at Tjilatjap, Java.
HMS Jupiter	Royal Navy	World War II: Battle of the Java Sea: The J-class destroyer struck a mine and sank north of Java.
HNLMS Kortenaer	Royal Netherlands Navy	World War II: Battle of the Java Sea: The Admiralen-class destroyer was torpedoed and sunk in the Java Sea by Haguro (Imperial Japanese Navy) with the loss of 40 of her 153 crew.
USS Langley	United States Navy	World War II: The seaplane tender and aircraft transport was bombed and damaged by Japanese aircraft in the Indian Ocean south of Java with the loss of sixteen of her 468 crew. She was scuttled by USS Edsall and USS Whipple (both United States Navy) due to damage sustained.
Lido	Italy	World War II: The cargo ship (1,243 GRT) was shelled in the Mediterranean Sea south of Corfu, Greece by HMS Torbay (Royal Navy). Eight men were killed aboard and the survivors abandoned the burning ship that ran aground near Cape Kastrosikia, north of Preveza. The wreck was refloated on 26 November 1942 and towed to Preveza and later Venice, but was not repaired until the end of the war.
MacGregor	United Kingdom	World War II: The tanker was sunk by gunfire in the Atlantic Ocean (19°50′N 69°40′W) by U-156 (Kriegsmarine) with the loss of one of her 31 crew. Survivors were rescued by a San Domingo Coast Guard cutter.
Marore	United States	World War II: The cargo ship was torpedoed and sunk in the Atlantic Ocean (35°33′N 74°58′W) by U-432 (Kriegsmarine). Her 39 crew were rescued by USCGC CG-3843 ( United States Coast Guard) and John D. Gill (United States).
Nam Yong	United Kingdom	World War II: The cargo ship was torpedoed and sunk in the Indian Ocean (15°55′S 108°05′E) by Imperial Japanese Navy submarine I-54 or I-59 (both Imperial Japanese Navy). Five or her crew were taken as prisoners of war.
R.P. Resor	United States	World War II: The tanker was torpedoed and sunk in the Atlantic Ocean 30 nautical miles (56 km) east of the Barnegat Lighthouse, New Jersey (39°47′N 73°26′W) by U-578 (Kriegsmarine) with the loss of seven gunners and 40 crew. The survivors, a gunner and a crewman, were rescued by USCGC CG-4344 ( United States Coast Guard).
Tembien	Italy	World War II: The cargo ship was torpedoed and sunk in the Mediterranean Sea 24 nautical miles (44 km) west of Tripoli, Libya (32°55′N 12°42′E) by HMS Upholder (Royal Navy). The captain of HMS Upholder was unaware that Tembien was carrying Commonwealth prisoners of war, captured in Operation Crusader at Tobruk, of whom hundreds died in the sinking.
NM-01 Vandale	Kriegsmarine	World War II: The Steiermark-class naval whaler / vorpostenboot was torpedoed and sunk in the Laksefjord (71°06′N 26°57′E) by ShCh-402 (Soviet Navy) with the loss of 24 of her 34 crew.

== 28 February ==
List of shipwrecks: 28 February 1942
Ship	State	Description
Bayou	Panama	World War II: The cargo ship was torpedoed and sunk in the Atlantic Ocean (8°08′N 55°14′W) by U-129 (Kriegsmarine) with the loss of all but one of her crew.
City of Manchester	United Kingdom	World War II: The cargo ship was torpedoed and sunk in the Indian Ocean off Tjilatjap, Java, Netherlands East Indies (8°16′S 108°52′E) by I-53 (Imperial Japanese Navy) with the loss of three of the 137 people aboard. Six survivors were taken as prisoners of war. Other survivors were rescued by the minesweepers USS Lark and USS Whippoorwill (both United States Navy).
Everasma	Latvia	World War II: The cargo ship was torpedoed and sunk in the Atlantic Ocean (approximately 17°N 48°W) by Leonardo da Vinci (Regia Marina). Fifteen of her crew were rescued. (See Latvian Mercantile Marine in WWII)
I-5	Imperial Japanese Navy	The Type J1 Modified-class submarine ran aground on a reef in the north passage of Staring Bay, Kendari, Celebes. She was refloated on 20 March 1942. Repaired and returned to service by 25 March.
USS Jacob Jones	United States Navy	World War II: The Wickes-class destroyer was torpedoed and sunk in the Atlantic Ocean off Cape May, New Jersey (38°37′N 74°32′W), by U-578 (Kriegsmarine) with the loss of 102 of her 113 crew. Survivors were rescued by USS Eagle Boat 56 (United States Navy).
Kasii Maru	Japan	The cargo ship was sunk in a collision.
Leif	Norway	World War II: The cargo ship was torpedoed and sunk in the Atlantic Ocean (34°45′N 69°20′W) by U-653 (Kriegsmarine) with the loss of eighteen of her 28 crew. Survivors were rescued by Sveadrott (Sweden).
Mayon	United States	The cargo ship was sunk at Butuan, Mindanao, Philippines, near the mouth of the Agusan River by unknown causes.
Oregon	United States	World War II: The tanker was sunk by gunfire in the Atlantic Ocean (20°44′N 67°52′W) by U-156 (Kriegsmarine) with the loss of six of her 36 crew. Four survivors were rescued by Gulfpenn (United States), the rest reached land in their lifeboat.
HNLMS Reiger	Royal Netherlands Navy	The Merel-class patrol vessel was wrecked north west of Java.
HNLMS Schouten	Royal Netherlands Navy	World War II: The auxiliary anti-aircraft vessel was scuttled by her crew to prevent capture in shallow waters in the Madura Strait. She was salvaged by the Japanese in 1942, repaired and returned to service as Suiten Maru.
HNLMS Sirius	Royal Netherlands Navy	World War II: The Sirius-class patrol vessel was sunk north west of Java by Japanese aircraft.
HMS Surprise	Royal Navy	The armed yacht burned and capsized on this date.
Thyra	Sweden	World War II: The cargo ship struck a mine in the North Sea off Great Yarmouth, Norfolk, United Kingdom. She was taken in tow, but consequently sank (51°56′00″N 1°37′54″E). Her 24 crew were rescued.
Tomohon	Netherlands	World War II: The coaster was shelled and sunk off Tjilatjap by Arashi and Nowaki (both Imperial Japanese Navy). Her 30 crew were rescued.
War Sirdar	United Kingdom	World War II: The Standard British WWI type tanker was torpedoed and damaged, or ran aground on a reef, in the Sunda Strait. She was beached on Agenielien Island, Netherlands East Indies (5°31′S 106°36′E), on 1 March. War Sirdar was declared a total loss. She was refloated, and repaired between March and June 1942 and put in Imperial Japanese Army service as Honan Maru.
Unnamed, (possibly Ban Ho Guan)	Flag unknown (Netherlands)	World War II: An unidentified cargo ship, possibly Ban Ho Guan, was torpedoed and sunk in the Java Sea off Bali, Netherlands East Indies by I-4 (Imperial Japanese Navy).

== Unknown date ==
List of shipwrecks: Unknown date 1942
Ship	State	Description
HMS Dowgate	Royal Navy	World War II: Battle of Singapore: The Moorgate-class gate vessel was scuttled in February at Singapore to prevent capture.
I-23	Imperial Japanese Navy	The Type B1 submarine went missing in the area of the Territory of Hawaii between 24 and 28 February. She probably sank in a diving accident.
HMS LCP(L) 180, HMS LCP(L) 181, HMS LCP(L) 182, HMS LCP(L) 183, HMS LCP(L) 184, and HMS LCP(L) 185	Royal Navy	World War II: Battle of Singapore: The Landing Craft Personnel (Large) were lost or scuttled at Singapore sometime in February.
HMS Ludgate	Royal Navy	World War II: Battle of Singapore: The Moorgate-class gate vessel was scuttled in February at Singapore to prevent capture.
M 7	United Kingdom	World War II: Battle of Singapore: The incomplete M-class minesweeper was scuttled at Singapore sometime in February.
MMS 52	United Kingdom	World War II: Battle of Singapore: The incomplete MMS-class minesweeper was scuttled at Vaughan Shipbuilding, Singapore.
MMS 93, MMS 94, MMS 125, MMS 126, MMS 127, MMS 128, MMS 166	United Kingdom	World War II: Battle of Singapore: The incomplete MMS-class minesweepers were destroyed on the stocks at United Shipbuilding, or were scuttled, at Singapore.
HMS Penghambat	Royal Navy	World War II: Battle of Singapore: The motor launch was scuttled at Singapore sometime in February.
HMS Peningat	Royal Navy	World War II: Battle of Singapore: The motor launch was scuttled at Singapore sometime in February.
HMS Shun An	Royal Navy	World War II: Battle of Singapore: The small craft was scuttled at Singapore sometime in February.
Sin Kheng Seng	Straits Settlements	World War II: Battle of Singapore: The coaster was sunk at Singapore by the Japanese.
HMAV Sir Hastings Anderson	British Army	World War II: The target-towing vessel sailed from Singapore 14 February and was sunk shortly thereafter in a Japanese air raid.
HMS Solen	Royal Navy	World War II: Battle of Singapore: The examination vessel was scuttled at Singapore sometime in February.
