= MV Cape of Good Hope =

British tramp ship sunk in 1942

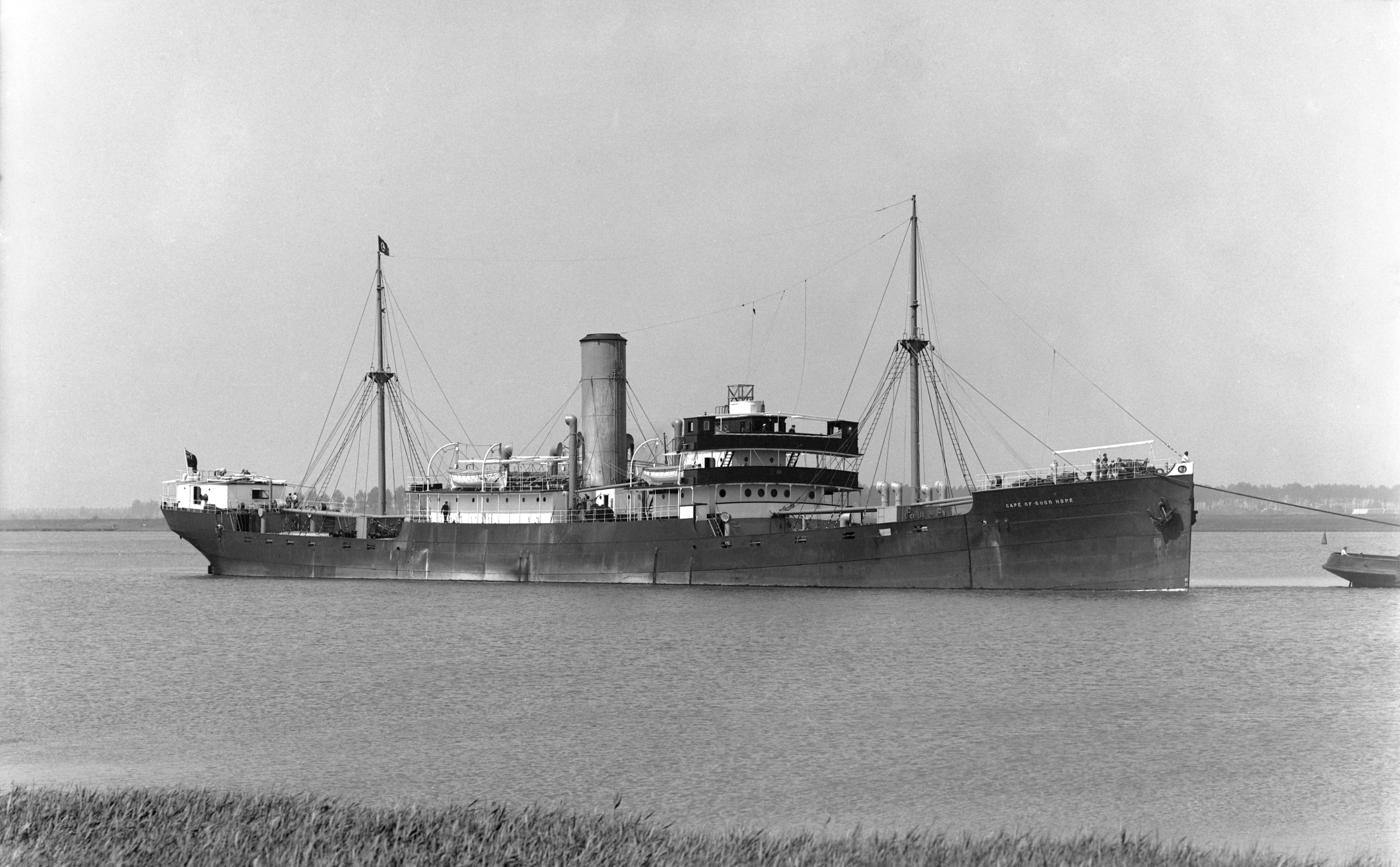
- Cape of Good Hope, probably in the Scheldt

History

United Kingdom
- Name: Cape of Good Hope
- Namesake: Cape of Good Hope
- Owner: Cape of Good Hope Motorship Co Ltd
- Operator: Lyle Shipping Co
- Port of registry: Glasgow
- Builder: Lithgows, Port Glasgow
- Yard number: 771
- Launched: 26 February 1925
- Completed: June 1925
- Identification: UK official number 148862; until 1933: code letters KSRC; by 1930: call sign GLBD
- Fate: sunk by torpedo, 1942

General characteristics
- Type: motor tramp
- Tonnage: 4,963 GRT, 3,157 NRT
- Length: 405.0 ft (123.4 m)
- Beam: 52.2 ft (15.9 m)
- Depth: 27.5 ft (8.4 m)
- Installed power: 1 × 4-stroke diesel engine, 490 NHP
- Propulsion: 1 × screw
- Speed: 10 1/2 knots (19 km/h)
- Crew: 1942: 37, including at least 3 DEMS gunners
- Sensors & processing systems: by 1930: wireless direction finding; by 1934: as above, plus echo sounding device
- Notes: sister ship: Cape York

MV Cape of Good Hope was a UK motor tramp. She was built in Scotland in 1925, and sunk by a U-boat in the western Atlantic in 1942. All of her crew survived in two lifeboats. Each boat crossed hundreds of miles of ocean, and safely reached land in the Antilles. For this, her master and chief officer were awarded the King's Commendation for Brave Conduct.

== Building ==
Lithgows in Port Glasgow on the River Clyde built the ship as yard number 771. She was launched on 26 February 1925, and completed that June. Her registered length was 405.0 ft (123.4 m), her beam was 52.2 ft (15.9 m), and her depth was 27.5 ft (8.4 m). Her tonnages were 4,963 gross register tons (GRT) and 3,157 net register tons (NRT). She had a single screw, driven by a six-cylinder, four-stroke, single-acting diesel engine built by John G. Kincaid & Company of Greenock. It was rated at 490 nominal horsepower, and gave her a speed of 10 1/2 knots (19.4 km/h).

The Lyle Shipping Company of Glasgow were Cape of Good Hope's managers. A few months later, Lithgows built a sister ship for the same owners. Cape York was launched on 5 August 1925, and completed in January 1926. She was 5 feet (1.5 m) longer than Cape of Good Hope, and 1.8 feet (0.55 m) broader in beam, but otherwise identical. In 1929, Lithgows built a third motor ship for Lyle, launched on 7 March and completed that May. Cape Horn was slightly larger again, being 425.0 ft (129.5 m) long, with a beam of 52.2 ft (15.9 m), and a depth of 28.9 ft (8.8 m). She differed also by having an eight-cylinder Burmeister & Wain-type engine.

== Registration and equipment ==
Each ship in the Lyle fleet was owned by a different single-ship company. The Cape of Good Hope Motorship Co, Ltd owned Cape of Good Hope. She was registered in Glasgow. Her UK official number was 148862, and until 1933 her code letters were KSRC. By 1930 her call sign was GLBD, and by 1934 this had superseded her code letters. She was equipped with wireless direction finding by 1930, and an echo sounding device by 1934.

== Loss ==
On 5 May 1942, Cape of Good Hope left New York unescorted carrying 7,500 tons of general and military cargo for Abadan in Allied-occupied Iran, via Cape Town, Basra, and Bandar Shapur (now Bandar-e Emam Khomeyni). Her general cargo included 2,150 tons of Canadian wheat for the British Food Mission. Her military cargo included 3,740 tons for the British Purchasing Commission. There were five Martin Baltimore light bombers; 12 M3 Stuart light tanks; 38 Mack military trucks; 50 tons of 37 mm guns; 68 30-calibre machine guns; 307,500 rounds of 5-calibre ammunition; and 41,983 anti-tank mines.

On 11 May, Cape of Good Hope was making 10.2 knots (18.9 km/h) on a bearing of 161 degrees. She was steering a straight course, and not zig-zagging. At 14:43 hrs ship's time (19:43 hrs Berlin time), U-502 torpedoed Cape of Good Hope in the western Atlantic at position 22°48′N 58°43′W. The explosion threw the tramp's crew about. One of the DEMS gunners fell from an upper deck, breaking his ankle. The torpedo hit one of the holds that contained grain, and not munitions. One of the wireless telegraphists transmitted an SOS message, and the crew launched two lifeboats. Her Master, Captain Alexander Campbell, commanded one boat, and her chief officer, James Hamilton, commanded the other.

The boats lay to, about 2 nautical miles (3.7 km) from the ship. U-502 then surfaced, and fired 20 rounds from her 105 mm deck gun. At 15:35, ship's time, one of these hit the hold that contained ammunition. Cape of Good Hope exploded and sank. U-502 came over to the lifeboats. The commander, Kapitänleutnant Jürgen von Rosenstiel, offered for the U-boat's doctor to splint the injured gunner's ankle. His offer was declined, so the doctor handed over bandages and pills instead. That evening, the survivors were evenly redistributed between the two lifeboats: 18 in Captain Campbell's boat, and 19 in Chief Officer Hamilton's.

== Survival ==
The boats were stocked with food that the survivors estimated would last about seven days. There were rations of hardtack, corned beef, and condensed milk. However, they were concerned that they might not have enough drinking water. Each boat had a mast and sail, and set a course southwest toward the nearest land.

At 10:30 hrs on 13 May, a Consolidated PBY Catalina circled the two boats, and dropped a canister that contained supplies, including chocolate. With the supplies was a note that said "Assistance is en route. Will arrive tonight or tomorrow morning. Remain on course 240 True continually. If assistance doesn’t arrive tomorrow, don’t worry – we can find you any time. Good luck." However, after that, the weather deteriorated, and a southwesterly gale drove the boats away from the nearest land. After another two days, the two boats separated. On Captain Campbell's boat, survivors put a sea anchor over the bow to try to slow their drift away from land. They attached an oil bag to the sea anchor, which helped to calm the water around the boat. One night, the boat lost its rudder, and improvised by steering with an oar. The boat also almost ran out of drinking water. The survivors became dehydrated, and had difficulty swallowing.

On 23 May, Captain Campbell's boat sighted Virgin Gorda in the British Virgin Islands. The crew started to row ashore, but sighted dangerous reefs, and which forced them to turn away. The next morning, they tried to reach land again. Mid-morning, they sighted a sloop, Sparrow. A Martin PBM Mariner aircraft sighted the lifeboat, and Sparrow took it in tow. At 19:00 hrs that evening, they reached Road Town, the capital of Tortola. This is one of the pieces of land nearest to where Cape of Good Hope was sunk. However, it was a journey of more than 400 nautical miles (740 km) in an open boat, over a period of 11 days.

Chief Officer Hamilton's boat took a slightly more westerly course. On 29 May, after 18 days at sea, it reached Burgentra, near Puerto Plata on the coast of the Dominican Republic. This is nearly 700 nautical miles (1,300 km) southwest of where Cape of Good Hope was sunk. They were taken to the capital, Santo Domingo. Hamilton's survivors included the injured Royal Navy gunner. He was hospitalised in the Dominican Republic, and later flown to the United States. The other survivors from Hamilton's boat were flown to Miami, where the United States Navy's Office of Naval Intelligence interviewed them. The survivors complained that they could not understand why a ship with a valuable military cargo was not escorted and protected.

The second officer, Neil MacNeil, wrote a detailed first-hand account of the sinking, and of survival and rescue in Captain Campbell's lifeboat. On 5 January 1943, Captain Campbell and Chief Officer Hamilton were each awarded the King's Commendation for Brave Conduct.

== Bibliography ==
- Lloyd's Register of Shipping. Vol. II.–Steamers and Motorships. London: Lloyd's Register of Shipping. 1926 – via Internet Archive.
- Lloyd's Register of Shipping (PDF). Vol. II.–Steamers and Motorships of 300 Tons Gross and Over. London: Lloyd's Register of Shipping. 1930 – via Southampton City Council.
- Lloyd's Register of Shipping (PDF). Vol. II.–Steamers and Motorships of 300 Tons Gross and Over. London: Lloyd's Register of Shipping. 1934 – via Southampton City Council.
- Mercantile Navy List. London: Registrar General of Shipping and Seamen. 1930 – via Crew List Index Project.
