= Convoy SC 67 =

- Part of World War II
Date	30 January – 15 February 1942
Location	North Atlantic

Belligerents
(Nazi Germany) Germany	Canada; United Kingdom Norway

Commanders and leaders
Admiral Karl Dönitz	Capt E Rees DSC RD RNR

Strength
	28 merchant ships 13 escorts

Casualties and losses
	1 merchant ship sunk 1 warship sunk

Convoy SC 67 was the 67th of the numbered series of World War II Slow Convoys of merchant ships from Sydney, Cape Breton Island to Liverpool. The convoy left Halifax on 30 January 1942 and picked up a tran-Atlantic escort in Newfoundland. This marked the start of the allied end-to-end convoy escort system, which remained in effect until the end of the war. The convoy was found by U-591 on 10 February, and attacked by U-136 of 6th U-boat Flotilla, operating out of St Nazaire. Surviving ships reached Liverpool on 15 February.

== Ships in the convoy ==
=== Merchants ===
Name	Flag	Tonnage (GRT)	Notes
Atlanticos (1919)	Greece	5,446	
Belgique (1902)	Belgium	4,606	
Biafra (1933)	United Kingdom	5,405	Convoy commodore's ship, Capt E Rees DSC RD RNR
Brynymor (1936)	United Kingdom	4,771	
Clunepark (1928)	United Kingdom	3,491	
Empire Beaver (1919)	United Kingdom	6,036	Returned
Empire Leopard (1917)	United Kingdom	5,676	
Empire Livingstone (1941)	United Kingdom	6,997	
Empire Zephyr (1941)	United Kingdom	6,327	
Graiglas (1940)	United Kingdom	4,312	Vice Commodore
Hallanger (1928)	Norway	9,551	
Heina (1925)	Norway	4,028	Sunk by U-136. All crew saved
Lagarfoss (1904)	Iceland	1,211	Oban
Loriga (1919)	United Kingdom	6,665	
Mana (1920)	Honduras	3,283	Returned
Montreal City (1920)	United Kingdom	3,066	
Mount Taurus (1920)	Greece	6,696	
Ozark (1919)	United States	2,689	Iceland
Penolver (1912)	United Kingdom	3,721	
Ruth I	Norway	3,531	
Sirehei (1907)	Norway	3,888	
Spero (1919)	Norway	3,619	Returned
Stone Street (1922)	Panama	6,131	
Stornest (1921)	United Kingdom	4,265	
Tintagel (1923)	United States	2,972	Collision. Towed to St John's by Rescue Tug HMS Prudent
Titanian (1924)	Norway	4,880	
Tore Jarl (1920)	Norway	1,514	Put Back
Wisla (1928)	Poland	3,106	

=== Escorts ===
Name	Flag	Class and type	Period	Notes
HMCS Chilliwack	Royal Canadian Navy	Flower-class corvette	30 January – 11 February	
HMCS Dauphin	Royal Canadian Navy	Flower-class corvette	2 February– 12 February	
HMCS Dunvegan	Royal Canadian Navy	Flower-class corvette	30 January – 2 February	
HMS Gentian	Royal Navy	Flower-class corvette	11 February – 14 February	
HMCS Hamilton	Royal Canadian Navy	Town-class destroyer	30 January – 2 February	
HMS Honeysuckle	Royal Navy	Flower-class corvette	11 February – 15 February	
HMCS Lethbridge	Royal Canadian Navy	Flower-class corvette	8 February – 11 February	
HMCS Louisburg	Royal Canadian Navy	Flower-class corvette	2 February – 11 February	
HMCS Nipigon	Royal Canadian Navy	Bangor-class minesweeper	30 January – 2 February	
HMCS Saskatoon	Royal Canadian Navy	Flower-class corvette	30 January – 2 February	
HMCS Shediac	Royal Canadian Navy	Flower-class corvette	2 February – 11 February	
HMCS Spikenard	Royal Canadian Navy	Flower-class corvette	2 February – 10 February	Sunk by U-136. 57 dead, 8 survivors.
HNoMS St. Albans	Royal Norwegian Navy	Town-class destroyer	11 February – 13 February	

== Bibliography ==
- Hague, Arnold (2000). The Allied Convoy System 1939–1945. ISBN 1-86176-147-3.
- Rohwer, J.; Hummelchen, G. (1992). Chronology of the War at Sea 1939–1945. Naval Institute Press. ISBN 1-55750-105-X.
