= HMAS Toowoomba (FFH 156) =

Anzac-class frigate of Royal Australian Navy

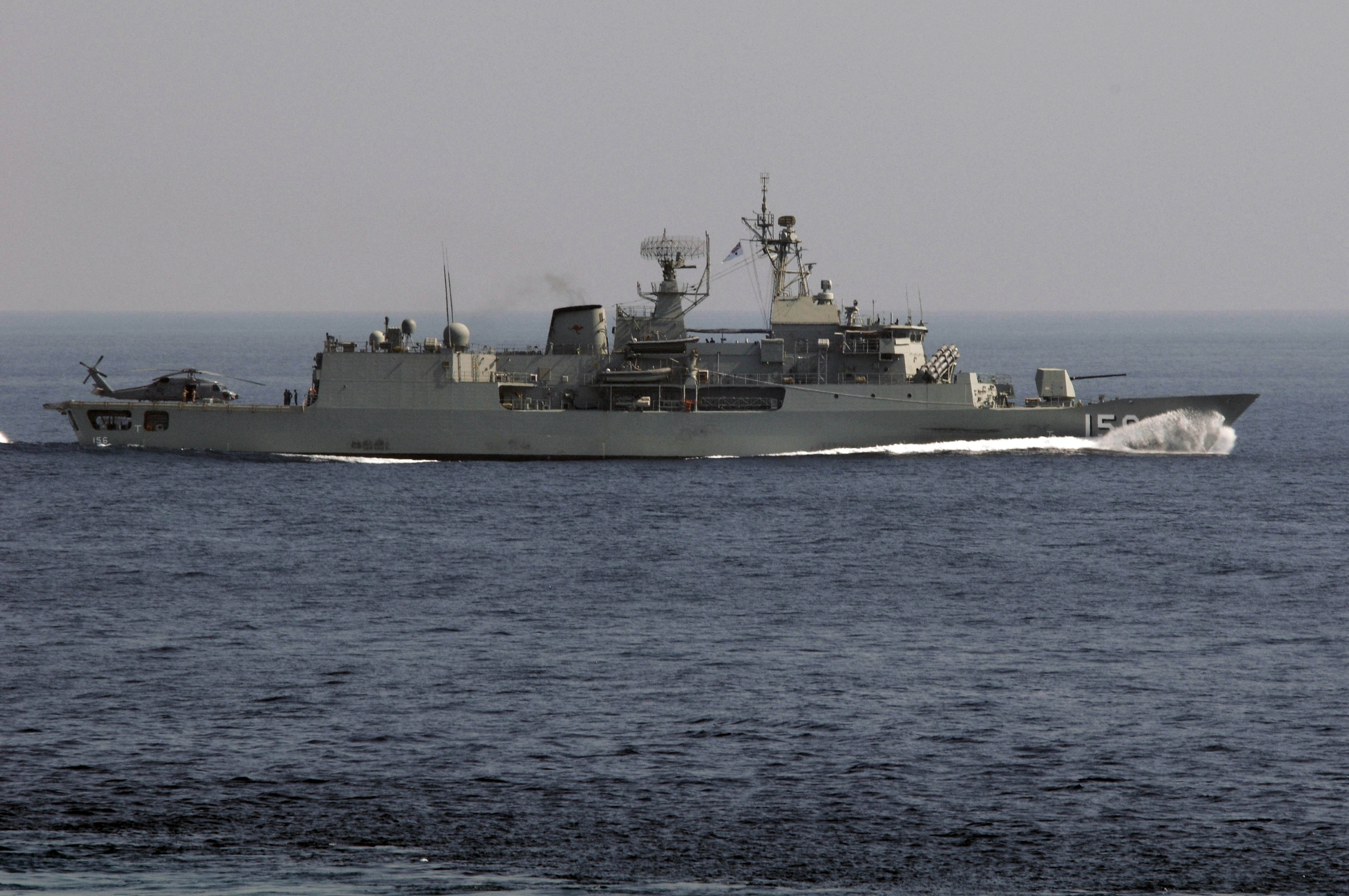
- HMAS Toowoomba (FFH 156)

History

Australia
- Namesake: City of Toowoomba
- Builder: Tenix Defence
- Laid down: 26 July 2002
- Launched: 16 May 2003
- Commissioned: 8 October 2005
- Home port: Fleet Base West
- Identification: MMSI number: 503115000; Callsign: VKLI
- Motto: "Fearless"
- Honours and awards: Two inherited battle honours
- Status: Active as of 2019

General characteristics
- Class & type: Anzac-class frigate
- Displacement: 3,600 tonnes full load
- Length: 118 m (387 ft)
- Beam: 15 m (49 ft)
- Draught: 4 m (13 ft)
- Propulsion: 1 × General Electric LM 2500 gas turbine providing 30,000 hp (22.5 MW); 2 × MTU 12v 1163 TB83 diesels providing 8,840 hp (6.5 MW)
- Speed: 27 knots (50 km/h; 31 mph)
- Range: 6,000 nautical miles (11,000 km; 6,900 mi) at 18 knots (33 km/h; 21 mph)
- Complement: approximately 170 sailors
- Sensors & processing systems: Sonars: Thomson Sintra Spherion B Mod 5; hull-mounted; active search and attack; medium frequency. Provision for towed array; Air search radar: Raytheon AN/SPS-49(V)8 ANZ (C/D-band); Surface search radar: CelsiusTech 9LV 453 TIR (Ericsson Tx/Rx) (G-band); Navigation: Atlas Elektronik 9600 ARPA (I-band)
- Electronic warfare & decoys: ESM: Racal modified Sceptre A (radar intercept), Telefunken PST-1720 Telegon 10 (comms intercept); Countermeasures: Decoys: G & D Aircraft SRBOC Mk 36 Mod 1 decoy launchers for SRBOC
- Armament: Guns and missiles: 1 × 5 in/54 (127 mm) Mk 45 Mod 2 gun, various machine guns and small arms, 2 × 4 Harpoon anti-ship missiles, Mk 41 Mod 5 VLS for Sea Sparrow and Evolved Sea Sparrow; Torpedoes: 2 × triple 324 mm Mk 32 Mod 5 tubes; Fire control: CelsiusTech 9LV 453 (J-band); Combat data systems: CelsiusTech 9LV 453 Mk 3.Link 11; Weapons control: CelsiusTech 9LV 453 optronic director with Raytheon CW Mk 73 Mod 1
- Aircraft carried: 1 × Sikorsky MH-60R Seahawk

HMAS Toowoomba (FFH 156) is the seventh Anzac-class frigate of the Royal Australian Navy (RAN). She was laid down in 2002 by Tenix Defence and commissioned in 2005.

In 2007, Toowoomba was deployed to the Persian Gulf as part of Operation Slipper. Her second deployment to the Middle East occurred during the second half of 2009. As part of this, she became the first RAN vessel to operate with the counter-piracy Combined Task Force 151.

== Design and construction ==
The Anzac class originated from RAN plans to replace the six River-class destroyer escorts with a mid-capability patrol frigate. The Australian shipbuilding industry was thought to be incapable of warship design, so the RAN decided to take a proven foreign design and modify it. Around the same time, the Royal New Zealand Navy (RNZN) was looking to replace four Leander-class frigates; a deterioration in New Zealand-United States relations, the need to improve alliances with nearby nations, and the commonalities between the RAN and RNZN ships' requirements led the two nations to begin collaborating on the acquisition in 1987. Tenders were requested by the Anzac Ship Project at the end of 1986, with 12 ship designs (including an airship) submitted. By August 1987, the tenders were narrowed down in October to Blohm + Voss's MEKO 200 design, the M class (later Karel Doorman class) offered by Royal Schelde, and a scaled-down Type 23 frigate proposed by Yarrow Shipbuilders. In 1989, the Australian government announced that Melbourne-based shipbuilder AMECON (which became Tenix Defence) would build the modified MEKO 200 design. The Australians ordered eight ships, while New Zealand ordered two, with an unexercised option for two more.

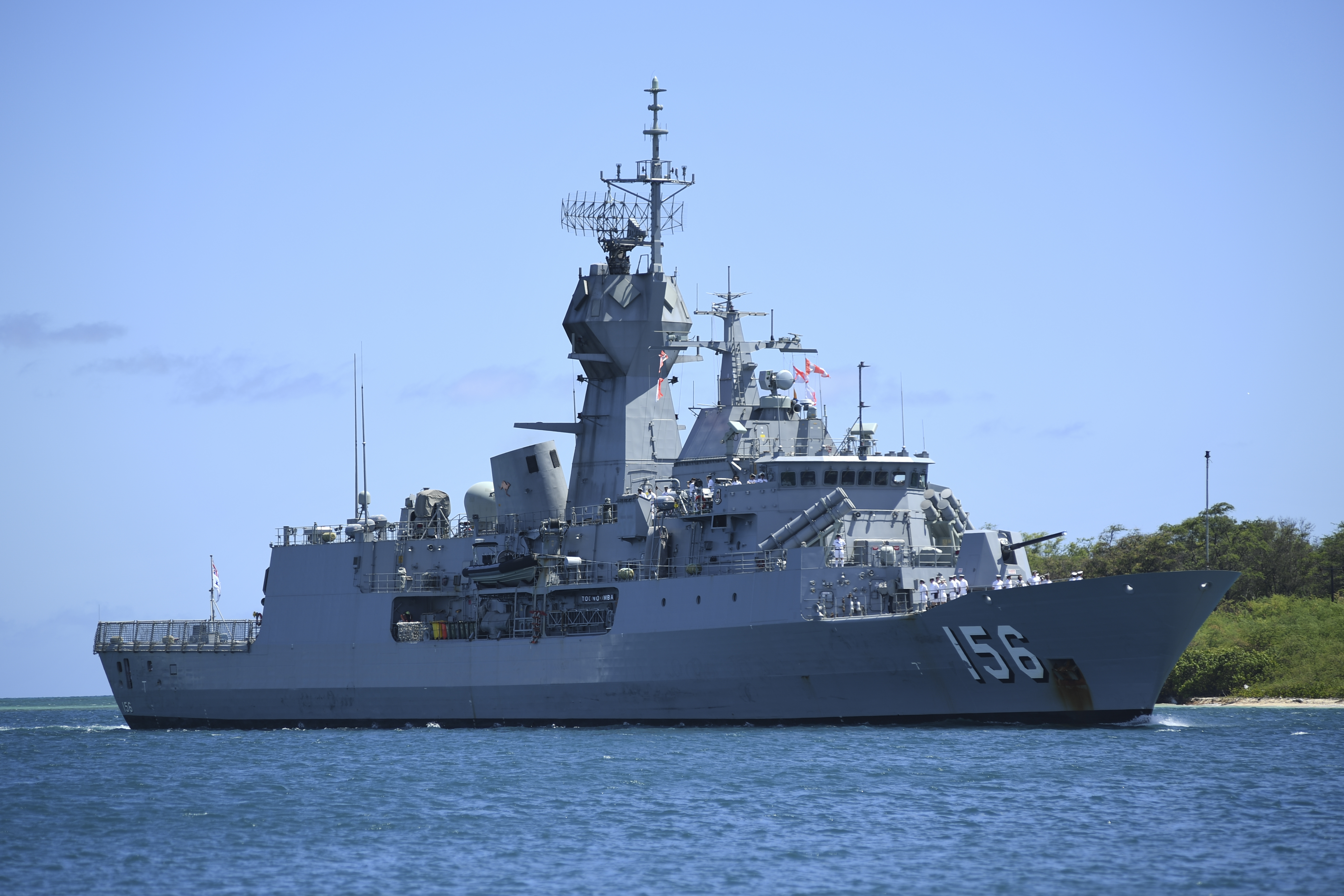
Toowoomba in 2018

The Anzacs are based on Blohm + Voss' MEKO 200 PN (or Vasco da Gama-class) frigates, modified to meet Australian and New Zealand specifications and maximise the use of locally built equipment. Each frigate has a 3,600-tonne (3,500-long-ton; 4,000-short-ton) full load displacement. The ships are 109 metres (358 ft) long at the waterline, and 118 metres (387 ft) long overall, with a beam of 14.8 metres (49 ft), and a full load draught of 4.35 metres (14.3 ft). A Combined Diesel or Gas (CODOG) propulsion machinery layout is used, with a single, 30,172-horsepower (22,499 kW) General Electric LM2500-30 gas turbine and two 8,840-horsepower (6,590 kW) MTU 12V1163 TB83 diesel engines driving the ship's two controllable-pitch propellers. Maximum speed is 27 knots (50 km/h; 31 mph), and maximum range is over 6,000 nautical miles (11,000 km; 6,900 mi) at 18 knots (33 km/h; 21 mph); about 50% greater than other MEKO 200 designs. The standard ship's company of an Anzac consists of 22 officers and 141 sailors.

As designed, the main armament for the frigate is a 5-inch 54 calibre Mark 45 gun, supplemented by an eight-cell Mark 41 vertical launch system (for RIM-7 Sea Sparrow or RIM-162 Evolved Sea Sparrow missiles), two 12.7-millimetre (0.50 in) machine guns, and two Mark 32 triple torpedo tube sets (initially firing Mark 46 torpedoes, but later upgraded to use the MU90 Impact torpedo). They were also designed for but not with a close-in weapons system (two Mini Typhoons fitted when required from 2005 onwards), two quad-canister Harpoon anti-ship missile launchers (which were installed across the RAN vessels from 2005 onwards), and a second Mark 41 launcher (which has not been added). The Australian Anzacs use a Sikorsky S-70B-2 Seahawk helicopter; plans to replace them with Kaman SH-2G Super Seasprites were cancelled in 2008 due to ongoing problems.

Toowoomba was laid down at Williamstown, Victoria on 26 July 2002. The ship was assembled from six hull modules and six superstructure modules; the superstructure modules were fabricated in Whangarei, New Zealand, and hull modules were built at both Williamstown and Newcastle, New South Wales, with final integration at Williamstown. She was launched on 16 May 2003 by Judy Blight, and commissioned into the RAN on 8 October 2005.

== Operational history ==
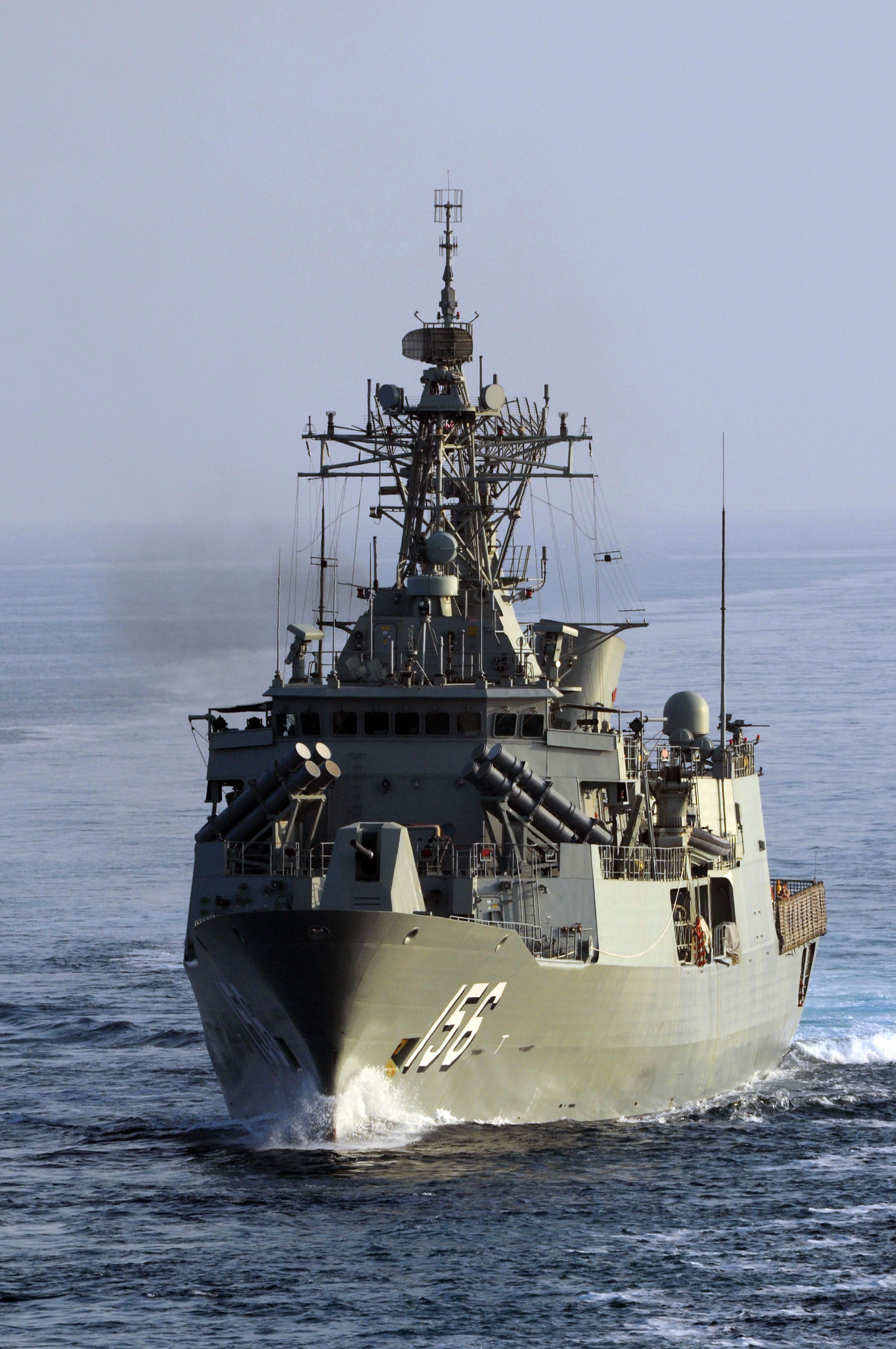
Bow view of Toowoomba during her deployment to the MEAO in 2009-2010

Toowoomba began her first deployment to the Middle East Area of Operations (MEAO) as part of Operation Slipper on 4 January 2007.

On 18 June 2008, the frigate became the first RAN warship to fire an MU90 Impact anti-submarine torpedo, after they replaced the American Mark 46 anti-submarine torpedoes originally fitted.

In June 2009, Toowoomba sailed from Fleet Base West, Western Australia to embark upon the ship's second MEAO deployment. In September, the frigate was assigned to Combined Task Force 151 (CTF-151); Toowoomba was the first Australian warship to work with CTF-151, a US-led, multinational force tasked with protecting merchant vessels from pirate attacks off the coast of Somalia. Toowoomba was assigned to escort merchant shipping and conduct overt patrols in the International Recommended Transit Corridor (IRTC), a shipping lane extending the Gulf of Aden towards the Somali Basin and the Horn of Africa, in support of United Nations Security Council Resolutions 1846 and 1851. The frigate also operated with the counter-terrorism Combined Task Force 150 (CTF-150) in the Arabian Sea.

On 20 September 2009, Toowoomba responded to a call for assistance from the merchant vessel BBC Portugal, and successfully prevented an act of high-seas piracy. A Japanese P-3 Orion aircraft and a naval helicopter from the German frigate Bremen provided surveillance support while Toowoomba closed in. A boarding party from Toowoomba confiscated several weapons from the attackers, including a rocket-propelled grenade launcher, six AK-47 assault rifles, and a G3 assault rifle, before the skiff was directed to leave the IRTC.

Toowoomba returned to Fleet Base West on 7 December 2009, having been relieved in the MEAO by HMAS Stuart. The ship and her company were awarded with a "Certificate for Exceptional Services Rendered to Shipping and Mankind" by the International Maritime Organization in November 2009. The deployment is the subject of Australian Pirate Patrol, a four-episode documentary series produced by Prospero Productions, and first aired on the National Geographic Channel on 18 October 2010.

In early April 2013, Toowoomba operated with the U.S. Navy's Carrier Strike Group Three in the South China Sea.

In late March 2014, Toowoomba was pulled from asylum seeker patrols and directed to join the hunt for the missing Malaysia Airlines flight MH370, allowing HMAS Success to return to port for replenishment.

Toowoomba will be docked in October 2015 to undergo the Anti-Ship Missile Defence (ASMD) upgrade. The upgrade will include the fitting of CEA Technologies' CEAFAR and CEAMOUNT phased array radars on new masts, a Vampir NG Infrared Search and Track system, and Sharpeye Navigational Radar Systems, along with improvements to the operations room equipment and layout.

In early 2020 she was deployed to the Strait of Hormuz during the 2019 Persian Gulf crisis.

In November 2023 Toowoomba operated off Japan as part of Operation Argos, which is Australia's contribution to efforts to enforce sanctions against North Korea. Several RAN divers were slightly injured by sonar from a Chinese warship during this deployment, when the sonar was activated close to the Australian frigate while they were removing a fishing net from its propellers.

In February 2026, Toowoomba visited Jakarta, Indonesia, as part of a defense diplomacy mission organized under a Regional Presence Deployment assignment that began in that month.
