= HMCS Louisburg (K143) =

Flower-class corvette

Coordinates: 36°15′N 00°15′E

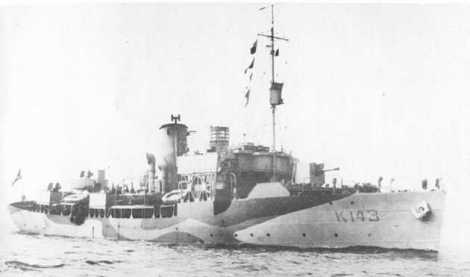
- HMCS Louisburg

History

Canada
- Name: Louisburg
- Namesake: Louisburg, Nova Scotia
- Ordered: 23 January 1940
- Builder: Morton Engineering and Dry Dock Co. Quebec City
- Laid down: 4 October 1940
- Launched: 27 May 1941
- Commissioned: 2 October 1941
- Out of service: 6 February 1943
- Identification: Pennant number: K143
- Honours and awards: Atlantic 1941–42
- Fate: Sunk 6 February 1943

General characteristics
- Class & type: Flower-class corvette
- Displacement: 925 long tons (940 t; 1,036 short tons)
- Length: 205 ft (62.48 m)o/a
- Beam: 33 ft (10.06 m)
- Draught: 11.5 ft (3.51 m)
- Installed power: 2 × fire tube Scotch boilers; 1 × 4-cycle triple-expansion reciprocating steam engine; 2,750 ihp (2,050 kW)
- Propulsion: Single shaft
- Speed: 16 knots (30 km/h; 18 mph)
- Range: 3,500 nmi (6,482 km) at 12 knots (22 km/h; 14 mph)
- Complement: 85
- Sensors & processing systems: 1 × SW1C or 2C radar; 1 × Type 123A or Type 127DV sonar
- Armament: 1 × BL 4 in (102 mm) Mk.IX single gun; 2 × .50 cal machine gun (twin); 2 × Lewis .303 cal machine gun (twin); 2 × Mk.II depth charge throwers; 2 × depth charge rails with 40 depth charges

HMCS Louisburg was a Flower-class corvette that served with the Royal Canadian Navy during the Second World War. She fought mainly as an ocean escort during the Battle of the Atlantic. She was sunk in 1943. She was named for Louisburg, Nova Scotia.

== Background ==
Flower-class corvettes like Louisburg serving with the Royal Canadian Navy during the Second World War were different from earlier and more traditional sail-driven corvettes. The "corvette" designation was created by the French as a class of small warships; the Royal Navy borrowed the term for a period but discontinued its use in 1877. During the hurried preparations for war in the late 1930s, Winston Churchill reactivated the corvette class, needing a name for smaller ships used in an escort capacity, in this case based on a whaling ship design. The generic name "flower" was used to designate the class of these ships, which – in the Royal Navy – were named after flowering plants.

Corvettes commissioned by the Royal Canadian Navy during the Second World War were named after communities for the most part, to better represent the people who took part in building them. This idea was put forth by Admiral Percy W. Nelles. Sponsors were commonly associated with the community for which the ship was named. Royal Navy corvettes were designed as open sea escorts, while Canadian corvettes were developed for coastal auxiliary roles which was exemplified by their minesweeping gear. Eventually the Canadian corvettes would be modified to allow them to perform better on the open seas.

== Construction ==
Louisburg was ordered 23 January 1940 as part of the 1939–1940 Flower-class building program. She was laid down by Morton Engineering and Dry Dock Co. at Quebec City and launched 27 May 1941. She was commissioned 2 October 1941 at Quebec City.

During her brief career, Louisburg underwent two significant refits. The first took place at Halifax from the end of March 1942 until June of that year. The second took place on the Humber in the United Kingdom where she had extra AA fittings added in preparation for her escort duties related to Operation Torch.

== War service ==
After arriving at Halifax for deployment on 15 October 1941, Louisburg was initially assigned to Sydney Force. She remained with them until mid-January 1942. At that time, she was transferred to the Newfoundland Escort Force. In February 1942 she took part in the battle for SC 67. During that battle, her sister ship, HMCS Spikenard was lost. After her refit, she returned to service, now as a mid-ocean escort on convoys between St. John's and Derry.

In September 1942 Louisburg was sent to the United Kingdom as part of the Canadian contribution to Operation Torch. On 9 December 1942 she was rammed by HMS Bideford while anchored at Derry. She spent five weeks in repair yards at Belfast recovering from the damage. Upon her return to service, she was assigned to escort Torch-related convoys.

=== Sinking ===
While escorting a convoy, KMF 8, from Gibraltar to Bone, Algeria, the Louisburg was among those hit by bombs and torpedoes from two formations of enemy aircraft. The first formation was made up of seven Ju 88 bombers and the second seven He 111 armed with torpedoes operating out of Italy. 38 crew were lost when she sank near Oran.
