= German submarine U-502 =

German World War II submarine

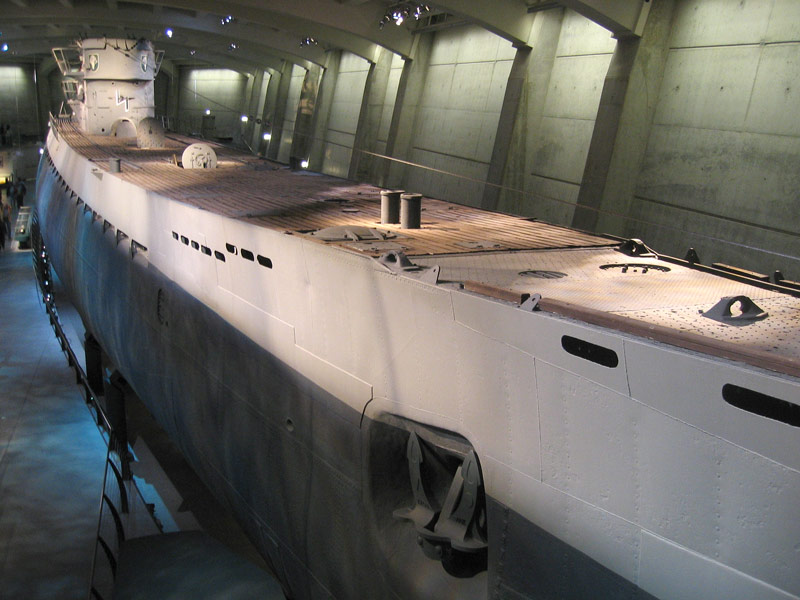
- U-505, a typical Type IXC boat

History

Nazi Germany
- Name: U-502
- Ordered: 25 September 1939
- Builder: Deutsche Werft, Hamburg
- Yard number: 292
- Laid down: 2 April 1940
- Launched: 18 February 1941
- Commissioned: 31 May 1941
- Fate: Sunk on 6 July 1942

General characteristics
- Class & type: Type IXC submarine
- Displacement: 1,120 t (1,100 long tons) surfaced; 1,232 t (1,213 long tons) submerged
- Length: 76.76 m (251 ft 10 in) o/a; 58.75 m (192 ft 9 in) pressure hull
- Beam: 6.76 m (22 ft 2 in) o/a; 4.40 m (14 ft 5 in) pressure hull
- Height: 9.60 m (31 ft 6 in)
- Draught: 4.70 m (15 ft 5 in)
- Installed power: 4,400 PS (3,200 kW; 4,300 bhp) (diesels); 1,000 PS (740 kW; 990 shp) (electric)
- Propulsion: 2 shafts; 2 × diesel engines; 2 × electric motors
- Speed: 18.2 knots (33.7 km/h; 20.9 mph) surfaced; 7.7 knots (14.3 km/h; 8.9 mph) submerged
- Range: 13,450 nmi (24,910 km; 15,480 mi) at 10 knots (19 km/h; 12 mph) surfaced; 64 nmi (119 km; 74 mi) at 4 knots (7.4 km/h; 4.6 mph) submerged
- Test depth: 230 m (750 ft)
- Complement: 4 officers, 44 enlisted
- Armament: 6 × torpedo tubes (4 bow, 2 stern); 22 × 53.3 cm (21 in) torpedoes; 1 × 10.5 cm (4.1 in) SK C/32 deck gun (180 rounds); 1 × 3.7 cm (1.5 in) SK C/30 AA gun; 1 × twin 2 cm FlaK 30 AA guns

Service record
- Part of: 2nd U-boat Flotilla; 31 May 1941 – 6 July 1942
- Identification codes: M 40 307
- Commanders: Kptlt. Jürgen von Rosenstiel; 31 May 1941 – 6 July 1942
- Operations: 4 patrols: 1st patrol: 29 September – 9 November 1941; 2nd patrol: 18 – 22 December 1941; 3rd patrol: 19 January – 16 March 1942; 4th patrol: 22 April – 6 July 1942
- Victories: 14 merchant ships sunk (78,843 GRT); 2 merchant ships damaged (23,797 GRT)

German submarine U-502 was a Type IXC U-boat of Nazi Germany's Kriegsmarine during World War II. The submarine was laid down on 2 April 1940 at the Deutsche Werft yard in Hamburg with yard number 292, launched on 18 February 1941 and commissioned on 31 May under the command of Kapitänleutnant Jürgen von Rosenstiel.

She began her service life under training with the 2nd U-boat Flotilla between 31 May and 1 September 1941 before moving on to operations, also with the 2nd flotilla. U-502 sank fourteen Allied vessels between September 1941 and July 1942 before she was sunk by a British aircraft in the Bay of Biscay on 6 July 1942.

== Design ==
German Type IXC submarines were slightly larger than the original Type IXBs. U-502 had a displacement of 1,120 tonnes (1,100 long tons) when at the surface and 1,232 tonnes (1,213 long tons) while submerged. The U-boat had a total length of 76.76 m (251 ft 10 in), a pressure hull length of 58.75 m (192 ft 9 in), a beam of 6.76 m (22 ft 2 in), a height of 9.60 m (31 ft 6 in), and a draught of 4.70 m (15 ft 5 in). The submarine was powered by two MAN M 9 V 40/46 supercharged four-stroke, nine-cylinder diesel engines producing a total of 4,400 metric horsepower (3,240 kW; 4,340 shp) for use while surfaced, two Siemens-Schuckert 2 GU 345/34 double-acting electric motors producing a total of 1,000 shaft horsepower (1,010 PS; 750 kW) for use while submerged. She had two shafts and two 1.92 m (6 ft) propellers. The boat was capable of operating at depths of up to 230 metres (750 ft).

The submarine had a maximum surface speed of 18.3 knots (33.9 km/h; 21.1 mph) and a maximum submerged speed of 7.3 knots (13.5 km/h; 8.4 mph). When submerged, the boat could operate for 63 nautical miles (117 km; 72 mi) at 4 knots (7.4 km/h; 4.6 mph); when surfaced, she could travel 13,450 nautical miles (24,910 km; 15,480 mi) at 10 knots (19 km/h; 12 mph). U-502 was fitted with six 53.3 cm (21 in) torpedo tubes (four fitted at the bow and two at the stern), 22 torpedoes, one 10.5 cm (4.13 in) SK C/32 naval gun, 180 rounds, and a 3.7 cm (1.5 in) SK C/30 as well as a 2 cm (0.79 in) C/30 anti-aircraft gun. The boat had a complement of forty-eight.

== Service history ==
=== First patrol ===
U-502 departed Kiel on 29 September 1941, and ventured out into the mid-Atlantic. On 7 October, south of Iceland, she torpedoed the 14,795 GRT British ship Svend Foyn, a straggler from Convoy HX 152 en route from New York to Liverpool, carrying fuel oil and aircraft and tanks as deck cargo. The former whale factory ship was damaged, but managed to escape and assisted by the Flower-class corvette HMS Sunflower, reached Reykjavík on 11 October. U-502 arrived in Lorient in occupied France on 9 November.

=== Second patrol ===
U-502 sailed from Lorient on 18 December 1941, but aborted her patrol, having barely left the Bay of Biscay and returned to her French base on the 22nd.

=== Third patrol ===
U-502's next patrol began on 19 January 1942. She sailed for the Caribbean waters north of Venezuela to attack the vital oil trade.

On the morning of 16 February off the Gulf of Venezuela she torpedoed and sank three tankers in as many hours; the British 2,395 GRT Tia Juana, the Venezuelan 2,650 GRT Monagas, and then the British 2,391 GRT San Nicolas.

U-502 struck again on 22 February near Aruba, sinking the American 9,033 GRT tanker J.N. Pew with torpedoes during the night, then the Panamanian 8,329 GRT Thalia with torpedoes and shell-fire that morning. That afternoon she badly damaged the American 9,002 GRT Sun with a single torpedo. The crew initially abandoned ship, but later re-boarded and managed to take her into Aruba to make repairs. The U-boat returned to Lorient on 16 March after 57 days at sea.

=== Fourth patrol ===
Her fourth and final patrol was her most productive. Sailing from Lorient on 22 April 1942, she resumed her predations in the Caribbean Sea.

Her first success came on 11 May, northeast of the Virgin Islands, where she sank the unescorted British 4,963 GRT cargo ship Cape of Good Hope with one torpedo, followed by 20 rounds of 105 mm shell-fire.

She mistakenly sank the unescorted and neutral 4,996 GRT Brazilian merchant ship Gonçalves Dias with two torpedoes about 100 miles south of Ciudad Trujillo on 24 May. The ship was identified as Brazilian only after the attack when the survivors were questioned. On 28 May, about 150 miles south of the Mona Passage, she sank the unescorted American 6,759 GRT Type C1 ship Alcoa Pilgrim, carrying a cargo of bauxite ore, and on 3 June, about 150 miles north-west of Trinidad, she torpedoed the unescorted American 6,940 GRT tanker M.F. Elliott. Hit below the waterline, the ship sank within six minutes.

U-502 attacked Convoy TO-5, en route from Trinidad to Curaçao, on 9 June, about 35 miles north-east of Cape Blanco, Venezuela, sinking the Belgian 5,085 GRT merchant ship Bruxelles, and damaging the American 6,589 GRT tanker Franklin K. Lane to such an extent that it was abandoned and later sunk by gunfire from HMS Churchill.

On 15 June, U-502 struck once again and sank three ships in a single day. The first, at 01:00, was the unescorted American 8,001 GRT merchant ship Scottsburg, hit by two torpedoes about 90 miles west of Grenada. At 04:10, about 100 miles north-west of Trinidad, she sank the unescorted Panamanian 5,010 GRT Hog Islander Cold Harbor, carrying a cargo of tanks, aircraft and ammunition, with two torpedoes. The first torpedo struck the starboard side causing the ammunition in No.2 hold to explode. About 30 minutes later, a second torpedo struck the port side and the ship sank after 15 minutes. Finally, at 20:15 about 30 miles west of Grenada, she sank the unescorted American 5,702 GRT ship West Hardaway with a spread of three torpedoes. Two missed, passing ahead and astern, but the third struck the starboard bow. The ship's Navy Armed Guard returned fire (the ship was armed with a 4-inch (100 mm) gun, four 20 mm guns, and two .30 calibre machine guns), but the ship was hit by another torpedo and sank an hour later. All hands abandoned ship and survived.

==== Sinking ====
U-502 then headed for her base, but at 04:45 on 6 July in the Bay of Biscay, west of La Rochelle, at position 46°10′N 06°40′W, she was sunk by depth charges dropped by a Leigh light-equipped Wellington bomber of No. 172 Squadron RAF. All 52 hands were lost. This was the first confirmed kill using a Leigh light. The pilot of the aircraft, P/O Wiley B. Howell, an American volunteer serving in the RAF, was subsequently awarded the DFC. Howell later returned to serve in the United States Navy, commanding the carrier Bennington in 1965–66.

=== Wolfpacks ===
U-502 took part in one wolfpack, namely:

- Reissewolf (21 – 30 October 1941)

== Summary of raiding history ==
Date	Ship Name	Nationality	Tonnage (GRT)	Fate
7 October 1941	Svend Foyn	United Kingdom	14,795	Damaged
16 February 1942	Monagas	Venezuela	2,650	Sunk
16 February 1942	San Nicholas	United Kingdom	2,391	Sunk
16 February 1942	Tia Juana	United Kingdom	2,395	Sunk
22 February 1942	J.N.Pew	United States	9,033	Sunk
23 February 1942	Sun	United States	9,002	Damaged
23 February 1942	Thalia	Panama	8,329	Sunk
11 May 1942	Cape of Good Hope	United Kingdom	4,963	Sunk
24 May 1942	Gonçalves Dias	Brazil	4,996	Sunk
28 May 1942	Alcoa Pilgrim	United States	6,759	Sunk
3 June 1942	M.F. Ellliot	United States	6,940	Sunk
9 June 1942	Bruxelles	Belgium	5,085	Sunk
9 June 1942	Franklin K. Lane	United States	6,589	Sunk
15 June 1942	Cold Harbor	Panama	5,010	Sunk
15 June 1942	Scottsburg	United States	8,001	Sunk
15 June 1942	West Hardaway	United States	5,702	Sunk

== Bibliography ==
- Busch, Rainer; Röll, Hans-Joachim (1999). German U-boat commanders of World War II : a biographical dictionary. Translated by Brooks, Geoffrey. London, Annapolis, Md: Greenhill Books, Naval Institute Press. ISBN 1-55750-186-6.
- Busch, Rainer; Röll, Hans-Joachim (1999). Deutsche U-Boot-Verluste von September 1939 bis Mai 1945 [German U-boat losses from September 1939 to May 1945]. Der U-Boot-Krieg (in German). Vol. IV. Hamburg, Berlin, Bonn: Mittler. ISBN 3-8132-0514-2.
- Gröner, Erich; Jung, Dieter; Maass, Martin (1991). U-boats and Mine Warfare Vessels. German Warships 1815–1945. Vol. 2. Translated by Thomas, Keith; Magowan, Rachel. London: Conway Maritime Press. ISBN 0-85177-593-4.
- Kemp, Paul (1999). U-Boats Destroyed - German Submarine Losses in the World Wars. London: Arms & Armour. ISBN 1-85409-515-3.
