= Jürgen von Rosenstiel =

- Born: 23 November 1912; Kiel, Schleswig-Holstein, German Empire
- Died: 6 July 1942 (aged 29); U-502, Bay of Biscay, off La Rochelle, German-occupied France
- Military career
- Allegiance: Nazi Germany
- Branch: Reichsmarine; Kriegsmarine
- Service years: 1933–1942
- Rank: Kapitänleutnant
- Commands: U-143; U-502
- Conflicts: Spanish Civil War; World War II
- Awards: Spanish Cross in Silver without Swords, U-boat War Badge 1939, Iron Cross 1st Class

Jürgen von Rosenstiel (23 November 1912 – 6 July 1942) was a German U-boat commander in World War II.

== Naval career ==
Jürgen von Rosenstiel joined the Reichsmarine on 1 April 1933. During his training he sailed on ships such as the Gorch Fock and then the cruiser Karlsruhe (taking part in a 239-day world trip in 1933 and again 55 days in Spanish waters in 1936–1937, where they joined the non-intervention patrols off the Spanish coast during the Spanish Civil War). Lastly he sailed on the school ship Schlesien from October 1938 to March 1939. He then joined the school ship in an official capacity, serving as radio technical officer and a watch officer on the Schlesien from July 1939 to March 1940 when he was then transferred to the U-boat force. From April to August 1940 Rosenstiel went through U-boat training and then joined the 2nd U-boat Flotilla as a supernumerary watch officer until September 1940.

Rosenstiel was Second Watch Officer (2WO) on the U-38 from September to November 1940 and then the boats first Watch Officer (1WO) until February 1941 when he began his U-boat Commander training with the 24th U-boat Flotilla and then with the 22nd U-boat Flotilla. In preparation of taking command of a new boat Rosenstiel went through U-boat familiarization at Deutsche Werft, Hamburg from 17 April 1941. On 31 May 1941 Rosenstiel commissioned the new Type IXC boat U-502 at Hamburg. He spent the next four months in the Baltic training his crew and preparing the boat for combat. On 29 September 1941 he took the boat out on its first of three war patrols. Rosenstiel would be very successful sinking 14 ships (78,843 gross register tons (GRT)) and damaging two more ships (23,797 GRT). He achieved his greatest successes with U-502 in the Caribbean. On the return leg of her third patrol, U-502 was sunk with all hands by a British Wellington bomber in the Bay of Biscay.

== Awards ==
- Spanish Cross in Silver without Swords - 6 June 1939
- Iron Cross 2nd Class - 5 November 1940
- U-boat War Badge 1939 - 22 January 1941
- Iron Cross 1st Class - 17 March 1942

== Bibliography ==
- Busch, Rainer; Röll, Hans-Joachim (1999). German U-boat commanders of World War II : a biographical dictionary. Translated by Brooks, Geoffrey. London, Annapolis, Md: Greenhill Books, Naval Institute Press. ISBN 1-55750-186-6.
