= Barima =

Barima may refer to:

== People ==
- Alex Barima (born 1991), Canadian actor
- Barima Sidney (born 1977), Ghanaian hiplife musician and activist
- Gabriel Barima (born 1953), Ghanaian politician
- Kankam Twum Barima (1918–1998), Ghanaian academic and agriculture minister

== Other ==
- Barima-Waini, a region of Guyana
- Barima Point, a small settlement in Delta Amacuro state, Venezuela
- Barima River, Guyana
- MV Barima, a Guyanese coastal ferry, built 1939 and sank 2026
