= HNLMS Schouten =

History

Netherlands
- Name: Schouten
- Builder: Maatschappij Fijenoord, Rotterdam
- Laid down: 1912
- Commissioned: December 7th 1941
- Out of service: February 28th 1942
- Renamed: Suiten Maru (Under Japanese service 1943-1945)
- Fate: Scuttled by own crew, raised by Japanese forces, torpedoed in 1945

General characteristics
- Type: Anti-air Ship
- Displacement: 1,805 t (1,776 long tons) standard
- Length: 82.37 m (270 ft 3 in)
- Beam: 12.24 m (40 ft 2 in)
- Draught: 5.15 m (16 ft 11 in)
- Installed power: 1,100 hp (820 kW)
- Propulsion: 1 × Triple expansion
- Speed: 10.5 knots (19.4 km/h; 12.1 mph)
- Complement: 26
- Armament: Many anti-air machineguns of different calibers

HNLMS Schouten served as an air-defense ship for the Royal Netherlands Navy during World War II. SS Schouten was originally a passenger ship for the KPM. She was stationed in Surabaya harbor as a training ship in 1941. On 7 December 1941 Schouten was commandeered and militarized by the Royal Netherlands Navy due to the outbreak of war in the Pacific.

== Service history ==
HNLMS Schouten was converted to air defense ship at Surabaya harbor. She was armed with many anti-air machine guns of different calibers. After conversion, she set out for the island of Gili Genteng in the Madura Strait where she was stationed to provide air defense. After the disastrous outcome of the Battle of the Java Sea, she was scuttled by her own crew as she would not be able to safely escape to Australia.

The wreckage was refloated by the Japanese in 1943, repaired and renamed to Suiten Maru. She was sunk by an American bomber attack in 1944, raised and repaired again, and sunk one last time by a torpedo from USS Sea Robin on 3 March 1945.
