= HMAS Toowoomba =

Two ships of the Royal Australian Navy have been named HMAS Toowoomba, after the city of Toowoomba, Queensland.

- HMAS Toowoomba (J157), a Bathurst-class corvette active between 1941 and 1946, before transferring to other navies
- HMAS Toowoomba (FFH 156), an Anzac-class frigate that entered service in 2005

== Battle honours ==
Ships named HMAS Toowoomba are entitled to carry two battle honours:

- Pacific 1942
- Indian Ocean 1942–44
