= HMCS Spikenard =

Flower-class corvette

Coordinates: 50°10′N 21°07′W

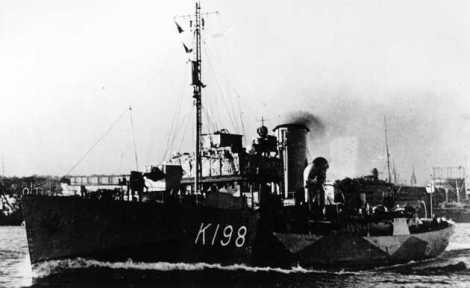
- HMCS Spikenard

History

United Kingdom
- Name: Spikenard
- Namesake: Spikenard flower
- Ordered: 22 January 1940
- Builder: Davie Shipbuilding, Lauzon
- Laid down: 24 February 1940
- Launched: 10 August 1940
- Commissioned: 6 December 1940
- Out of service: 15 May 1941 – loaned to Canada
- Identification: Pennant number: K198
- Fate: Loaned to Canada 1941; sunk 1942

Canada
- Name: Spikenard
- Acquired: Loaned from United Kingdom
- Commissioned: 15 May 1941
- Identification: Pennant number: K198
- Honours and awards: Atlantic 1941–42
- Fate: Sunk 10 February 1942

General characteristics
- Class & type: Flower-class corvette
- Displacement: 950 long tons (970 t; 1,060 short tons)
- Length: 205 ft (62.48 m)
- Beam: 33 ft (10.06 m)
- Draught: 11.5 ft (3.51 m)
- Propulsion: Single shaft; 2 water tube boilers; 1 4-cyl. triple expansion steam engine, 2,750 hp (2,050 kW)
- Speed: 16 knots (29.6 km/h)
- Range: 3,450 nmi (6,390 km; 3,970 mi) at 12 kn (22 km/h; 14 mph)
- Complement: 6 officers, 79 enlisted
- Sensors & processing systems: Radar – SW1C or 2C (later); Sonar – Type 123A, later Type 127DV
- Armament: 1 × BL 4 in (102 mm) Mk.IX single gun; 2 .50 cal machine gun twin; 2 Lewis .303 cal mg twin; 2 Mk.II depth charge throwers; 2 Depth charge rails with 40 depth charges.; Originally fitted with minesweeping gear, later removed.

HMCS Spikenard was a Flower-class corvette that served with the Royal Canadian Navy during the Second World War. She served primarily in the Battle of the Atlantic as a convoy escort. She was named for the Spikenard flower.

== Background ==
Flower-class corvettes like Spikenard serving with the Royal Canadian Navy during the Second World War were different from earlier and more traditional sail-driven corvettes. The "corvette" designation was created by the French as a class of small warships; the Royal Navy borrowed the term for a period but discontinued its use in 1877. During the hurried preparations for war in the late 1930s, Winston Churchill reactivated the corvette class, needing a name for smaller ships used in an escort capacity, in this case based on a whaling ship design. The generic name "flower" was used to designate the class of these ships, which – in the Royal Navy – were named after flowering plants.

== Construction ==
She was originally ordered on 22 January 1940 by the Royal Navy as part of the 1939-1940 Flower-class program as HMS Spikenard (K198). Spikenard was laid down 24 February 1940 and launched later that year on 10 August. She was commissioned on 6 December 1940 in Quebec City, Quebec. On 15 May 1941 she was one of ten corvettes loaned to the Royal Canadian Navy. She could be told apart from other Canadian Flowers by her lack of minesweeping gear and the siting of the after gun tub amidships.

== War service ==
=== Royal Navy ===
On 21 January 1941 she sailed with convoy HX 104 to get her final equipment at South Shields, Tyne in the United Kingdom. She was worked up at Tobermory and left on 10 June with convoy OB 332 as a full escort.

=== Royal Canadian Navy ===
After commissioning in the RCN she was assigned as part of the Newfoundland Escort Force (NEF). From July 1941 to January 1942 Spikenard made three round-trips to the Mid-Ocean Meeting Point off Iceland escorting the vital trans-Atlantic convoys. On opening night (27 January 1942), Spikenard's commander, Lt-Cdr. H.F. Shadforth, hammered a six-inch spike into the floor of the Seagoing Officers Club, "The Crows' Nest" in St. John's, Newfoundland (better known as "Newfyjohn" during the War). After Spikenard was torpedoed and sunk two weeks later with the loss of all except eight of her crew, fellow NEF officers preserved the nail as "'Spikenard' his Spike". It still remains on display and the members of the Club hold a "Corvette Wake" commemorative dinner every year to remember Spikenard and her crew.

=== Sinking ===
On the night of 10 February 1942, Spikenard was torpedoed by U-136 while escorting convoy SC 67. The torpedo struck Spikenard at virtually the same instant as another torpedo exploded against a nearby Norwegian tanker, M/S Heina. In the confusion of battle, the other escorts in the group believed that only the now blazing and illuminated tanker had been struck, and rescued her entire crew. Spikenard was not on fire and the other escorts did not realize she was hit and sinking. The other escorts in the group had been caught up chasing contacts and did not realize that Spikenard was gone until she failed to answer repeated radio calls. Some escorts fell back and found only eight survivors. Spikenard's Commanding Officer had been the senior officer of the escort group.
