= Bernadou =

Bernadou is a French surname and may refer to:

- John Baptiste Bernadou (1858–1908), an officer in the United States Navy during the Spanish–American War
- Victor-Félix Bernadou (1816–1891), a French cardinal
- USS Bernadou (DD-153), a Wickes-class destroyer in the United States Navy during World War II
