= MS Sama (1936) =

History
- Name: Sama
- Owner: Chr. Gundersen & Co.
- Port of registry: Oslo
- Builder: Lindholmens varv, Gothenburg
- Launched: 19 December 1936
- Completed: April 1937
- Fate: Sunk on 22 February 1942

General characteristics
- Type: Cargo ship
- Tonnage: 1,799 GRT

MS Sama was a Norwegian motor merchant ship that was torpedoed and sunk by a German submarine during World War II.

The 1,799-gross register ton, 2,200 tons deadweight (DWT) Sama was launched at Lindholmens in Gothenburg, Sweden, on 19 December 1936 and completed in April 1937. She was built for the Oslo-based Norwegian shipping company Chr. Gundersen & Co.

In 1941, Sama played a significant role in the rescue of survivors from the badly damaged British troopship Staffordshire. Sama rescued 234 survivors and arrived at Stornoway of the Hebrides Islands on 29 March 1941.

On 15 February 1942, she sailed as part of the trade convoy ON 67 from Belfast, Northern Ireland on a westbound course across the Atlantic Ocean for St. John's, Canada. She was carrying 1,040 tons of china clay when the convoy was attacked by German submarines just after midnight on 22 February. At 2:25 AM, Sama was hit in the stern by a torpedo from the German submarine U-155 under the command of Kapitänleutnant Adolf Piening. The ship sank within minutes of the attack.

Of her crew and passengers, 19 perished and 20 were saved by the American destroyer USS Nicholson. A maritime inquiry was held in Halifax, Nova Scotia, Canada on 7 March 1942. A Norwegian copy of the inquiry brief currently exists.
