= Convoy ON 67 =

Convoy during naval battles of the Second World War

- Part of Battle of the Atlantic
- Relief location map of the North Atlantic Ocean
Date	21–25 February 1942
Location	North Atlantic
Result	German victory

Belligerents
United States; Canada	Germany

Commanders and leaders
(United States) Albert C. Murdaugh	Admiral Karl Dönitz

Strength
39 freighters; 4 destroyers; 1 corvette; 1 cutter	3 submarines

Casualties and losses
8 freighters sunk (54,750 GRT); 163 killed	

Convoy ON 67 was a trade convoy of merchant ships that sailed during the Second World War. It was the 67th of the numbered series of ON convoys Outbound from the British Isles to North America. The ships departed from Liverpool on 14 February 1942 with the convoy rescue ship Toward (1923, 1,571 GRT) and were escorted to the Mid-Ocean Meeting Point by Escort Group B4.

== Escort Group A6 (Task Unit TU 4.1.5) ==
On 19 February Escort Group A6 (the US naval task unit TU 4.1.5) comprising Gleaves-class destroyers USS Edison and Nicholson, Wickes-class destroyers USS Lea and Bernadou and the Canadian Flower-class corvette HMCS Algoma took over the escort from Escort Group B4. Edison's commanding officer, Commander Albert C. Murdaugh, USN, was the senior officer of the escort group. The escort group was conducting its first operation. Bernadou had been modified for long range escort work by replacing the fourth boiler and stack with an extra fuel tank.

Nicholson had the only functional radar, though the merchant ship Toward could provide support with its High-frequency direction finding (HF/DF, Huff-Duff) set. Lea carried a British ASV aircraft radar with fixed antennae, but salt water spray kept shoring the coaxial cable. Edison had no depth charge throwers, and was limited to a linear pattern rolled off the stern. The US ships did not have enough binoculars. Bernadou had a 7×50 pair for the officer of the deck and a 6×30 pair for the junior officer of the deck but there were none for the lookouts. The escort was reinforced on 26 February by the Treasury-class cutter USCGC Spencer.

== U-155 ==
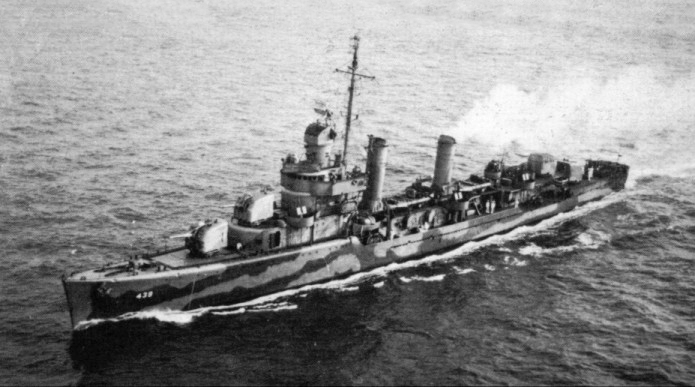
Task Unit 4.1.5 commander's ship USS Edison.

U-155 reported the convoy on 21 February. Toward obtained a bearing on the contact report, and Lea searched the bearing unsuccessfully at dusk. U-155 approached the port quarter of the convoy in the pre-dawn hours of 22 February, torpedoed the British tanker Adellen, the Norwegian freighter Sama and both ships sank quickly. Algoma rescued eleven of Adellen's crew of 31 while Nicholson and Toward found 20 survivors from Sama's crew of 50. U-155 crash-dived to avoid Bernadou but the U-boat was not spotted. U-155 made another emergency dive while shadowing the convoy at 10:42 but Edison did not detect the U-boat. U-587, U-69 and U-558 found the convoy on 23 February.

== U-558 ==
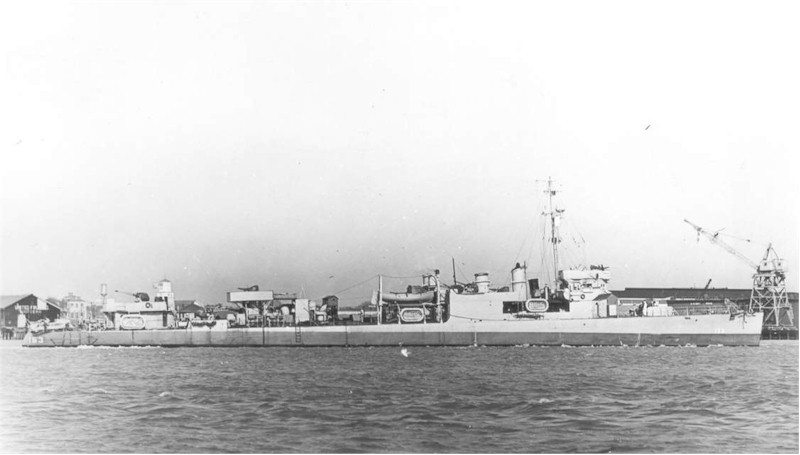
USS Bernadou

U-558 approached the convoy at 21:20, but repeatedly turned away to avoid Bernadou's patrols until a squall provided cover at midnight. U-558 torpedoed the Norwegian tanker Inverarder at 00:45 on 24 February. The tanker sank slowly and Toward rescued all 42 of the crew. U-558 approached again at 02:30 and fired a single torpedo at Edison. The torpedo missed, and Edison was unaware it had been fired at. U-558 torpedoed the Norwegian tanker Eidanger at 02:55. U-558 reloaded and at 05:50 torpedoed the British tankers Anadara, Finnanger, and the British freighter White Crest. All three ships straggled and were sunk. Later that morning, the convoy commodore sent a signal to the escort commander regarding the performance of U-558: "That chap must be one of their best ones. I do hope you have done him in".

== U-158 ==
U-158 found the convoy at 04:25 hrs on 24 February and torpedoed the British tanker Empire Celt. Empire Celt was using the Admiralty Net Defence system, streaming a strong steel net from 50 ft (15 m) booms along either side of the ship. One torpedo broke through the net and hit amidships. Empire Celt later broke in half, but a tug from Newfoundland rescued 31 from the crew of 37.

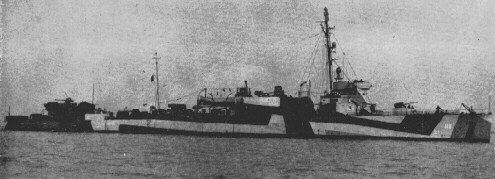
USS Lea

As U-558 was torpedoing ships on the starboard side of the convoy, U-158 approached the port side and hit the British tanker Diloma at 06:35. Diloma was the only one of the torpedoed ships to reach Halifax. U-158 and U-558 dived to avoid being seen in the early daylight. U-558 found and sank the Eidanger, drifting and abandoned astern of the convoy, with gunfire and a torpedo. All of Eidangers crew had been rescued. Lea investigated a DF bearing from Toward at 15:15 and spotted U-558 20 nmi (37 km; 23 mi) astern of the convoy at 17:07. Lea dropped eight depth charges at 17:46, surprised the U-boat on the surface at 18:13 and dropped 14 depth charges at 18:47 but U-558 was undamaged.

Nicholson investigated a DF bearing from Toward and sighted U-158 at 13:23. U-158 dived and evaded Nicholson that slowed to listen. U-158 surfaced at 15:50 and was surprised to find Nicholson waiting 4,900 ft (1,500 m) away. U-158 crashed-dived before Nicholson saw the U-boat. U-158 surfaced again at 18:17 and was surprised to find Edison 2,000 yd (1,800 m) away. U-158 again avoided detection by crash-diving. Edison spotted U-158 making another convoy approach at 20:08 and dropped 25 depth charges over the following six hours. U-158 was undamaged but had been prevented from making further attacks on the convoy. Admiral Karl Dönitz, BdU (commander in chief of U-Boats) ordered his U-boats to discontinue the attack on 25 February. The remainder of the convoy reached Halifax on 1 March 1942.

== Aftermath ==
=== Analysis ===
In 1997, Clay Blair wrote that Murdaugh was awarded a medal for "particularly outstanding" conduct in the defence of the convoy. Blair called the defence a disaster and an embarrassment for the US Navy. Eight British ships (including six tankers) of about 55,000 GRT had been sunk and another tanker damaged. Dönitz wrote that the results were "particularly satisfactory", given the number of inexperienced U-boat captains involved. Dönitz judged that pack attacks could be resumed when there were sufficient U-boats to find convoys, shadow them and attack en masse. Reports of the anti-torpedo nets on Empire Celt caused consternation that a ship streaming nets could achieve 9–10 kn (17–19 km/h; 10–12 mph) and demanded that a new magnetic pistol, to explode torpedoes under a ship be prepared. A new design was being tested but the scientists wanted the new exploder to be perfect, given the draconian punishments meted out to the inventors of the first type. In 2004, David Woodman wrote that the losses suffered by the convoy was an embarrassment to the US Navy and the seven hours it took the naval headquarters in Washington (seven hours) to agree a course change requested by Murdaugh was clearly inadequate and the staff of the Commander-in-Chief agreed after the convoy that discretion should be delegated to the escort commander. The usefulness of radar and Huff-Duff was demonstrated and the need for a procedure for depth-charge attacks and more training in exploiting Asdic contacts was accepted.

=== Casualties ===
The convoy suffered the loss of 123 merchant sailors.

== Ships in convoy ==
=== Allied merchant ships ===
Merchant ships convoyed
Name	Year	Flag	GRT	Notes
MV Adellen	1930	United Kingdom	7,984	Sunk 22 Feb, U-155, 36† 12 surv. 49°30′N, 38°15′W
MV Anadara	1935	United Kingdom	8,009	Sunk 26 Feb, U-558, U-587 62† 0 surv. 43°45′N, 42°15′W
Belinda	1939	Norway	8,325	Destination West Indies
Consuelo	1937	United Kingdom	4,847	Destination New York City
Cristales	1926	United Kingdom	5,389	Vice-commodore R H R MacKay embarked; collided 24 Feb
Daghestan	1941	United Kingdom	7,248	CAM ship
Dekabrist	1903	Soviet Union	7,363	
Diloma	1939	United Kingdom	8,146	Damaged, U-158, made Halifax
Dolabella	1939	United Kingdom	8,142	Destination Curaçao
Dromus	1938	United Kingdom	8,036	Destination Curaçao
MV Eidanger	1938	Norway	9,432	Sunk 24 Feb, U-587, U-558 0† 39 surv. 44°11′N, 43°25′W
Empire Celt	1941	United Kingdom	8,032	Sunk 24 Feb, U-158 6† 43°50′N, 43°38′W
Empire Druid	1941	United Kingdom	9,813	Destination Port Arthur
Empire	1941	United Kingdom	8,134	Destination Baton Rouge
Empire Spray	1941	United Kingdom	7,242	CAM ship; destination Halifax
Empire Steel	1941	United Kingdom	8,138	Destination Port Arthur
MV Finnanger	1928	Norway	9,551	Sunk 24 Feb, U-558 39† 0 surv. 43°45′N, 42°15′W
Glittre	1928	Norway	6,409	Destination Aruba
Gloucester City	1919	United Kingdom	3,071	Destination Philadelphia
Hamlet	1934	Norway	6,578	Joined from Iceland 19 Feb
Hektoria	1899	United Kingdom	13,797	Destination New York City
Idefjord	1921	Norway	4,287	Destination Saint John, New Brunswick
SS Inverarder	1919	Norway	5,578	Sunk 24 Feb, U-558 0† 42 surv. 44°34′N, 42°37′W
Lancastrian Prince	1940	United Kingdom	1,914	Destination New York City
Manchester Exporter	1918	United Kingdom	5,277	Convoy Commodore Rear Admiral O. H. Dawson embarked
Mentor	1914	United Kingdom	7,383	Destination Singapore
USS Mizar	1932	United States Navy	6,982	US Navy stores ship, ex-Iceland 19 Feb
Nueva Andalucia	1940	Norway	10,044	Destination Port Arthur
Orari	1931	United Kingdom	10,350	Destination Trinidad
USS Pleiades	1939	United States Navy	3,600	US Navy, ex-Iceland 19 Feb
Rapana	1935	United Kingdom	8,017	Destination Curaçao
Sama	1936	Norway	1,799	Sunk 22 Feb, U-155 20† 18 surv. 49°30′N, 38°30′W
Skandinavia	1940	Norway	10,044	Destination Aruba
Strinda	1937	Norway	10,973	Destination Key West
Stuart Prince	1940	United Kingdom	1,911	Destination Halifax
Thorhild	1935	Norway	10,316	Destination Curaçao
Torr Head	1937	United Kingdom	5,021	Destination Norfolk, Virginia
SS Toward	1923	United Kingdom	1,571	convoy rescue ship Captain Arthur Knell, Huff-Duff embarked
SS White Crest	1928	United Kingdom	4,365	Straggled 19 Feb; sunk 24 Feb, U-558 47† 0 surv. 43°45′N, 42°15′W

=== Convoy escorts ===
Escort Group A6 (TU 4.1.5)
Name	Flag	Type	Notes
HMCS Algoma	Royal Canadian Navy	Flower-class corvette	19 February – 1 March 1942
USS Edison	United States Navy	Gleaves-class destroyer	19 February – 1 March 1942
USS Nicholson	United States Navy	Gleaves-class destroyer	19 February – 1 March 1942
USCGC Spencer	United States Navy	Treasury-class cutter	26 February – 1 March 1942
USS Bernadou	United States Navy	Wickes-class destroyer	19 February – 1 March 1942
USS Lea	United States Navy	Wickes-class destroyer	19 February – 1 March 1942

== U-boats ==
U-boats sent towards Convoy ON 67
Name	Flag	Class	Notes
U-155	Kriegsmarine	Type IXC submarine	Sank MV Adellen, SS Sama
U-158	Kriegsmarine	Type IXC submarine	Sank Empire Celt, damaged Diloma
U-162	Kriegsmarine	Type IXC submarine	
U-558	Kriegsmarine	Type VIIC submarine	
U-587	Kriegsmarine	Type VIIC submarine	Sank MV Eidanger
U-588	Kriegsmarine	Type VIIC submarine	

== See also ==
- Convoy Battles of World War II
