= SS Haukefjell =

Two steamships operated by Olsen & Ugelstad, Oslo, were named Haukefjell.

- SS Haukefjell (1921), requisitioned by Germany in 1940, bombed at Hamburg on 24 February 1945.
- SS Haukefjell (1941), in service from 1946, re-engined in 1949 and sold in 1952.
