= First Battle of Cárdenas =

Coordinates: 23°2′7.82″N 81°12′27.01″W

- Part of the Spanish–American War
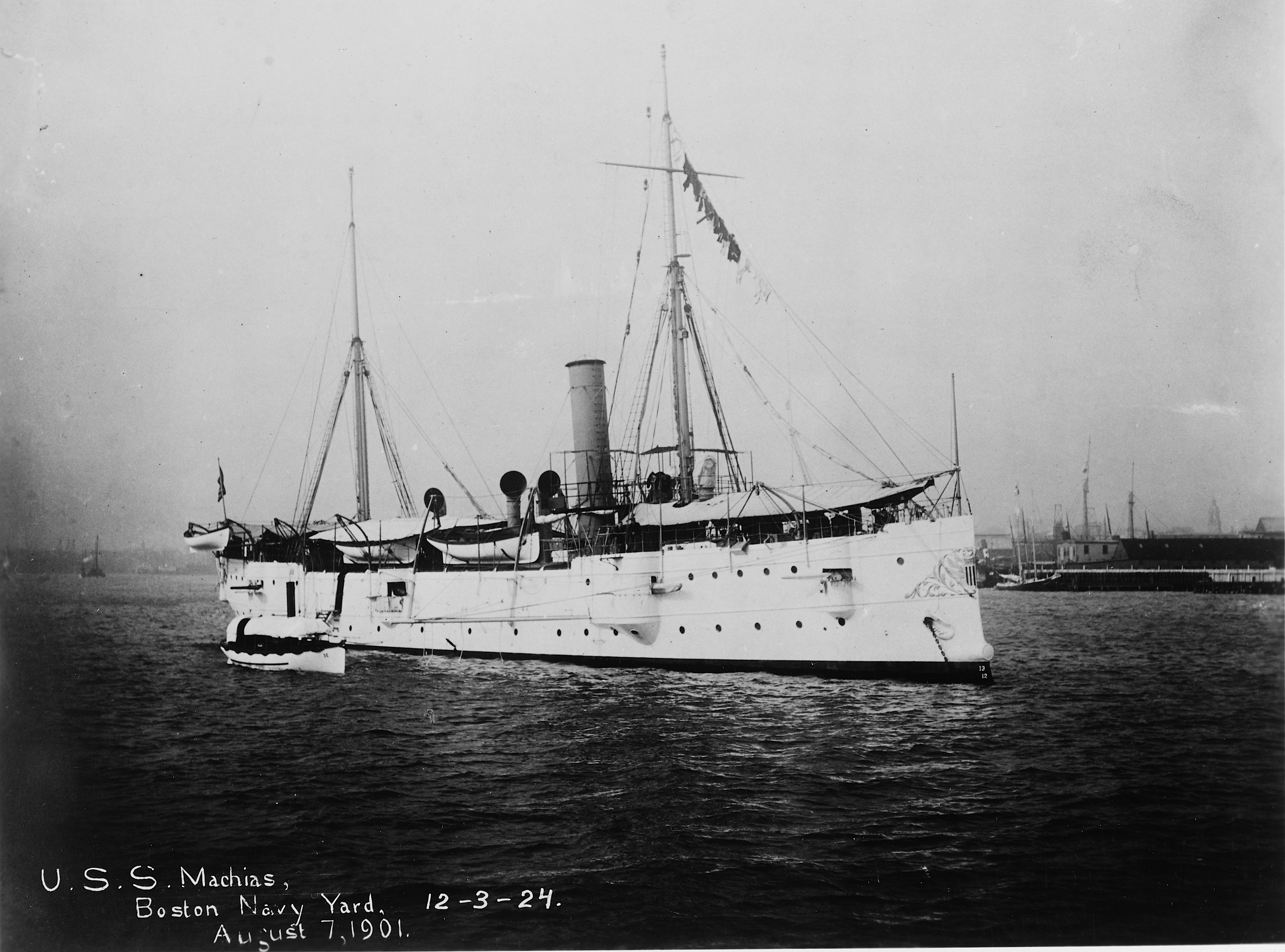
- USS Machias, circa 7 August 1901
Date	May 8, 1898
Location	Off Cárdenas, Caribbean Sea
Result	American victory

Belligerents
United States	Spain

Commanders and leaders
John Bernadou	(Spain) Antonio Rendón

Strength
1 gunboat 1 torpedo boat	2 gunboats 1 armed tug

Casualties and losses
None	2 gunboats damaged 1 armed tug damaged

The First Battle of Cárdenas was a naval action fought in May 1898 during the Spanish–American War. A force of three Spanish vessels attempted to lift the blockade of Cárdenas but were repulsed and sent back into harbor by two United States Navy warships.

== Background ==
During the Spanish–American War, Cardenas proved to be one of Spain's strongholds though it was considered a minor port. When war was declared and the United States Navy began their blockade of Cuba, three Spanish vessels were trapped within the river. These vessels skirmished with two American vessels on April 27 and in the brief action one of the Spanish vessels was damaged. At the beginning of May 1898, the small 142 ton torpedo boat USS Winslow, under Lieutenant John Bernadou, and gunboat USS Machias, circa 1898. blockaded Cardenas. On May 8, USS Machias left the blockade for a patrol, leaving the Winslow as the only American vessel at Cardenas. This tempted the Spanish gunboats to try to break the blockade. USS Winslow was armed with three rapid fire 1-pounders and three 18-inch (457 mm) torpedo tubes with a crew of twenty officers and men. Machias was a much larger gunboat armed with eight 4-inch guns, four 6-pounders and four 1-pounders. Machias had a crew of about 150 men and officers. She participated only in the last few minutes of fighting.

Spanish forces included the Antonio Lopez, the Alerta and the Ligeria. All armed with one rapid fire 6-pounder each and had a crew on average of twenty men. The Spanish garrison of Cardenas manned two shore batteries, one was a stone battery occupied by a few guns and gunners, the other was filled with at least three field pieces and about 100 infantry with long range rifles but neither of these forces were capable of engaging as the battle was fought outside of their range. American forces also suspected that the Spanish had laid a sea mine field around the harbor with only one avenue for entering or exiting the port. A buoy was placed beyond the mine field which marked the extent at which the Spanish gunboats could fire. Spanish naval forces were under the command of Lieutenant Antonio Pérez Rendón.

== Battle ==
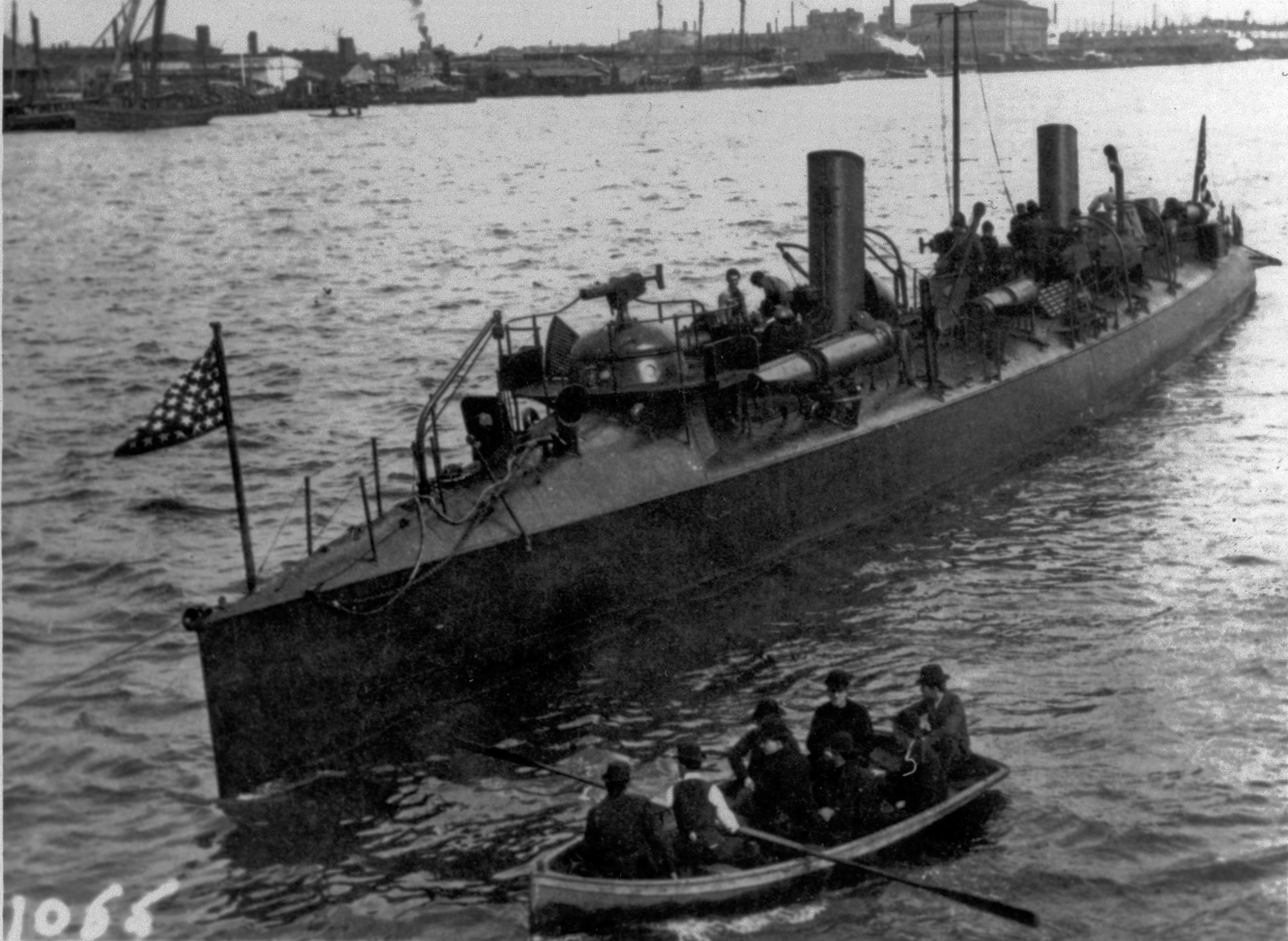
USS Winslow

When the Machias set sail east for her patrol, a few hours later the Winslow sighted a lot of activity in the Spanish port so Bardanou steered his ship towards Cardenas. Seeing the Winslow all alone, the three Spanish gunboats sortied and headed towards the American ship. Lieutenant Rendon signaled his men and they opened fire with their three guns combined as the Winslow passed the buoy from a distance of about a mile. Instead of fleeing as suspected by the Spaniards, Lieutenant John Bernadou turned his ship right in the direction of the attacking squadron and opened fire with Winslow's two bow guns. These rapid fire 1-pounders worked extremely well according to reports, shot after shot was lined up and struck the Spanish ships which were positioned close together. A duel continued for several minutes more until Winslow came to a closer range, Lieutenant Bernadou managed to maneuver his ship so that his two bow guns were firing and hitting all three Spanish vessels at the same time. After about forty minutes of combat the three gunboats scattered and made for port.

The American gunners continued firing and during the retreat gunboat Antonio Lopez was struck well just as they neared their safety zone under the batteries. The shot entered the aft section of the hull and exploded within the vessel. Antonio Lopez came to a stop and was disabled but continued firing with her 6-pounders. One of the other gunboats came to her rescue and attached a tow cable to the Antonio Lopez and began pulling her to safety. Having heard the sound of gunfire, the Machias turned around and headed back for Cardenas and arrived just as the fight was coming to an end. At a two-mile distance Machias opened fire with her 4-inchers. Two shots were fired but neither hit, however the Spanish ceased firing and focused on their escape. Entering the safe avenue through the suspected mine field, the Americans could not follow the three gunboats. It was later discovered on May 11, that either there were no sea mines at Cardenas or the United States Navy forces simply couldn't locate them.

== Aftermath ==
The shore batteries never engaged as the Americans did not come within their effective range. USS Winslow was not struck at all during the battle due to her commander which constantly kept the ship at a fast pace, also, the sea was rough that day so most of their fire was reportedly wild because their ships rolled back and forth too much. Spanish casualties are unknown though the three gunboats took damage, one of them apparently crippling. Over seventy-five shells were fired by American forces in an engagement that lasted just about fifty minutes. In reports of the battle, Lieutenant Bernadou is credited for his bravery in attacking a superior enemy force though his victory was overshadowed a few days later on May 11, 1898 when the more major Second Battle of Cardenas was fought. Again Bernadou was recognized for bravery in battle and was commended and promoted.

== Order of battle ==
United States

Gunboat

- USS Machias

Torpedo boat

- USS Winslow

Spain

Gunboats

- Ligera
- Alerta

Armed tug

- Antonio López
