= SS Empire Celt =

British tanker

History
- Name: Empire Celt (1941-44)
- Owner: Ministry of War Transport
- Operator: Jas German & Co Ltd
- Port of registry: (United Kingdom) Middlesbrough
- Builder: Furness Shipbuilding Company
- Launched: 7 October 1941
- Completed: December 1941
- Identification: Code Letters BCWD; United Kingdom Official Number 164861
- Fate: Sunk 24 February 1942

General characteristics
- Class & type: Tanker
- Tonnage: 8,032 GRT; 4,664 NRT
- Length: 468 ft 5 in (142.77 m)
- Beam: 61 ft 2 in (18.64 m)
- Draught: 33 ft 0 in (10.06 m)
- Installed power: Triple expansion steam engine
- Propulsion: Screw propeller
- Crew: 53 (including DEMS gunners)

Location of the torpedoing of Empire Celt.

Empire Celt was an 8,032 GRT tanker which was built in 1941 for the Ministry of War Transport (MoWT). Completed in January 1942, she had a short career, being torpedoed and sunk on 24 February 1942 by U-158.

== Description ==
Empire Celt was built by Furness Shipbuilding Ltd, Haverton Hill-on-Tees, as yard number 335. She was launched on 7 October 1941 and completed in December.

Empire Celt was 468 feet 5 inches (142.77 m) long, with a beam of 61 feet 2 inches (18.64 m) and a depth of 33 feet 0 inches (10.06 m). She had a GRT of 8,032 and a NRT of 4,664.

Empire Celt was propelled by a triple expansion steam engine, which had cylinders of 27 inches (69 cm), 44 inches (110 cm) and 76 inches (190 cm) diameter by 51 inches (130 cm) stroke. The engine was built by Richardsons, Westgarth & Co Ltd, Hartlepool.

== History ==
Empire Celt was placed under the management of Jas. German & Co Ltd, Middlesbrough. Her port of registry was Middlesbrough. The United Kingdom Official Number 164861 and Code Letters BCWD were allocated.

Empire Celt was a member of Convoy ON 67, which departed Milford Haven, Pembrokeshire on 13 February 1942 bound for North America. Empire Celt was on a voyage from Greenock to New York. She was in ballast. At 08:55 (German time) on 24 February, Empire Celt was torpedoed by U-158, being hit by two torpedoes. Four crew and two DEMS gunners were killed. Although she had been damaged, Empire Celt continued her voyage. Another attack at 09:50 by U-558 failed, with the torpedo aimed at Empire Celt hitting Eidanger instead. Empire Celt later broke in two, with the bow section sinking. The Canadian ship Citadelle rescued 23 survivors, and HMS St Zeno rescued 22 survivors. They were landed at St. John's, Newfoundland on 22 February. The stern section was considered salvageable, and the tug Foundation Franklin was despatched on 9 March to assist but failed to find any trace of Empire Celt and she was presumed to have sunk at position 43°50′N 43°38′W. Those lost on Empire Celt are commemorated at the Tower Hill Memorial, London.
