= USCGC Spencer (WPG-36) =

Treasury-class cutter of the United States Coast Guard

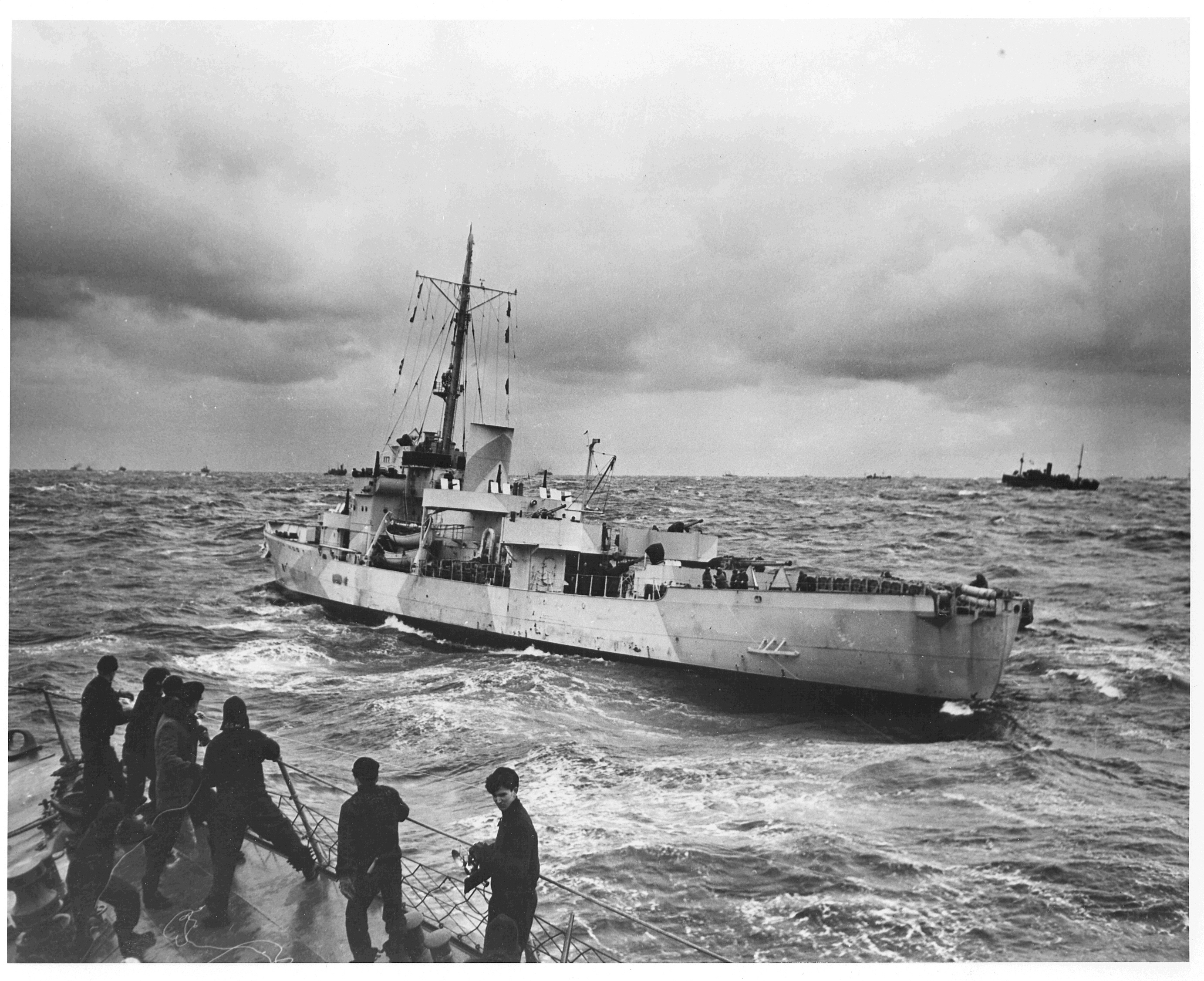
- USCGC Spencer during World War II

History

United States
- Name: USCGC Spencer
- Builder: New York Navy Yard
- Laid down: 11 September 1935
- Launched: 6 January 1937
- Commissioned: 1 March 1937
- Decommissioned: 23 January 1974
- Fate: Sold for scrapping on 8 October 1981 to North American Smelting Co.

General characteristics
- Class & type: Treasury-class cutter
- Displacement: 2,216 long tons (2,252 t)
- Length: 327 ft (99.67 m)o/a
- Beam: 41 ft (12.50 m)
- Draught: 12.5 ft (3.81 m)
- Propulsion: 2 oil-fueled Babcock & Wilcox boilers; 2 shafts; Westinghouse geared turbines; 6,200 ihp (4,600 kW)
- Speed: 20.5 knots (38.0 km/h)
- Range: 12,300 nautical miles (22,780 km) at 11 knots (20.4 km/h)
- Capacity: 135,180 US gallons (511,712 L)
- Complement: 1937: 12 officers, 4 warrants, 107 enlisted; 1941: 16 officers, 5 warrants, 202 enlisted; 1966: 10 officers, 3 warrants, 134 enlisted
- Sensors & processing systems: 1940s: HF/DF: DAR (converted British FH3); Radar: SC-4, SGa; Fire Control Radar: Mk-26; Sonar: QC series; 1960s: Radar: AN/SPS-29D; AN/SPA-52; Fire Control Radar: Mk-26 MOD 4; Sonar: AN/SQS-11
- Armament: 1936: 3 × 5 in (130 mm)/51 cal; 2 × 6-pounders; 1 × 1-pounder; 1941: 3 × 5"/51 cal; 3 × 3 in (76 mm)/50 cal; 4 × 50cal M2 Browning; 2 × depth charge racks; 1 × "Y" gun depth charge projector; 1943: 2 × 5"/51 cal; 4 × 3"/50 cal; 2 × 20 mm Oerlikon/80cal; 1 × Hedgehog; 6 × "K" gun depth charge projectors; 2 × depth charge racks; 1945: 2 × 5"/38 cal; 3 × 40 mm/60 cal (twin mount); 4 × 20 mm/80 cal; 1946: 1 × 5"/38 cal; 1 × 40 mm/60 cal (twin mount); 2 × 20 mm/80 cal; 1 × Hedgehog; 1966: 1 × 5 in (130 mm)/38 Mk30 MOD75; 1 × Mk52 MOD3 Director; 1 × Mk10-1 Hedgehog; 2 (P&S) × Mk32 MOD5TT; 4 × MK44 MOD1 torpedoes; 2 × .50 cal MK2 Browning MG; 2 × MK13 high-altitude parachute flare mortars
- Aircraft carried: 1 Grumman JF-2 Duck or Curtiss SOC-4

USCGC Spencer (WPG-36) was a Treasury-class cutter of the United States Coast Guard that served between 1937 and 1974, seeing action during World War II. She was named for U.S. Treasury Secretary John Canfield Spencer.

== Early career ==
Commissioned in 1937, she was first used as a search and rescue unit off Alaska's fishing grounds.

== World War II ==
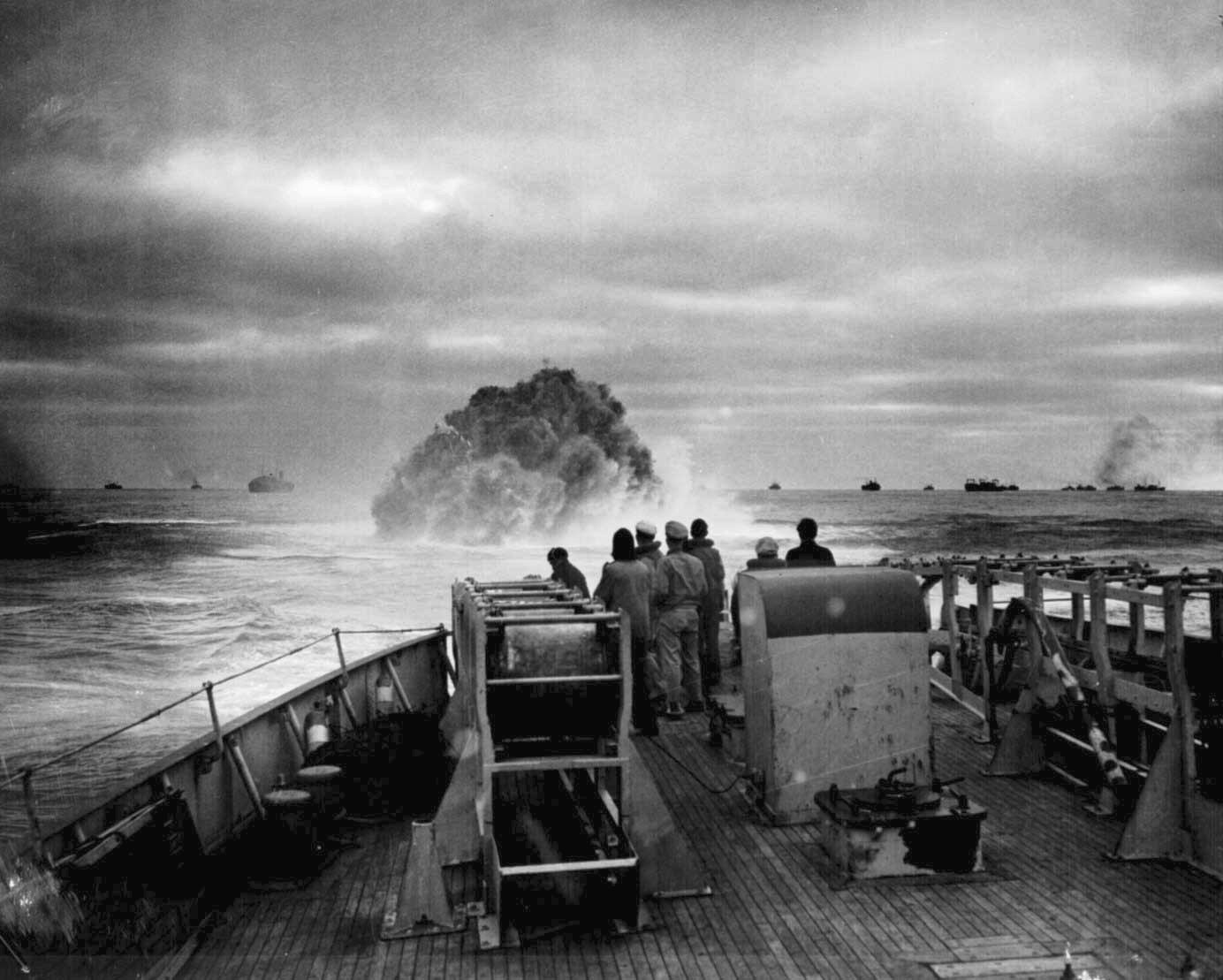
A view from USCGC Spencer depth-charging U-175

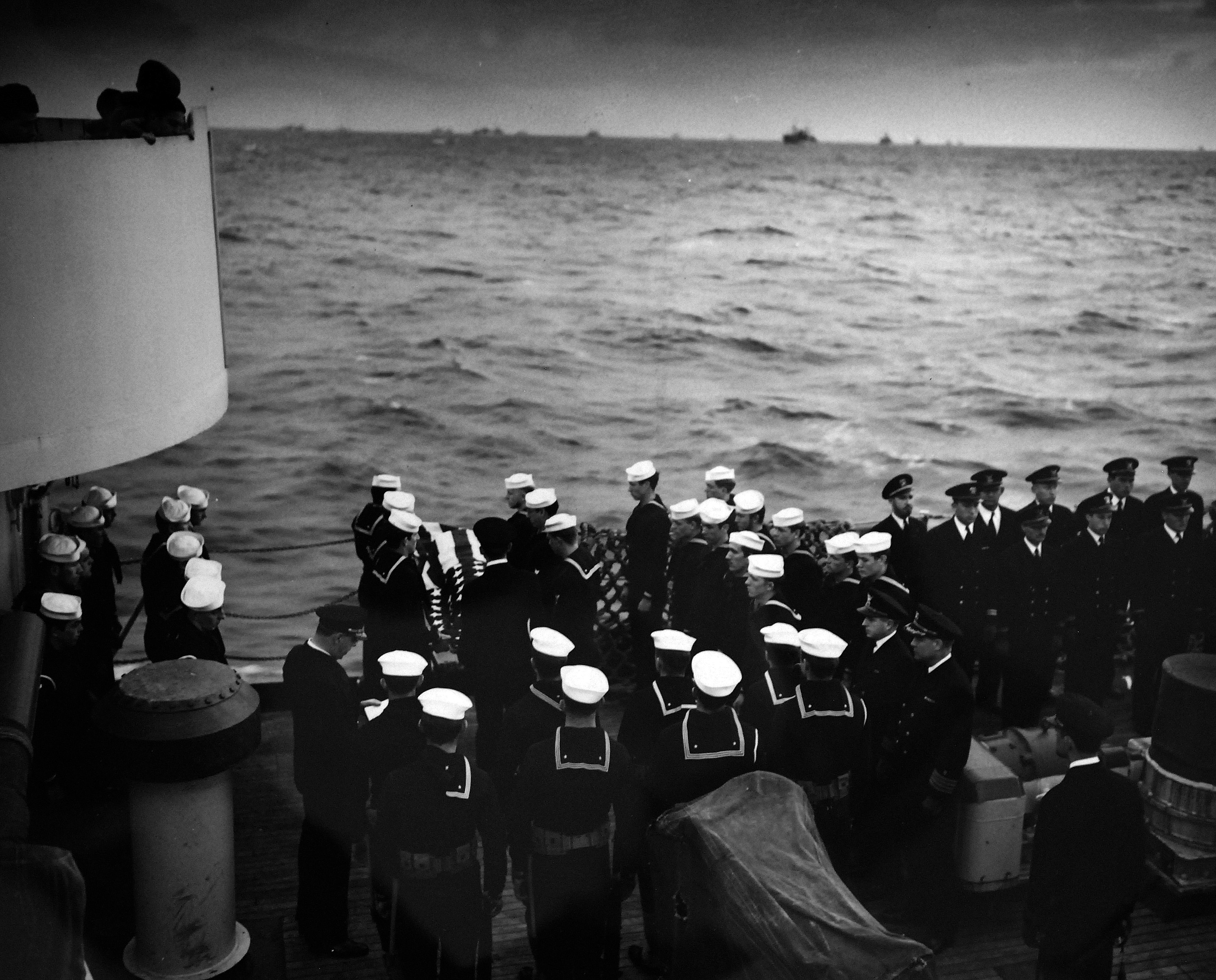
Burial at sea ceremony aboard Spencer during World War II

When the United States entered World War II, the Coast Guard temporarily became part of the United States Navy. Spencer saw service in both the Atlantic and Pacific. During the Battle of the Atlantic she acted as a convoy escort and was responsible for sinking U-633 and U-175 in 1943. She was assigned to the US Navy's Seventh Fleet, in the Pacific War in late 1944, where she served as a Communications Command Ship. There she was credited with taking part in numerous amphibious assaults including Luzon and Palawan in the Philippines Campaign.

=== Convoys escorted ===
Convoy	Escort Group	Dates	Notes
ON 67		26-28 Feb 1942	from Iceland to Newfoundland
HX 178	MOEF group A3	6–16 March 1942	from Newfoundland to Iceland
ON 79		24–31 March 1942	Iceland shuttle
HX 185	MOEF group A3	18–26 April 1942	from Newfoundland to Northern Ireland
ON 92	MOEF group A3	7–18 May 1942	from Northern Ireland to Newfoundland
HX 196	MOEF group A3	2–10 July 1942	from Newfoundland to Northern Ireland
ON 114	MOEF group A3	20–30 July 1942	from Northern Ireland to Newfoundland
SC 95	MOEF group A3	8-18 Aug 1942	from Newfoundland to Northern Ireland
ON 125	MOEF group A3	29 Aug-7 Sept 1942	from Northern Ireland to Newfoundland
SC 100	MOEF group A3	16-27 Sept 1942	from Newfoundland to Northern Ireland
ON 135	MOEF group A3	3-14 Oct 1942	from Northern Ireland to Newfoundland
SC 111	MOEF group A3	1-16 Dec 1942	from Newfoundland to Northern Ireland
ON 156	MOEF group A3	24 Dec 1942-8 Jan 1943	from Northern Ireland to Newfoundland
HX 223	MOEF group A3	19-late Jan 1943	from Newfoundland to Northern Ireland
ON 166	MOEF group A3	12-25 Feb 1943	from Northern Ireland to Newfoundland
SC 121	MOEF group A3	3–12 March 1943	from Northern Ireland to Newfoundland
ON 175	MOEF group A3	25 March-7 April 1943	from Northern Ireland to Newfoundland
HX 233	MOEF group A3	12–20 April 1943	from Newfoundland to Northern Ireland

== Post-war career ==
After the war, Spencer returned to her Coast Guard duties, serving in the Atlantic Ocean. Here she provided navigational assistance for the fledgling trans-Atlantic air industry and acted as a search and rescue platform for both ships and aeroplanes.

She returned to combat duty off the Vietnam coast in February 1969. For ten months, she carried out surveillance to prevent North Vietnamese troops and supplies from getting into South Vietnam. She detected over 4,200 suspicious vessels and craft, closely monitored the movement of more than 1,320 of them and boarded 27 vessels to inspect of both their cargo and crew. Spencer detained 52 "enemy suspects" and turned them over to the South Vietnamese military for questioning. She also executed 13 naval gunfire missions in support of operations on land, destroying or damaging over 160 enemy structures, bunkers, and base camps. Spencer left Vietnam at the end of September and returned to the United States.

For the next five years, Spencer continued her peace-time mission of ocean station keeping.

== Retirement ==
Spencer served for over 37 years and when decommissioned in 1974, she was the most decorated cutter in the Coast Guard's fleet. Her last voyage was from New York City to the United States Coast Guard Yard, Curtis Bay on 15 January 1974. On board her for this voyage were 24 of her World War II crew. She was decommissioned on 23 January 1974.

She served as an engineering training ship with students using her steam propulsion plant until 15 December 1980. She was then sold to the North American Smelting Company and scrapped.

== Awards ==
- Presidential Unit Citation
- China Service Medal
- American Defense Service Medal
- American Campaign Medal
- European-African-Middle Eastern Campaign Medal with five battle stars
- Asiatic-Pacific Campaign Medal with four battle stars
- World War II Victory Medal
- Navy Occupation Medal with "ASIA" clasp
- National Defense Service Medal with one service star
- Vietnam Service Medal with three campaign stars
- Philippine Presidential Unit Citation
- Philippine Liberation Medal
- Republic of Vietnam Meritorious Unit Citation with Gallantry Cross with Palm
- Republic of Vietnam Campaign Medal
