= USS Pleiades (AK-46) =

Cargo ship of the United States Navy

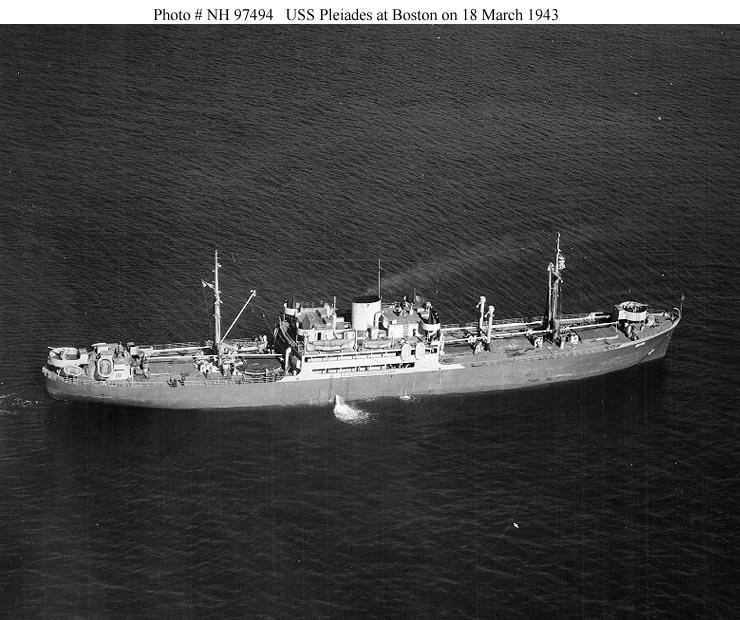

History

United States
- Laid down: date not known
- Launched: in 1939 as MS Mangalia
- Acquired: 11 August 1941
- Commissioned: 25 October 1941
- Decommissioned: 21 November 1945
- Stricken: date unknown
- Fate: Sold for scrapping in 1966

General characteristics
- Displacement: 8,185 tons
- Length: 383 ft 2 in (116.79 m)
- Beam: 50 ft 11 in (15.52 m)
- Draught: 23 ft (7.0 m)
- Installed power: 3200bhp
- Propulsion: FIAT slow speed diesel engine
- Speed: 13 kts.
- Complement: 10 officers, approx. 75 enlisted
- Crew: 85
- Armament: two 3 in (76 mm)guns, two 0.5 in (12.7 mm) machine guns

USS Pleiades (AK-46) was commissioned by the U.S. Navy for service in World War II. She was responsible for delivering military personnel and equipment to ships and stations in the war zone.

Built in 1939 as MS Mangalia for the Romanian State Maritime Service by Cantieri Navali Riuniti, Palermo, Italy, was taken over while lying idle at New York City, 25 June 1941, by the U.S. Maritime Commission under the authority of Public Law 101 (77th Congress) and Executive Order 8771; acquired by the Navy on a bareboat charter from WSA, 11 August 1941; renamed Pleiades (AK-46), 3 September 1941; and commissioned 25 October 1941.

== World War II North Atlantic operations ==
Following an abbreviated shakedown, Pleiades loaded cargo at Quonset Point, Rhode Island, and on 22 November, got underway on her first convoy run through the U-boat infested waters of the North Atlantic Ocean to Iceland. Returning to New York the day after the United States entered World War II, Pleiades completed ten more convoy runs, six to Iceland and four to the United Kingdom by July 1943.

== A very dangerous convoy run ==
Of those, convoys ON 67 in February and Convoy SC 107, which departed New York 24 October 1942, were the most hazardous. On 1 November, with five ships in each column, 9 column convoy SC 107 took departure from Canada for Iceland, and the United Kingdom. Shortly before 20:00, a wolfpack closed on the convoy, and, for almost 70 hours, struck at the columns, repeatedly scoring hits. At 18:37, 4 November, they sank their last ship and departed, having sunk 15, and damaged one other.

== Converted to general stores ==
Steaming south, 25 July 1943, Pleiades spent August, September, and October on a Brazilian run, then, in mid-November returned to the North Atlantic to ply those waters again until June 1944. Converted to a general stores issue vessel, she joined Service Force, Atlantic, 3 July, and three weeks later departed Lynnhaven Roads for the Mediterranean.

== Supporting the invasion of Southern France ==
She anchored at Naples, Italy, 17 August; discharged cargo there until 2 September; then, acting as flagship for a convoy of LCIs, got underway for southern France. Encountering a mistral en route, she delivered her charges to Saint-Tropez, 4 September. From the 5th through the 23rd, she distributed supplies to U.S. 8th Fleet units at St. Tropez, San Raphael, and Marseille, then sailed to Bizerte, whence she returned to the United States, mooring at Boston, Massachusetts, 29 October.

== Tropical South Atlantic runs ==
Following alterations, Pleiades steamed to Bayonne, New Jersey, to load cargo for Brazil. She completed that Belém-Recife-Bahia run at New York, 12 January 1945; underwent repairs; and then commenced a series of sugar runs to the Caribbean which continued until after the end of World War II. On 4 November, she arrived at New York to complete her last cargo run as a U.S. Navy ship.

== Post-war decommissioning ==
Decommissioned 21 November, she was returned, the same day, to the Maritime Commission, under which she resumed merchant service with the name SS Scepter.

== Military awards and honors ==
Pleiades (AK-46) earned two battle stars for World War II service. Her crew members were eligible for the following medals:

- Combat Action Ribbon (Convoy SC 107, 1–4 November 1943)
- American Defense Service Medal (with Fleet clasp)
- American Campaign Medal
- Europe-Africa-Middle East Campaign Medal (2)
- World War II Victory Medal
