= USS Edison (DD-439) =

Gleaves-class destroyer

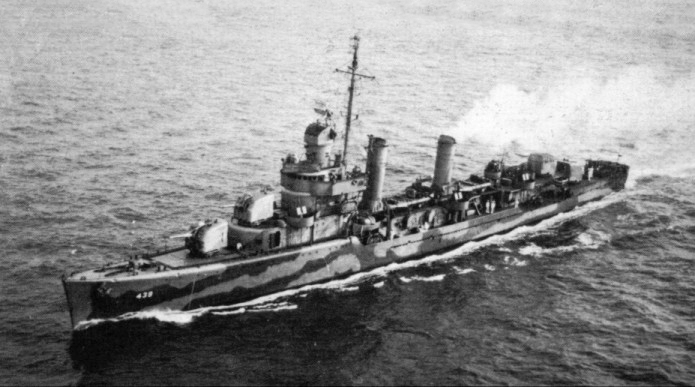
- USS Edison (DD-439) on 26 May 1942.

History

United States
- Name: Edison
- Namesake: Thomas Alva Edison
- Builder: Federal Shipbuilding and Drydock Company
- Laid down: 18 March 1940
- Launched: 23 November 1940
- Commissioned: 31 January 1941
- Decommissioned: 18 May 1946
- Stricken: 1 April 1966
- Fate: Sold 29 December 1966 and broken up for scrap

General characteristics
- Class & type: Gleaves-class destroyer
- Displacement: 1,630 tons
- Length: 348 ft 3 in (106.15 m)
- Beam: 36 ft 1 in (11.00 m)
- Draft: 11 ft 10 in (3.61 m)
- Propulsion: 50,000 shp (37,000 kW); 4 boilers; 2 propellers
- Speed: 37.4 knots (69 km/h)
- Range: 6,500 nmi (12,000 km; 7,500 mi) at 12 kn (22 km/h; 14 mph)
- Complement: 16 officers, 260 enlisted
- Armament: 4 × 5 in (127 mm) DP guns, 6 × 0.5 in (12.7 mm) guns, 6 × 20 mm AA guns, 10 × 21 in (533 mm) torpedo tubes, 2 × depth charge tracks

USS Edison (DD-439), a Gleaves-class destroyer, was the first ship of the United States Navy to be named for Thomas Alva Edison, an inventor and businessman who developed many important devices and received the Navy Distinguished Service Medal for his contributions to the Navy during World War I. Edison was one of the few U.S. Navy ships to be named for a civilian.

Edison was launched 23 November 1940 by Federal Shipbuilding and Drydock Company, Kearny, New Jersey sponsored by Mina Miller Edison, widow of the inventor; and commissioned 31 January 1941, Lieutenant Commander A. C. Murdaugh in command. Murdaugh was allowed to hand-pick the specific 5"/38 caliber gun barrels to be installed on the ship himself, but, much to his dismay, President Roosevelt personally ordered them transferred to the British cruiser HMS Delhi.

== Service history ==
In the months following commissioning, Edison operated on the east coast, training and exercising with the fleet, with passenger and mail runs to NS Argentia, Newfoundland. In November she escorted a convoy to Iceland, her first of many voyages which kept the lifelines open to northern bases and Britain.

In February 1942 Edison escorted Convoy ON 67 from Iceland to Halifax, Nova Scotia. Between 21 and 25 February, Edison helped defend the convoy against three U-boat attacks.

On 24 October 1942 Edison set sail from Norfolk with a task group bound for the invasion at Fedhala, French Morocco, 8 November. She engaged shore batteries and enemy destroyers at Cape Fedhala and protected shipping lying off the beachheads during the Naval Battle of Casablanca:

A total of 362 rounds were fired, 74 at the shore battery, 20 in the first engagement, and 268 in the second destroyer engagement, of which it is estimated that 200 rounds were fired at the first destroyer and 68 at the second. All firing was director-controlled, rapid, continuous fire. The average gun range for the first firing was 9,500 yards, for the second 14,000 yards, and for the third 12,500 yards ... ... It is particularly pleasing that the guns maintained a sustained rapid fire of 268 rounds (average 68 rounds per gun) at an estimated rate of at least 12 shots per gun per minute without casualty.

Returning to Norfolk 1 December, Edison made a voyage to Gulf ports escorting tankers, then resumed safeguarding convoys from New York City and Norfolk to Casablanca and Oran.

From July 1943 to February 1944, Edison served in the Mediterranean Sea. On 10 July she provided fire support for the troops landing on Sicily to which she escorted support convoys from Algiers and Bizerte until September. She screened the assault transports in the invasion at Salerno on 9 September, and remained off the beaches to guard minesweepers and provide fire support for the advancing troops. Continuing Mediterranean escort duty, on 16 December Edison screened while Woolsey forced U-73 to the surface with depth charges and sank it with gunfire. Edison picked up 11 survivors. On 21 January 1944 Edison arrived off Anzio to patrol during the invasion landings. She provided fire support to the beleaguered troops and escorted transports and cargo ships to the beachhead until February, then sailed home for overhaul.

Edison returned to the Mediterranean 1 May 1944 for escort and patrol off Italy. On 15 August she was in the thick of the invasion of southern France. Until the end of the year, she continued to pound shore batteries, railroads, and troop concentrations as well as patrol. At New York 17 January 1945, Edison underwent overhaul then escorted a convoy to Le Havre during April and May.

=== Convoys escorted ===
Convoy	Escort Group	Dates	Notes
ON 34		12–21 Nov 1941	from Iceland to Newfoundland prior to US declaration of war
HX 163		5–15 Dec 1941	from Newfoundland to Iceland; war declared during convoy
ON 47		22–23 Dec 1941	from Iceland to Newfoundland
HX 170		16–24 Jan 1942	from Newfoundland to Iceland
HX 173		3–10 Feb 1942	from Newfoundland to Iceland
ON 67		19–28 Feb 1942	from Iceland to Newfoundland
HX 180	MOEF group A5	19–26 March 1942	from Newfoundland to Northern Ireland
ON 81	MOEF group A5	30 March-9 April 1942	from Northern Ireland to Newfoundland
AT 17		1–12 July 1942	troopships from New York City to Firth of Clyde

=== Post-war ===
Edison sailed inter coastal from New York 8 June 1945, and was training at Pearl Harbor when the war ended. She reached Japan in September for the occupation. She left Nagoya on 3 November to be a weather station in the Aleutians. The destroyer returned to San Francisco on 30 December, then continued to the east coast where she was placed out of commission in reserve at Charleston 18 May 1946, later in Philadelphia, where she lay at end of 1962. She was sold on 29 December 1966.

== Awards ==
- American Defense Service Medal with "FLEET" clasp
- American Campaign Medal with one battle star
- European-African-Middle Eastern Campaign Medal with five battle stars
- Asiatic-Pacific Campaign Medal
- World War II Victory Medal
- Navy Occupation Medal with "ASIA" clasp
