= Thomas C. Cooney =

United States Navy Medal of Honor recipient (1853–1907)

- Born: July 18, 1853; Westport, Nova Scotia
- Died: January 8, 1907 (aged 53); Norfolk, Virginia, U.S.
- Burial place: United States Naval Academy Cemetery, Annapolis, Maryland
- Military career
- Allegiance: United States
- Branch: United States Navy
- Rank: Chief Carpenter's Mate
- Unit: USS Winslow
- Conflicts: Spanish–American War
- Awards: Medal of Honor

Thomas Calvin Cooney (July 18, 1853- January 8, 1907) was an American sailor serving in the United States Navy during the Spanish–American War, who received the Medal of Honor for bravery.

== Biography ==
Cooney was born on July 18, 1853, in Westport, Nova Scotia, and after entering the navy he rose to the rank of Chief Carpenters Mate and fought in the Spanish–American War aboard the U.S. Torpedo Boat Winslow.

He died on January 8, 1907, and is buried in United States Naval Academy Cemetery.

== Medal of Honor citation ==
Rank and organization: Chief Machinist, U.S. Navy. Born: 18 July 1853, Westport, Nova Scotia. Accredited to: New Jersey. G.O. No.: 497, 3 September 1898.

Citation:

On board the U.S. Torpedo Boat Winslow during the action at Cardenas, Cuba, 11 May 1898. Following the piercing of the boiler by an enemy shell, Cooney, by his gallantry and promptness in extinguishing the resulting flames, saved the boiler tubes from burning out.

== See also ==
- List of Medal of Honor recipients for the Spanish–American War
