= John Bernadou =

US Navy officer (1858–1908)

John Baptiste Bernadou
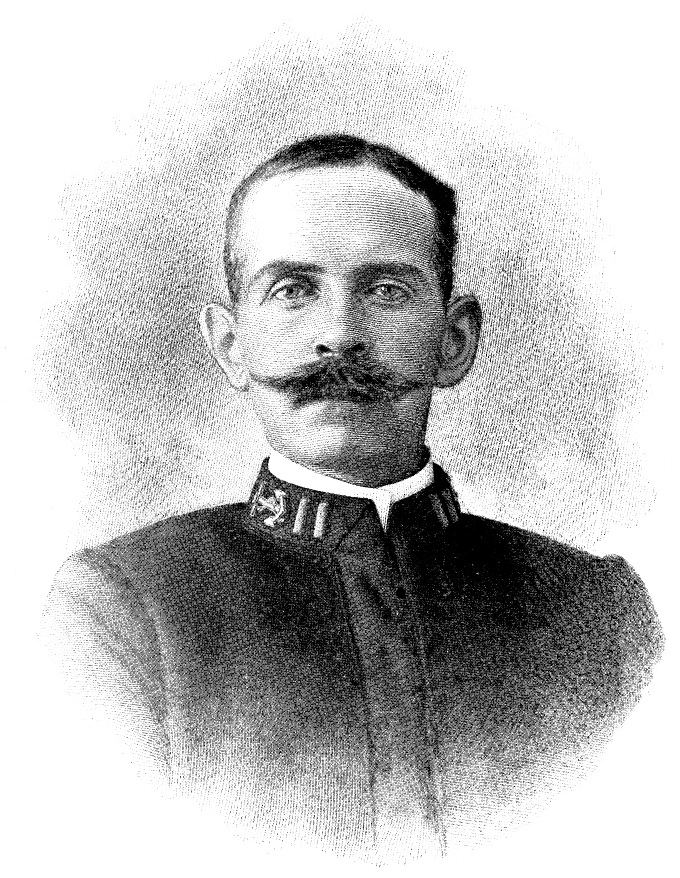
- John Baptiste Bernadou
- Born: November 14, 1858; Philadelphia, Pennsylvania
- Died: October 2, 1908 (aged 49); Brooklyn, New York
- Military career
- Allegiance: United States of America
- Branch: United States Navy
- Service years: 1880–1908
- Rank: Commander
- Commands: USS Winslow
- Conflicts: Spanish–American War: First Battle of Cárdenas; Second Battle of Cardenas

John Baptiste Bernadou (November 14, 1858 – October 2, 1908) was an officer in the United States Navy during the Spanish–American War. Born in Philadelphia, Bernadou graduated from the Naval Academy in 1880. He was promoted ten numbers for gallantry in action while commanding USS Winslow at the First and Second Battle of Cardenas, Cuba, from May 8 to May 11, 1898. John Baptiste Bernadou died at the Naval Hospital in Brooklyn, New York, on October 2, 1908, and is buried with his wife Florence Whiting in Arlington National Cemetery. (Section S. Div Site 2004 W.S)

== Background ==
John Baptiste Bernadou—born on November 14, 1858, in Philadelphia—was appointed to the United States Naval Academy on September 12, 1876, and graduated with the class of 1880. After a short tour of shore duty at Claymont, Delaware, he served at sea in the screw sloop USS Kearsarge until 1882. Warranted midshipman on June 2 of that year, he was assigned to the Bureau of Navigation in Washington, D.C., and was commissioned ensign (junior grade) on March 3, 1883. Between 1883 and 1885, Bernadou served on special duty in Korea. He was one of 18 naval officers serving with the Smithsonian Institution. His travels to Korea were to investigate the country's economic and strategic potential. Bernadou learned the Korean language and collected a considerable amount of artifacts and drawings, of which he donated to the Institution. On June 26, 1884, he was promoted to ensign.

== Pre-Spanish–American War duties ==
Upon returning to the United States, Bernadou was assigned to the recently revitalized Office of Naval Intelligence (ONI). There, he went to work studying world economic conditions with a particular emphasis on the world's supply of nickel ore. The importance of that commodity resulted from the navy's adoption of nickel-processed steel for its new ship construction. He also collected information on foreign seaports, assisting in the writing of a book on international ports and coaling stations. His facility with foreign languages put him in an ideal position to translate articles of value to ONI from French, German, Russian, Swedish, Spanish, and other languages.

Between February 1891 and May 1893, he served in the cruiser USS Newark (C-1). On July 1, 1892, he was promoted to lieutenant (junior grade). He took a leave of absence because of illness from May to July 1893 and then returned to sea in USS Bennington (Gunboat No. 4). In that warship, he made a cruise to European and Mediterranean waters, there transferring to the protected cruiser USS Chicago.

In September 1894, Bernadou began three years of service at the Naval Torpedo Station located at Newport, Rhode Island, where he continued the work of Charles Munroe developing a satisfactory smokeless powder for naval artillery. While in that assignment, he was promoted to lieutenant in June 1896. In 1897 he patented a nitrocellulose powder colloided with ether and alcohol. The Navy licensed or sold patents for this formulation to DuPont and the California Powder Works while retaining manufacturing rights for the Naval Powder Factory, Indian Head, Maryland constructed in 1900. The United States Army adopted Bernadou's formulation in 1908 and began manufacture at Picatinny Arsenal. In December 1897, Bernadou went to the Norfolk Navy Yard where he put USS Winslow (Torpedo Boat No. 5) into commission on the 29th as her first commanding officer.

== Spanish–American War ==
War with Spain erupted late in April 1898, and Bernadou was soon patrolling the northern coast of Cuba in Winslow. On May 8, Barnadou blockaded the port of Cardenas with USS Machias. That day, Machias left for a patrol leaving only the Winslow for blockading. Three Spanish gunboats which were trapped in the port decided to sortie and attempt to lift the blockade, in the ensuing battle, Winslow damaged all three Spanish vessels and sent them back into port. On May 11, he took Winslow to take on coal from one of the larger warships there. Upon reporting to the commanding officer of USS Wilmington (Gunboat No. 8), he received orders to take Winslow into the bay at Cardenas and scout for mines. Winslow and the revenue cutter Hudson searched the harbor entrance but found no mines. They rejoined Wilmington about noon to make their report. Wilmington's commanding officer decided to take the three warships into the bay in search of the three Spanish gunboats reported there. Bernadou's command marked shoal water to Wilmington's portside during the entry. Upon reaching a point about 3,000 yards from the city, a lookout spied a small, gray steamer moored alongside the wharf. Bernadou then received orders to move his ship in closer to determine whether or not the ship was an enemy warship.

At around 13:35, his warship reached a point about 1,500 yards from the object of his interest when a white puff of smoke announced the opening of an artillery duel that would last an hour and 20 minutes. Bernadou responded with Winslow's one pounder guns, and then enemy batteries ashore joined the deadly contest. Bernadou's little ship bore the brunt of the Spanish fury, and she soon received a number of direct hits. The first shell to strike her destroyed both her steam and manual steering gear. Bernadou's crew tried to rig some type of auxiliary steering gear while he steered her with the propellers in an attempt to keep her bow gun unmasked and to present the enemy with as small a target as possible. All at once, however, Winslow swung broadside to the shore batteries. Quickly, a shot knocked out her port main engine. Bernadou then tried to maneuver his warship with the remaining engine to evade Spanish fire and to keep his guns in action. At some point before that time, a shell burst on the top of the forward conning tower; and a fragment from it struck Bernadou in the thigh.

Almost simultaneously, Wilmington and Hudson brought their larger guns to bear on the Spanish shore batteries. The Spanish gunboat received fatal hits, and her crew abandoned her, while the shore batteries slackened fire. Bernadou requested Hudson to tow his all-but-disabled torpedo boat out of action. A towline was passed between the two ships, but it soon parted. Spanish shore batteries continued their fire, and one shell burst near the after engine room hatch killing four of the crew and Ens. Worth Bagley, the only American naval officer killed by enemy action in the Spanish–American War.

The towline was finally rerigged, and Winslow, badly damaged, was towed clear of the action. Bernadou relinquished command of the ship to Chief Gunner's Mate George P. Brady and went over to Wilmington with the rest of the wounded. For his gallantry at Cardenas, Bernadou received a commendation and advancement (10 numbers) in seniority.

== Post war ==
After recovering from his wounds, Bernadou returned to duty at the Bureau of Ordnance where he served from late 1898 until sometime in 1899. No doubt, he resumed the work on perfecting smokeless gunpowder that he had performed previously at Newport, Rhode Island. In 1899, he returned to sea in USS Indiana (Battleship No. 1). In 1900, he transferred briefly to newly commissioned USS Kentucky (Battleship No. 6) before joining the training ship USS Dixie. He made two cruises to Mediterranean waters and served briefly on the South Atlantic Station. On February 9, 1902, probably while still assigned to Dixie, Bernadou was promoted to lieutenant commander. Later that year, he began another tour of duty with ONI in Washington, D.C. That assignment lasted until 1904 when he returned to sea as executive officer of Kearsarge (Battleship No. 5). He served in that billet until sometime early in 1906. After a brief tour of duty at the Naval War College in Newport, Rhode Island, Bernadou went to Europe to serve as naval attaché in Rome and Vienna. On December 11, 1906, while in Europe, Bernadou was promoted to commander. He remained on diplomatic duty until sometime in mid 1908 when complications caused by the wound he received at Cardenas forced him to return home. Bernadou died at the Naval Hospital, Brooklyn, New York, on October 2, 1908. Three days later, he was buried with full military honors in the National Cemetery at Arlington, Virginia.

== Namesake ==
- The destroyer USS Bernadou (DD-153) was named for John Baptiste Bernadou.
