= Hans Johnsen =

United States Navy Medal of Honor recipient

- Born: January 3, 1865; Sandnes, Norway
- Died: June 17, 1920 (aged 55)
- Burial place: Bayview-New York Bay Cemetery Jersey City, New Jersey
- Military career
- Allegiance: United States
- Branch: United States Navy
- Rank: Lieutenant
- Unit: USS Winslow
- Conflicts: Spanish–American War
- Awards: Medal of Honor

Hans Johnsen (January 3, 1865 – June 17, 1920) was a chief machinist serving in the United States Navy during the Spanish–American War who received the Medal of Honor for bravery.

== Biography ==
Johnsen was born January 3, 1865, in Sandnes, Norway, and after entering the navy was sent to fight in the Spanish–American War aboard the torpedo boat USS Winslow as a chief machinist.

Johnsen was warranted as a gunner on June 27, 1898, and was promoted to chief gunner on June 27, 1904. During World War I, he received a temporary promotion to lieutenant on July 1, 1918.

He died June 17, 1920.

== Medal of Honor citation ==
Rank and organization: Chief Machinist, U.S. Navy. Born: 3 January 1865, Sandnes, Norway. Accredited to: Pennsylvania. G.O. No.: 497, 3 September 1898.

Citation:

On board the torpedo boat Winslow during the action at Cardenas, Cuba, 11 May 1898. Showing great presence of mind, Johnsen turned off the steam from the engine which had been wrecked by a shell bursting in the cylinder.

== See also ==
- List of Medal of Honor recipients for the Spanish–American War
