= USS Bernadou =

Wickes-class destroyer

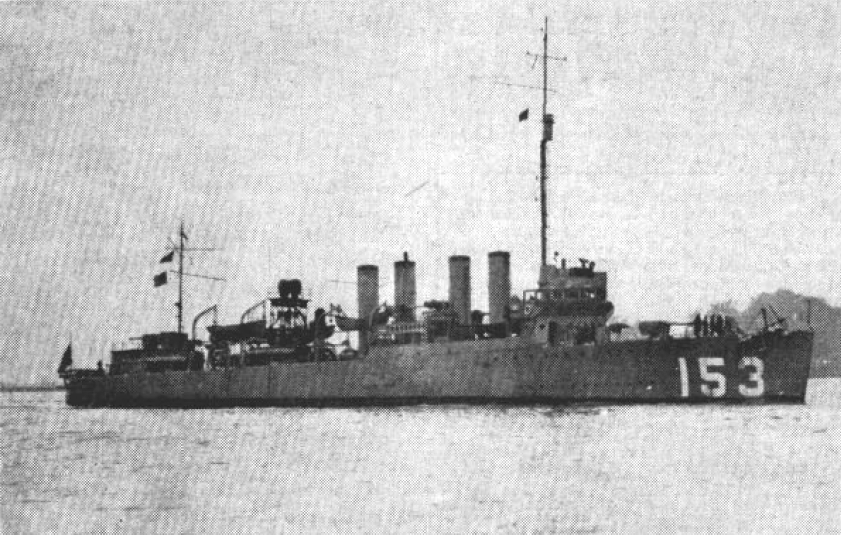
- USS Bernadou in November 1921

History

United States
- Name: Bernadou
- Namesake: John Bernadou
- Builder: William Cramp & Sons, Philadelphia
- Cost: $1,448,315.46 (hull and machinery)
- Yard number: 468
- Laid down: 4 June 1918
- Launched: 7 November 1918
- Commissioned: 19 May 1919
- Decommissioned: 1 July 1922
- Identification: DD-153
- Recommissioned: 1 May 1930
- Decommissioned: 17 July 1945
- Stricken: 13 August 1945
- Fate: Sold for scrapping, 30 November 1945

General characteristics
- Class & type: Wickes-class destroyer
- Displacement: 1,154 tons
- Length: 314 ft 5 in (95.8 m)
- Beam: 31 ft 8 in (9.7 m)
- Draft: 9 ft 0 in (2.7 m)
- Speed: 35 knots (65 km/h)
- Complement: 122 officers and enlisted
- Armament: 4 × 4 in (102 mm)/50 guns; 2 × 3 in (76 mm)/23 guns; 12 × 21 in (533 mm) torpedo tubes

USS Bernadou (DD–153) was a Wickes-class destroyer in the United States Navy during World War II. She was named for Commander John Bernadou. Bernadou was launched on 7 November 1918 by William Cramp & Sons Ship and Engine Building Company, Philadelphia. The ship was sponsored by Miss Cora Winslow Bernadou, Commander Bernadou's sister. The destroyer was commissioned on 19 May 1919.

== Service history ==
Following a cruise to Europe in mid-1919, Bernadou joined Division 19, Atlantic Fleet, and cruised along the east coast until placed out of commission at Philadelphia Navy Yard on 1 July 1922. She joined Squadron 7, Scouting Force, after recommissioning on 1 May 1930. Out of service September 1936-October 1939, she then rejoined the fleet for service with Destroyer Division 6, Atlantic Squadron, on Neutrality Patrol.

She helped convoy the Marines to Iceland (1 July 1941 – 7 July 1941) and, except for one crossing to Britain, remained on the Newfoundland-Iceland convoy run until late 1942. On 5 February 1942 Bernadou rescued ten surviving men in an open lifeboat in the North Atlantic, from the ship SS Gandia, after being sunk by U-135 14 days previously. Eight men had froze to death in the lifeboat of 18 men.

On 25 October 1942 she departed Norfolk, Virginia to take part in the invasion of North Africa (8–11 November). She won a Presidential Unit Citation for landing assault troops inside the harbor of Safi, French Morocco.

Returning to Boston on 26 November she remained on east coast convoy duty until February 1943. Bernadou made a convoy run to Gibraltar during March and April and on 10 May departed Norfolk for Oran, Algeria. She operated from Oran until December 1943 during which time she screened the Amphibious Battle of Gela during the occupation of Sicily (9–12 July); took part in the Salerno landings (9–10 September and 21–23 September), and escorted Mediterranean convoys.

She returned to the United States in December 1943 and escorted two convoys to North Africa (22 February 1944 – 9 June 1944) before retiring to the less rigorous east coast-Caribbean runs. From October 1944 to May 1945, she served as plane guard and escort vessel during carrier exercises off the east coast. She arrived at Philadelphia Navy Yard on 8 June 1945 and was decommissioned on 17 July. The destroyer was sold for scrap on 30 November 1945.

== Awards ==
In addition to her Presidential Unit Citation, Bernadou received five battle stars for her World War II service.

As of 2004, no other ship in the United States Navy has borne this name.

== Convoys escorted ==
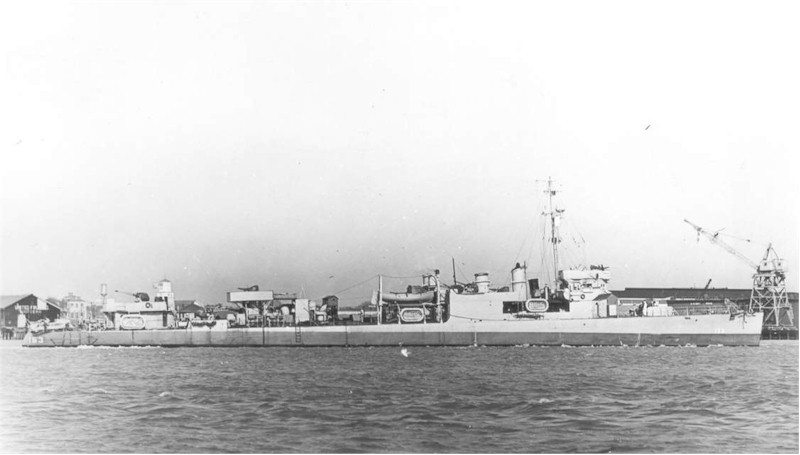
USS Bernadou (DD-153) during World War II.

Convoy	Escort Group	Dates	Notes
	task force 19	1–7 July 1941	occupation of Iceland prior to US declaration of war
HX 153		7-13 Oct 1941	from Newfoundland to Iceland prior to US declaration of war
ON 28		25 Oct-3 Nov 1941	from Iceland to Newfoundland prior to US declaration of war
HX 161		23 Nov-3 Dec 1941	from Newfoundland to Iceland prior to US declaration of war
ON 43		11-15 Dec 1941	from Iceland to Newfoundland
HX 173		3-10 Feb 1942	from Newfoundland to Iceland
ON 67		19-28 Feb 1942	from Iceland to Newfoundland
ON 89	MOEF group A1	23–26 April 1942	from Northern Ireland to Newfoundland
