= German submarine U-158 (1941) =

German World War II submarine

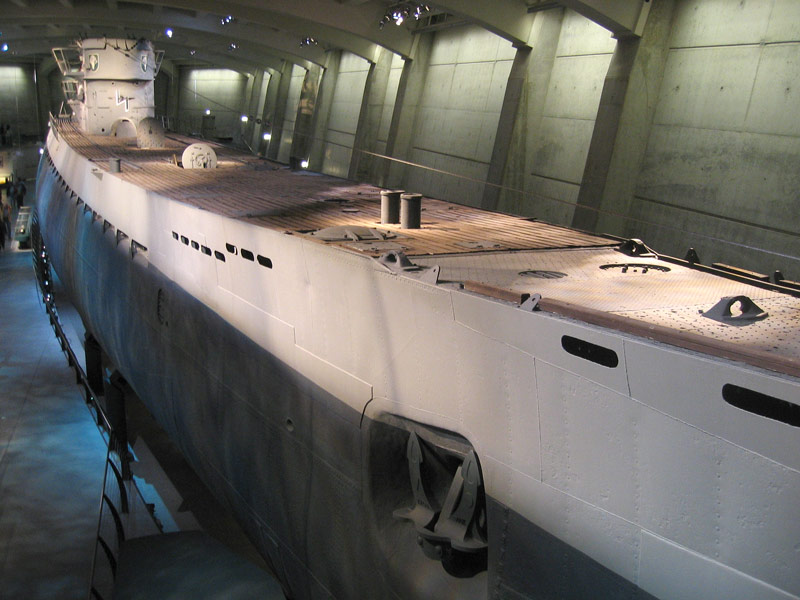
- U-505, a typical Type IXC boat

History

Nazi Germany
- Name: U-158
- Ordered: 25 September 1939
- Builder: DeSchiMAG AG Weser, Bremen
- Yard number: 1000
- Laid down: 1 November 1940
- Launched: 21 June 1941
- Commissioned: 25 September 1941
- Fate: Sunk, 30 June 1942

General characteristics
- Class & type: Type IXC submarine
- Displacement: 1,120 t (1,100 long tons) surfaced; 1,232 t (1,213 long tons) submerged
- Length: 76.76 m (251 ft 10 in) o/a; 58.75 m (192 ft 9 in) pressure hull
- Beam: 6.76 m (22 ft 2 in) o/a; 4.40 m (14 ft 5 in) pressure hull
- Height: 9.60 m (31 ft 6 in)
- Draught: 4.70 m (15 ft 5 in)
- Installed power: 4,400 PS (3,200 kW; 4,300 bhp) (diesels); 1,000 PS (740 kW; 990 shp) (electric)
- Propulsion: 2 shafts; 2 × diesel engines; 2 × electric motors
- Speed: 18.3 knots (33.9 km/h; 21.1 mph) surfaced; 7.7 knots (14.3 km/h; 8.9 mph) submerged
- Range: 13,450 nmi (24,910 km; 15,480 mi) at 10 knots (19 km/h; 12 mph) surfaced; 64 nmi (119 km; 74 mi) at 4 knots (7.4 km/h; 4.6 mph) submerged
- Test depth: 230 m (750 ft)
- Complement: 4 officers, 44 enlisted
- Armament: 6 × torpedo tubes (4 bow, 2 stern); 22 × 53.3 cm (21 in) torpedoes; 1 × 10.5 cm (4.1 in) SK C/32 deck gun (180 rounds); 1 × 3.7 cm (1.5 in) SK C/30 AA gun; 1 × twin 2 cm FlaK 30 AA guns

Service record
- Part of: 4th U-boat Flotilla; 25 September 1941 – 31 January 1942; 10th U-boat Flotilla; 1 February – 30 June 1942
- Identification codes: M 14 343
- Commanders: Kptlt. Erwin Rostin; 25 September 1941 – 30 June 1942
- Operations: 2 patrols: 1st patrol: 7 February – 31 March 1942; 2nd patrol: 4 May – 30 June 1942
- Victories: 17 merchant ships sunk (101,321 GRT); 2 merchant ships damaged (15,264 GRT)

German submarine U-158 was a Type IXC U-boat of Nazi Germany's Kriegsmarine built for service during World War II.

Her keel was laid down on 1 November 1940 by DeSchiMAG AG Weser in Bremen as yard number 1000. She was commissioned on 25 September 1941, with Kapitänleutnant Erwin Rostin (Knights Cross) in command.

== Design ==
German Type IXC submarines were slightly larger than the original Type IXBs. U-158 had a displacement of 1,120 tonnes (1,100 long tons) when at the surface and 1,232 tonnes (1,213 long tons) while submerged. The U-boat had a total length of 76.76 m (251 ft 10 in), a pressure hull length of 58.75 m (192 ft 9 in), a beam of 6.76 m (22 ft 2 in), a height of 9.60 m (31 ft 6 in), and a draught of 4.70 m (15 ft 5 in). The submarine was powered by two MAN M 9 V 40/46 supercharged four-stroke, nine-cylinder diesel engines producing a total of 4,400 metric horsepower (3,240 kW; 4,340 shp) for use while surfaced, two Siemens-Schuckert 2 GU 345/34 double-acting electric motors producing a total of 1,000 metric horsepower (740 kW; 990 shp) for use while submerged. She had two shafts and two 1.92 m (6 ft) propellers. The boat was capable of operating at depths of up to 230 metres (750 ft).

The submarine had a maximum surface speed of 18.3 knots (33.9 km/h; 21.1 mph) and a maximum submerged speed of 7.3 knots (13.5 km/h; 8.4 mph). When submerged, the boat could operate for 63 nautical miles (117 km; 72 mi) at 4 knots (7.4 km/h; 4.6 mph); when surfaced, she could travel 13,450 nautical miles (24,910 km; 15,480 mi) at 10 knots (19 km/h; 12 mph). U-158 was fitted with six 53.3 cm (21 in) torpedo tubes (four fitted at the bow and two at the stern), 22 torpedoes, one 10.5 cm (4.13 in) SK C/32 naval gun, 180 rounds, and a 3.7 cm (1.5 in) SK C/30 as well as a 2 cm (0.79 in) C/30 anti-aircraft gun. The boat had a complement of forty-eight.

== Service history ==
U-158 conducted only two combat patrols, sinking 17 ships totalling 101,321 gross register tons (GRT) and damaging two others totalling 15,264 GRT.

=== First patrol ===
U-158 departed the German administered island of Helgoland, (sometimes spelt 'Heligoland'), for her first patrol on 7 February 1942. Her route took her north of the British Isles, through the gap between Iceland and the Faroe Islands and into the Atlantic Ocean.

Her first victim was Empire Celt, sunk about 420 nmi (780 km; 480 mi) south southeast of St Johns on 24 February. The ship broke in two after being hit and the stern section was last seen on 4 March. In the same attack, the U-boat also damaged Diloma. This tanker was able to proceed under her own power at reduced speed. She was repaired in Baltimore and returned to service in June 1942.

The submarine then moved further down the US east coast. She sank another four ships and damaged one more. They were: Finnanger (1 March), Caribsea (11 March), John D. Gill (13 March), Olean (damaged on 15 March) and Ario (also on 15 March).

John D. Gill was another tanker; her cargo did not ignite on being hit by a torpedo. Instead, the surrounding water was turned into a blazing inferno after a seaman threw a life ring overboard and its built-in carbide lamp malfunctioned. Almost half the crew died.

Olean was towed to Hampton Roads, rebuilt and renamed Sweep and then returned to service.

Having caused so much mayhem, the boat sailed for France, arriving at Lorient on 31 March 1942.

=== Second patrol ===
For her second foray, U-158 moved into the Caribbean and the Gulf of Mexico in May 1942. On the way she sank Darina about 500 nmi (930 km; 580 mi) east southeast of Bermuda on 4 May and Frank B. Baird on the 22nd.

Following the sinking of Knoxville City on 2 June, the survivors in their lifeboats declined an offer of help from Jamaica as they thought the German submarine was still nearby.

The Hermis, despite being hit by two torpedoes on the seventh, maintained a speed of eight knots due to the engines still running. The U-boat surfaced and shelled the ship. She was observed some twelve hours later with her stern out of the water; she eventually sank shortly afterward.

== Fate ==
U-158 was sunk on 30 June 1942, west of the Bermudas, in position 32°50′N 67°28′W, by depth charges from a PBM Mariner aircraft commanded by Richard Schreder of United States Navy Squadron VP-74. None of her 54 crewmen on board survived the sinking.

== Summary of raiding history ==
Date	Ship	Nationality	Tonnage (Note: Merchant ship tonnages are in gross register tons. Military vessels are listed by tons displacement.)	Fate
24 February 1942	Diloma	United Kingdom	8,146	Damaged
24 February 1942	Empire Celt	United Kingdom	8,032	Sunk
1 March 1942	Finnager	Norway	9,551	Sunk
11 March 1942	Caribsea	United States	2,609	Sunk
13 March 1942	John D. Gill	United States	11,641	Sunk
15 March 1942	Ario	United States	6,952	Sunk
15 March 1942	Olean	United States	7,118	Damaged
20 May 1942	Darina	United Kingdom	8,113	Sunk
22 May 1942	Frank D. Baird	Canada	1,748	Sunk
2 June 1942	Knoxville City	United States	5,686	Sunk
4 June 1942	Nidarnes	Norway	2,647	Sunk
5 June 1942	Velma Lykes	United States	2,572	Sunk
7 June 1942	Hermis	Panama	5,234	Sunk
11 June 1942	Sheherazade	Panama	13,467	Sunk
12 June 1942	Cities Service Toledo	United States	8,192	Sunk
17 June 1942	Moira	Norway	1,560	Sunk
17 June 1942	San Blas	Panama	3,601	Sunk
23 June 1942	Major General Henry Gibbins	United States Navy	5,766	Sunk
23 June 1942	Everalda	Latvia	3,950	Sunk

== Bibliography ==
- Busch, Rainer; Röll, Hans-Joachim (1999). German U-boat commanders of World War II : a biographical dictionary. Translated by Brooks, Geoffrey. London, Annapolis, Md: Greenhill Books, Naval Institute Press. ISBN 1-55750-186-6.
- Busch, Rainer; Röll, Hans-Joachim (1999). Deutsche U-Boot-Verluste von September 1939 bis Mai 1945 [German U-boat losses from September 1939 to May 1945]. Der U-Boot-Krieg (in German). Vol. IV. Hamburg, Berlin, Bonn: Mittler. ISBN 3-8132-0514-2.
- Gröner, Erich; Jung, Dieter; Maass, Martin (1991). U-boats and Mine Warfare Vessels. German Warships 1815–1945. Vol. 2. Translated by Thomas, Keith; Magowan, Rachel. London: Conway Maritime Press. ISBN 0-85177-593-4.
- Kemp, Paul (1999). Ships hit by U-Boats Destroyed – German Submarine Losses in the World Wars. London: Arms & Armour. ISBN 1-85409-515-3.
