= SS Norholm =

Tanker built in 1942

History
- Name: SS Empire Druid (1941–42); SS Norholm (1942–46); SS Haukefjell (1946–49); MV Haukefjell (1949–52); MV Bluewater (1952–59)
- Owner: Ministry of War Transport (1941–42); Norwegian Government (1942–46); A/S Falkefjell (1946–52); Compagnia Atlantica Pacifica SA (1952–59)
- Operator: unknown manager (1941–42); Nortraship (1942–46); Olsen & Ugelstad (1946–52); Tidewater Commercial Co Inc (1952–59)
- Port of registry: United Kingdom (1941–42); Oslo, Norway (1942–52); Panama City, Panama (1952–59)
- Builder: Sir J Laing & Sons Ltd
- Yard number: 738
- Launched: 10 September 1941
- Completed: December 1941
- Maiden voyage: 15 December 1941
- Out of service: 27 July 1959
- Identification: United Kingdom Official Number 169002 (1941–41); Code Letters LNAK (1942-46); Code Letters LLMO (1946-52)
- Fate: Scrapped

General characteristics
- Class & type: Tanker
- Tonnage: 9,813 GRT; 5,742 NRT; 14,840 DWT
- Length: 484 ft 0 in (147.52 m)
- Beam: 68 ft 3 in (20.80 m)
- Depth: 36 ft 1 in (11.00 m)
- Propulsion: Triple expansion steam engine (1941-49); Diesel engine (1949-59)
- Speed: 10.5 knots (19.4 km/h)
- Armament: 1 × 4-inch or 4.7 inch gun; 1 × Bofors gun; 6 × machine guns (Norholm)

Norholm was a 9,813 GRT tanker that was built in 1942 as Empire Druid by Sir J Laing & Sons Ltd, Sunderland, Co Durham, United Kingdom for the Ministry of War Transport (MoWT). In 1942, she was transferred to the Norwegian Government and renamed Norholm. She was sold into merchant service in 1946, and renamed Haukefjell. Fitted with a new engine in 1949, she was sold to Panama in 1952 and renamed Bluewater. She served until 1959, when she was scrapped in Japan.

== Description ==
The ship was built in 1942 by Sir J Laing & Sons Ltd, Sunderland. She was yard number 738.

The ship was 484 feet 0 inches (147.52 m) long, with a beam of 68 feet 3 inches (20.80 m). She had a depth of 36 feet 1 inch (11.00 m). She was assessed at 9,813 GRT, 5,782 NRT. Her DWT was 14,840.

As built, the ship was propelled by a 414 nhp triple expansion steam engine, which had cylinders of 27 inches (69 cm), 44 inches (110 cm) and 76 inches (190 cm) diameter by 51 inches (130 cm) stroke. The engine was built by North East Marine Engine (1938) Co Ltd, Newcastle upon Tyne. It drove a single screw propeller and could propel the ship at 10.5 knots (19.4 km/h).

== History ==
=== World War II ===
Empire Druid was launched on 24 September 1942 and completed in November. The United Kingdom Official Number 169002 was allocated.

Empire Druid was towed from Sunderland to Newcastle upon Tyne on 5 November 1941. She made her maiden voyage on 15 December when she joined Convoy FN 578, which had departed from Southend, Essex the previous day and arrived at Methil, Fife on 16 December. She then joined Convoy EN 20, which departed on 17 December and arrived at Oban, Argyllshire on 20 December. Empire Druid was in ballast for this voyage. She left the convoy at Loch Ewe on 19 December and then sailed to Aruba, Netherlands Antilles, arriving on 8 January 1942.

Empire Druid departed from Aruba on 9 January 1942 for Halifax, Nova Scotia, Canada, arriving on 18 January. She then joined Convoy HX 171, which departed on 20 January and arrived at Liverpool, Lancashire on 1 February. She was carrying a cargo of petrol. Empire Druid then sailed to the Belfast Lough to join Convoy BB 132, which sailed on 2 February and arrived at Milford Haven, Pembrokeshire the next day. She then laid in the Barry Roads until 5 February, before proceeding to Avonmouth, Somerset.

Empire Druid departed from Avonmouth on 11 February for Milford Haven, arriving the next day and departing the day after to join Convoy ON 67, which departed from Liverpool on 14 February and arrived at Halifax on 1 March. Her destination was Port Arthur, Texas, United States, which was reached via Key West, Florida on 9 March. Empire Druid departed from Port Arthur on 11 March for Halifax, arriving on 26 March. She then joined Convoy HX 182, which departed on 27 March and arrived at Liverpool on 9 April. She was carrying a cargo of petrol. On 14 April, she was drydocked at Birkenhead, Cheshire.

On 25 April, Empire Druid was transferred to the Norwegian Government and renamed Norholm. The Code Letters LNAK were allocated and her port of registry was changed to Oslo. She was placed under the management of Nortraship. Norholm was a member of Convoy OS 67, which departed from Liverpool on 2 May and arrived at Freetown, Sierra Leone on 19 May. She was in ballast and bound for Curaçao, Netherlands Antilles. Armament consisted a 4-inch or 4.7-in gun, a Bofors gun and six machine guns. Norholm detached from the convoy and arrived at Trinidad on 20 May. She departed for Aruba three days later, arriving on 25 May and departing four days later for Curaçao, arriving that day, 29 May. Norholm was a member of Convoy OT 5, which departed from Curaçao on 1 June and arrived at Trinidad on 4 June. She then sailed to Freetown, arriving on 17 June. Norholm was a member of Convoy SL 114, which departed from Freetown on 25 June and arrived at Liverpool on 17 July. She was carrying a cargo of kerosene and petrol. She left the convoy at the Belfast Lough on 16 July, joining Convoy BB 199, which departed on 17 July and arrived at Milford Haven the next day. Her destination was Avonmouth, where she arrived on 18 July.

Norholm departed form Avonmouth on 28 July for Milford Haven, arriving the next day and departing on 30 July to join Convoy ON 117, which departed from Liverpool on 31 July and dispersed at sea on 15 August. She sailed to Halifax to join Convoy HA 4, which departed on 19 August and arrived at Curaçao on 28 August. Norholm was a member of Convoy AH 3, which departed from Curaçao on 2 September and arrived at Halifax on 12 September. She then joined Convoy HX 207, which departed on 13 September and arrived at Liverpool on 25 September. Norholm was carrying a cargo of petrol. She left the convoy at the Belfast Lough on 24 September in order to join convoy BB 223, which departed the next day and arrived at Milford Haven on 26 September. Her destination was Avonmouth, where she arrived that day.

Norholm departed from Avonmouth on 6 October for Milford Haven, arriving the next day and departing a day later to join Convoy ON 137, which departed from Liverpool on 9 October and arrived at New York, United States on 29 October. She then joined Convoy NG 318, which departed on 31 October and arrived at Guantanamo Bay, Cuba on 7 November. Norholm then joined Convoy GAT 20, which departed that day and arrived at Trinidad on 12 November. She left the convoy at Curaçao, arriving on 10 November. She departed on 12 November, joining Convoy TAG 20, which had departed from Trinidad on 10 November and arrived at Guantanamo Bay on 15 November. Norholm was a member of Convoy GN 20, which departed on 16 November and arrived at New York on 23 November. She may have been due to join Convoy HX 217, which departed from New York on 27 November and arrived at Liverpool on 14 December. She sailed with Convoy HX 218, which departed on 5 December and arrived at Liverpool on 21 December.

Norholm was a member of Convoy ON 157, which departed from Liverpool on 27 December and arrived at New York on 15 January 1943. Having loaded a cargo of oil and paraffin, she joined Convoy HX 227, which departed on 18 February and arrived at Liverpool on 6 March. She left the convoy at the Belfast Lough on 5 March to join Convoy BB267, which departed that day and arrived at Milford Haven two days later. Her destination was Avonmouth, where she arrived on 7 March.

Norholm departed from Avonmouth on 10 March for the Barry Roads, arriving the next day and joining Convoy WP 307, of which she was the only merchant ship. HMS Melbreak and HMS Tanatside had departed from Milford Haven on 11 March and arrived at Portsmouth, Hampshire on 13 March. Norholm left the convoy at Falmouth, Cornwall on 12 March. She departed on 3 April for Milford Haven, arriving the next day and departing the day after that to join Convoy ON 177, which departed from Liverpool on 6 April and arrived at New York on 23 April. Laden with a cargo of avgas, she returned with Convoy HX 237, which departed on 1 May and arrived at Liverpool on 17 May. Norholm left the convoy at the Belfast Lough on 16 May to join Convoy BB 290, which departed that day and arrived at Milford Haven on 18 May. Her destination was Avonmouth, where she arrived that day.

Norholm departed from Avonmouth on 22 May for Milford Haven, from where she departed the next day to join Convoy ON 186, which departed from Liverpool on 24 May and arrived at New York on 7 June. She returned with Convoy HX 244, which departed on 15 June and arrived at Liverpool on 30 June. Norholm was carrying a cargo of petrol bound for Avonmouth. she left the convoy at the Belfast Lough on 29 June, reaching Avonmouth on 1 July via Convoy BB 304,

Norholm departed from Avonmouth on 8 June to join Convoy ON 192, which departed from Liverpool on 9 July and arrived at New York on 22 July. Having loaded a cargo of petrol, she departed on 14 August as a member of Convoy HX 252, which arrived at Liverpool on 28 August. She left the convoy on 27 August for Loch Ewe, arriving the next day and then sailing to Southend via convoys WN 472A and FS 1210. She arrived on 4 September.

Norholm departed from Southend on 12 September for Loch Ewe, which was reached on 16 September via convoys FN 1124 and EN 281. She then joined Convoy ON 203, which departed from Liverpool on 22 September and arrived at New York on 10 October. Having loaded a cargo of petrol, she returned with Convoy HX 263, which departed on 24 October and arrived at Liverpool on 8 November. She sailed on to Milford Haven, arriving on 8 November.

Norholm departed from Milford Haven on 12 November to join Convoy ON 211, which departed from Liverpool on 13 November and arrived at New York on 29 November. She departed on 2 December for Philadelphia, Pennsylvania, returning to New York on 5 December. Laden with petrol, she joined Convoy HX 270, which departed on 10 December and arrived at Liverpool on 26 December.

Norholm was a member of Convoy ON 219, which departed from Liverpool on 8 January 1944 and arrived at New York on 27 January. She departed from New York on 1 February for the Hampton Roads, Virginia. She then joined Convoy UGS 32, which departed on 3 February and arrived at Port Said, Egypt on 1 March. Norholm was bound for Algiers, Algeria, where she arrived on 21 February. She departed on 27 February to join Convoy KMS 42, which had departed from Gibraltar on 25 February and arrived at Port Said on 6 March. She left the convoy at Augusta, Italy, on 2 March, joining Convoy AH 28, which departed that day and arrived at Bari on 4 March. Norholm left the convoy at Taranto on 3 March. She departed on 9 March to join Convoy HA 29, which had departed from Bari that day and arrived at Augusta two days later. She departed on 15 March to join Convoy MKS 43, which had departed from Port Said on 10 March and arrived at Gibraltar on 22 March. She left the convoy at Algiers, on 20 March. Norholm sailed on 24 March, joining Convoy GUS 34, which had departed from Port Said on 15 March and arrived at the Hampton Roads on 14 April. Her destination was New York, where she arrived that day. Carrying a cargo of petrol, she departed on 18 April as a member of Convoy HX 288, which arrived at Liverpool on 4 May. Her destination was Swansea, Glamorgan, where she arrived on 5 May.

Norholm departed from Swansea on 10 May and sailed to the Belfast Lough, from where she departed on 12 May to join Convoy ON 236, which had departed from Liverpool the previous day and arrived at New York on 27 May. She departed from New York on 10 June for the Hampton Roads, where she joined Convoy UGS 45, which departed on 12 June and arrived at Port Said on 7 July. Norholm left the convoy at Augusta, arriving on 3 July. She then joined Convoy AH 53, which departed on 5 July and arrived at Bari two days later. She left the convoy at Brindisi that day and sailed to Bari two days later. Norholm was a member of Convoy HA 54A, which departed from Bari on 17 July and arrived at Augusta the next day. She then joined Convoy GUS 46, which had departed from Port Said on 14 July and arrived at the Hampton Roads on 8 August. Her destination was New York, where she arrived that day.

Norholm departed from New York on 11 August for the Hampton Roads. She then joined Convoy UGS 51, which departed on 13 August and arrived at Port Said on 8 September. She left the convoy at Augusta, arriving on 4 September and departing two days later to join Convoy GUS 51, which had departed from Port Said on 2 September and arrived at the Hampton Roads on 28 September. She arrived at New York later that day. Norholm departed from New York on 11 October to join Convoy UGS 57, which departed from the Hampton Roads on 12 October and arrived at Port Said on 9 November. She left the convoy at Augusta, on 4 November, joining Convoy AH 77, which arrived at Bari two days later. She then sailed to Brindisi, arriving later that day before returning to Bari. Norholm was a member of Convoy HA 78, which departed on 11 November and arrived at Augusta two days later. She then sailed to Oran, Algeria, where she arrived on 17 November. She was a member of Convoy GUS 59, which departed on 24 November and arrived at the Hampton Roads on 10 December. She arrived at New York later that day.

Norholm departed from New York on 19 December to join Convoy UGS 64, which departed from the Hampton Roads that day and arrived at Gibraltar on 4 January 1945. She passed Gibraltar and sailed on to Augusta, arriving on 8 January. She sailed on 17 January for Brindisi, arriving the next day and departing on 26 January for Bari, where she arrived that day. On 9 February, Norholm departed for Algiers, arriving four days later. She departed from Algiers on 7 March and sailed to Oran, arriving on 15 March. Norholm was a member of Convoy GUS 78, which departed from Oran on 18 March and arrived at the Hampton Roads on 4 April. Her destination was Baltimore, Maryland, where she arrived on 4 April. She departed from Baltimore on 26 April for the Hampton Roads, from where she departed as a member of Convoy UGS 89, which departed on 28 April.

=== Post-war ===
Convoy UGS 89 dispersed at sea on 12 May. Norholm arrived at Oran on 22 May, departing that day for Port Said, where she arrived on 28 May. She then made a return voyage to Haifa, Palestine, arriving back at Port Said on 31 May. She then sailed to Suez, from where she departed on 3 June for Abadan, Iran, arriving on 15 June and departing six days later for Cochin, India, where she arrived on 29 June. Norholm departed from Cochin on 7 July for Abadan, arriving on 15 July. She then made a round trip to Karachi, India, returning to Abadan on 29 July and departing three days later for Colombo, Ceylon, which was reached on 11 August. Norholm sailed that day for the Palk Strait, in the Bay of Bengal, where she anchored from 13–17 August before proceeding to Chittagong, arriving on 21 August.

Norholm arrived at Colombo on 30 August and sailed that day for Abadan, arriving on 8 September. She departed two days later for Melbourne, Victoria, Australia, arriving on 9 October. She departed a week later for Hobart, Tasmania, arriving on 11 October.

In 1946, Norholm was sold to A/S Falkefjell, Oslo and was renamed Haukefjell. She was operated under the management of Olsen & Ugelstad. Her Code Letters were changed to LLMO. In 1949, Haukefjell was re-engined. One of the two diesel engines from Wega was installed. The other engine was installed in Kollgrim. The engine was a 5,300 bhp 10-cylinder engine, made by Fiat.

In 1952, Haukefjell was sold to Compagnia Atlantica Pacifica SA, Panama and renamed Bluewater. She was operated under the management of Tidewater Commercial Co Inc. Baltimore, Maryland, United States, serving until 1959. Bluewater arrived on 27 July 1959 at Osaka, Japan for scrapping.
