= USS Nicholson (DD-442) =

Gleaves-class destroyer

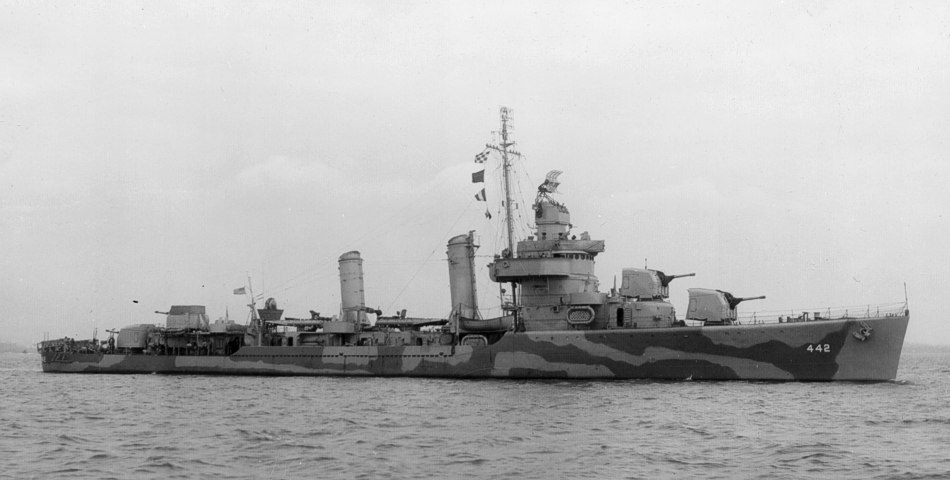
- USS Nicholson (DD-442) off Boston in April 1942.

History

United States
- Name: Nicholson
- Builder: Boston Navy Yard
- Laid down: 1 November 1939
- Launched: 31 May 1940
- Commissioned: 3 June 1941
- Decommissioned: 15 January 1951
- Honors and awards: 10 battle stars
- Fate: Transferred to Italy, 15 January 1951
- Stricken: 22 January 1951

Italy
- Name: Aviere
- Acquired: 15 January 1951
- Stricken: 1975
- Fate: Sunk as a target, 1 September 1977

General characteristics
- Class & type: Gleaves-class destroyer; Artigliere-class destroyer
- Displacement: 1,630 tons
- Length: 348 ft 4 in (106.17 m)
- Beam: 36 ft 1 in (11.00 m)
- Draft: 13 ft 2 in (4.01 m)
- Propulsion: 50,000 shp (37,000 kW); 4 boilers; 2 propellers
- Speed: 35 knots (65 km/h)
- Range: 6,500 nmi (12,000 km; 7,500 mi) at 12 kn (22 km/h; 14 mph)
- Complement: 16 officers, 260 enlisted
- Armament: 4 × 5 in (127 mm) DP guns, 6 × 0.5 in (12.7 mm) guns, 10 × 21 in (533 mm) torpedo tubes, 2 × depth charge projectors, 1 × depth charge tracks

USS Nicholson (DD-442), a Gleaves-class destroyer, was the third ship of the United States Navy to be named for the Nicholson family, which was prominent in the early history of the Navy. The destroyer saw service during World War II in the Atlantic, Mediterranean and Pacific theaters. Following the war, the ship was placed in reserve and used as a training ship. In 1951, the destroyer was transferred to Italy and renamed Aviere. In service with the Marina Militare until 1975, Aviere was sunk as a target ship in 1975.

== Construction and career ==
Nicholson was laid down on 1 November 1939 by Boston Naval Shipyard. The ship was launched on 31 May 1940; sponsored by Mrs. S. A. Bathriek, a great-granddaughter of Samuel Nicholson (1743–1811). The destroyer was commissioned on 3 June 1941.

After a shakedown cruise in the eastern Atlantic, Nicholson escorted convoys through the U-boat-infested North Atlantic first from Boston to Newfoundland and then to Scotland and England until fall 1942. In a brief training period off the Virginia coast, she prepared for the Casablanca invasion, but a turbine casualty prevented her participation in the initial landings. She arrived four days later, 12 November, to assist in the consolidation of the beachhead and to patrol. She took part in the Bizerte campaign and the initial assaults on Salerno, coming under heavy air attack from the Luftwaffe at both Bizerte and Salerno.

=== Convoys escorted ===
Convoy	Escort Group	Dates	Notes
HX 160		17–25 Nov 1941	from Newfoundland to Iceland prior to US declaration of war
ON 41		4–10 Dec 1941	from Iceland to Newfoundland; war declared during convoy
HX 173		3–10 Feb 1942	from Newfoundland to Iceland
ON 67		19–28 Feb 1942	from Iceland to Newfoundland
AT 17		1–12 July 1942	troopships from New York City to Firth of Clyde
AT 18		6–17 Aug 1942	troopships from New York City to Firth of Clyde

=== Pacific service ===
After five months in the Mediterranean, Nicholson returned to the United States for overhaul in preparation for Pacific deployment, for which she sailed from Boston early in January 1944. When she reached New Guinea in February, she was assigned to escort LSTs in the Cape Gloucester campaign, already under way.

Throughout the long New Guinea campaign, a matter of successive assaults on coastal points and nearby islands, Nicholson gave gunfire support to troops ashore. She had similar duty in the Admiralties; when, during the conquest of Seeadler Harbor, she was assigned to draw fire from an enemy battery on Hauwei Island. Here she was hit by a 4-inch (102 mm) shell which struck in No. 2 ammunition handling room, killing three and wounding four. She eliminated the enemy position.

In August 1944 Nicholson joined the 3rd Fleet in the Marshalls. She screened fast carriers in raids on the Bonins, Formosa, and the Philippines, supporting the invasion of the Palaus and the neutralization of Yap. Returning to the Philippines, her group assisted the 7th Fleet during the invasion of Leyte and the decisive Battle for Leyte Gulf, from which Nicholson sailed for a Seattle overhaul.

Returning to the western Pacific in February 1945, Nicholson escorted ships passing between Guam and Ulithi, and arrived off Okinawa for its invasion late in March. Serving in the exposed radar picket line, Nicholson came through untouched by kamikazes, but rescued survivors from stricken destroyers Little and Morrison.

Rejoining the 3rd Fleet for the final air operations against the Japanese home islands, Nicholson was off Honshū at the war's end. She entered Sagami Wan on 29 August and Tokyo Bay on 15 September. Returning to San Diego on 6 November, she sailed for Panama and Charleston, South Carolina, arriving on 23 November to join the Atlantic Reserve Fleet. She decommissioned on 26 February 1946 and was assigned as a Naval Reserve training ship in the 3d Naval District on 30 November 1948.

Nicholson received 10 battle stars for World War II service.

== Post-war service ==
While serving as reserve training ship at the Brooklyn Navy Yard, Nicholson served as the backdrop for the big-screen musical On the Town starring Frank Sinatra, Gene Kelly, Vera Ellen, Ann Miller and Betty Garret. The ship was shown in the beginning of the movie and also in the last scene.

Nicholson was recommissioned on 17 July 1950, then decommissioned once more and transferred to the Italian Navy 15 January 1951.

== Aviere (D 554) ==
Nicholson was sold to the Italian Navy 15 January 1951 and renamed Aviere. She was converted to an experimental gun ship in 1970. She was stricken and sunk as a target in 1975.
