= George F. Brady =

United States Navy Medal of Honor recipient

- Born: September 7, 1867; Ireland
- Died: November 6, 1903 (aged 36); Portsmouth, New Hampshire
- Burial place: Island Cemetery, Newport, Rhode Island
- Military career
- Allegiance: United States of America
- Branch: United States Navy
- Service years: 1884–1903
- Rank: Chief Gunner's Mate
- Unit: USS Winslow (TB-5)
- Conflicts: Spanish–American War
- Awards: Medal of Honor; Navy Good Conduct Medal; Sampson Medal; Spanish Campaign Medal

George F. Brady (real name George Patrick Brady, September 7, 1867 – November 6, 1903) was a sailor in the United States Navy who received the Medal of Honor for his heroic actions during the Spanish–American War.

== Biography ==
George Patrick Brady was born on September 7, 1867, in Ireland and enlisted in the United States Navy at the age of 17 on November 30, 1884. He had risen to the rank of Chief Gunner's Mate by the time of the Spanish–American War in 1898.

Brady was aboard the torpedo boat USS Winslow (TB-5) during the Battle of Cardenas on May 11, 1898, off the coast of Cuba. During the battle, the Winslow was damaged by Spanish gunfire. Brady assisted in sustaining fire on the Spanish, made efforts to repair the ship's steering gear and helped maintain its watertight integrity to prevent it from sinking. For his heroism he was awarded the Medal of Honor by the Navy on September 3, 1899.

In addition to being awarded the Medal of Honor, he was also promoted to the warrant officer rank of Gunner on June 27, 1898, in recognition of his heroism. His first assignment following his promotion was to the armored cruiser USS New York. He was reassigned to the Naval Torpedo Station in Newport, Rhode Island, on 21 November 1900.

Brady killed himself while serving on board the U.S.S. Monongahela at the Portsmouth Navy Yard in Kittery, Maine, on November 6, 1903. He stated shortly before his suicide that "the pain was unbearable", but it is unclear if his pain was physical or emotional.

He was buried in the Island Cemetery in Newport, Rhode Island, where his wife and children lived. As his tombstone did not indicate that he had received the Medal of Honor, this fact was not discovered until January 2013 when Charles Mogayzel of Pawtucket, Rhode Island, was able to find Brady's burial site. Representatives of the U.S. Navy and local veterans organizations dedicated a Medal of Honor grave marker at Brady's grave on Memorial Day later that year.

His name in records pertaining to the Medal of Honor is "George F. Brady", and the name on his tombstone is "George P. Brady". The reason for this discrepancy is probably that his name was mis-transcribed when his Medal of Honor citation was written.

== Awards ==
- Medal of Honor
- Navy Good Conduct Medal
- Sampson Medal
- Spanish Campaign Medal (posthumous)

=== Medal of Honor citation ===
Rank and organization: Chief Gunner's Mate, U.S. Navy. Born: 7 September 1867, Ireland. Accredited to: New York. G.O. No.: 497, September 3, 1898.

=== Citation ===
Chief gunner's mate on board the torpedo boat Winslow, for gallant and conspicuous conduct in the action at Cardenas, Cuba, May 11, 1898. Brady's energy in assisting to sustain fire, his efforts to repair the steering gear under fire, and his promptness in maintaining closed watertight doors and hatches, was largely instrumental in saving the vessel.

== See also ==
- List of Medal of Honor recipients for the Spanish–American War
