= SS Gulfstate =

Tanker and shipwreck

Coordinates: 24.43376°N 80.29976°W

History

United States
- Name: Gulfstate
- Owner: Gulf Oil
- Operator: War Shipping Administration
- Builder: Bethlehem Steel
- Launched: 1920
- Fate: Sank 1943

General characteristics
- Type: Tanker
- Tonnage: 6,882 GRT
- Length: 435 ft (133 m)
- Beam: 56 ft (17 m)
- Depth: 33 ft (10 m)

SS Gulfstate was an American oil tanker that was torpedoed and sunk during World War II. On April 3, 1943, the German submarine U-155 sunk the ship in the Atlantic Ocean 50 nautical miles (93 km; 58 mi) southeast of Marathon Key, Florida. Forty-three of the 61 crew were lost. The survivors were discovered by a United States Navy blimp and were rescued by a United States Coast Guard aircraft with the assistance of the USS Noa. The location of the sunken vessel is unknown but it has been identified as a potential source of oil pollution by the National Oceanic and Atmospheric Administration's Remediation of Underwater Legacy Environmental Threats (RULET) project.

== History ==
The steam tanker was built by Bethlehem Steel in Alameda in 1920. It was known as the Halway. The vessel was purchased in 1923 and renamed Gulfstate. The ship's nine cargo tanks were divided by an oil-tight longitudinal bulkhead.

=== World War II sinking ===
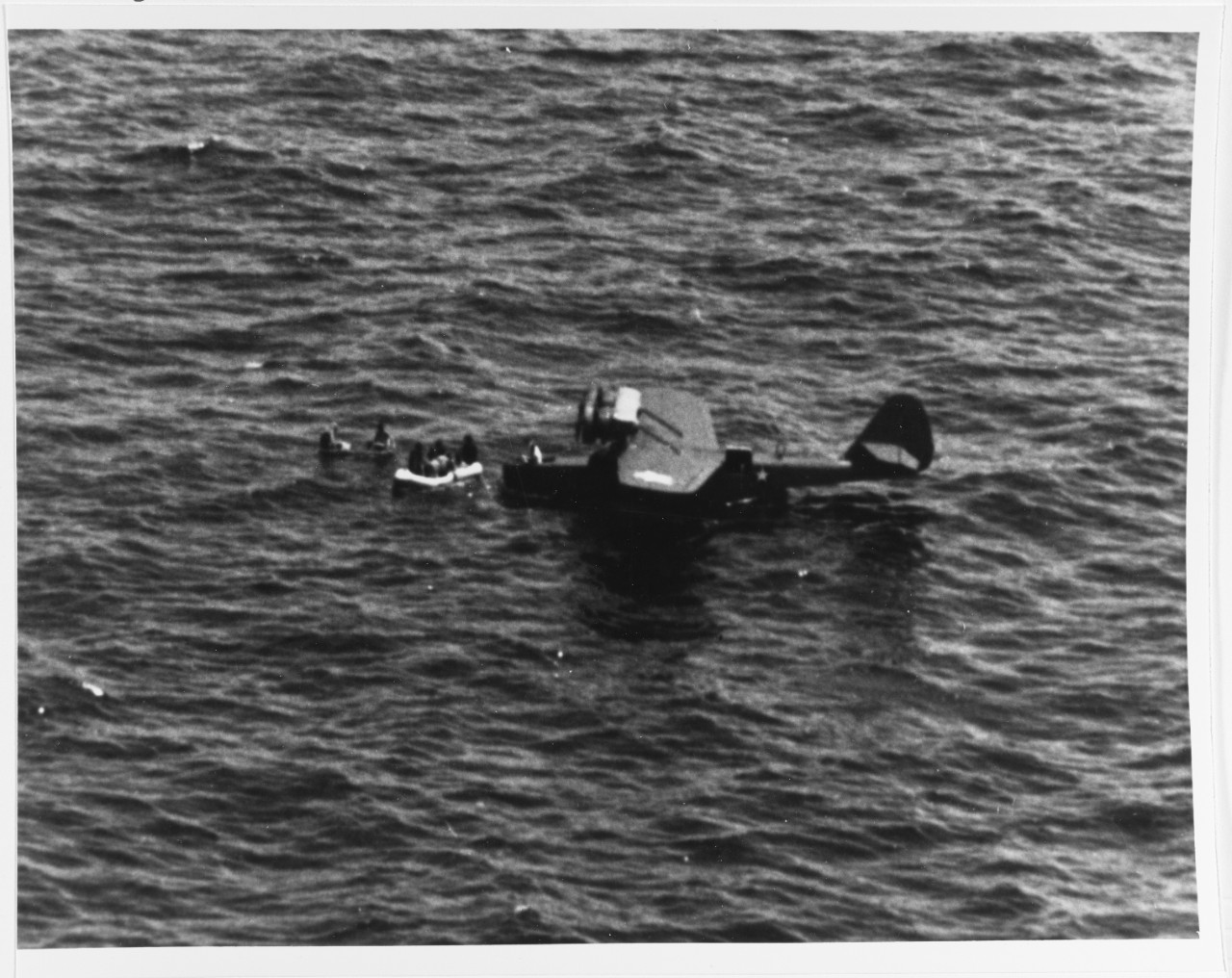
Survivors of the SS Gulfstate

On April 3, 1943, the Gulfstate was in the Gulf of Mexico, steaming an unescorted, nonevasive course at 10.5 knots (19.4 km/h; 12.1 mph) from Corpus Christi, Texas, to Portland, Maine, under Master James Frank Harrell. Just after 9:00 a.m., it was struck by two torpedoes by the German U-boat U-155, approximately 50 miles (80 km) southeast of Marathon Key, Florida. The Gulfstate sank. Eight officers, 26 crewmen and nine armed guards were killed. The survivors were discovered by a United States Navy blimp and were rescued by a United States Coast Guard aircraft with the assistance of the destroyer USS Noa. Three survivors were rescued and transferred to the Noa for medical treatment. The US Navy patrol yacht YP-351 rescued the 15 remaining members of the crew and transported them to Key West.

An effort by the Sea Frontier to track the U-boat, captained by Adolf Piening, was unsuccessful.

== Environmental concerns ==
At the time of its sinking, the Gulfstate was carrying 78,000 barrels of high-grade crude oil. In 2013, the National Oceanic and Atmospheric Administration's Remediation of Underwater Legacy Environmental Threats (RULET) project identified the Gulfstate as a sunken vessel that is a potential source of oil pollution. It was listed as the project's top priority for assessment and salvage operations.

== See also ==
- List of shipwrecks in April 1943
