= SS Empire Arnold =

World War II merchant ship of the United Kingdom

History
- Name: Empire Arnold
- Owner: Ministry of War Transport
- Operator: Sir R Ropner & Co Ltd
- Port of registry: (United Kingdom) West Hartlepool
- Builder: William Gray & Co. Ltd., West Hartlepool
- Yard number: 1127
- Launched: 6 March 1942
- Completed: May 1942
- Out of service: 4 August 1942
- Identification: UK Official Number 168939; Code letters BDSV
- Fate: Torpedoed and sunk, 4 August 1942

General characteristics
- Tonnage: 7,045 GRT
- Length: 431 ft 5 in (131.50 m)
- Beam: 56 ft 3 in (17.15 m)
- Depth: 35 ft 2 in (10.72 m)
- Propulsion: 1 × triple expansion steam engine (W Gray & Co) 510 hp (380 kW)
- Complement: 51 crew (plus 8 DEMS gunners)

Location of the sinking of Empire Arnold.

Empire Arnold was a 7,045-ton British cargo ship which was built in 1942 for the Ministry of War Transport. Launched in March and completed in May, she was torpedoed and sunk in the Caribbean Sea by the German submarine U-155 on 4 August 1942 during World War II.

== History ==
Empire Arnold was built by William Gray & Co. Ltd., West Hartlepool. She was yard number 1127 and launched on 6 March 1942 and completed in May 1942. Empire Arnold was built for the Ministry of War Transport and managed by Sir R Ropner & Co Ltd.

Empire Arnold was a member of Convoy ON 99, which sailed from Liverpool on 29 May 1942 and arrived in Boston on 12 June. Empire Arnold was in ballast for this journey. On 11 June, Empire Arnold lost the convoy in thick fog at 05:30, regaining the convoy at 17:00.

== Sinking ==
On 4 August 1942, Empire Arnold was a member of Convoy EF 6, which was sailing from New York via Trinidad and Cape Town and then through the Suez Canal to Alexandria. She was carrying 10,000 tons of cargo including aircraft and tanks. At 16:15 hrs CET, Empire Arnold was torpedoed and sunk in the Atlantic off the South American coast (10°45′N 52°30′W) by U-155, captained by Adolf Piening. Nine crew members were killed and the captain, Frederick Tate, was taken prisoner. The 49 surviving crew members and two passengers were rescued by the Norwegian ship SS Dalvanger. They were landed in Georgetown, British Guiana on 14 August. Tate was landed at Lorient on 15 September and interned at Milag Nord POW camp, Westertimke. During his time as a POW, Tate was a signatory to a document praising the Pilots of the Panama Canal system for their efficiency, courtesy and reliability in assisting ships passing through the canal. Those lost on Empire Arnold are commemorated at the Tower Hill Memorial, London.

== Official number and code letters ==
Official Numbers were a forerunner to IMO Numbers.

Empire Arnold had the UK Official Number 168939 and used the Code Letters BDSV.
