= AK-27 =

AK-27 or AK27 may refer to:

- Alexei Kovalev, ice hockey player
- USS Almaack (AK-27), US Navy warship
- A formulation of red fuming nitric acid rocket fuel
