= SS Executor =

SS Executor may refer to one of these ships built for or owned by American Export Lines:

- SS Executor (1940) (MC hull number 104, Type C3-E), built by Bethlehem Shipbuilding (Quincy, Massachusetts); acquired by the United States Navy as cargo ship USS Almaack (AKA-10); sold for commercial service in 1946; scrapped in 1970
- SS Executor (1945) (MC hull number 2252, Type C3-S-A3), built by Bethlehem Sparrows Point Shipyard; delivered September 1945; scrapped in 1976
