= SS Sylvan Arrow =

Steam tanker built in 1917–1918

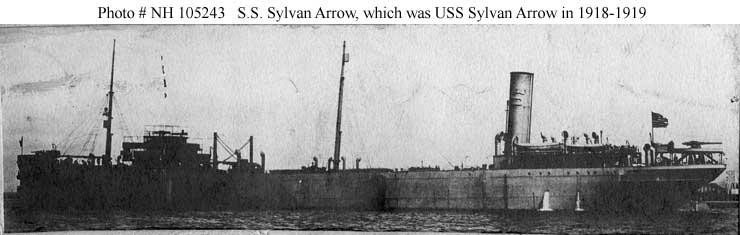
- SS Sylvan Arrow in early 1918, prior to her U.S. Navy service.

History

United States
- Name: Sylvan Arrow
- Owner: Standard Oil Co. (1918–1930); Socony-Vacuum Oil Co. (1930–1942)
- Operator: Standard Transportation Co. (1918–1930); Standard-Vacuum Transportation Co. (1931–1933); Socony-Vacuum Oil Co. (1934–1940); Brilliant Transportation Corp., S.A. (1940–1942)
- Builder: New York Shipbuilding Co., Camden
- Cost: US$929,281.32
- Yard number: 174
- Laid down: 22 March 1917
- Launched: 16 October 1917
- Sponsored by: Mrs. Mary Stobo Veit
- Completed: 2 January 1918
- Commissioned: 5 January 1918
- Homeport: New York (1918–1940); Panama City (1940–1942)
- Identification: US Official Number 215840; Call sign LJKC (1918–1933); Call sign WSCX (1934–1940); Call sign HPQZ (1940–1942)
- Fate: Sank, 28 May 1942

United States
- Name: USS Sylvan Arrow
- Operator: U.S. Navy (1918–1919)
- Acquired: 15 July 1918
- Commissioned: 19 July 1918
- Decommissioned: 21 January 1919
- Fate: Returned to owners 21 January 1919

General characteristics
- Class & type: Arrow-class oil tanker
- Tonnage: 7,797 GRT; 4,858 NRT; 12,582 DWT
- Displacement: 18,610 tons (normal)
- Length: 467.6 ft (142.5 m)
- Beam: 62.7 ft (19.1 m)
- Draft: 27 ft 7 in (8.41 m) (mean)
- Depth: 32.0 ft (9.8 m)
- Installed power: 568 nhp, 3,300 ihp (2,500 kW)
- Propulsion: New York Shipbuilding Co. 4-cylinder quadruple expansion
- Speed: 11 knots (20 km/h; 13 mph)
- Armament: During WWI; 1 × 5 in (127 mm) naval gun; 1 × 3 in (76 mm) naval gun

SS Sylvan Arrow was a steam-powered Arrow-class oil tanker built in 1917–1918 by New York Shipbuilding Co. of Camden for Standard Oil Company, with the intention of transporting oil and petroleum products between United States and ports in the Far East. The ship was briefly requisitioned by the US Government during World War I but returned to commercial service in early 1919.

== Design and construction ==
Late in 1915 Standard Oil placed an order for four tankers of approximately 12,500 deadweight, to expand their oil carrying business. A contract for these vessels was awarded to the New York Shipbuilding Co. and the ship was laid down at the shipbuilder's yard in Camden (yard number 174) on 22 March 1917, and launched on 16 October 1917, with Mrs. Mary Stobo Veit, wife of Richard C. Veit, vice-president of Standard Oil Company, serving as the sponsor. The ship was built on the Isherwood principle of longitudinal framing providing extra strength to the body of the vessel, had two main decks and a shelter deck and had electric lights installed along them. The tanker had a cargo pump room located amidships, and twenty main and ten summer tanks constructed throughout the vessel with a total capacity to carry 3,950,000 US gallons of oil.

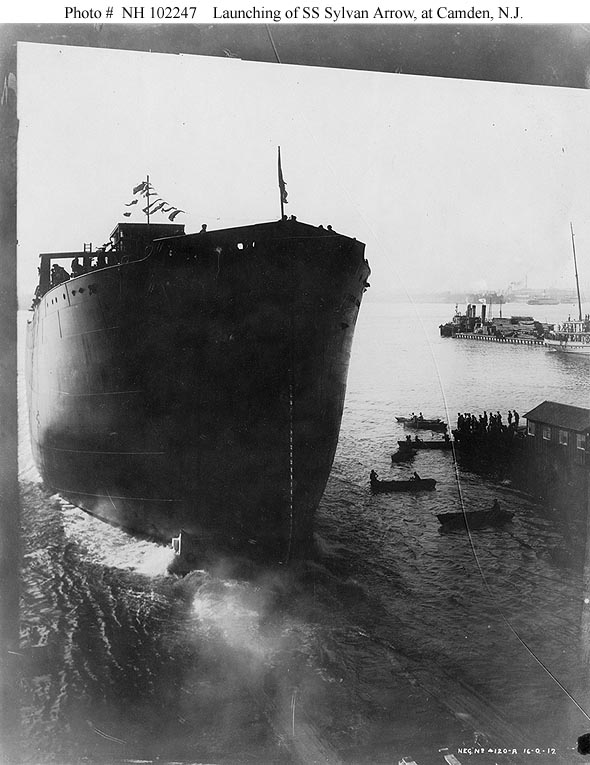
The launch of SS Sylvan Arrow on October 16, 1917.

On August 3, 1917, while still under construction at the shipbuilder's yard, she along with her sister-ship Broad Arrow were requisitioned by the US Government for war purposes. The tanker was launched 92% complete and had to be refitted according to USSB requirements which delayed her delivery. She was completed and delivered to the USSB on January 2, 1918, and immediately sold back to Standard Oil at par value, and chartered by the U.S. government for the duration of the war.

As built, the ship was 467.6 feet (142.5 m) long (between perpendiculars) and 62.7 feet (19.1 m) abeam, and had a depth of 32.0 feet (9.8 m). Sylvan Arrow was assessed at 7,797 GRT and 4,858 NRT and had deadweight of approximately 12,582. The vessel had a steel hull, and a single 568 Nhp surface-condensing quadruple expansion steam engine, with cylinders of 24-inch (61 cm), 35-inch (89 cm), 51-inch (130 cm) and 75-inch (190 cm) diameter with a 51-inch (130 cm) stroke, that drove a single screw propeller and moved the ship at up to 11 knots (13 mph; 20 km/h). The steam for the engine was supplied by three single-ended Scotch boilers fitted for both coal and oil fuel.

== Operational history ==
=== United States Navy service during World War I ===
Upon completion and delivery the ship was inspected by the U.S. Navy in the 3rd Naval District for possible World War I Navy service. While still under government control since delivery, the tanker was not used for war service until July 1918. The vessel arrived at New York City on 15 July 1918, where she was formally taken over by the Navy. The tanker was assigned the naval registry Identification Number (Id. No.) 2150 and was commissioned on 19 July 1918 as USS Sylvan Arrow and transferred to the Naval Overseas Transportation Service.

Sylvan Arrow departed New York on 28 July 1918 for her first trip under Navy control carrying a cargo of fuel oil and seaplanes to Devonport. After safely reaching her destination and unloading, the ship left England for her return journey on 17 August 1918. The vessel conducted two more trips to Europe, one to Brest in September 1918, and the third one to Sheerness, where she delivered cargo on 11 November 1918, the day the Armistice with Germany that ended the war was signed. Sylvan Arrow then proceeded back to United States where upon arrival she was demobilized after arriving in New York but remained under government control until she was decommissioned on 21 January 1919 and returned to Standard Oil on the same day.

On November 29 after arriving in New York, Sylvan Arrow anchored about a ship's length to the west from British steamship W. I. Radcliffe in the anchorage grounds off Tompkinsville. About 04:00 on December 1, 1918, the wind, which up to then had been blowing out of the northwest, switched to west and increased in force. By about 05:30 the wind speed topped 50 miles per hour (80 km/h). As Sylvan Arrow was light and drew only 4 feet 6 inches forward because her forward tanks were being steamed, the tanker began to drag her anchor and to drift down upon the W. I. Radcliffe broadside on. Due to ships being very close to each other, very little could be done to prevent a collision, and Sylvan Arrow struck W. I. Radcliffe with her starboard side inflicting serious damage to the bow of the British vessel. An inquiry into the accident was held on December 26 of the same year and found Sylvan Arrow to be solely responsible for the incident. In May 1919 Wynnstay Steamship Co., owners of W. I. Radcliffe, filed a libel suit against Sylvan Arrow claiming damages in the amount of US$65,000.

=== Commercial service ===
Soon after release from the government service, Sylvan Arrow resumed her operations for Standard Oil and sailed for Beaumont to load a cargo of oil. The tanker passed through the Panama Canal on her first trip in commercial role on February 18, 1919, loaded with 10,971 tons of petroleum. The ship arrived at San Francisco on March 4 and after refueling cleared for Yokohama and Hong Kong on the same day. The vessel returned to San Francisco on May 7 and proceeded to Texas three days later to load another cargo for the Orient. The ship continued transporting petroleum between Texas and the Far Eastern ports through the end of August 1921, when due to the downturn in oil business, Sylvan Arrow together with several other Standard Oil tankers was laid up.

After revival in oil demand the tanker was repaired and returned to service at the end of January 1922, and subsequently conducted two trips to the Far East, each time carrying approximately 4,000,000 gallons of kerosene. From December 1923 through July 1924 she was chartered to carry oil for the Humble Oil and Refining Co. between Beaumont and New York and other ports in the Northeast. Following the end of the charter, the tanker left Beaumont for Calcutta on August 10, 1924 and returned to New York on January 2, 1925. The vessel did not have a set route and would sail wherever there was a demand for petroleum, so her typical schedule may have looked as following. In March 1926 Sylvan Arrow sailed with 11,150 tons of petroleum from Beaumont to Shanghai, upon her return from China she loaded 11,200 tons of gasoline in San Pedro in May and delivered her cargo to Boston in June. From there she proceeded to Texas to load a cargo of oil for Norwegian port of Thamshavn in July. After returning to the East coast and conducting a couple of trips between Beaumont and Boston, the tanker sailed for Calcutta in October. After arriving back in San Pedro in mid December the ship loaded 65,370 barrels of fuel oil and left for Portland reaching it on December 27. Sylvan Arrow continued transporting petroleum between the United States and China in addition to carrying oil from California and Texas to the ports in the Northeast through 1930.

In September 1930 while on her way back to Los Angeles from Japan, Sylvan Arrow lost her propeller about 150 miles away from her destination, and had to be taken into tow by her sister ship Empire Arrow who brought her into port a few days later. The repairs took about a week to complete and the ship was put back into service as soon as the work was finished.

From 1931 onwards, she was moved to the inter-coastal trade, and was primarily employed in petroleum transportation from the terminals of Magnolia Petroleum Company in Beaumont to Boston, New York and Baltimore. The tanker underwent major reconditioning work which lasted two and a half months early in 1934 at the Betlehem Shipbuilding's drydock in Baltimore and again in October of the same year when she had her heating pipes installed.

During the night of January 13, 1932 Sylvan Arrow was proceeding up the Ambrose Channel on her way from Beaumont to New York with cargo of oil when she ran into a fog-bank. The tanker dropped her speed to about three knots, and was sounding fog signals. At the same time, freighter Katrina Luckenbach was sailing down the Channel on her way to San Francisco with general cargo. At 22:53 Sylvan Arrow sighted the masthead and lights of a vessel on her port bow. Due to the prevalent fog, the lights quickly disappeared from her view and remained unseen for about three minutes until they suddenly reappeared and it seemed like the oncoming freighter was heading straight for Sylvan Arrow. The tanker's engines were immediately put full speed ahead under a hard left rudder but because of the short distance between the vessels, the maneuver failed. About half a minute later the ships collided, with the bow of Katrina Luckenbach striking a glancing blow which cracked the plates on the port side of Sylvan Arrow at her No. 8 tank leading to release of some of the tanker's oil cargo. The freighter suffered damage to her stem and bow plates totaling approximately US$10,000.

In the afternoon of November 27, 1932 while en route from New York to Beaumont Sylvan Arrow sighted distress signals coming from a ship. The vessel was British schooner Edith Dawson who while on passage from Turks and Caicos Islands to Nova Scotia with a cargo of salt ran into strong northerly gale east of Jacksonville, and started leaking badly. The crew started the pumps, but the salt cargo got mixed with the water and made a slush which the pumps could not handle and failed. A lifeboat was lowered from the tanker and managed to close to the disabled ship and transfer all seven people on board. Soon after the schooner burst into flames and sunk a few hours later. Sylvan Arrow landed the crew in Beaumont upon her arrival there on December 6.

During the second half of 1939 the tanker made two trips to the West coast carrying gasoline from San Pedro to New York before returning to her usual trade carrying oil from the shipping ports of Texas and Louisiana. Starting in 1940 the ship also made several trips to Aruba and Curaçao. After the passage of the Neutrality Act in November 1939 many shipowners transferred their vessels to neutral registry to bypass the Act's limitations. On August 24, 1940, the Maritime Commission approved the sale and registry transfer for two tankers, Sylvan Arrow and Royal Arrow, to the Petroleum Shipping Company of Panama, a subsidiary of Socony-Vacuum Oil. After the register change, the tanker continued sailing on her usual route for the remainder of her career.

=== Sinking ===
In April 1942, while in Norfolk, Sylvan Arrow was requisitioned by the War Shipping Administration for war purposes. The tanker sailed to the Caribbean where she was to become part of a small convoy. On May 18, 1942, Convoy OT-1 consisting of three vessels, tankers Sylvan Arrow and Betancuria and Norwegian freighter Rapana departed Curaçao for Cape Town via Trinidad. Sylvan Arrow had a full cargo of Bunker C oil, was under command of captain Arthur J. Beck and had a crew of 38 men in addition to six armed Navy guards. The convoy was escorted by two British vessels, destroyer Havelock and corvette Lavender. On May 20 the convoy was spotted by German U-boat U-155 who at 07:21 fired two stern torpedoes at two tankers in the convoy in the approximate position 11°22′N 62°14′W. One torpedo missed, but the second one hit Sylvan Arrow amidships. The explosion blew the midship section of the main deck wide open, covering the whole ship in oil and setting her on fire. Two lifeboats were launched and manned and the remainder of the crew was rescued from the bow of the ship where they were trapped by the fire. Meanwhile, the guards manned the gun but the submarine never surfaced, and they were forced to jump overboard to avoid flames. One guard, running to the gun station was blinded by the spewing geyser of oil and ran off the oily deck, and drowned. The guards spent several hours in the water, where they survived by holding onto a large wooden plank that must have come from the hold of the ship. The guards and the crew were picked up by destroyer Barney and landed safely at Port-of-Spain. The tanker continued moving and burning, and was sighted again by U-155 in the morning of May 21, but the submarine could not deliver coup de grâce due to heavy patrol presence.

Once ashore, the crew got separated: 26 men were put on board steamer SS Robert E. Lee and safely arrived in New Orleans. Captain Beck and eleven members of the crew took part in an attempt to salvage the vessel. The search for the tanker lasted three days and she was finally located on May 26. The towing cables were connected, and a salvage tug began towing the ship, however, because of the amount of damage caused by both explosion and subsequent fire, Sylvan Arrow started to break up amidships and the towing operation had to be abandoned. The tanker eventually folded in the middle and sank at about 17:00 on May 28 in an approximate position 12°50′N 67°32′W. Captain Beck and the rest of the salvage crew were taken to Curaçao where they were able to board Dutch steamer SS Crijnssen on June 7. However, on June 10 Crijnssen was attacked and sunk by another German submarine, and the crew of Sylvan Arrow was once more separated. The captain and six other crew members ended in one of the lifeboats which eventually reached Mexican coast. The remaining five crew members ended up in another lifeboat and were picked up by the SS Lebore on her passage to Chile. On June 14 Lebore was also torpedoed and they again found themselves in the lifeboats. They were picked up three days later by destroyer Tattnall after being spotted by a patrol plane and safely landed at Cristóbal.
