= Ludwig von Friedeburg =

German sociologist and politician (1924–2010)

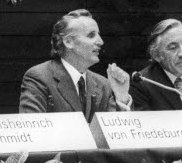
- Ludwig von Friedeburg in 1975

Minister for Education and Cultural Affairs of Hesse
- In office October 1969 – December 1974
- Preceded by: Arno Hennig
- Succeeded by: Ernst Klee

Personal details
- Born: 21 May 1924 Wilhelmshaven, Germany
- Died: 17 May 2010 (aged 85) Frankfurt am Main, Germany
- Party: Social Democratic Party of Germany (SPD)
- Spouse: Ellen Schölch
- Children: Robert (b. 1961), Christoph (b. 1974)
- Parent: Admiral Hans-Georg von Friedeburg (father)
- Occupation: Sociologist, politician
- Military career
- Allegiance: Nazi Germany
- Branch: Kriegsmarine
- Service years: 1941-45
- Rank: Leutnant zur See
- Units: U-155; U-4710
- Conflicts: World War II; Battle of the Atlantic

Ludwig-Ferdinand Heinrich Georg Friedrich von Friedeburg (21 May 1924 – 17 May 2010) was a German sociologist and Social Democratic (SPD) politician who served as Hesse’s Minister for Education and Cultural Affairs from 1969 to 1974. A leading figure in West Germany's post-war education reforms, he promoted the introduction of Integrierte Gesamtschulen (comprehensive schools) and upper-secondary reform in Hesse. Earlier, he served in the Kriegsmarine during the Second World War and, at age 20, became one of Germany's youngest U-boat commanders. After leaving politics he directed Frankfurt's Institute for Social Research from 1975 to 2001.

== Early life and family ==
Friedeburg was born in Wilhelmshaven on 21 May 1924, the elder son of Admiral Hans-Georg von Friedeburg, who became Commander-in-Chief of the Kriegsmarine in 1945.

== Military service ==
He joined the Kriegsmarine in 1941 and completed U-boat and officer training. In 1944 he commanded U-155 and later the newly-commissioned U-4710. His command of U-155 (August–November 1944) included one Atlantic patrol; U-4710 undertook no patrols before Germany's surrender.

== Education and academic career ==
After 1945 Friedeburg studied psychology, philosophy, and sociology, becoming associated with the Institute for Social Research (IfS) in Frankfurt, where he worked with Theodor W. Adorno and later habilitated in sociology. He led the Institute's empirical research department in the 1950s, held a professorship at the Free University of Berlin (1962–1966), and returned to Frankfurt as co-director of the IfS in 1966. Following his government service he became the Institute's managing director (1975–2001), taking over from Gerhard Brandt.

Around 1959, Adorno's close collaborator and ex-director of IfS Max Horkheimer sought to block the publication of Student und Politik. Eine soziologische Untersuchung zum politischen Bewusstsein Frankfurter Studenten (1961), a book Friedeburg wrote with Jürgen Habermas and three others, on the grounds that it would "encourage" the East German Communists and "play into the hands of the potential fascists at home".

Friedeburg's scholarship helped institutionalise empirical social research in post-war West Germany, notably in industrial sociology (Soziologie des Betriebsklimas, 1963), and he contributed to editions and debates surrounding Adorno's studies of authoritarianism.

== Political career ==
A member of the Social Democratic Party of Germany (SPD), Friedeburg was appointed Hesse’s Minister for Education and Cultural Affairs in October 1969 under Minister-President Albert Osswald, serving until December 1974. He prioritised equal educational opportunity, piloting and then expanding comprehensive schools (Integrierte Gesamtschulen) and negotiating with the GEW teachers’ union to launch at least ten integrated-school trials in 1969. These initiatives, along with upper-secondary reform (Oberstufenreform), drew opposition from the CDU but influenced nationwide education policy.

During and after his ministerial tenure he also shaped higher-education modernisation in Hesse, reforming universities and teacher-training programs.

== Later life ==
Returning full-time to the IfS, Friedeburg remained active in education and civic debates. In 1999 he delivered remarks at the opening of the Wehrmachtsausstellung in Kiel, continuing to engage Germany’s public discourse on history and democracy. He died in Frankfurt am Main on 17 May 2010.

== Personal life ==
Friedeburg married Ellen Schölch. His known children are Robert (born 1961) and Christoph (born 1974). His younger brother Friedrich-Ferdinand von Friedeburg (1926–1991) also served in the navy.

== Selected works ==
- Soziologie des Betriebsklimas. Studien zur Deutung empirischer Untersuchungen in industriellen Gesellschaften. Suhrkamp, Frankfurt am Main, 1963.
- Foreword to Theodor W. Adorno, Studien zum autoritären Charakter (1973 edition).

== Legacy ==
Historians and education scholars credit Friedeburg with linking Frankfurt-school empiricism to practical reform, particularly in Hesse’s school system. His long directorship stabilised the Institute for Social Research after Adorno’s death and before the tenure of Axel Honneth, consolidating its profile as a leading center of critical and empirical social research.

== Bibliography ==
- Busch, Rainer; Röll, Hans-Joachim (1996). Der U-Boot-Krieg 1939-1945 (in German). Vol. I: Die Deutschen U-Boot-Kommandanten. Hamburg, Berlin, Bonn, Germany: E.S. Mittler & Sohn. pp. 72–73. ISBN 978-3-8132-0490-2.
