= SS Arabutan =

Brazilian-owned cargo ship sunk in World War II

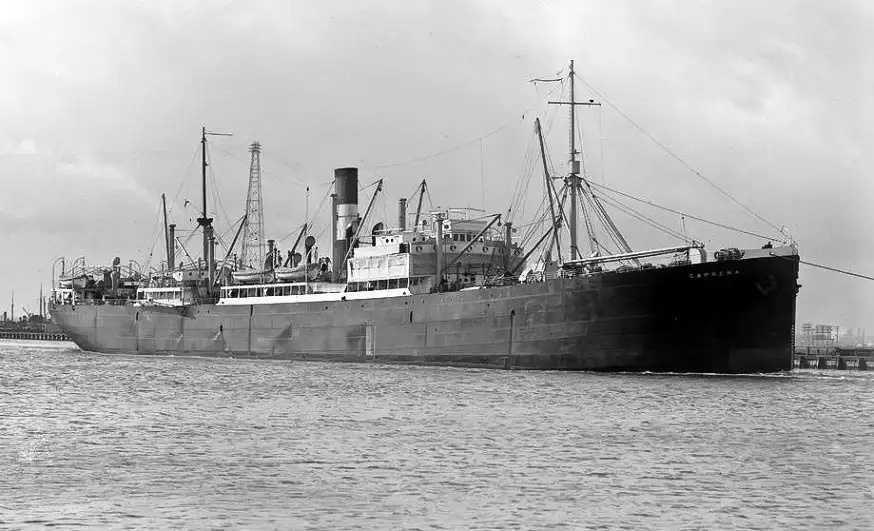
- The ship as Caprera, in the 1920s

History
- Name: 1917: War Sword; 1919: Caprera; 1941: Arabutan
- Namesake: 1919: Caprera
- Owner: 1917: Shipping Controller; 1919: Nav Generale Italiana; 1932: Italia Flotte Reuniti; 1933: Dr PL Correa e Castro; 1934: Pedro Brandão
- Operator: 1917: Cunard Line; 1941: Lloyd Nacional
- Port of registry: 1917: (United Kingdom) London; 1919: (Kingdom of Italy) Genoa; 1934: (Brazil); 1941: (Brazil) Rio de Janeiro
- Builder: Union Iron Works, San Francisco
- Yard number: 142
- Launched: 7 July 1917
- Completed: September 1917
- Out of service: aground June 1932; refloated August 1932; laid up until 1941
- Refit: 1941
- Identification: 1917: UK official number 140413; 1917: code letters JQSV; 1922: Italian official number 888; 1922: code letters NKVD; 1930: code letters NHRB
- Fate: sunk by torpedo, March 1942

General characteristics
- Type: cargo steamship
- Tonnage: 7,624 GRT, 4,870 NRT
- Length: 410.0 ft (125.0 m)
- Beam: 56.0 ft (17.1 m)
- Draught: 30 ft 6 in (9.30 m)
- Depth: 38.0 ft (11.6 m)
- Decks: 2
- Installed power: 1 × triple-expansion engine: 609 NHP
- Propulsion: 1 × screw
- Crew: 1942: 52
- Sensors & processing systems: by 1930: wireless direction finding

SS Arabutan was a cargo steamship. She was built in California in 1917 for the United Kingdom Shipping Controller as War Sword. In 1919 Navigazione Generale Italiana (NGI) bought her and renamed her Caprera. In 1932 she grounded off Rio de Janeiro, and her wreck was acquired by Brazilian interests. She was refloated, and laid up in Rio de Janeiro. In 1941 she was reconditioned, renamed Arabutan, and returned to service. In March 1942 a German U-boat sank her, killing one member of her crew.

She was the third NGI ship to be named after the island of Caprera, off Sardinia. The first was an iron-hulled ship, built in 1856 as Express, renamed Caprera in 1862, sold and renamed in 1899, and scrapped in 1913. The second was a steel-hulled ship built in 1904, and sunk by a U-boat in 1917.

== War Sword ==
Union Iron Works in San Francisco built the ship as yard number 142; launched her on 7 July 1917 as War Sword; and completed her that September. Her registered length was 410.0 ft (125.0 m); her beam was 56.0 ft (17.1 m); her depth was 38.0 ft (11.6 m); and her draught was 30 ft 6 in (9.30 m). Her tonnages were 7,624 GRT and 4,870 NRT. She had a single screw, driven by a three-cylinder triple-expansion engine that was rated at 609 NHP.

On 3 August 1917, the US government took over the ship, as one of 400 ships that it took up for the US war effort. However, that September, it released her to the UK government. War Sword was registered in London. Her UK official number was 140413, and her code letters were JQSV. The Shipping Controller appointed Cunard Line to manage her. On 13 October, while carrying cargo including 500 tons of explosive, War Sword successfully fought off a U-boat attack that lasted for several hours.

== Caprera ==
In 1919, Navigazione Generale Italiana bought the ship, and renamed her after the Sicilian island of Caprera. She was registered in Genoa, and her Italian official number was 888. By 1922, her code letters were NKVD; but by 1930, they had been changed to NHRB, and Caprera had been equipped with wireless direction finding. On 2 January 1932, her owners became part of Italia Flotte Reuniti.

On 1 June 1932, Caprera grounded at Ilha de Mai in Guanabara Bay in Brazil, 15 miles north of Rio de Janeiro. She was declared a total loss, but that August she was refloated, and laid up in Rio de Janeiro. At first Dr Pedro Luiz Correa e Castro owned her wreck, but by 1934 she belonged to Pedro Brandão.

== Arabutan ==
In 1941, Henrique Lage's Lage e Irmãos shipyard on Ilha do Viana in Rio de Janeiro rebuilt the ship. She was renamed Arabutan; registered in Rio de Janeiro; and Brandão appointed Lloyd Nacional to manage her.

Early in 1942, Arabutan left New York for Trinidad and Rio de Janeiro. She called at Hampton Roads, and was carrying a cargo of coal and coke. Her Master was Captain Aníbal Alfredo do Prado, and her complement included 50 other officers and ratings. She also carried one survivor from Buarque, which had been sunk on 15 February; and three sailors from the Brazilian tanker Itamaraty.

At 21:10 hrs on 7 March 1942, Arabutan was about 81 miles off Cape Hatteras when U-155 hit her with one torpedo fired from one of its stern tubes. One crew member was killed; probably by the explosion while he was asleep in his cabin. Captain do Prado, his crew, and passengers abandoned ship in four lifeboats. Arabutan sank at position 35°15′0″N 73°55′12″W, 13 minutes after being hit.

About six hours later, an aircraft sighted the boats. On 8 March, USCGC Calypso rescued the survivors from all four boats; sank the boats to prevent a hazard to navigation; and landed the survivors at Little Creek, Virginia. On 15 February, Calypso had rescued survivors from Buarque, which meant that the Buarque survivor aboard Arabutan was rescued twice in three weeks by the same cutter.

== Bibliography ==
- Haws, Duncan (2001). Italia 1881–2001. Merchant Fleets. Vol. 40. Pembroke. ISBN 0-946378-43-6.
- Lloyd's Register of Shipping. Vol. II.–Steamers. London: Lloyd's Register of Shipping. 1920 – via Internet Archive.
- Lloyd's Register of Shipping. Vol. II.–Steamers and Motor Vessels. London: Lloyd's Register of Shipping. 1922 – via Internet Archive.
- Lloyd's Register of Shipping (PDF). Vol. II.–Steamers and Motorships of 300 tons gross and over. London: Lloyd's Register of Shipping. 1930 – via Southampton City Council.
- Lloyd's Register of Shipping (PDF). Vol. II.–Steamers and Motorships of 300 tons gross and over. London: Lloyd's Register of Shipping. 1933 – via Southampton City Council.
- Lloyd's Register of Shipping (PDF). Vol. II.–Steamers and Motorships of 300 tons gross and over. London: Lloyd's Register of Shipping. 1934 – via Southampton City Council.
- Lloyd's Register of Shipping (PDF). Vol. II.–Steamers and Motorships of 300 tons gross and over. London: Lloyd's Register of Shipping. 1941 – via Southampton City Council.
- Mercantile Navy List. London: Registrar General of Shipping and Seamen. 1918 – via Crew List Index Project.
- Sander, Roberto (2007). O Brasil na mira de Hitler: a história do afundamento de navios brasileiros pelos nazistas (in Portuguese). Rio de Janeiro: Objetiva.
- Wynn, Kenneth G (1998). U-Boat Operations of the Second World War. Vol. 2: Career Histories. Annapolis, MD: Naval Institute Press.
