= German submarine U-155 (1941) =

German World War II submarine

Coordinates: 55.583°N 7.650°W

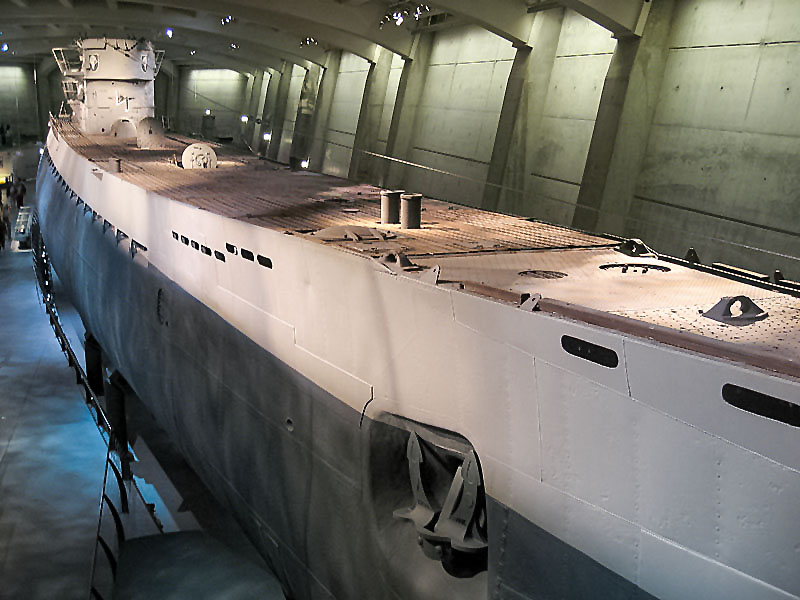
- U-505, a typical Type IXC boat

History

Nazi Germany
- Name: U-155
- Ordered: 25 September 1939
- Builder: DeSchiMAG AG Weser, Bremen
- Yard number: 997
- Laid down: 1 October 1940
- Launched: 12 May 1941
- Commissioned: 23 August 1941
- Fate: Surrendered at Fredericia, 5 May 1945; Sunk during Operation Deadlight on 21 December 1945

General characteristics
- Class & type: Type IXC submarine
- Displacement: 1,120 t (1,100 long tons) surfaced; 1,232 t (1,213 long tons) submerged
- Length: 76.76 m (251 ft 10 in) o/a; 58.75 m (192 ft 9 in) pressure hull
- Beam: 6.76 m (22 ft 2 in) o/a; 4.40 m (14 ft 5 in) pressure hull
- Height: 9.60 m (31 ft 6 in)
- Draught: 4.70 m (15 ft 5 in)
- Installed power: 4,400 PS (3,200 kW; 4,300 bhp) (diesels); 1,000 PS (740 kW; 990 shp) (electric)
- Propulsion: 2 shafts; 2 × diesel engines; 2 × electric motors
- Speed: 18.3 knots (33.9 km/h; 21.1 mph) surfaced; 7.3 knots (13.5 km/h; 8.4 mph) submerged
- Range: 13,450 nmi (24,910 km; 15,480 mi) at 10 knots (19 km/h; 12 mph) surfaced; 64 nmi (119 km; 74 mi) at 4 knots (7.4 km/h; 4.6 mph) submerged
- Test depth: 230 m (750 ft)
- Complement: 4 officers, 44 enlisted48 to 56
- Armament: 6 × torpedo tubes (4 bow, 2 stern); 22 × 53.3 cm (21 in) torpedoes; 1 × 10.5 cm (4.1 in) SK C/32 deck gun (180 rounds); 1 × 3.7 cm (1.5 in) SK C/30 AA gun; 1 × twin 2 cm FlaK 30 AA guns

Service record
- Part of: 4th U-boat Flotilla; 23 August 1941 – 31 January 1942; 10th U-boat Flotilla; 1 February 1942 – 14 August 1944; 33rd U-boat Flotilla; 15 August 1944 – 5 May 1945
- Identification codes: M 01 188
- Commanders: K.Kapt. Adolf Piening; 23 August 1941 – February 1944; Oblt.z.S. Johannes Rudolph; February – 14 August 1944; Lt.z.S. Ludwig von Friedeburg; 15 August – November 1944; Oblt.z.S. Johannes Rudolph; November – December 1944; Kptlt. Erwin Witte; December 1944 – 20 April 1945; Oblt.z.S. Friedrich Altmeier; 21 April – 5 May 1945
- Operations: 10 patrols: 1st patrol: 7 February – 27 March 1942; 2nd patrol: 24 April – 14 June 1942; 3rd patrol: 9 July – 15 September 1942; 4th patrol: 7 November – 30 December 1942; 5th patrol: 8 February – 30 April 1943; 6th patrol: 10 – 16 June 1943; 7th patrol: a. 30 June – 11 August 1943; b. 18 – 19 September 1943; 8th patrol: a. 21 September 1943 – 1 January 1944; b. 5 – 6 March 1944; 9th patrol: 11 March – 23 June 1944; 10th patrol: 9 September – 21 October 1944
- Victories: 25 merchant ships sunk (126,664 GRT); 1 warship sunk (13,785 tons); 1 auxiliary warship damaged (6,736 GRT)

German submarine U-155 was a Type IXC U-boat of Nazi Germany's Kriegsmarine built for service during World War II. Her keel was laid down on 1 October 1940 by DeSchiMAG AG Weser in Bremen as yard number 997. She was launched on 12 May 1941 and commissioned on 23 August with Kapitänleutnant Adolf Piening in command. Piening was relieved in February 1944 (after being promoted to Korvettenkapitän), by Oberleutnant zur See Johannes Rudolph.

== Design ==
German Type IXC submarines were slightly larger than the original Type IXBs. U-155 had a displacement of 1,120 tonnes (1,100 long tons) when at the surface and 1,232 tonnes (1,213 long tons) while submerged. The U-boat had a total length of 76.76 m (251 ft 10 in), a pressure hull length of 58.75 m (192 ft 9 in), a beam of 6.76 m (22 ft 2 in), a height of 9.60 m (31 ft 6 in), and a draught of 4.70 m (15 ft 5 in). The submarine was powered by two MAN M 9 V 40/46 supercharged four-stroke, nine-cylinder diesel engines producing a total of 4,400 metric horsepower (3,240 kW; 4,340 shp) for use while surfaced, two Siemens-Schuckert 2 GU 345/34 double-acting electric motors producing a total of 1,000 metric horsepower (740 kW; 990 shp) for use while submerged. She had two shafts and two 1.92 m (6 ft) propellers. The boat was capable of operating at depths of up to 230 metres (750 ft).

The submarine had a maximum surface speed of 18.3 knots (33.9 km/h; 21.1 mph) and a maximum submerged speed of 7.3 knots (13.5 km/h; 8.4 mph). When submerged, the boat could operate for 63 nautical miles (117 km; 72 mi) at 4 knots (7.4 km/h; 4.6 mph); when surfaced, she could travel 13,450 nautical miles (24,910 km; 15,480 mi) at 10 knots (19 km/h; 12 mph). U-155 was fitted with six 53.3 cm (21 in) torpedo tubes (four fitted at the bow and two at the stern), 22 torpedoes, one 10.5 cm (4.13 in) SK C/32 naval gun, 180 rounds, and a 3.7 cm (1.5 in) SK C/30 as well as a 2 cm (0.79 in) C/30 anti-aircraft gun. The boat had a complement of forty-eight.

== Service history ==
Leutnant zur See Ludwig von Friedeburg relieved Rudolph from August to November 1944, when Rudolph resumed command for another month. During these four months, U-155 had the youngest U-boat commander during the war since Von Friedeburg was only 20 years old. In December, Kptlt. Erwin Witte took over, and was relieved in April 1945 by Oblt.z.S. Friedrich Altmeier. Altmeier commanded the boat for one month before the German surrender; U-155 was then scuttled by the Royal Navy. The wreck was located, largely intact, in 2001.

U-155 conducted ten patrols, sinking 25 ships totalling 126,664 gross register tons (GRT), one warship of 13,785 tons and damaging one auxiliary warship of 6,736 GRT. She was a member of one wolfpack. She sank a warship and a troop transport ship, and damaged a cargo ship, with one salvo of four torpedoes on 15 November 1942 during her fourth patrol, and shot down a P-51 Mustang aircraft on her final patrol.

== First patrol ==
U-155 left Kiel on her first patrol on 7 February 1942. Her route took her 'up' the North Sea, through the gap between the Faroe and Shetland Islands and into the Atlantic. South of Cape Farewell in Greenland, she sank Sama and Adellen on the 22nd.

She then moved on to the US east coast, sinking the SS Arabutan about 81 nmi (150 km; 93 mi) off Cape Hatteras, North Carolina on 7 March. On the tenth, the First Watch Officer (1WO) Oberleutnant zur See Gert Rentrop was washed overboard.

The boat docked at the Lorient U-boat base on the Atlantic coast of German-occupied France on March 27.

== Second patrol ==
Having left Lorient on 24 April 1942, U-155 steamed to the eastern Caribbean Sea and the portion of the Atlantic adjacent to it. She attacked Brabant southwest of Grenada on 14 May. The ship sank in eight minutes.

The U-boat sank another six ships; one of them, Sylvan Arrow, was torpedoed on 20 May, but did not go down until the 28th, following a salvage attempt.

The submarine returned to Lorient on 14 June.

== Third patrol ==
U-155's third and most successful foray was conducted in similar waters to her second effort, beginning in Lorient on 9 July. She sank Barbacena with torpedoes east of Barbados, but others, such as Piave, went to the bottom with the more economic deck gun. Another victim, Cranford, met her end within three minutes. Part of her cargo was 6,600 tons of chrome ore. Two injured survivors were treated on U-155 before water, supplies and directions were handed over to their colleagues.

The submarine's skipper apologized for sinking one ship (Empire Arnold on 4 August), to the Chief Officer, who told him it was a bad business and wished it [the war] was over. Piening replied: "So do I".

Maschinengefreiter Konrad Garneier was lost overboard during an air attack on 19 August.

In all, the boat sank ten ships, a total of 43,514 GRT.

== Fourth patrol ==
Three of a spread of four torpedoes hit targets, one aal (eel: U-boat slang for torpedo), damaged USS Almaack, a US Navy-requisitioned cargo transport; two others sank escort carrier HMS Avenger and the British troop transport Ettrick on 15 November 1942 northwest of Gibraltar. Of 526 men on Avenger, there were 12 survivors. Ettrick's master was awarded the Order of the British Empire (OBE).

The boat also sank Serroskerk in mid-Atlantic. There were no survivors.

== Fifth patrol ==
U-155's fifth sortie involved her move to the western Caribbean and southern Florida, USA. She sank Lysefjord west of Havana on 2 April 1943, and on 3 April sank the oil tanker Gulfstate about 50 nmi (93 km; 58 mi) east northeast of Marathon Key, Florida (in 2013 the National Oceanic and Atmospheric Administration's Remediation of Underwater Legacy Environmental Threats (RULET) project found the sunken Gulfstate to be a potential source of oil pollution.)

On the return journey U-155 was attacked by an unknown aircraft on 27 April northwest of Cape Finisterre, Spain.

== Sixth patrol ==
To try and counter the air threat, U-155 was grouped together with U-68, U-159, U-415 and U-634 in the Bay of Biscay. The formation was attacked by four de Havilland Mosquito aircraft on 14 June — three from No. 307 Polish Night Fighter Squadron and one from No. 410 Squadron RCAF. One Mosquito, hit in the port engine, was forced to break off its attack and return to base where it made a belly landing. Five men in the boat's crew were wounded; they were treated by U-68's doctor on their return to Lorient on 16 June.

== Seventh and eighth patrols ==
Patrol number seven was as long as any of the others, to a point northeast of the Cape Verde Islands; but the boat did not find any targets.

The submarine's eighth patrol took her toward the northeast coast of Brazil. While sinking Siranger she took the third mate prisoner (he had been wounded, and was operated-on by the boat's doctor). He was taken back to Lorient and was eventually transferred to the POW camp at Milag Nord near Bremen.

== Ninth and tenth patrols ==
U-155's ninth patrol was, at 105 days, her longest, but like her seventh, found no targets. On 4 May 1944, the boat shot down a North American P-51 Mustang aircraft of No. 126 Squadron RAF and on 23 June 1944, Mosquitos of 248 Squadron attacked, killing Matrosenobergefreiter Karl Lohmeier and Mechanikerobergefreiter Friedrich Feller and wounding seven others. Her patrol terminated at Lorient the same day.

Her tenth and final patrol left Lorient on 9 September 1944, the last by a U-boat from the base. The patrol was uneventful; she returned to Germany by a circuitous route, and docked at Flensburg on 21 October.

== Fate ==
On 22 June 1945, after the German surrender, she was transferred from Wilhelmshaven to Loch Ryan, Scotland for Royal Navy Operation Deadlight, the scuttling of surrendered German U-boats, and sunk on 21 December the same year.

== Post war ==
U-155 was located and identified in 2001 by a team of divers led by nautical archaeologist Innes McCartney, revealing the wreck was lying upright on the sea bed, largely intact, at a depth of 73 metres (240 ft; 40 fathoms).

Her crew held their 25th reunion in 1995 with former Oberleutnant zur See Johannes Rudolph and one of the Mosquito pilots who attacked the boat in June 1944 'on board'.

== Summary of raiding history ==
Date	Ship Name	Nationality	Tonnage (Note: Merchant ship tonnages are in gross register tons. Military vessels are listed by tons displacement.)	Fate
22 February 1942	Adellen	United Kingdom	7,984	Sunk
22 February 1942	Sama	Norway	1,799	Sunk
7 March 1942	Arabutan	Brazil	7,874	Sunk
14 May 1942	Brabant	Belgium	2,483	Sunk
17 May 1942	Challenger	United States	7,667	Sunk
17 May 1942	San Victorio	United Kingdom	8,136	Sunk
20 May 1942	Sylvan Arrow	Panama	7,797	Sunk
23 May 1942	Watsonville	Panama	2,220	Sunk
28 May 1942	Poseidon	Netherlands	1,928	Sunk
30 May 1942	Baghdad	Norway	2,161	Sunk
28 July 1942	Barbacena	Brazil	4,772	Sunk
28 July 1942	Piave	Brazil	2,347	Sunk
28 July 1942	Bill	Norway	2,445	Sunk
30 July 1942	Cranford	United States	6,096	Sunk
1 August 1942	Clan Macnaughton	United Kingdom	6,088	Sunk
1 August 1942	Kentaur	Netherlands	5,878	Sunk
4 August 1942	Empire Arnold	United Kingdom	7,045	Sunk
5 August 1942	Draco	Netherlands	389	Sunk
9 August 1942	San Emiliano	United Kingdom	8,071	Sunk
10 August 1942	Strabo	Netherlands	383	Sunk
15 November 1942	Ettrick	United Kingdom	11,279	Sunk
15 November 1942	HMS Avenger	Royal Navy	13,785	Sunk
15 November 1942	USS Almaack	United States Navy	6,736	Damaged
6 December 1942	Serooskerk	Netherlands	8,456	Sunk
2 April 1943	Lysefjord	Norway	1,091	Sunk
3 April 1943	Gulfstate	United States	6,882	Sunk
24 October 1943	Siranger	Norway	5,393	Sunk

== See also ==
- List of Operation Deadlight U-boats

== Bibliography ==
- Busch, Rainer; Röll, Hans-Joachim (1999). German U-boat commanders of World War II : a biographical dictionary. Translated by Brooks, Geoffrey. London, Annapolis, Md: Greenhill Books, Naval Institute Press. ISBN 1-55750-186-6.
- Busch, Rainer; Röll, Hans-Joachim (1999). Deutsche U-Boot-Verluste von September 1939 bis Mai 1945 [German U-boat losses from September 1939 to May 1945]. Der U-Boot-Krieg (in German). Vol. IV. Hamburg, Berlin, Bonn: Mittler. ISBN 3-8132-0514-2.
- Gröner, Erich; Jung, Dieter; Maass, Martin (1991). U-boats and Mine Warfare Vessels. German Warships 1815–1945. Vol. 2. Translated by Thomas, Keith; Magowan, Rachel. London: Conway Maritime Press. ISBN 0-85177-593-4.
