= USS Challenger =

History

United States
- Name: USS Challenger
- Builder: Union Iron Works
- Launched: 4 July 1918
- Acquired: 4 October 1918
- Commissioned: 4 October 1918
- Decommissioned: 2 May 1919
- Fate: Transferred to U.S. Shipping Board 2 May 1919; Sunk 17 May 1942

General characteristics
- Displacement: 16,000 t.
- Length: 410 ft (120 m)
- Beam: 56 ft (17 m)
- Draft: 30 ft (9.1 m)
- Propulsion: One 2,600 ihp (1,900 kW) steam engine, one shaft
- Speed: 11 knots (20 km/h; 13 mph)
- Complement: 70

USS Challenger was a U.S. freighter. It was commissioned by the U.S. Navy between 1918 and 1919 for service during World War I. It was built in 1918 by Union Iron Works, San Francisco, Calif., under a United States Shipping Board contract. The US Navy accepted delivery on 4 October 1918 and it was commissioned the same day. He then reported to the Naval Overseas Transportation Service.

Challenger cleared San Francisco 9 October 1918 for Mejillones and Antofagasta, Chile, where it loaded nitrates. Sailing on to deliver its cargo at Pensacola, Fla., 11 December, Challenger was next ordered to New Orleans to load cotton and steel for the French government. He was transferred to J. H. W. Steele Co. for operation. After a voyage in January and February 1919 carrying cargo to France to supply the Army of Occupation, Challenger returned to Baltimore, Md. It was decommissioned there 2 May 1919, and returned to the United States Shipping Board the same day.

On 17 May 1942 while serving with American-South African Line during World War II, it was torpedoed and sunk by the German submarine U-155.
