= HMS Avenger (D14) =

1942 Avenger-class escort carrier of the Royal Navy

Coordinates: 36°15′N 07°45′W

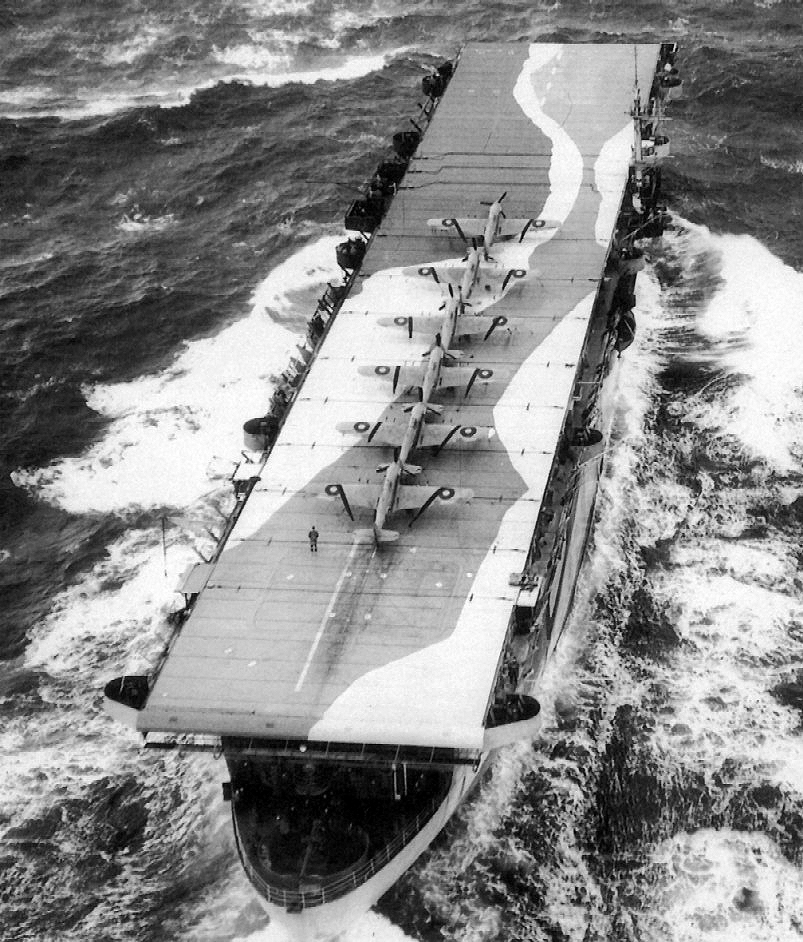
- HMS Avenger with Sea Hurricanes on deck

History

United Kingdom
- Name: Avenger
- Ordered: C3-P&C
- Builder: Sun Shipbuilding
- Laid down: 28 November 1939
- Launched: 27 November 1940
- Commissioned: 2 March 1942
- In service: 1942
- Home port: HMNB Clyde
- Fate: Sunk by U-155 off Gibraltar on 15 November 1942

General characteristics
- Class & type: Avenger-class escort carrier
- Displacement: 8,200 long tons (8,332 t) (normal); 9,000 long tons (9,144 t) (deep load)
- Length: 492.25 ft (150.04 m)
- Beam: 66.25 ft (20.19 m)
- Height: 23.25 ft (7.09 m)
- Propulsion: 1 shaft, 4 diesel engines giving 8,500 bhp (6,300 kW)
- Speed: 16.5 knots (30.6 km/h; 19.0 mph)
- Complement: 555
- Armament: 3 × QF 4 inch Mk XVI naval gun; 15 × Oerlikon 20 mm cannon on single and twin mounts
- Aircraft carried: 15 a mixture of; Fairey Swordfish; Hawker Sea Hurricane
- Aviation facilities: Hangar 190 ft (58 m) by 47 ft (14 m); Lift 42 feet (13 m) by 34 feet (10 m); 9 arrester wires

HMS Avenger was a Royal Navy escort aircraft carrier during the Second World War. In 1939 she was laid down as the merchant ship Rio-Hudson at the Sun Shipbuilding & Drydock Company yard in Chester, Pennsylvania. Launched on 27 November 1940, she was converted to an escort carrier and transferred under the lend lease agreement to the Royal Navy. She was commissioned on 2 March 1942.

Avenger's capacity allowed for a maximum of 15 aircraft. In September 1942, she took part in what was the largest and most successful Russian convoy to date. Upon her return home, after observing a number of design faults, Avenger's captain drew up recommendations for future escort carrier design. In November 1942 she took part in Operation Torch, the Allied invasion of North Africa, where she suffered engine problems. While leaving North Africa to start the journey home Avenger was sunk by the German submarine U-155 on 15 November 1942 at 3:20am GMT, 9 hours after leaving Gibraltar for Britain, with a heavy loss of life among her crew.

== Design and description ==
The Avenger-class escort carriers were converted American type C3 merchant ships of the C3 class. Their design was based on the U.S. Navy Long Island class (AVG1). To differentiate between the two classes, the Royal Navy ships were prefixed with a 'B' (BAVG). HMS Avenger (BAVG2) was built by the Sun Shipbuilding and Drydock Company in Chester, Pennsylvania, south of Philadelphia on the Delaware River. Originally named Rio-Hudson, she was laid down on 28 November 1939 as a passenger cargo ship for the American Moore-McCormack Lines, Inc., and was launched on 27 November 1940. She was then purchased by the United States Navy and converted to an escort aircraft carrier in the Bethlehem Steel yards at Staten Island. Transferred to the Royal Navy on 31 July 1941, she was commissioned 2 March 1942 when the conversion was completed.

Avenger had a complement of 555 men (including aircrew) and an overall length of 492.25 feet (150.04 m), a beam of 66.25 feet (20.19 m), and a height of 23.25 ft (7.09 m). She displaced 8,200 long tons (8,332 t) at normal load and 9,000 long tons (9,144 t) at deep load. Propulsion was provided by four diesel engines connected to one shaft, giving 8,500 brake horsepower. This could propel the ship at 16.5 knots (30.6 km/h; 19.0 mph).

Aircraft facilities were composed of a small combined bridge-flight control on the starboard side above the 410-foot (120 m) long wooden flight deck, one 43 by 34 feet (13 m × 10 m) aircraft lift, one aircraft catapult, and nine arrestor wires. Aircraft could be housed in the 190 by 47 feet (58 m × 14 m) half hangar below the flight deck. Her armament consisted of three single-mounted 4 inch dual purpose anti-aircraft guns—two forward and one aft—and fifteen 20 mm cannon on single or twin mounts. She had the capacity for fifteen aircraft, which could be a mixture of Grumman Martlet or Hawker Sea Hurricane fighter aircraft and Fairey Swordfish anti-submarine aircraft.

== Service history ==
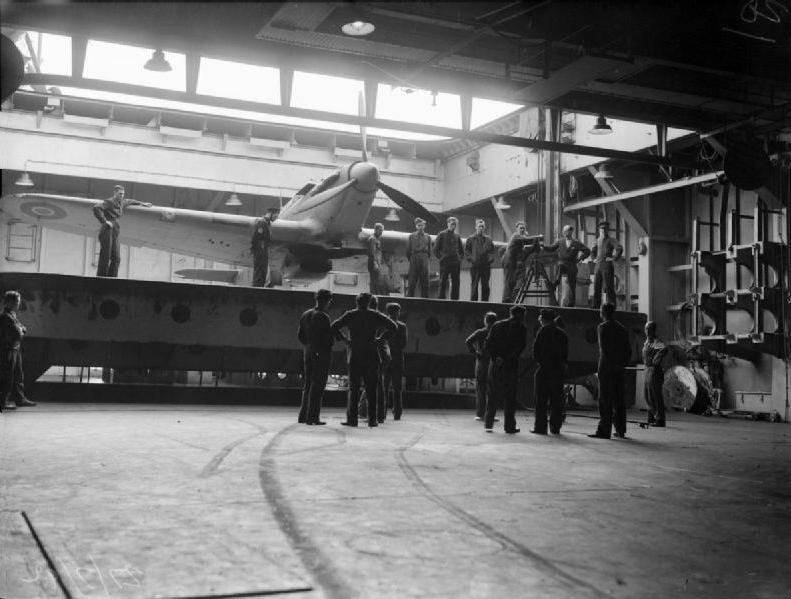
Inside the hangar of HMS Avenger, a lift brings down a Sea Hurricane of 802 Naval Air Squadron.

On 18 April 1942, Avenger started flight deck landing training with four Fairey Swordfish aircraft of 816 Naval Air Squadron, Fleet Air Arm. The exercise had to be curtailed when her engines broke down. Repaired by 30 April 1942, she joined the escort for convoy AT 15 to cross the Atlantic to Britain. During the crossing the Swordfish of 816 Squadron provided anti-submarine patrols. On 4 May, two aircraft lost the convoy in heavy weather and requested a homing beacon from Avenger. She was unable to help, not having the correct equipment, and both aircraft and crews were reported missing. When Avenger arrived in Britain the Fleet Air Arm had a shortage of Martlet fighter aircraft, so a small number of Royal Air Force Hawker Hurricanes were converted into Sea Hurricanes. Avenger was chosen to test their deck landing ability on escort carriers. The tests, flown by Eric "Winkle" Brown, were successful, and the Sea Hurricane equipped 802 Naval Air Squadron and 882 Naval Air Squadron, with 12 aircraft assigned to Avenger. They were joined by three Fairey Swordfish and five crews from 825 Naval Air Squadron. (Note: 825 Naval Air Squadron Swordfish aircraft were involved in the sinking of the German battleship Bismarck on 26–27 May 1941 and the attacks on the German battleships Gneisenau and Scharnhorst in the Channel Dash on 12 February 1942.)

=== Convoy PQ 18 ===
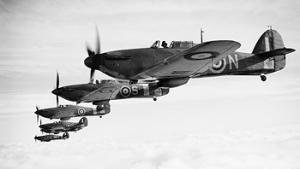
Fleet Air Arm Sea Hurricanes in formation

On 3 September 1942, under the command of ex-Swordfish pilot Commander Anthony Paul Colthust, Avenger left Britain for Iceland to take part in Convoy PQ 18. The weather was cold, and in heavy seas one of her Sea Hurricanes broke its restraints and was lost over the side. The ship was located at sea by a Luftwaffe Focke-Wulf Condor, and shortly after arriving in Iceland, Avenger was subjected to a bombing attack by another Condor. Both of the bombs it dropped missed the ship, but two houses ashore were demolished. In their determination for PQ 18 to be a success, the Royal Navy created the largest escort force ever assembled for an Arctic convoy up until that time. Under command of Rear-Admiral Robert Burnett, the force included Avenger—the only aircraft carrier—which was joined by the anti-aircraft cruiser HMS Scylla and 16 fleet destroyers, plus the normal complement of close support sloops, corvettes, and minelayers. Avenger and Scylla, with the close escort destroyers Wheatland and Wilton, left Iceland and joined the convoy late on 9 September 1942. One of her Swordfish aircraft was immediately sent up on an anti-submarine patrol. Bad weather prevented any flying for the following two days, but the weather cleared by noon on 12 September. The clearer skies revealed a Blohm & Voss BV 138 flying boat shadowing the convoy. Four Hurricanes took off to intercept it but could not find it in the clouds. Later the same day, a Swordfish on anti-submarine patrol sighted two U-boats; they had dived by the time the escorts got into position.

The next day, 13 September, a Swordfish took off on patrol at 03:45 and attacked a U-boat on the surface. At 07:00, another Swordfish sighted two U-boats, which dived before an attack could be launched. Later another Blohm & Voss BV 138 was sighted and Sea Hurricanes were sent to intercept it, but it was lost in the clouds. At 09:00 two merchant ships were torpedoed and sunk; more aircraft and U-boats were located shadowing the convoy. This time the Sea Hurricanes did locate the German reconnaissance aircraft but found their .303 calibre machine guns had little effect on the armoured Blohm & Voss aircraft. At 15:00 six Junkers Ju 88 which had been circling the convoy headed in on a bombing attack. No ships were hit, and the Sea Hurricanes started to engage them. The bombing mission appears to have been a diversion to get the fighters out of position. It was followed with a torpedo attack by a mixed formation of 50 Junkers Ju 88 and Heinkel He 111. The attacking planes flew into an intense anti-aircraft barrage which shot down five aircraft and disrupted the others, so that out of 96 torpedoes only eight found a target. One of the He 111s was also intercepted and shot down by the Sea Hurricanes. Another air attack by nine Heinkel He 115 torpedo bombers followed at 16:15. One was shot down by the convoy's anti-aircraft barrage, and the rest were sufficiently deterred so that their torpedoes, dropped at a distance, were easily evaded by the ships in the convoy. During this attack the Sea Hurricanes had again been diverted to look for a shadowing Blohm & Voss BV 138, which ultimately shot one of them down without any apparent damage to itself. At 20:40 a force of 12 He 111 torpedo-bombers attacked in small groups, but almost half were shot down by the anti-aircraft barrage and the Sea Hurricanes, which were in position to intercept them this time.

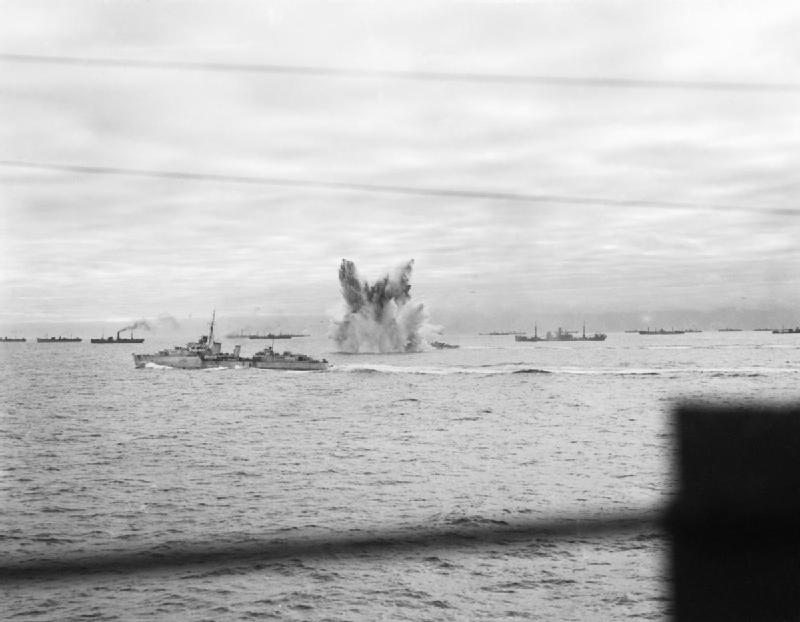
Convoy PQ 18 an underwater detonation erupts next to HMS Ashanti

At 03:30 on 14 September, a U-boat torpedoed and sank a tanker at the rear of the convoy. A patrolling Swordfish attacked at 04:00 and forced a surfaced U-boat to dive, although the submarine did not appear to be damaged. Another Swordfish sighted U-589 at 09:40; this submarine also dived, but was located and sunk by HMS Onslow. Avenger's captain now had to change tactics to work around a limitation of the Sea Hurricanes and Fairey Swordfish: They were not able to use the USN designed catapult which required a tail down take off, rather than the tail up method used by the Royal Navy's catapults, and so needed the full deck length to take off. (Note: Had they been equipped with Grumman Martlets, which could use the USN style catapult, they would have been able to launch and recover aircraft simultaneously.) He endeavoured to keep a section of fighter aircraft in the air during daylight hours and another ready to launch, so they could break up large German aircraft formations. This entailed a continuous cycle of take offs and landings to re-fuel and re-arm. At 12:30 a group of 22 Ju 88s and He 111s with an escort of Messerschmitt Bf 110s approached the convoy from dead ahead. Aboard Avenger, nine Sea Hurricanes took off. Their presence forced some of the German planes to drop their torpedoes early and turn away, while others were shot down by the anti-aircraft barrage. A simultaneous attack by a force of 14 Ju 88s at the rear of the convoy divided the Sea Hurricane squadrons, which shot down one of the Ju 88s. The carrier and escorts were targeted by the German aircraft, and about 20 aircraft succeeded in making a bombing run. One aircraft was shot down by the barrage, the eleventh of the day.

Immediately following, at 15:30, 25 He 111 torpedo bombers appeared in front of the convoy. Of these, 17 targeted Avenger, which managed to evade all the torpedoes. However, three of her Sea Hurricanes, which had closed on the He 111s, were shot down by the escorts' barrage. The pilots were all rescued. Another force of Ju 88s appeared and targeted Avenger and Scylla. Neither ship was hit, but a number of near misses were recorded. One near miss started a small fire in Avenger's catapult room, which was quickly dealt with. That was the last attack of the day. The Sea Hurricanes claimed five out of 24 aircraft shot down; another three were probably shot down; and 14 were damaged.

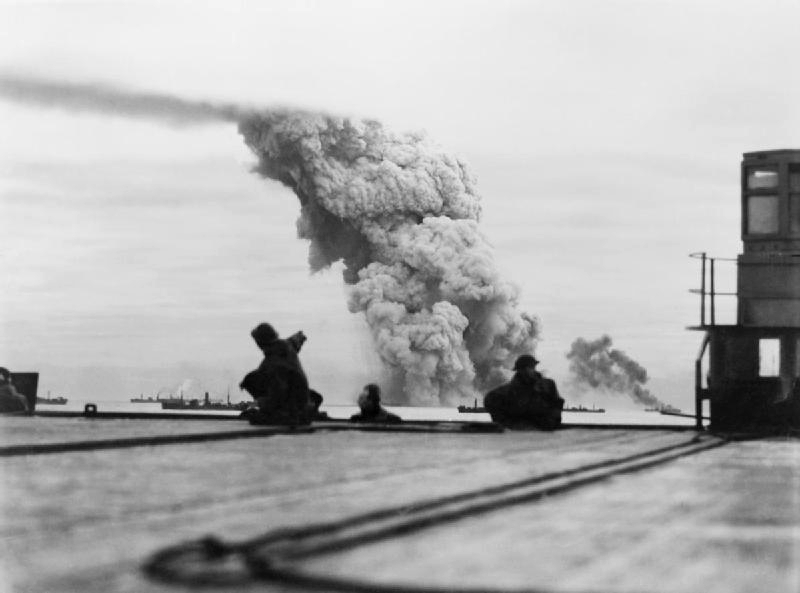
A merchant ship exploding, photographed from the flight deck of HMS Avenger

During the early hours of 15 September, the convoy was fogbound. The fog started to clear at 12:20, and Avenger's radar operator reported a group of 70 bombers approaching. All of Avenger's remaining Sea Hurricanes took off to intercept them. The presence of the fighters kept the bombers above the cloud level; their altitude kept them from bombing with any accuracy. The bombers remained in the vicinity of the convoy until fuel shortages forced them to leave, and by 16:45 Avenger's radar was clear of any targets. On 16 September a Consolidated Catalina of No. 210 Squadron RAF, based in Russia, arrived to take over the anti-submarine patrols from Avengers' Swordfish. This allowed her to clear the deck of Swordfish and assemble the spare Sea Hurricanes for the return journey. Avenger, Scylla, and the destroyers left PQ 18 that evening to join the homeward bound convoy leaving Russian waters. When Convoy PQ 18 arrived at Archangel no escorts and only ten of the 41 merchant ships in the convoy had been sunk.

=== Convoy QP 14 ===
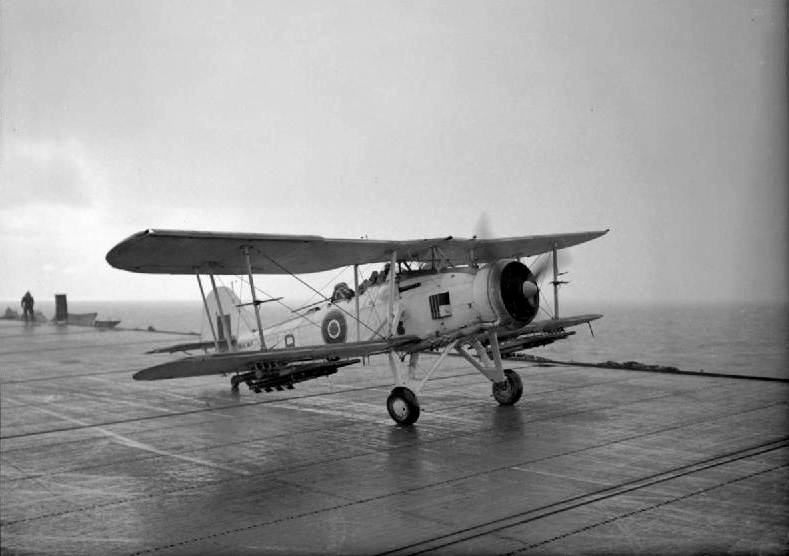
Fairey Swordfish taking off from an escort carrier

Avenger and the escorts joined the homeward bound Convoy QP 14 at 05:00 17 September and sent up a Swordfish on anti-submarine patrol, which was maintained throughout the day. Ice on the flight deck prevented any flying on 18 September, and the convoy turned further north, away from the German airfields in Norway. A German reconnaissance plane did locate the convoy, but only kept it under observation and did not attack, so the Sea Hurricanes were kept on board Avenger. The Swordfish remained on patrol on 19 and 20 September without locating any U-boats. One merchant ship was torpedoed and sunk on 20 September. At 18:45 that evening, with three destroyers as escorts, Avenger left the convoy for Scapa Flow. Almost as soon as she was out of sight, HMS Somali was torpedoed, and two days later a merchant ship was torpedoed and sunk. After returning to port, Avenger's captain Commander Colthust submitted a report highlighting how inadequate the Swordfish and Sea Hurricanes had been. In a single escort carrier the number of airframes and crews were never enough for what they had been asked to do. The Swordfish could not take off from the short flight deck of an escort carrier deck armed with torpedoes or enough depth charges and fuel to be useful, and the .303 calibre machine guns on the Sea Hurricane were ineffective against the armoured German reconnaissance aircraft.

=== Operation Torch ===
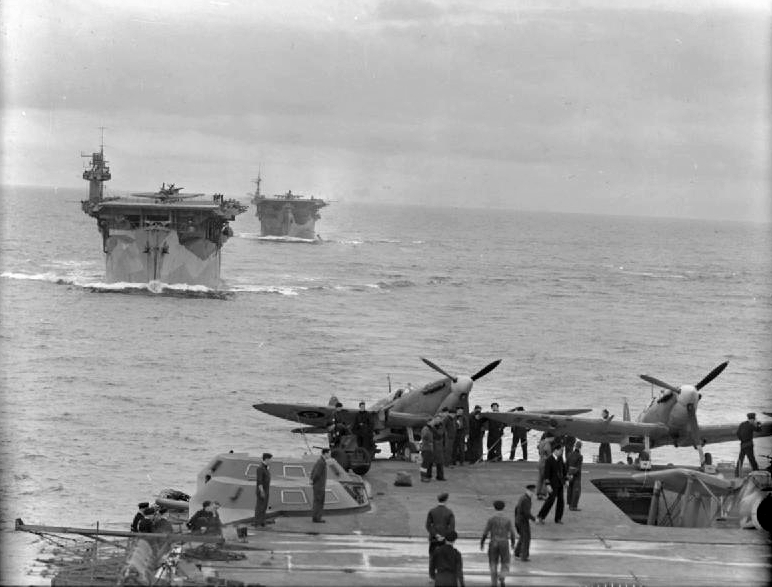
HMS Biter and Avenger seen from the deck of HMS Victorious, which has two Supermarine Seafires on board

HMS Avenger, HMS Biter, and HMS Victorious left Scapa for Greenock on 16 October 1942. Avenger still had the two Sea Hurricane squadrons on board, with two new aircraft armed with 20 mm cannon. Avenger was tasked with providing air cover for one of the convoys carrying the British assault force for Operation Torch. Once off North Africa she would join the covering force for the landings, with HMS Argus, three cruisers, and five destroyers. On arrival on 8 November 1942, the Supermarine Seafires from Argus and Avenger's Sea Hurricanes provided air cover for the landings. Between 8–10 November Avenger flew 60 fighter missions. On 9 November, she had a near miss by a torpedo from an He 111, and from 10 to 12 November she was laid up with engine problems before sailing for Gibraltar. Struck by a single torpedo fired by U-155, under the command of Kapitänleutnant Adolf Piening, on 15 November 1942 just west of Gibraltar, HMS Avenger sank quickly and with a heavy loss of life (516 perished). Only twelve members of her crew were rescued.

== Notes ==
Footnotes

Citations
