= USS Almaack =

Cargo ship of the United States Navy

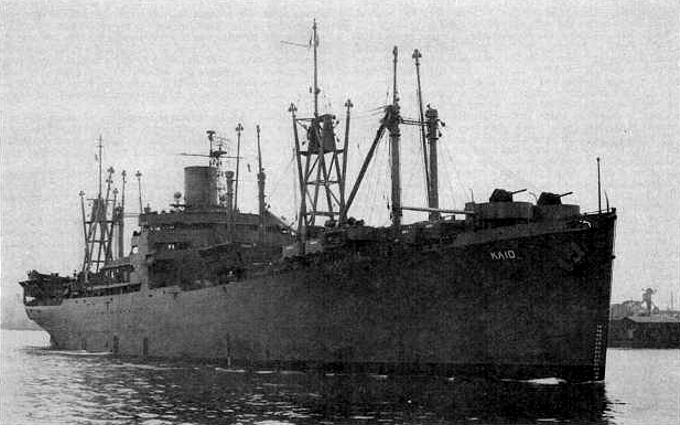
- USS Almaack (AKA-10)

History

United States
- Name: USS Almaack
- Namesake: Almaack, a star in the constellation Andromeda
- Laid down: 14 March 1940
- Launched: 21 September 1940
- Commissioned: 15 June 1941
- Decommissioned: 23 May 1946
- Stricken: 15 August 1946
- Fate: Scrapped 17 June 1970

General characteristics
- Displacement: 8,600 tons, loaded
- Length: 473 ft 1 in (144 m)
- Beam: 66 ft (20 m)
- Draft: 28 ft 5 in (9 m)
- Speed: 18.6 knots
- Complement: 426
- Armament: 1 × 5 in (130 mm)/38 cal dual purpose gun mount, 4 × 3 in (76 mm)/50 cal guns, 8 × .50 cal (12.7 mm) machine guns

USS Almaack (AKA-10) was an Almaack class attack cargo ship named after Almaack, a star system in the constellation Andromeda. She served as a commissioned ship for 4 years and 11 months.

The vessel was laid down as the merchant ship Executor on 14 March 1940, under a Maritime Commission contract (MC hull 104), at Quincy, Massachusetts, by the Fore River yard of Bethlehem Steel Co. She was launched on 21 September 1940, sponsored by Mrs. A.R. Winnett, and delivered to her owners, the American Export Lines, on 22 October 1940. Executor made two voyages to India before being acquired by the Navy on 3 June 1941 for conversion to a cargo ship. She was renamed Almaack and classified as AK-27. The ship was converted at the Tietjen and Lang Dry Dock Co., Hoboken, N.J.; Almaack was commissioned at the Army Transport Service Base, Brooklyn, on 15 June 1941, with Comdr. Thomas R. Cooley in command.

== Early World War II North Atlantic convoy operations ==
Almaack—with a cargo of heavy roadbuilding equipment and coal—cleared New York in convoy on 27 July 1941, bound for Iceland. Screened by a battleship, three heavy cruisers, and seven destroyers, the convoy included Almaack, a transport, a storeship and an oiler, and the aircraft carrier Wasp (CV-7)—the latter with planes of the 33d Pursuit Squadron (Curtiss P-40s) on board, earmarked for the defense of the base in Iceland. The convoy reached Reykjavík on 6 August, with Wasp launching the planes without incident. Almaack discharged her cargo at Reykjavík over the ensuing days, and departed that port on 12 August.

After loading at New York, Almaack proceeded to Trinidad, arriving there, via San Juan, Puerto Rico, on 20 September 1941. Returning thence to New York, the cargo ship sailed independently for Halifax, Nova Scotia, there joining convoy HX 154 for her second run to Iceland. On 13 November 1941, Almaack, together with the storeship USS Tarazed (AF-13), an Iceland-registry freighter, and five American destroyers, cleared Iceland for a rendezvous with west-bound convoy ON 35 south of Iceland.

Within 24 hours of sailing, one of the escorts, USS Eberle (DD-430), picked up a definite sound contact and attacked, dropping depth charges. Over the next 36 hours, the ships marched and countermarched through rough seas, awaiting the tardy convoy which ultimately arrived on the morning of 15 November.

== Difficulty in maintaining position in convoy ==
As Comdr. Cooley later reported, Almaack, "being light and big, was unable to maintain position in the convoy at speeds less than 7.5 knots (13.9 km/h)." The heavy weather wrought havoc on the abilities of the ships to stay in formation, and Almaack found herself on her own on three occasions, each time managing to rejoin the convoy. Upon rejoining for the third time, Comdr. Cooley informed the escort commander "what speed he would make and what positions he would pass through if separated again." When this came to pass, and the cargo ship was again on her own, Almaack proceeded independently to New York without incident. Reflecting back on the voyage, on 6 December 1941, Almaack's commanding officer opined that his ship would have been far safer "steaming alone... than in any convoy that does not maintain a speed of at least 10 knots (20 km/h)." He also used that occasion to press for his ship to be armed with at least two 4-inch or 5-inch (127 mm) guns. In endorsing Comdr. Cooley's report on 19 December, Admiral Ernest J. King, Commander in Chief, United States Atlantic Fleet, agreed to recommend independent routing for fast cargo ships such as Almaack unless "available information indicates undue danger from submarine concentration ... ."

== Preparations for war ==
Almaack then proceeded to Norfolk, where she underwent an overhaul at the Norfolk Navy Yard. During this refit, she was armed with a 5-inch (127 mm) gun, four 3-inch (76 mm) guns and eight .50-caliber machine guns. She also received a new paint job, Measure 12 (mod.) designed to alter her silouhette. She then loaded cargo, and sailed for Bermuda, returning thence to New York.

== World War II North Atlantic convoy operations ==
Loaded with a cargo of heavy construction equipment, Almaack sailed from New York on 19 January 1942, as an element of Convoy AT 12: 13 ships carrying 14,688 men—of this number 8,493 were Army troops being transported to Belfast, Northern Ireland, and 1,153 were sailors to man the new naval operating base being established at Derry. Other transports in the host were to take Army troops to Iceland to relieve the marines that had been there since July 1941. Almaack then returned to the United States in ballast, and, after again loading at New York, sailed for the Pacific on 9 April 1942.

== Pacific Theatre operations ==
Transiting the Panama Canal for the first time on 19 April 1942, Almaack sailed for the Tonga, or Friendly Islands, arriving at Tongatapu on 8 May. Discharging cargo there, the ship then sailed for the West Coast of the United States, arriving ultimately at San Diego on 5 June. Assigned to Transport Division 2 with Amphibious Forces, Pacific Fleet, Almaack underwent repairs and alterations at the Craig Shipbuilding at Long Beach, before she returned to San Diego on 15 July for landing exercises off the southern California coast.

== Supporting the invasion of North Africa ==
Returning to the East Coast of the United States and arriving at Norfolk on 12 September, Almaack underwent further alterations and repairs before proceeding to New York to load cargo. She sailed on 26 September for Scotland in TF 38. There, at Loch Fyne, the cargo ship participated in training for the invasion of North Africa until 21 October. Five days later, Almaack sailed for her first amphibious operation.

The voyage toward the coast of North Africa proved uneventful until 7 November 1942. Almaack—in column 01 of convoy KMFA1—went to general quarters at 0515, and soon thereafter heard an aircraft close by, on her port hand. At 0538, her watch noted the torpedoing of the nearby transport USS Thomas Stone. Ultimately, at 1800 the section of KMFA1 to which Almaack had been attached was directed to proceed to the waters off Algiers. As she stood toward the coast, she observed navigation lights—still burning but with reduced visibility—at Cape Matifu and Cape Caxine.

Reaching her release position at 2200, Almaack commenced lowering boats at that time, and completed the evolution in a little over an hour, at 2307. At 0145 on Sunday, 8 November 1942, the ship's boats began making their way shoreward, from about eight miles (13 km) off the beachhead. At 0208, all ships in "Charlie" sector stood shoreward to a position two miles (3.2 km) off "Charlie-Red" beach, where they would ultimately anchor several hours later. In the interim, Almaack's first boat returned from the beach at 0304, shortly before the ship reached her position.

== Under fire from enemy beach batteries ==
About 0346, Almaack observed gunfire starting in the vicinity of the city of Algiers; action continued intermittently until dawn. Anchoring off Beach Red at 0904, Almaack ceased cargo operations at 1015, "evidently because of excessive congestion of boats" at beach Charlie Red Two. Within the hour, however, the ship resumed unloading, but only vehicles and guns, as directed. As she did so, she observed three German Junkers Ju 88 bombers pass overhead at 10,000 feet (3,000 m)—evidently looking for bigger game or possessing empty racks, since they dropped no bombs.

Working to get high priority vehicles and antiaircraft guns unloaded, Almaack soon found the wind and sea making operations difficult. A strong breeze from the northeast rendered the operation of small boats hazardous by 1400, but the unloading continued in the face of mounting difficulties. By 1645, however, after the ship had managed to put ashore some 52 vehicles and guns during the day, "loading became impossible" in the teeth of a fresh to strong breeze and a rough sea.

== Under attack by German aircraft ==
Almaack sighted three more Ju 88s at 10,000 feet (3,000 m) shortly after sunset, and went to general quarters, opening fire with her antiaircraft battery soon thereafter as the three Junkers dive-bombed the nearby Samuel Chase. Following the dive bombers, other enemy planes, identified as Heinkel He 111s, attacked the disposition in the twilight, varying their manner of attack with shallow dives and low-level horizontal attacks from all directions, cleverly utilizing a land background to cover their approach.

Almaack's lookouts noted bombs or torpedoes dead ahead and on the starboard bow, and witnessed the torpedoing of USS Leedstown (AP-73) around 1715. Almaack ceased fire at 1735, and stood down from general quarters at 1801. At 2020, the ship secured her cargo-handling details because of the wind and sea conditions, with six of her boats secured to the stern—a condition that soon changed with worsening weather; two boats swamped, and the remainder were sent ashore. All night the wind continued to blow, and Almaack's coxswains put their landing craft on the beach.

The following day saw more attacks from German aircraft; Almaack went to general quarters twice before dawn, once during the mid watch, once during the morning watch. She went to general quarters again five more times before the day ended: once during the forenoon watch, thrice during the afternoon watch, and once during the first dog watch. She seemed to bear a charmed life; while her guns were busy adding to the general curtain of fire to repel the attacks of German planes (principally Ju 88s), ships nearby came under attack. Bombs apparently aimed at Almaack struck a British antiaircraft cruiser some 300 yards (300 m) astern. Underway late that afternoon, standing toward the port of Algiers, Almaack eventually anchored at 1721; the last attack for the day ended some 40 minutes later, with nightfall.

Underway at 0530 on 10 November, the cargo ship stood in to Algiers harbor and secured to a berth at the Mole Louis Billiard shortly before the commencement of the forenoon watch. Completing cargo operations early the following afternoon (11 November), Almaack cleared the mole and anchored in Algiers Bay, having completed her part in Operation "Torch."

On 12 November, Almaack departed Algiers, and soon thereafter rendezvoused with the nine transports and five escort vessels of Convoy MKFl(y) at Gibraltar. Bound for the British Isles on the morning of 15 November, Almaack, shortly before 0315, noticed escort vessels on her port beam firing' machine guns; almost simultaneously the convoy commodore called for an immediate right turn.

== Struck by a torpedo ==
Almaack had just completed the turn and steadied on her new course when she was struck by a torpedo launched from German submarine U-155. Kapitanleutnant Adolf Piening's marksmanship proved deadly. About the same time, torpedoes from his U-boat struck the freighter Ettrick (she later sank at 0836 that morning) and the escort carrier HMS Avenger; the latter blew up, taking with her almost all of her complement.

Almaack went to general quarters; a quick investigation of the damage revealed the engine and fire rooms, as well as hold number five and the shaft alley, flooded. Fortunately, the strength of the bulkheads contained the flooding and the ship remained afloat, although in a dangerous state. Four engineers on duty were lost: Gerald Keith Brown, F3c, of Atlantic, Iowa; Herbert Jess Kramer MM2cm, of Philadelphia; Frank Aloyousis Keefe Jr., F1c, of Philadelphia; and Dominick Virgilio, F2c, of Lansdale, Pennsylvania; and four more were badly burned in the explosion in the engine room.

== Towed to Gibraltar for repairs ==
Daybreak revealed HMS Glaisdale (L44), an escort vessel, standing by the sinking Ettrick, picking up survivors. Almaack arranged for Glaisdale to take on board some of her men, and transferred 8 officers and 185 men to the escort ship; 12 officers and 112 men remained on board to handle the ship and man the guns. HMS Brilliant arrived at 1540 to provide antisubmarine protection, and at 1340 the following day a British tug, Jaunty, accompanied by two trawlers, arrived to take the damaged cargo ship—at that point some eight miles (13 km) from the coast of Portugal— in tow, ultimately arriving at Gibraltar at 2300 on 17 November 1942.

Drydocked on 3 December at Gibraltar, Almaack was then placed on a waiting list for temporary repairs to enable her to return to the United States. While she lay in limbo at the British Crown Colony, she was reclassified to an attack cargo ship, AKA-10, on 31 January 1943.

Placed in drydock again on 3 March 1943, Almaack remained there until the last day of March; towed thence to Casablanca, French Morocco, the cargo ship began her long voyage home, astern of the fleet tug USS Arapaho (ATF-68), on 3 May.

== Stateside repairs ==
Over the next several months, Almaack underwent repairs and alterations at Norfolk Navy Yard; during this time she was repainted overall Measure 11, Sea Blue, and received new masts to handle the brood of landing craft assigned the ship. She also received new men; among them Ens. Wilmer H. Cressman, USNR, the father of one of the principal writers of this Dictionary volume.

Following trials, Almaack shifted down the East Coast to Jacksonville, Florida, where she loaded a cargo of Florida orange juice. She steamed to the West Coast, discharging her cargo at San Pedro, and then proceeded to San Diego, whence she conducted amphibious training exercises, chiefly at Oceanside and Coronado, into January 1944.

== Return to Pacific Theatre operations ==
Almaack sailed from San Diego on the morning of 13 January 1944, bound for Lahaina Roads, off the island of Maui. From there, she sailed for the Marshall Islands, and the first of her six amphibious operations of the Pacific War, departing Lahaina—the final staging area for Operation "Flintlock"—on the afternoon of 22 January, with elements of the 4th Marine Division embarked. Sailing as part of Task Force (TF) 53, Almaack reached the transport area for the initial assault on "Jacob" and "Ivan"— islands in Kwajalein Atoll—at 0500 on 31 January. That evening, Almaack hoisted out her boats and discharged cargoes of ammunition in response to a request for three units of fire to "Ivan".

Using her engines constantly to maintain position in the transport area against the two-knot northeasterly current and the northeast trade winds, Almaack provided LCMs to unload artillery from attack transports and LCVPs to unload men early on 1 February, and upon anchoring later that day received the services of two tank landing craft (LCT) to expedite unloading her own cargo. This unloading slowed down on the 2d, but picked up again on the 3d, the ship being aided in her cargo discharging by boats from USS William P. Biddle (APA-8), USS Warren (APA-53) and USS Sumter (APA-52). Ultimately, by 1330 on D + 4 (4 February), Almaack had completed her unloading.

Two days later, on 6 February, having loaded 22 LVTs of the 4th Tractor Battalion, USMC, and embarked their crews, Almaack sailed for Funafuti, in the Ellice Islands, in convoy with an amphibious command ship, three dock landing ships, a transport and a cargo ship, screened by four destroyers; she arrived at her destination on 10 February. From there, she sailed to Guadalcanal, in the Solomon Islands, again in convoy, and reached her destination on the afternoon of 13 February. There the ship unloaded the marine amphibious tractors brought down from Kwajalein, and disembarked their crews.

Proceeding thence to Nouméa, New Caledonia, for liberty, as well as firing and landing exercises, Almaack returned to Guadalcanal (Tulagi), and then to Funafuti, before she pushed on for Canton Island, and a stopover there to load "worn-out equipment" en route back to Hawaii.

== Exchanging cargoes at Pearl Harbor ==
Arriving at Honolulu on 10 April 1944, Almaack unloaded the cargo she had brought from Canton and then moved up to Pearl Harbor, where she underwent repairs and alterations and loaded 300 tons of 6-inch cruiser ammunition. She departed "Pearl" on 1 May for Maui, arriving later the same day, and there loaded combat equipment for elements of the 4th Marine Division earmarked for the invasion of Saipan, in the Marianas.

Proceeding back to Pearl Harbor after loading, Almaack then sailed for Lahaina, where she and the other ships slated to take part in the next major amphibious operation conducted rehearsals for it. Returning thence to Honolulu on the morning of 20 May, the ship remained there until the 29th, when she sailed as part of TG 52.15 for the Marshalls, the staging area for the Marianas.

== Hit by an enemy shell during Saipan invasion ==
Almaack arrived in the transport area off Saipan at 0535 on D-day, 15 June 1944, and had all of her tank lighters in the water in 19 minutes; expeditiously loading the eight M-4 "Sherman" tanks into her seven lighters and one provided by Sumter, the LCM-3s were on their way shoreward by 0711. During the day, an enemy shell (a mortar shell from Saipan or an artillery shell from Tinian), struck Almaack's number three LCM-3, killing one man outright—Seaman 2d Class Bernard V. Camerlinck Sr., USNR of Independence, Missouri{fact}—and wounding three other men, as well as three marines of the tank crew. Although nearly demolished, the LCM-3 put its cargo ashore safely. Almaack retired seaward that night, returning the next day to commence working her cargo, but limited beach space for unloading and the danger of enemy air attacks resulted in the ship's retiring until 21 June (D + 6), when she could resume the unloading task.

Ultimately, the task aided immeasurably by the embarked two platoons of the Army's 311th Port Company, Almaack completed working her cargo by the 24th, unloading the ship in 79 hours. She then sailed to Eniwetok, and thence to Honolulu, independently, arriving there on 5 July 1944. Taking on board combat equipment of the Army's 77th Division (designated as the reserve for the assault on Guam) the attack cargo ship cleared Honolulu on 9 July for Eniwetok, arriving there on the 17th. There becoming a unit of TG 53.19, Almaack sailed for Guam, arriving on the morning of 22 July, W +1 day. She landed neither troops nor cargo the first day, retiring to seaward early that evening.

== Supporting the invasion of Guam ==
For six days, from W + 2 to W + 8, Almaack supported the invasion of Guam; the first three days she retired at night after conducting unloading operations during the day, returning the following morning to the transport area to resume working her cargo. On the 14th, the attack cargo ship fueled the fast minesweeper USS Zane (DMS-14). The wind blew the two ships toward the fire support area where shells from the nearby battleship USS Pennsylvania (BB-38) whistled overhead. Finally, after anchoring in a berth off the invasion beaches of W + 5 (27 July), Almaack commenced working her cargo again, aided immeasurably by two tank landing ships and a tank landing craft assigned to her for that purpose, LST-731, LCT-962 and LST-986. After debarking 16 Army officers and 306 soldiers on 29 July, Almaack sailed for Eniwetok in company with the attack transport USS Monrovia (APA-31). She proceeded thence to Pearl Harbor, arriving there on 23 August. The next day, she entered drydock to have her hull sand-blasted and painted.

Following that repair period at Pearl, Almaack loaded troops, equipment, and supplies of the Army's 96th Infantry Division, slated to take part in the planned invasion of the island of Yap, in the Carolines. After expeditiously completing the cargo loading and embarkation, the attack cargo ship sailed on 1 September for Maui, and from 2 to 6 September conducted exercises there until returning to Pearl Harbor on the 7th to complete preparations for her next operation. On 15 September, Almaack departed Hawaiian waters for the staging point, Eniwetok. One day out, however, the ship received a message indicating the planned invasion of Yap had been cancelled; a later message gave the ultimate destination as the island of Leyte, in the Philippines.

== Preparations for the invasion of the Philippines ==
Reaching Eniwetok on 25 September for replenishment, Almaack took on fuel and supplies there and pushed on for Manus, in the Admiralties, reaching that place—the staging area for the assault on Leyte—on 3 October. Now assigned to the 7th Fleet for the Leyte operation, Almaack remained at Seeadler Harbor, Manus, from 3 to 13 October, provisioning, fueling, and exercising troops. On the latter date, the ship transferred three wave guide officers, 21 men and six LCVPs to various tank landing ships for the operation, receiving in their place six boat officers, 36 men and six LCSs, for transportation to Leyte.

Almaack entered Surigao Strait, en route to Leyte Gulf, early on the morning of 20 October 1944, going to general quarters soon thereafter, anchoring in transport area number two, five miles (8.0 km) east of San Jose, Leyte, at 0841, having hoisted out her embarked landing craft.

Soon after she anchored, Almaack—assigned the task of unloading 13 light tanks in the seventh wave of Orange Beach 2—commenced working her priority cargo, sending her first wave toward the line of departure at 0940 and the second, five minutes later, having unloaded her baker's dozen tanks into her own LCMs, augmented by six from four other amphibious ships. An hour later, the ship commenced unloading cargo. Late that morning, the ship's no. 13 LCVP took a direct hit, damaging it beyond repair and wounding one man. Later that afternoon, Almaack got underway for transport area number three, and went to general quarters within a half-hour of her getting underway; en route she witnessed the torpedoing of the light cruiser USS Honolulu (CL-48).

Over the next two days, frequently blanketed by an almost impenetrable smoke screen to shield the ship from Japanese air attacks, Almaack worked her cargo. On 21 October, Almaack thrice went to general quarters in the course of the day, and fueled two ships, the fast transport USS Sands (APD-13) and the fast minesweeper USS Hamilton (DMS-18), in addition to continuing her unloading cargo. On the day following, A + 2, she again conducted cargo operations, and provided fuel and stores to the landing craft, LCI-472, in addition to disembarking the last of her embarked troops. All boats on board by 1753 on 22 October, Almaack sailed for Hollandia, Dutch New Guinea.

== Commendation for efficient performance at Leyte ==
Her performance at Leyte earned her favorable comments: Rear Admiral Forrest B. Royal, commanding Group 6 of the Pacific Fleet Amphibious Forces, called Almaack's performance of duty "excellent" and her unloading carried out in "an outstanding manner." Commander, 3d Amphibious Force, Vice Admiral Theodore S. Wilkinson, considered Almaack's unloading — an overall average of 72 tons of cargo per hour, and maintaining an average of 105 tons per hour for one nine-hour stretch — as "outstanding and in close accord with estimates made during planning."

Arriving at Hollandia on 27 October, Almaack departed that place on 2 November, being routed to Morotai and arriving there after daylight on the 5th. She commenced loading cargo — 163 vehicles, 169 drums of gasoline, and equipment of the Army's XI Corps Headquarters units and of the Army Air Force's 310th Bombardment Wing. Japanese air raids, executed in nearly clockwork fashion, made the ship's stay at Morotai memorable. Almaack went to general quarters 13 times as a result of enemy aircraft in the vicinity. On one occasion, Almaack contributed eight rounds of 5-inch and four of 3-inch to a barrage. During her stay at Morotai, she also fueled six destroyers.

== Under attack by Japanese fighter bombers ==
The attack cargo ship sailed on her second trip to Leyte on 10 November, and proceeded in company with two transport divisions, the 8th and 24th. One day out of their destination, the transports were attacked by Japanese torpedo planes ("Jills"), one of which closed to visual range of Almaack.

This "Jill" launched her torpedo at USS Catskill (LSV-1), the last ship in the left flank column and directly astern of Almaack. The latter's 3-inch and 5-inch batteries took the Japanese plane under fire at 2,500 yards (2,300 m); her 20-millimeter guns opened up at 800. Almaack's automatic weapons scored hits on the right wing and tail of the "Jill"; shedding parts, the enemy aircraft went out of control about 100 yards (100 m) from Catskill, passed slightly astern of her, and then plunged into the sea, leaving no survivors. In the meantime, Catskill maneuvered and evaded the torpedo. Almaack suffered three men very slightly wounded during the brief engagement, nicked by fragments of "friendly" 20-millimeter projectiles which hit a ship's guy wire.

Entering Surigao Strait at 0036 on 14 November, Almaack went to general quarters at 0600 and entered the transport area a little under an hour later, sending her seven LCMs to assist the other ships in the group to complete their unloading by nightfall. Four LCTs and one LSM carried Almaack's cargo, and in return the attack cargo ship provided provisions, clothing and small stores to these and an LCT that had been unsuccessful in securing provisions from the ships for which she had worked. Having completed her unloading by 0900 on the following day, Almaack returned to Hollandia, arriving on the 19th.

Underway again on the 26th, the attack cargo ship sailed for the Solomons, and reached Empress Augusta Bay on 30 November, commencing loading cargo—vehicles, ammunition, petroleum products, engineering supplies and signal equipment—immediately. She completed the task by 4 December.

Almaack, assigned to TG 79.1 and carrying elements and equipment of the Army's 37th Infantry Division, cleared Empress Augusta Bay for Lae, New Guinea, where the ship participated in landing exercises. Back at Manus, in the Admiralties, on 21 December, Almaack spent Christmas there. Then, on the last day of 1944, the attack cargo ship stood out of Seeadler Harbor for her third trip to the Philippines; this time, "Mack" was bound for Lingayen Gulf.

== Under continued air attack ==
On S-3 day (6 January 1945), the convoy to which Almaack was attached, steaming through the Mindanao Sea, encountered its first enemy aircraft, a Japanese reconnaissance plane which was being hotly pursued by four F4U Corsairs. The "Corsairs" splashed the enemy about 2,500 yards (2,300 m) off Almaack's port beam. Almaack had a close call as the convoy neared its objective on S-1 day (8 January), when two "Betties" (Mitsubishi G4M Type 1 land attack plane) made a glide-bombing run on the ship, straddling her with three bombs released at 5,000 feet (1,500 m). The enemy ordnance missed by 50 yards (50 m), and inflicted no damage.

The air action intensified as Almaack stood up the coast of Luzon; at 1818, she saw combat air patrol (CAP) planes knock down four "Vals" (Aichi D3A Type 99 carrier dive bombers). Later that afternoon, after the ship had gone to general quarters for the second time that day, Almaack witnessed a Japanese suicide plane making a dive on an escort carrier (CVE) eight miles (13 km) off the cargo ship's port bow. The ship under attack was USS Kitkun Bay (CVE-71), which was crashed by an "Oscar" (Nakajima Ki-43 fighter) at 1857.

Minutes later, another suicide plane appeared; Almaack opened fire with all port guns as the enemy plane—identified as either a "Judy" (Yokosuka D4Y carrier attack plane) or "Val"—seemed bent on crashing the next ship astern in the formation. Gunfire from the ships, however, splashed the kamikaze 1,500 yards (1,400 m) off the port bow.

On S-day, 9 January 1945, Almaack went to general quarters twice during the 0400-0800 watch before executing her deployment for the approach disposition and hoisting her boats to the rail. Lowering her landing craft within a half-hour, Almaack anchored in transport area "C", Lingayen Gulf, and at 0745 sighted three Japanese planes in the vicinity, one of which crashed the nearby light cruiser USS Columbia (CL-56). Before the day was over, Almaack's men would see two more victims of the relentless Japanese aerial attacks, the battleship USS Mississippi (BB-41) and the Australian heavy cruiser HMAS Australia (D84), both crashed by Japanese suiciders.

In the meantime, Almaack commenced working her cargo at 0825 after she had opened her hatches and sent boats allocated to other ships for the assault phase. She commenced her initial unloading of equipment from the Army's 148th Regimental Combat Team (RCT) at 0825, shortly after her beach party shoved off to take up its position ashore. Shifting to transport area "M" two hours later to continue to work cargo, LCT-1070 came alongside to assist the ship in the cargo-handling evolution. She continued working cargo for the remainder of the day, going to general quarters twice more before the day was out.

Early the following day, Almaack took USS Barton (DD-722) alongside at 0210 and commenced fueling her at 0225, before she logged in evidence of further Japanese activity to attempt to disrupt the landings: LST-925 reported being attacked by an enemy torpedo boat; USS Robinson (DD-562) was attacked by the same type of craft, and the transport USS Warhawk (AP-168) suffered damage from a Japanese suicide motor boat. Soon after these occurrences, at 0457, Almaack extinguished lights in her cargo holds and ceased cargo operations and boat movements. Barton cast off at 0640, a half-hour after she completed fueling.

For the remainder of S+1, Almaack worked her cargo, unloading it to a barge and LCT-719, before she took on board her boats at 1635 preparatory to retiring from the area, getting underway for an anchorage off San Fabian. Her orders were changed, however, and she put back into Transport Area "M", where she had been before. Later, she resumed cargo operations in her number one hold, while a picket boat watch, as well as armed deck sentries, kept a lookout for potential Japanese suicide swimmers.

The following day, Almaack continued unloading cargo, and, when the occasion demanded, supplied fresh water and provisions to LCI—1020, supplies and water to LCI-451, her stream anchor to LSM-137 to replace the one the landing ship had lost; provided gasoline and stores to LC1-567. She transferred cargo to LSM-31 during the course of the afternoon. The next day, S + 3, Almaack provided fresh water to the motor minesweeper YMS-319; water and supplies to LCI-975, and LCI-373; water to LC1-751; gas and fog oil to LC 1–567; stores and gas to LCI-462.

Having completed unloading the last of her six holds at 1441 on S + 3 day, Almaack hoisted on board her boats and stood out of Lingayen Gulf at 1710, her part in the invasion completed. The first morning out, the convoy was attacked by suicide planes; one crashed the lead ship, the attack transport USS Zeilin (APA-3).

From 15 to 19 January 1945, Almaack lay anchored in Leyte Gulf, before she pushed on for the Western Carolines, reaching Ulithi on 23 January. She remained there until 6 February, when she sailed for Guam to load elements of the 3d Marine Division, in preparation for what would prove to be the last amphibious operation for Almaack in the war—the assault on Iwo Jima.

== Supporting the invasion of Iwo Jima ==
Arriving at Guam on 8 February, Almaack commenced loading troops and cargo of the 3d Engineer Battalion, 3d Pioneer Battalion, and a replacement company, as well as vehicles, ammunition, petroleum products, rations, and water that same afternoon, bringing the operation to a completion on the following morning. She sailed for Iwo Jima on the morning of 17 February.

Almaack arrived in the maneuvering area 125 miles (201 km) southeast of Iwo Jima at 2200, 19 February, and, in company with the other ships in the task group, awaited orders. Sent in to the transport areas, the ship arrived off Iwo on 22 February, but did not unload any cargo that day or the next. Each evening during those days, the ship would retire to seaward. Due to the congested beaches, Almaack's loading was delayed until the 24th; that morning the ship put all of her boats in the water to dispatched to attack transports to disembark assault troops.

Almaack unloaded her cargo "on call" as the situation ashore demanded it, from 24 February 1945 to 3 March. On 1 March, the ship took on board shell cases from cruisers and destroyers. She put her last priority cargo item, one vehicle, on board LSM-238 late on the 3d. The attack cargo ship remained in the transport area during the night of 3 March, and retired the following night, arriving back in the transport area on the morning of the 5th. She unloaded all of the remaining vehicles and "B" rations and took on board more shell cases from cruisers and destroyers on the 6th before departing that same day (6 March) for Guam.

Almaack reached Garapan anchorage, Saipan, on the morning of 9 March, and there debarked casualties brought from Iwo; she pushed on for Apra Harbor, Guam, on the late afternoon of the following day, and reached her destination on the morning of 11 March to unload marine supplies not required at Iwo Jima. Sailing thence the following morning for the Solomons, Almaack reached Tulagi on the afternoon of the 18th, where she picked up new landing boats. Proceeding thence to Nouméa, the attack cargo ship arrived there on the 23d for liberty, repairs, and to embark elements of the Army's 81st Infantry Division.

Shifted from a combat load to a regular cargo load, Almaack sailed for the Admiralties on the morning of 3 May, and thence to the Philippines, reaching Leyte on the 16th. There the 81st Infantry Division units went ashore, and after ten days in the Philippines, Almaack sailed for Pearl Harbor on the morning of 26 May. Stopping at Pearl only briefly, the attack cargo ship sailed for San Francisco on the afternoon of 7 June, arriving on the 13th.

== End-of-war operations ==
Following repairs and alterations at the AmShip Co., of Alameda, California, Almaack took on supplies at the naval supply depot, completing loading on 21 August—one week after Japan accepted the terms of the Potsdam Declaration and agreed to surrender. Receiving word cancelling all blackout restrictions on 6 September while en route to the Philippines, Almaack reached Samar on 10 September. After discharging a small portion of her cargo there, she sailed to Subic Bay, arriving on the 26th. From the Philippines she sailed thence to Japan, reaching Nagoya on 28 October to embark men of the Army's 11th Replacement Depot, and sailed for Portland, Oregon, on 14 November.

== Return to Stateside ==
Discharging her passengers there on the 24th, Almaack shifted down the coast to Albany, California, where she loaded a cargo of petroleum products; she sailed for China on 18 December 1945, and arrived at the North Chinese port of Tientsin on 21 January 1946. She sailed from there on 30 January with Army and Navy passengers embarked, ultimately arriving at Seattle.

== Post-war decommissioning ==
Ordered to New York to report to the Commandant, 3d Naval District, for disposition, Almaack reported on 10 May 1946, and was decommissioned at Brooklyn on 23 May 1946. Regarded as not essential to the defense of the United States, Almaack was struck from the Naval Vessel Register on 15 August 1946, removed from naval custody on 12 September 1946, and transferred to the War Shipping Administration.

== Honors and awards ==
- Combat Action Ribbon
- China Service Medal
- American Defense Service Medal with "A" device
- American Campaign Medal
- European–African–Middle Eastern Campaign Medal with one battle star for World War II service
- Asiatic-Pacific Campaign Medal with five battle stars for World War II service
- World War II Victory Medal
- Navy Occupation Service Medal with "ASIA" clasp
- Philippine Republic Presidential Unit Citation (Republic of the Philippines)
- Philippine Liberation Medal with two stars for World War II service (Republic of the Philippines)
