= Adolf Piening =

German naval officer

- Born: 16 September 1910; Süderende on Föhr, German Empire
- Died: 15 May 1984 (aged 73); Kiel, West Germany
- Military career
- Allegiance: Nazi Germany (to 1945); West Germany
- Branch: Kriegsmarine; German Navy
- Service years: 1930–45; 1956–69
- Rank: Kapitänleutnant (Kriegsmarine); Kapitän zur See
- Commands: U-155
- Conflicts: World War II: Battle of the Atlantic
- Awards: Knight's Cross of the Iron Cross

Adolf Cornelius Piening (16 September 1910 – 15 May 1984) was a German naval officer. During World War II, he served in the Kriegsmarine and commanded the Type IXC U-boat U-155, sinking twenty-six ships on nine patrols, for a total of 140,449 gross register tons (GRT) of Allied shipping. Piening was a recipient of the Knight's Cross of the Iron Cross.

Piening spent two years as a prisoner of war and was released in 1947. He joined the new German Navy (the Bundesmarine), which was established in 1956, serving until becoming team leader at the Bundeswehr Command and Staff College. He retired in 1969 with the rank of Captain at sea.

== Career ==
Piening joined the Reichsmarine in 1930; the service was renamed as Kriegsmarine in 1935. His first assignment was to the armoured cruiser Deutschland, after which he served on torpedo boats and minesweepers, reaching the rank of Kapitänleutnant by April 1939. In October 1940 he moved from the surface fleet to the U-boat arm (U-Bootwaffe).

In May–June 1941 he carried out a single patrol out of Saint-Nazaire aboard U-48 (commanded by Herbert Schultze) as Kommandantenschüler or "Commander-in-Training". Following this, he was appointed commander of the newly built Type IX submarine U-155 on 23 August 1941. After training the boat's crew for several months, Piening set out from Kiel on his first patrol in command of U-155 in February 1942, with the intention of attacking shipping in American waters. On the journey across the Atlantic, U-155 encountered the westbound convoy ON 67, and after sending out a contact report that allowed several more U-boats to be directed against the convoy, carried out an attack that sank an 8,000 ton tanker and a 1,800 ton freighter. U-155 sank another ship off the coast of the United States re-crossing the Atlantic to the submarine's new base at Lorient, as part of the 10th U-boat Flotilla.

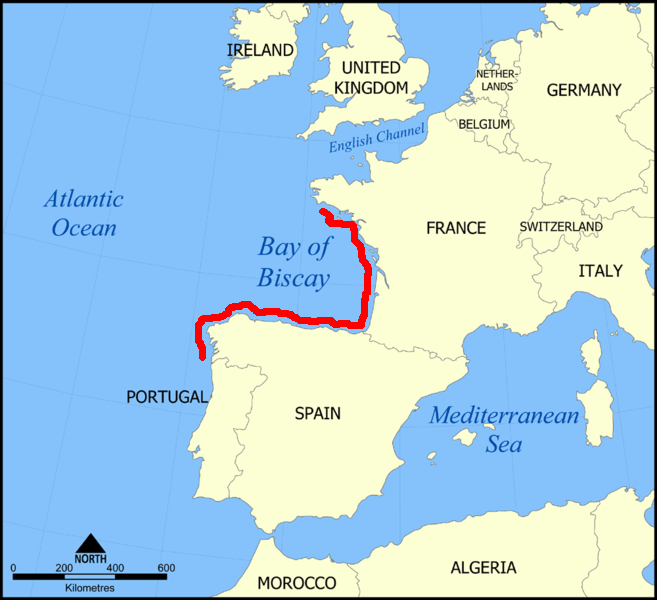
The "Piening Route" in red.

Piening carried out a further seven patrols in command of U-155, sinking 26 ships for a total of 140,449 gross register tons (GRT), including the escort carrier HMS Avenger, and also badly damaged the attack cargo ship USS Almaack. He also became well known for developing the "Piening Route" in 1943, hugging the coast of France and northern Spain, to evade Allied patrol aircraft in the Bay of Biscay. U-155 attacked and sank MS Siranger, sailing from New York to West-Africa, on 24 October 1943. There were no deaths, and all on board reached the lifeboats. The U-155 later surfaced and Piening apologized to the survivors for the act, claiming he was only carrying out orders. Dokumentary by NRK

In March 1944 Piening left U-155 and was appointed commander of the 7th U-boat Flotilla at Saint-Nazaire. In April 1945 Piening made one last patrol, laying mines off Saint-Nazaire in U-255. At the end of the war, he was taken prisoner of war.

== Postwar ==
Piening was released after two years of Allied imprisonment in 1947.

In 1956, West Germany established its navy, the Bundesmarine, and Piening joined the new navy. In 1959 he was appointed commanding officer of the 1. Geleitgeschwader (1st Escort Squadron). He then held the position of Planning officer on the staff of COMNAVNORCENT (Commander Allied Naval Forces North Norway) and Chief of the Operations Division on the staff of COMNAVBALTAP (Commander of Allied Forces Baltic Approaches). On 1 October 1965 he became team leader at the Führungsakademie der Bundeswehr, serving until 1969, retiring with the rank of Kapitän zur See. He died in Kiel on 15 May 1984.

== Awards ==
- Wehrmacht Long Service Award 4th Class (2 October 1936)
- Spanish Cross in Bronze with Swords (6 June 1939)
- Iron Cross (1939)
  - 2nd Class (22 November 1939)
  - 1st Class (27 June 1940)
- U-boat War Badge (1939) (28 March 1942)
- Knight's Cross of the Iron Cross on 13 August 1942 as Kapitänleutnant and commander of U-155.

Military offices
Preceded by Kapitänleutnant Herbert Sohler	Commander of 7th U-boat Flotilla; March 1944 – May 1945	Succeeded by disbanded
